= Alleyn =

Alleyn is a surname (and occasionally a first name). Notable people with the surname include:

- Charles Joseph Alleyn (1817–1890), Quebec lawyer and political figure
- Edward Alleyn (1566–1626), English actor
- James Allen (educator) (1683–1746), or Alleyn, master of the College of God's Gift in Dulwich
- Sir James Alleyn (judge) (died c. 1457), Irish judge
- Sir John Alleyne, 1st Baronet (1724–1801), Speaker of the House of Assembly of Barbados
- Sir John Alleyne, 3rd Baronet (1820–1912), British businessman and engineer
- John Alleyn (surgeon) (died 1686), surgeon and fifth Master of the College of God's Gift in Dulwich
- John Alleyn (MP) (1621–1663), British barrister and MP for Mitchell (Michael)
- John Alleyn (mercer) (died 1544), Lord Mayor of London
- Matthias Alleyn (died 1642), second Master of the College of God's Gift in Dulwich
- Raph Alleyn (died c. 1677), fourth Master of the College of God's Gift in Dulwich
- Roderick Alleyn, a fictional police detective
- Thomas Alleyn (3rd Master of Dulwich College) (died c. 1668), third Master of the College of God's Gift in Dulwich
- Thomas Alleyn (Barber-Surgeon) (died 1631), first Master of the College of God's Gift in Dulwich

== See also ==
- Allen
- Alleyn's School
