= Thomas Alleyn =

Thomas Alleyn may refer to:

- Thomas Alleyn (MP), in 1393 MP for East Grinstead (UK Parliament constituency)
- Thomas Alleyn (3rd Master of Dulwich College) (died 1668/1669)
- Thomas Alleyn (Barber-Surgeon) (died 1631)

== See also ==
- Alleyn
- Thomas Allen (disambiguation)
- Thomas Alleyne (died 1558), English priest
