= Joseph Allen (doctor of medicine) =

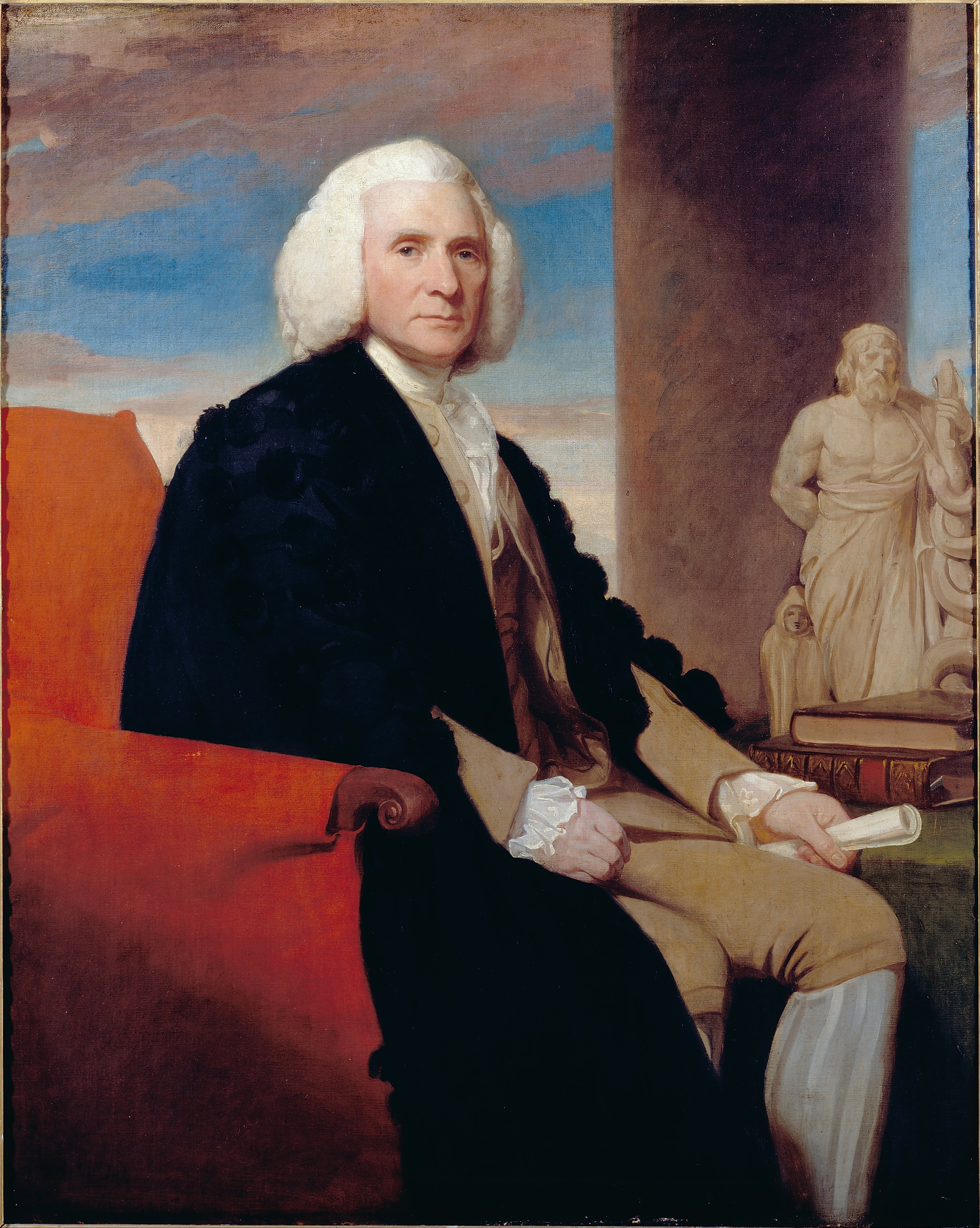
George Romney's painting of Joseph Allen

Joseph Allen M.D. (ca. 1714 – 10 January 1796) was an eighteenth century physician, surgeon on Lord Anson's circumnavigation of the world, and Master of the College of God's Gift in Dulwich.

== Lord Anson's circumnavigation ==
Joseph Allen was born in Ireland in around 1714. He was bred a surgeon and in this capacity accompanied Commodore George Anson on his celebrated circumnavigation of the globe from 1740 to 1743.

== Dulwich College ==
On his return from his voyage with Lord Anson, Joseph was elected as Warden of the College of God's Gift in Dulwich on 25 February 1744. He was not in the post for much beyond two years before the master of the college, James Allen died on 28 October 1746. Joseph, by virtue of his position as Warden, immediately became master.

During his time as Master Joseph continued to pursue a medical career and obtained the degree of doctor of medicine from the University of St. Andrew's on 23 April 1754. He was admitted a Licentiate of the College of Physicians on 30 September 1765.

In his capacity as master of the college, he did little to further Edward Alleyn's (the founder) directions to provide every poor scholar with adequate preparation for the world.

He vacated the office of Master on 21 June 1775 in order to marry a widow, Elizabeth Plaw (marriage at that time being prohibited for the master of the college, in adherence with Alleyn's statutes).

== Later life ==
On his retirement, his portrait was painted by George Romney, and this is still in the possession of Dulwich College. After his wife's death in 1781 he lived a further 15 years, dying on 10 January 1796 following a few days' illness. He was 82 and was long believed to be the last known survivor of those who had accompanied Lord Anson. In his will he left £500 to the Asylum, £500 to the Lying-In Hospital and £200 to the Parish of Camberwell to provide coals for the poor in the Hamlet of Dulwich.

Academic offices
Preceded by James Allen	Master of the College of God's Gift; 1746–1775	Succeeded by Thomas Allen
