= Wilfred Baugh Allen =

Welsh judge (1849–1922)

Wilfred Baugh Allen JP (14 Nov. 1849 - 10 June 1922) was a Welsh judge.

He was the son of George Baugh Allen of Cilrhiw, Pembrokeshire and his wife Dorothea Hannah (née Eaton). His paternal grandfather was Lancelot Baugh Allen. He was educated at Rugby and Trinity College, Cambridge. He was admitted at the Inner Temple in 1880 and was called to the bar in 1882. He served as a member of the South Eastern Circuit. In early 1903 he was appointed a Judge of County Courts on Circuit No. 18.

He was Justice of the Peace for both Pembrokeshire and Nottinghamshire.

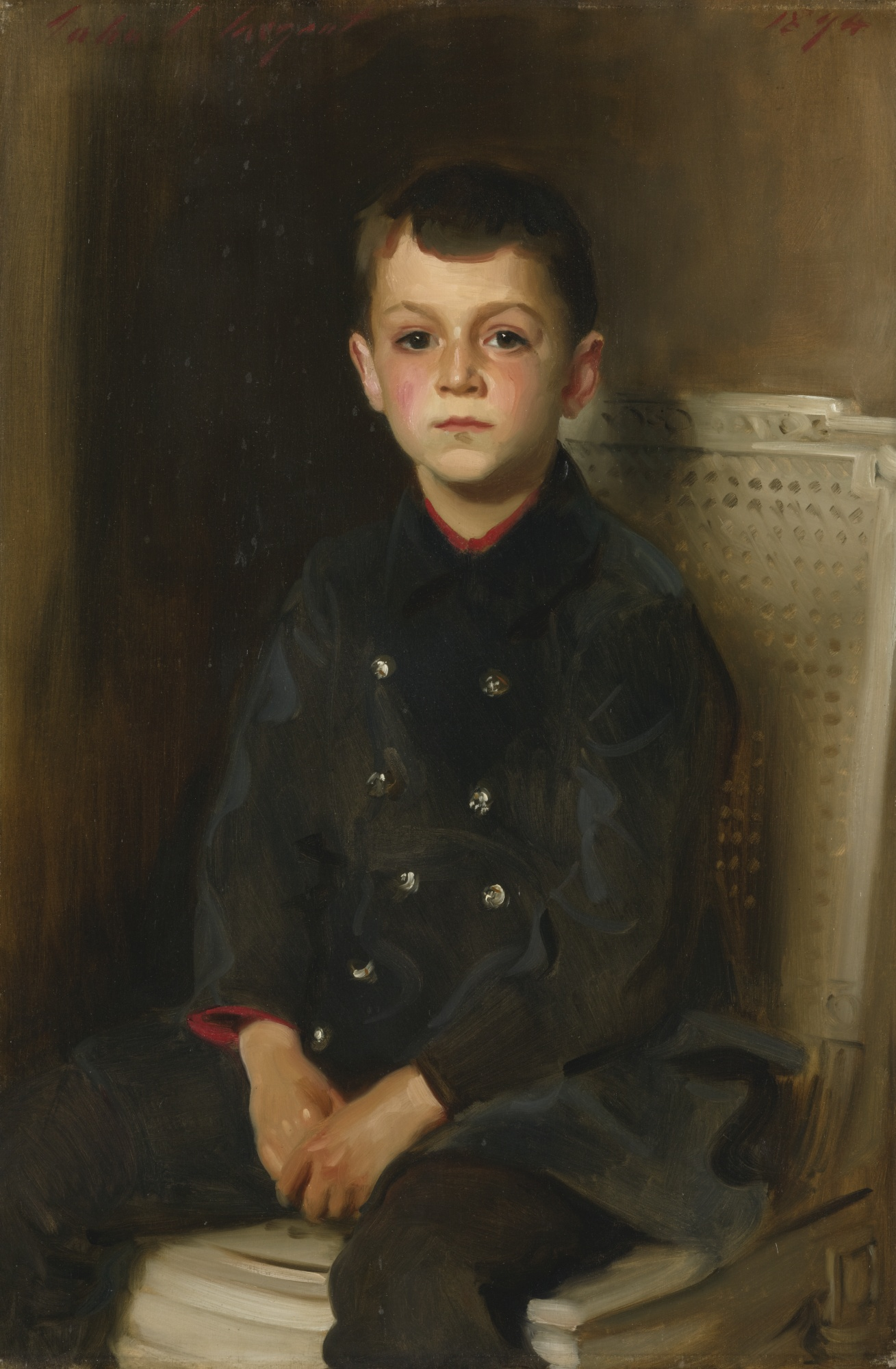
Portrait of Lancelot Allen, John Singer Sargent, 1894

In 1883 he married Anne Sophia Wedgwood, daughter of late Rev. Robert Wedgwood of Dumbleton, Gloucestershire, and granddaughter of John Wedgwood. The Wedgwood and Allen families having been linked for some time, his great-aunt Elizabeth Allen having married Josiah Wedgwood II. They had one son, Richard Lancelot Baugh Allen, who died in Egypt in 1918 on active service during the First World War with the 67th Bgde Royal Field Artillery.
