= James Allen (educator) =

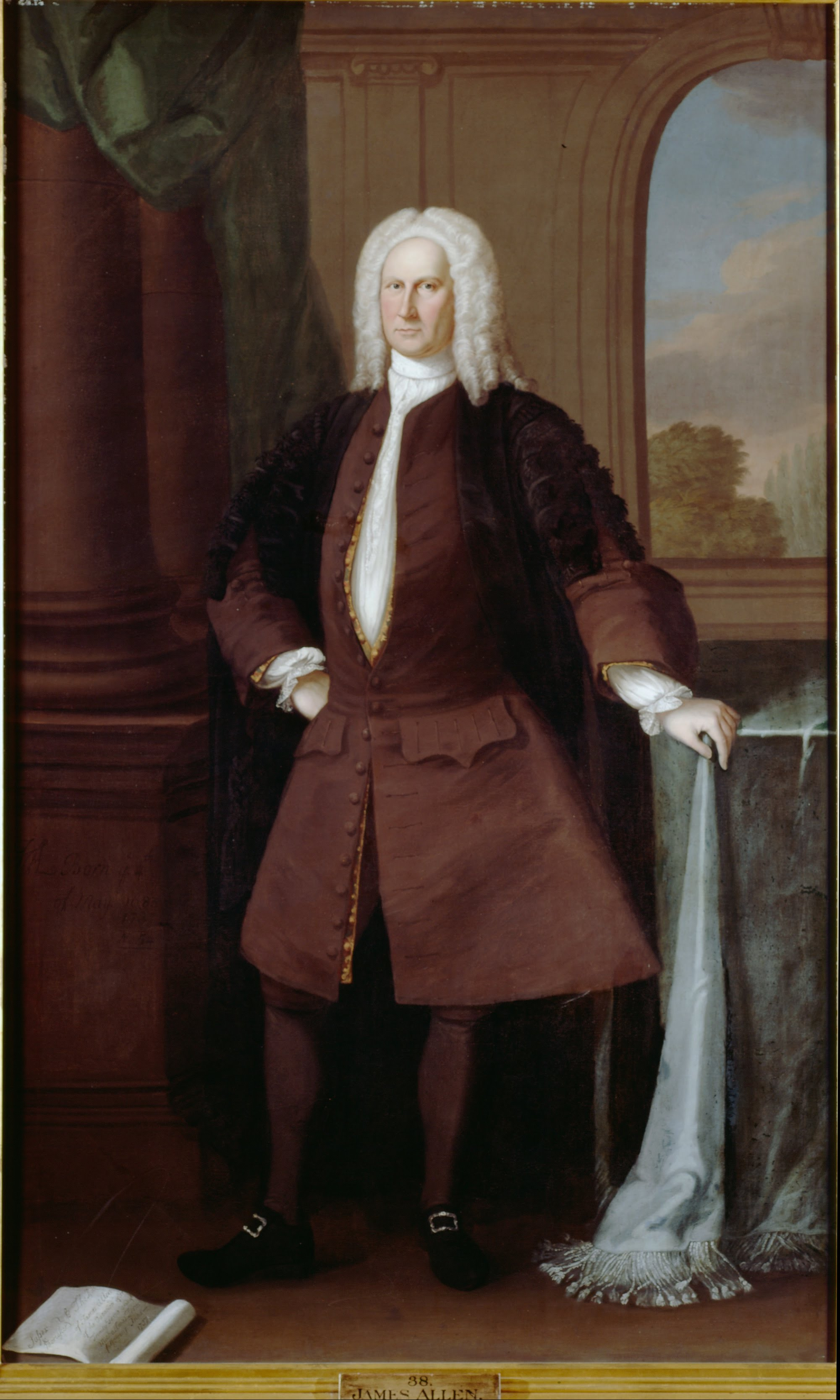
James Allen, 1737

James Allen (4 May 1683 – 28 October 1746) was a prominent 18th-century educationalist, Master of the College of God's Gift in Dulwich (then colloquially called "Dulwich College") and was the founder of James Allen's Girls' School.

== Early life ==
Born on 4 May 1683 in Hornsey, North London, he later moved to Sussex. His father, also James Allen, drowned in an accident in 1690, after which his mother, Elizabeth, moved the family to Westminster and remarried. By 1701, James Allen was a clerk in the Cursitors' Hall, the clerical branch of the Court of Chancery.

== Job and career ==
James Allen took the role of Warden of the college on 26 May 1712 under the name James Alleyn and became Master on 1 September 1721. During his time at the college much rebuilding was carried out and the estates run by the charitable foundation were carefully administered. Most of his predecessors, both in the role of Master and Warden, as well as most of the former Fellows of the college, had taken advantage of the privileged position they found themselves in to live the pleasantest life possible, whilst for the most part ignoring the wishes of the college's founder, Edward Alleyn, to ensure that every poor scholar would be adequately prepared for going out in the world, be that into an apprenticeship or to university.

James Allen, however, was very conscious of the Foundation's duty as laid out in the statutes penned by Edward Alleyn. In order to provide education for the boys of Dulwich, in 1741 he made over to the college six houses near the gravel pits of Kensington that he had bought in 1737, the rents from which were to be used to establish two small schools in Dulwich, to be known as the Dulwich Free School, first set up in a local tavern. One where boys would be taught to read, and the other was a step further for this was where girls would be taught to read and sew. This was the seed that would eventually grow into the present day James Allen's Girls' School which dates its foundation back to this date in 1741 (although the James Allen Foundation only ceased to be responsible for boys after the boys were moved to "Dulwich College Grammar School" in 1842). The last of the house was still owned by the school up until 1997 when it was sold to establish the fund which finances James Allen's Girls' School Assisted Places.

Also of note was that James Allen was the first Master of the college to drop the 'y' from his surname (thus Alleyn became Allen). With one exception, all successive Masters up to the time of Alfred James Carver in 1858 would copy this.

During his tenure of the Mastership of the college there were six Wardens who served with him. The position of Warden automatically became the Master on the death, resignation or removal of the current Master. However, four Wardens were elected and pre-deceased James (William Alleyn died 1723; John Alleyn died 1731; William Allen died 1735; Henry Allen died 1744–45), one resigned (Thomas Allen resigned in 1740), and only the sixth, Joseph Allen, outlasted James.

His portrait hangs in the college under which he is described as "six feet high, skilful as a skater, a jumper, athletic and humane."

He died on 28 October 1746 and was buried in the College Chapel.

== Family ==
His daughter, Elizabeth, went on to marry Alexander, 4th Baron Forbes of Pitsligo, of Pitsligo Castle in Aberdeenshire, Scotland. She was his second wife. Lord Forbes was attainted for rebellion in 1745, and lost his title.

Academic offices
Preceded by Thomas Alleyn	Master of the College of God's Gift; 1721–1746	Succeeded by Joseph Allen
