= George Webster (medical practitioner) =

English physician (died 1876)

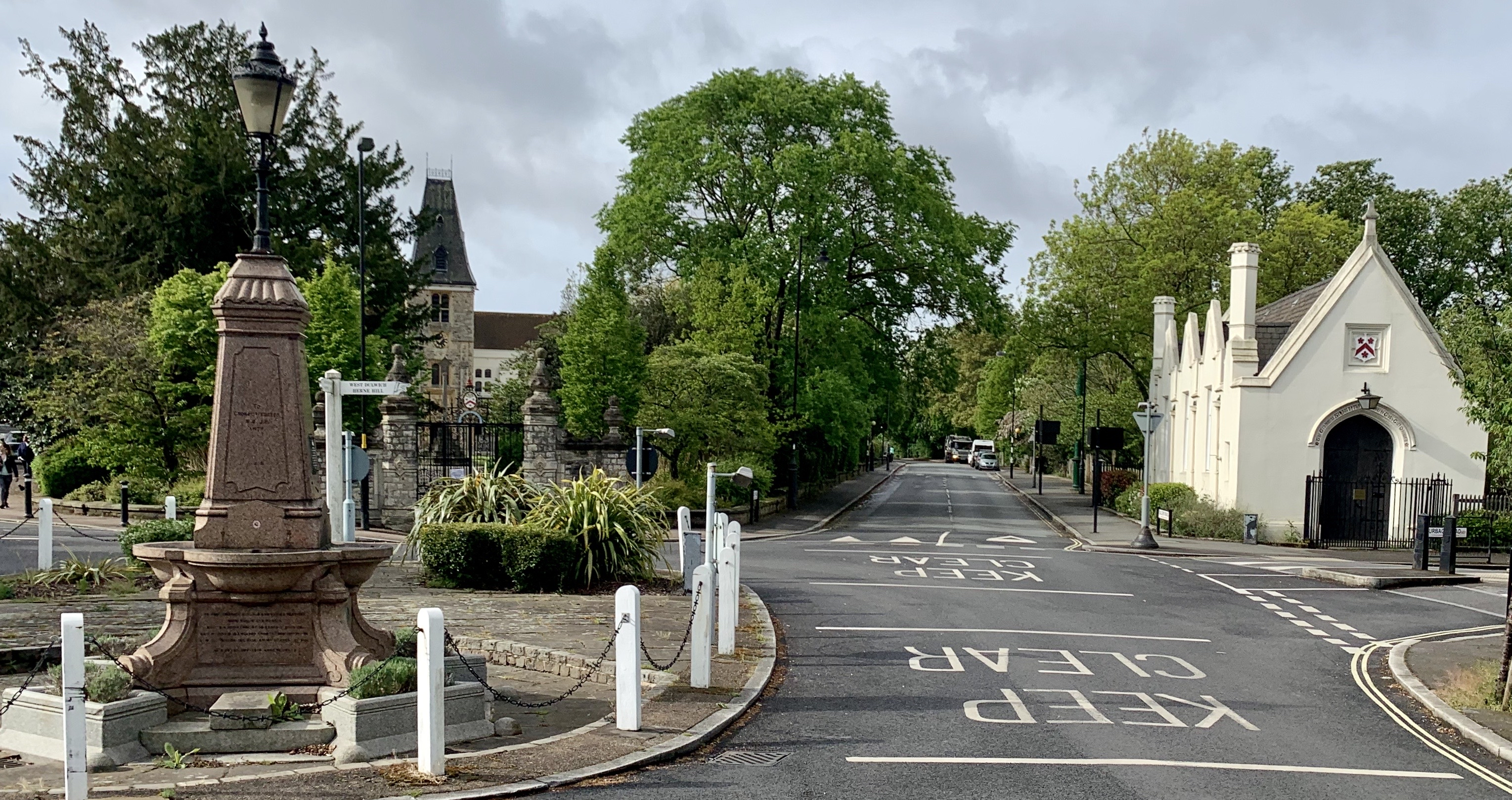
The memorial to George Webster (left), outside the College of God's Gift in Dulwich, erected in 1877.

Dr. George Webster, G.P., J.P. (died 19 November 1876) was a physician active in England, and the founder of the first British Medical Association, sometimes known as "Webster's Medical Association".

The association was founded in 1836, and the first meeting of the association was held on 19 January 1837 at Exeter Hall.

A fountain at the centre of Dulwich was erected in his memory in 1876, where he had lived for 60 years.
