= George Baugh Allen =

Welsh lawyer (1821–1898)

George Baugh Allen JP DL (23 April 1821 – 19 September 1898) was a Welsh lawyer.

== Biography ==
Allen was the elder son of Lancelot Baugh Allen, Master (i.e. headmaster) of Dulwich College, and his first wife Caroline Jane (née Romilly). He was of the Allen family of Creselly, Pembrokeshire. He was educated at Westminster School and Trinity College, Cambridge. His brother Edmund followed an ecclesiastical career.

He was admitted to the Inner Temple in 1842, but was not called to the bar, instead working as a special pleader for fifty years. He was described in Alumni Cantabrigienses as "the last of the great special pleaders". Sydney Holland, 2nd Viscount Knutsford was once his pupil. He was also justice of the peace and deputy lieutenant for Pembrokeshire.

He married 1846 Dorothea Hannah Eaton, daughter of Roger Eaton. They had eight children:

- John Romilly Allen (1847-1907)
- George Allen (1848-?)
- Wilfred Baugh Allen (1849-1922)
- Mary Catherine Romilly Allen (1851-?)
- Annie Emma Allen (1852-1942)
- Dora Blanche Allen (1854-?)
- Joseph Henry Baugh Allen (1856-?)
- Wilmot Baugh Allen (1857-1923)

He died at 5, Albert Terrace, Regent's Park, London
