= Matthias Alleyn =

Matthias Alleyn (died 9 April 1642) was a 17th-century London gentleman and the second Master of the College of God's Gift.

== Early life ==
He was born the cousin of Edward Alleyn in London. His first wife, Elizabeth, died in 1627. With his second wife he had two daughters. His son, John Alleyn would later become Warden and then Master of the same college, and was also the last member of Edward Alleyn's family to hold such posts within the Foundation.

== Career ==
When Edward Alleyn laid out the Deed of Foundation of the College of God's Gift in Dulwich, which was soon colloquially referred to as "Dulwich College", he stipulated that the Master and Warden should always be unmarried and of Alleyn's blood, and surname, and if the former was impossible then at least of Alleyn's surname. Both he and his cousin Thomas, who became the first master, met the criteria of being of Edward Alleyn's blood and surname, although he was married. Edward Alleyn named him in the Deed of Foundation as Warden, thus he was appointed on 13 September 1619. However, such was Edward Alleyn's continued involvement in his charitable concern that neither he nor Thomas assumed office until Edward Alleyn's death in 1626. He was a trustee for Edward Alleyn's widow and the executor of his will.

He became master on 27 March 1631 after the death of Thomas Alleyn. It has been noted that in the period between the founder's death and when the college was reconstituted in 1857, the chief object of the Master, Warden and Fellows had been to lead the pleasantest life possible with little regard to furthering Alleyn's directions to provide every poor scholar with adequate preparation for the world. The fact that the founder had been so narrow in his definition of who could become master or warden also meant that this narrowed the field of applicants such that the quality of candidate was not always of the highest calibre. This led to a "sad procession of non-entities" in the words of one commentator, with few exceptions. Matthias, was not named as an exception.

He died on 9 April 1642 and was succeeded in the post by another cousin of the founder, a second Thomas Alleyn who had served as warden in the period that Matthias had been Master. Matthias gave a silver bowl to the college, which is still held by the college.

Academic offices
Preceded by Thomas Alleyn	Master of the College of God's Gift; 1631–1642	Succeeded by Thomas Alleyn
