= College of God's Gift =

Former charity in London

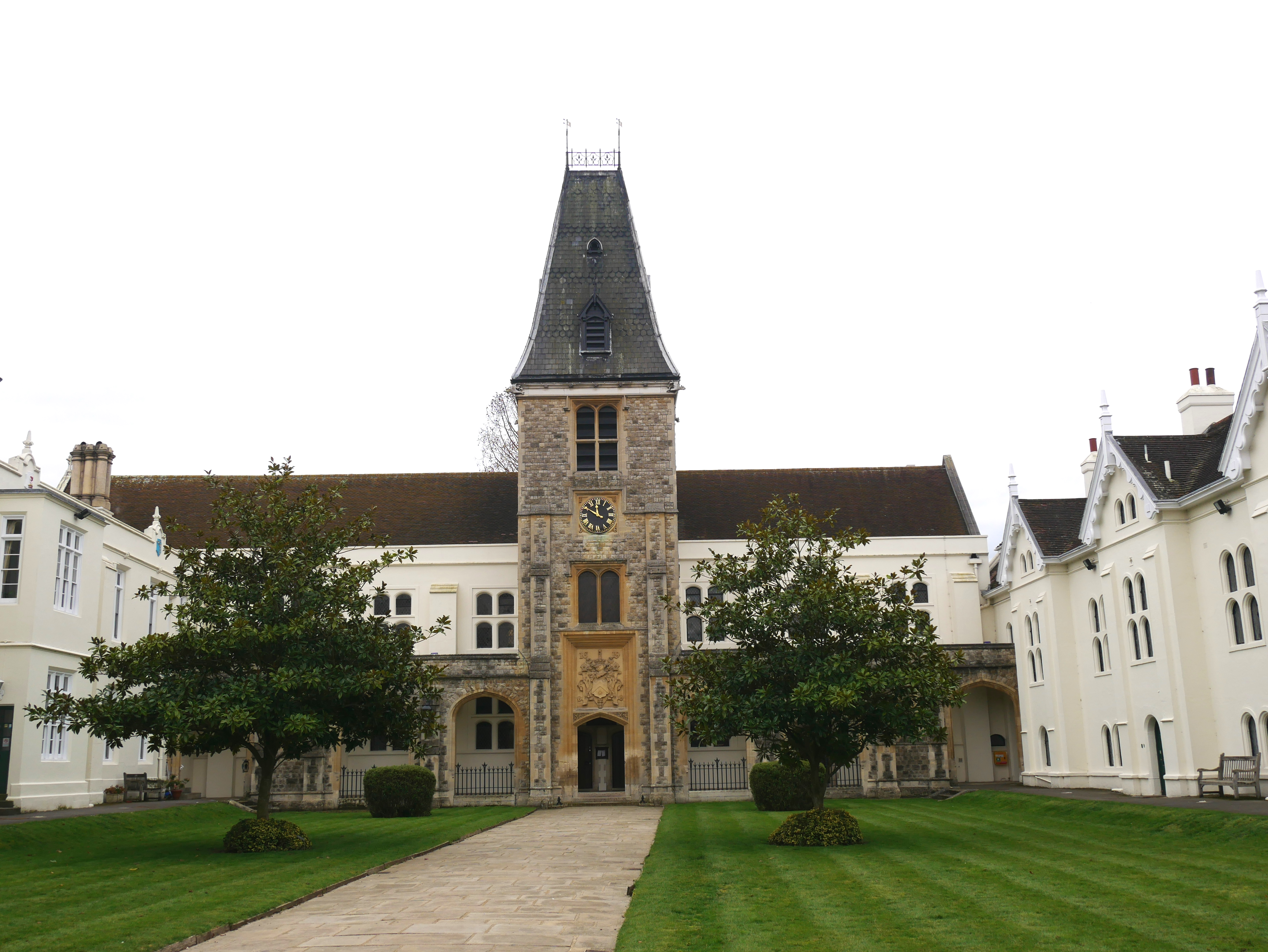
The Old College complex, including Christ's Chapel of God's Gift

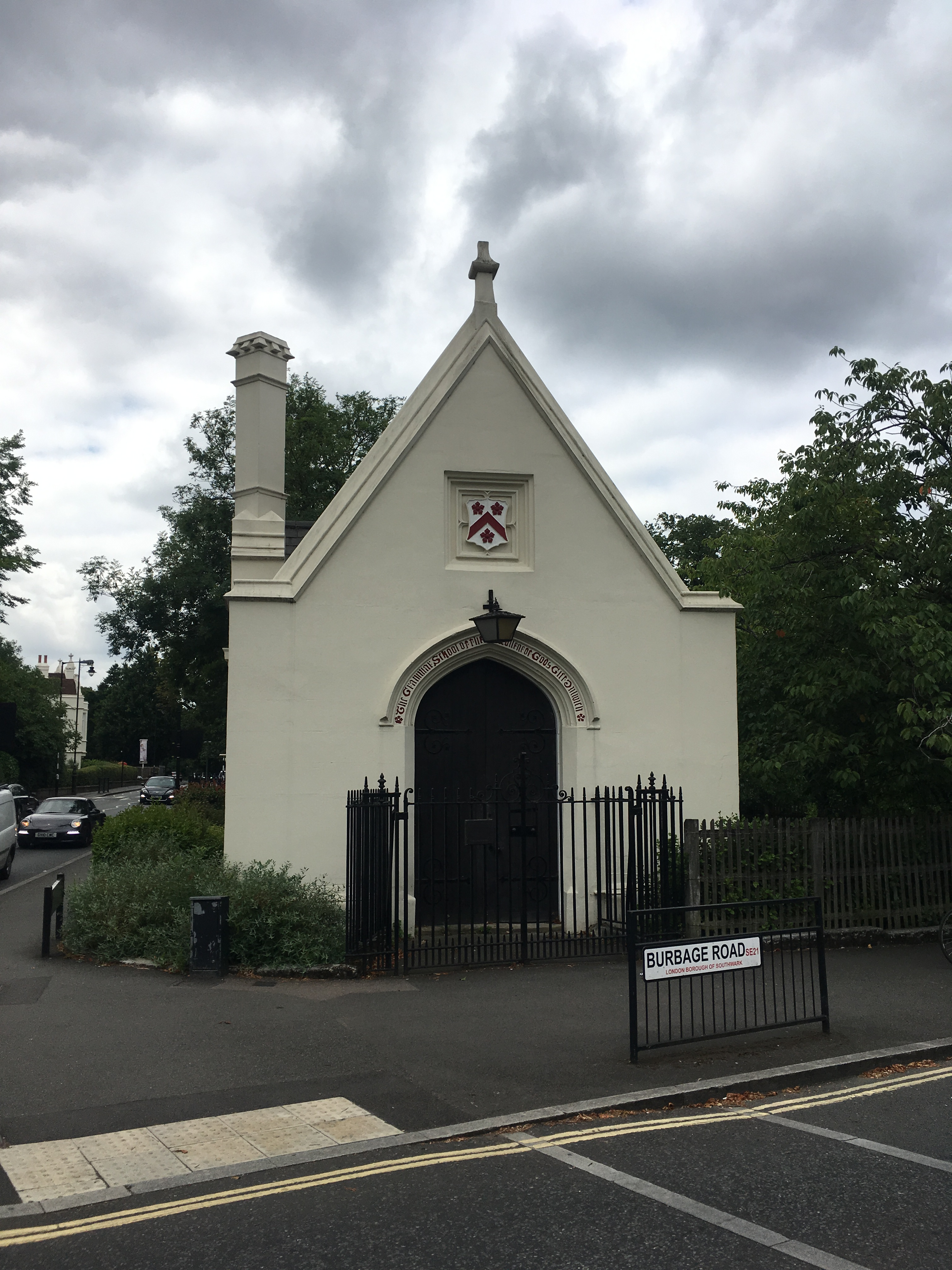
The Old Grammar School; the sign above the door says The Grammar School of the College of God's Gift Dulwich

The College of God's Gift, often referred to as the Old (Dulwich) College, was a historic charity founded in 1619 by the Elizabethan actor and businessman Edward Alleyn who endowed it with the ancient Manor of Dulwich in south London. In 1857 it was renamed as Alleyn's College of God's Gift. The charity was reorganised in 1882 and again in 1995, when its varied component activities were split up into separate registered charities. The former constituent elements of College of God's Gift, which have been independent charities since 1995, are:

- The Dulwich Estate, the successor charity which owns the remaining freehold land of the manor of Dulwich
- Alleyn's School
- Dulwich College
- James Allen's Girls' School
- Dulwich Almshouse located in the Old College complex
- Christ's Chapel of God's Gift located in the Old College complex
- Dulwich Picture Gallery, which became independent and ceased to be a beneficiary in 1995

The Foundation is also required to support from its endowment, as originally required by Alleyn, the Central Foundation Schools of London, which benefits Central Foundation Boys' School and Central Foundation Girls' School, and St Olave's & St Saviour's Schools Foundation, which benefits St Olave's Grammar School and St Saviour's and St Olave's Church of England School which are beneficiaries but wholly independent and indeed older foundations than that at Dulwich.

== History ==
=== 1619: Foundation: The College of God's Gift at Dulwich ===
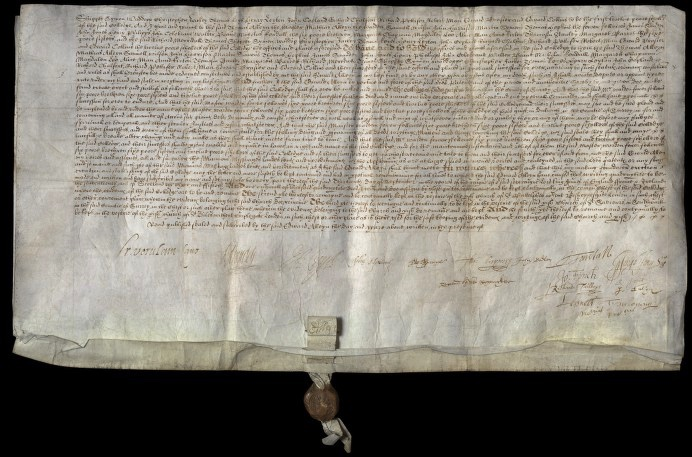
1619 Deed of Foundation of a college to be called and named The College of God's Gift in Dulwich in the County of Surrey, signed in the presence of Francis Bacon, Thomas Howard, Edward Cecil, Sir John Howland, Sir Edmund Bowyer, Sir Thomas Grimes, Sir John Bodley, Sir John Tunstall, Inigo Jones, John Finch, Richard Jones, secretary to the Lord Chancellor, Richard Talboyes, Edmond Howes, Jo Anthony and Lionell Tichbourne

On 21 June 1619 the letters patent were signed by James I authorising Edward Alleyn to establish a “colledge and hospitall” in Dulwich to be called the College of God's Gift, in Dulwich in Surrey. The term Dulwich College was used colloquially from that date, such as in 1675 when John Evelyn described his visit to "Dulwich College" in his Diary. However, for at least 263 years this colloquialism was incorrect as, even when the school that is considered that college’s genesis was founded (see 1842: The Grammar School) it was part of the overall charitable foundation. Edward Alleyn, as well as being a famous Elizabethan actor, was also a man of great property and wealth, derived mainly from places of entertainment including theatres, bear-gardens and brothels.All of these ventures were legitimate at the time and rumours that Alleyn turned his attention towards charitable pursuits out of fear for his moral well-being have been traced to the journalist George Sala and discredited. Since 1605, Alleyn had owned the manorial estate of Dulwich, and it may have been around this time that he first had the idea of establishing a college or hospital for poor people and the education of poor boys.

The building on Dulwich Green of a chapel, a schoolhouse and twelve almshouses, began in 1613 and was completed in the autumn of 1616. On 1 September 1616 the chapel was consecrated by the Archbishop of Canterbury who became the official Visitor. However, Edward Alleyn faced objections from Francis Bacon, the Lord Chancellor, in getting the patent of incorporation that was necessary to secure the foundation's status as a college: He considered “Hospitalls” poor value for money; money that would be lost to the Treasury in death duties upon Alleyn’s demise. It was Alleyn's persistence that led to the foundation being endowed by James I's signing of the letters patent.

The charity originally consisted of a Master, Warden, four fellows, six poor brothers, six poor sisters and twelve poor scholars who became the joint legal owners of Alleyn's endowment of the manor and lands of Dulwich, collectively known as the Members of the college. The poor brothers and sisters and scholars were to be drawn from the four parishes which were most closely tied to Alleyn (being St Botolph's Bishopsgate where he was born, St Giles, Middlesex where he had built his Firtune Theatre, St Saviour's Southwark where he had the Paris Bear Garden, and St Giles Camberwell where the college was founded). The business of the charity was conducted in the name of these thirty members by the Master, Warden and four Fellows (Chaplain, Schoolmaster, Usher and Organist).

Alleyn drew upon the experience of other similar establishments in order to formulate the statutes and ordinances of the college (including borrowing the statutes of the already ancient Winchester College and visiting the more contemporary establishments of Sutton's Hospital (now Charterhouse School) and Croydon's Hospital (now Whitgift School)). Amongst the many statutes and ordinances signed by Alleyn that pertained to the charitable scheme were provisions that the scholars were entitled to stay until they were eighteen. And to be taught in good and sound learning'…'that they might be prepared for university or for good and sweet trades and occupations. Another stipulation was that the Master and Warden should always be unmarried and of Alleyn's blood, and surname, and if the former was impossible then at least of Alleyn's surname. Alleyn also made provision that the people of Dulwich should be able to have their men children instructed at the school for a fee as well as children from outside Dulwich for a separate fee.

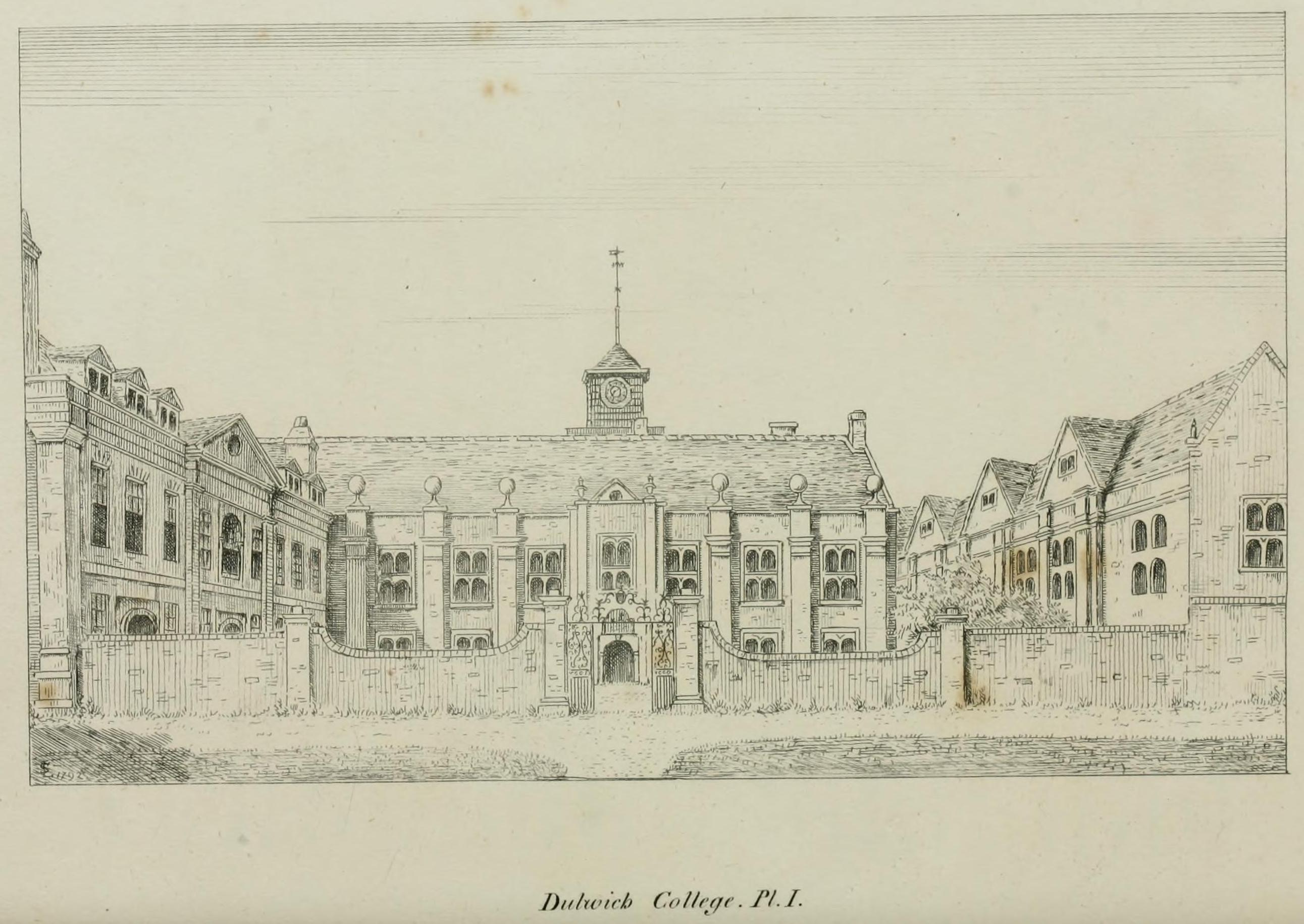
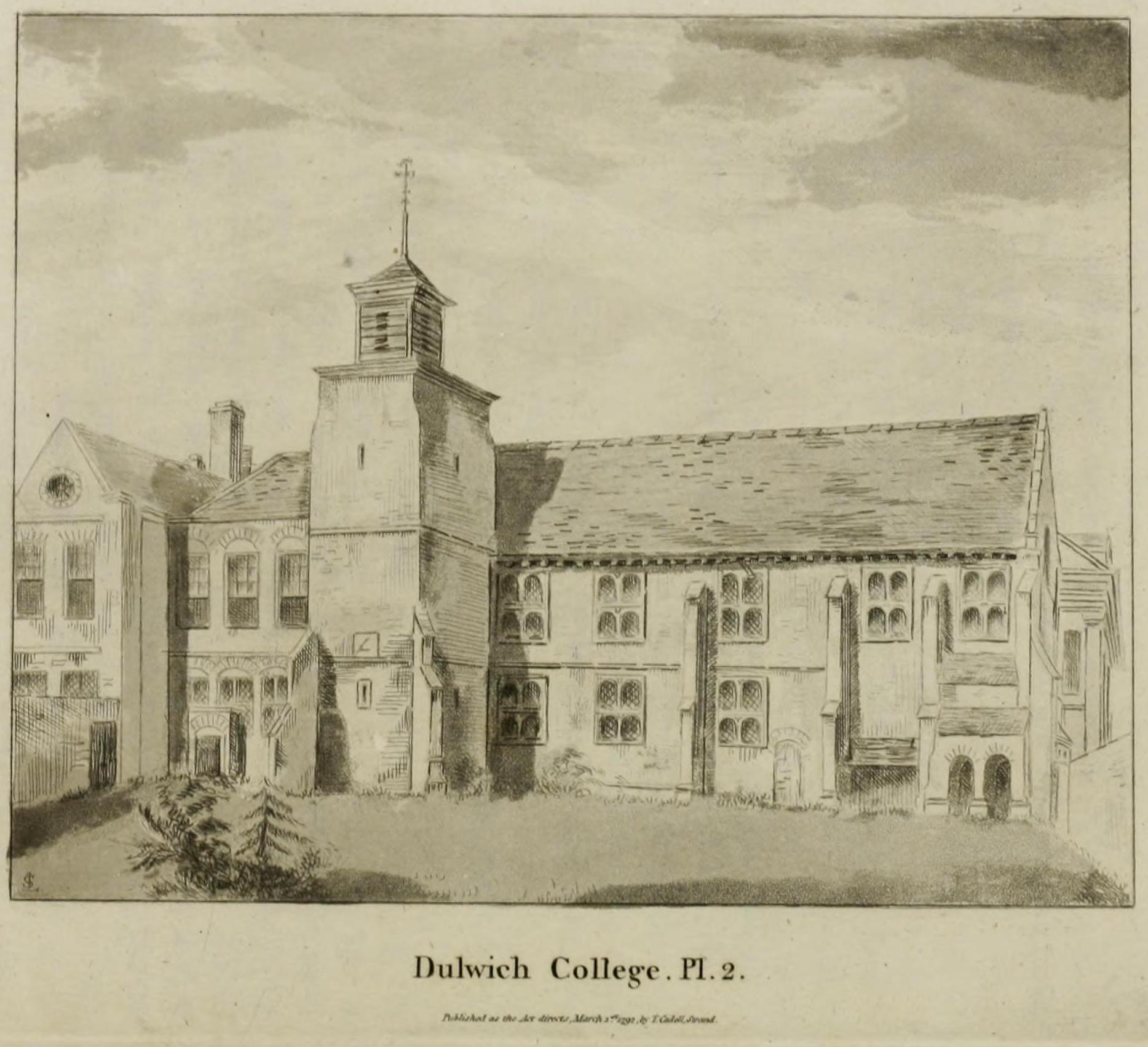
1792 sketches of the College, from Daniel Lysons' The Environs of London

The next 200 years were beset by both external difficulties such as diminishing financial fortunes and failing buildings as well as internal strife between the various Members of the college over problems both major and minor. The official visitor, the Archbishop of Canterbury, whose function was to see that the statutes were obeyed, was called in many times to sort out these issues. The lack of a disinterested body of governors and having no official connection to the universities of Oxford or Cambridge contributed significantly to the school not fulfilling Alleyn's vision in its first 200 years. Some notable Masters did preside over the college in this time including James Allen (the first master to drop the 'y' from his surname) who in 1741 made over to the college six houses in Kensington, the rents of which were to be used in the establishment of two little schools in Dulwich, one for boys from the village, the other for girls to read and sew, from which James Allen's Girls' School arose.

=== 1808: Dulwich College Building Act ===
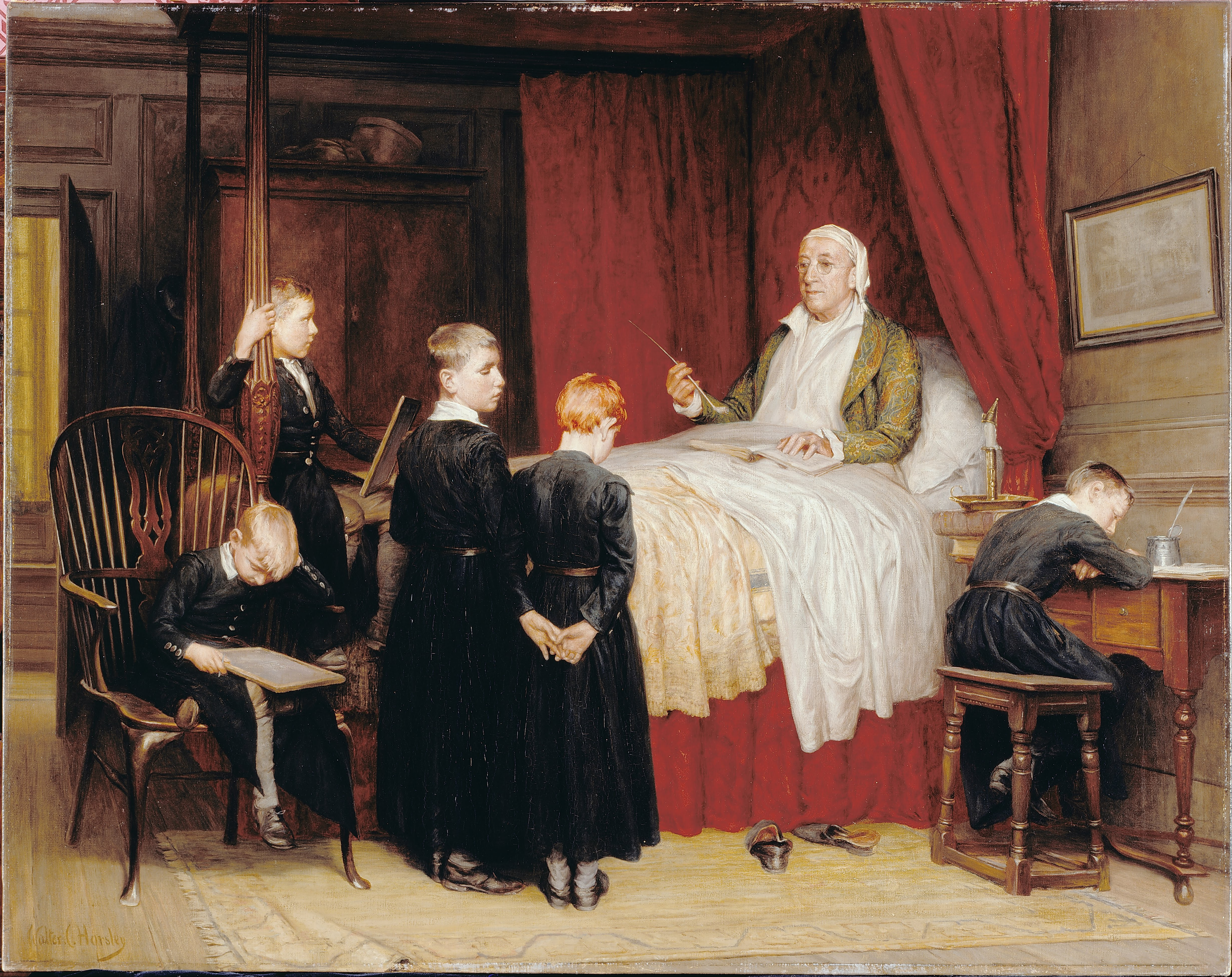
Walter Charles Horsley's Old-time Tuition at Dulwich College, 1828, painted more than half a century after the time it depicts, illustrated the stark contrast with the grand and large-scale New College.

Dulwich Inclosure Act 1805
- Act of Parliament
- Parliament of the United Kingdom
- Long title: An Act for inclosing Lands in the Manor of Dulwich, in the County of Surrey.
- Citation: 45 Geo. 3. c. 102 Pr.

Dates
- Royal assent: 12 July 1805

Dulwich College Estate Act 1808
- Act of Parliament
- Parliament of the United Kingdom
- Long title: An Act for enabling the Master, Warden, Fellows, Brethren, Sisters, and Scholars of the College of God's Gift in Dulwich, in the County of Surrey, to grant a Lease or Leases of certain Estates belonging to the same College, in the said County, pursuant to an Agreement entered into for that Purpose; and also to grant Building Leases of other Parts of the same Estates, and for other Purposes therein-mentioned.
- Citation: 48 Geo. 3. c. cxvi

Dates
- Royal assent: 18 June 1808

Text of statute as originally enacted

Having already obtained the Dulwich Inclosure Act 1805 (45 Geo. 3. c. 102 Pr.) allowing them to enclose and develop 130 acres (0.53 km^{2}) of common land within the manor, the college was granted the power by the Dulwich College Estate Act 1808 (48 Geo. 3. c. cxvi) to extend the period of which leases ran from twenty-one years as laid down by Alleyn, to eighty-four years, thus attracting richer tenants and bringing in vast sums of money. The additional wealth of the college eventually resulted in the Charity Commission setting up an enquiry into the advisability of widening the application of the funds to those extra beneficiaries Alleyn had specified in later amending clauses to the foundation's original statutes. Although the Master of the Rolls, Lord Langdale rejected the appeal in 1841 on the grounds that Alleyn had no right to alter the original statutes, he did express dissatisfaction with the college's provision of education.

=== 1842: The Grammar School of the College of God's Gift ===
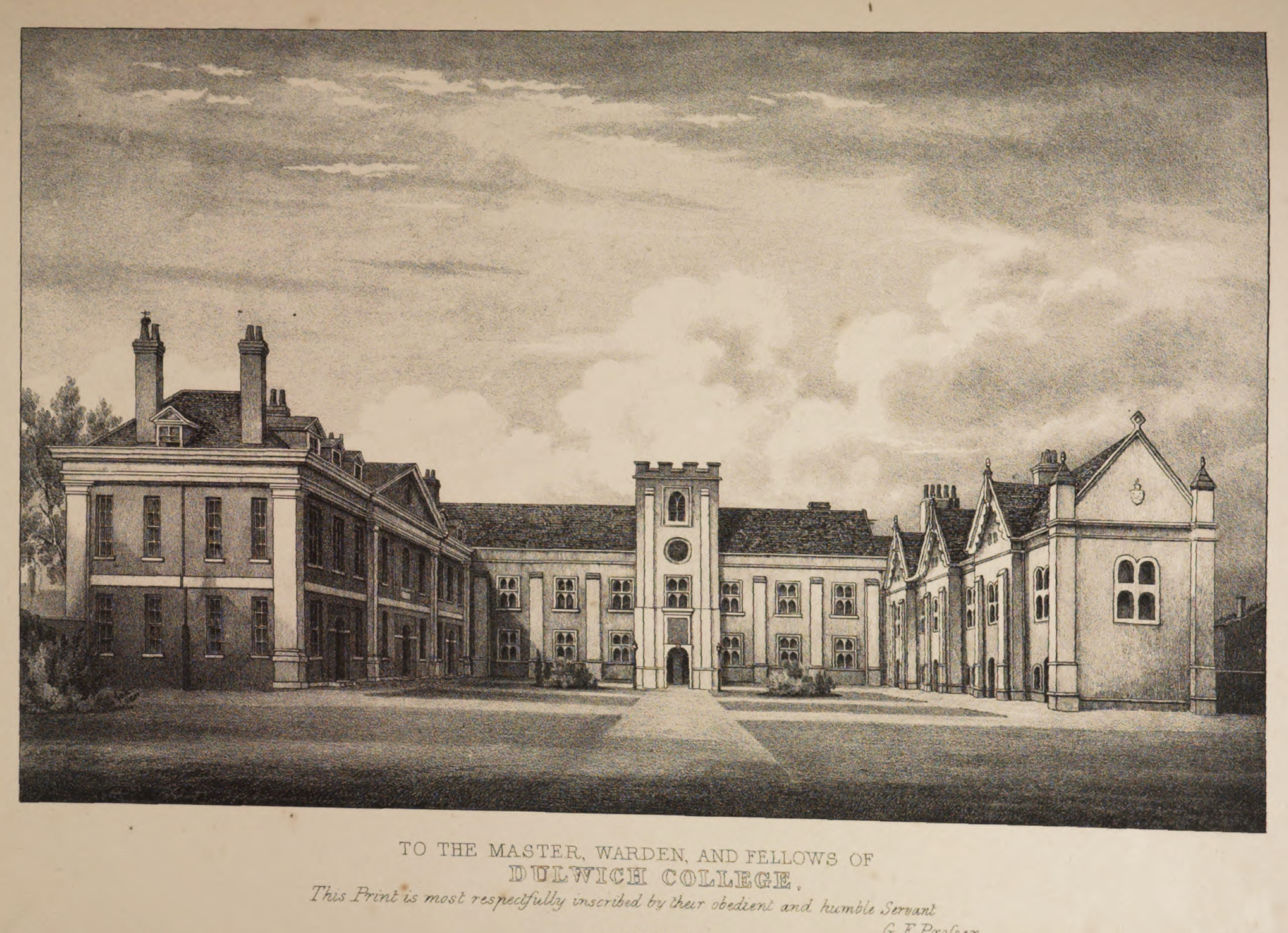
1828 sketch of the college

Immediately following this criticism, the Grammar School of the College of God's Gift was established in 1842 for the education of poor boys from Dulwich and Camberwell. To this school were transferred the boys of the James Allen Foundation, leaving James Allen's school to be for girls only. The Old Grammar School, as it became known, was erected in 1841 opposite the Old College, having been designed by Sir Charles Barry, the architect of the Palace of Westminster. It still exists today. The foundation scholars of the college, however, continued to receive an education far short of Alleyn's vision, however, despite further attempts at reform by the visitor. In 1854, the college was investigated by a new commission set up by the Charitable Trusts Act 1853 and the scheme resulting from their investigation led to the Dulwich College Act 1857 (20 & 21 Vict. c. 84). The grammar school educated around 100 boys:

- 1856: Upper School – 30 boys; Lower School – 50-80 boys

=== 1857: Alleyn's College of God's Gift ===
Dulwich College Act 1857
- Act of Parliament
- Parliament of the United Kingdom
- Long title: An Act for confirming a Scheme of the Charity Commissioners for the College of God's Gift in Dulwich in the County of Surrey, with certain Alterations.
- Citation: 20 & 21 Vict. c. 84

Dates
- Royal assent: 25 August 1857

Text of statute as originally enacted

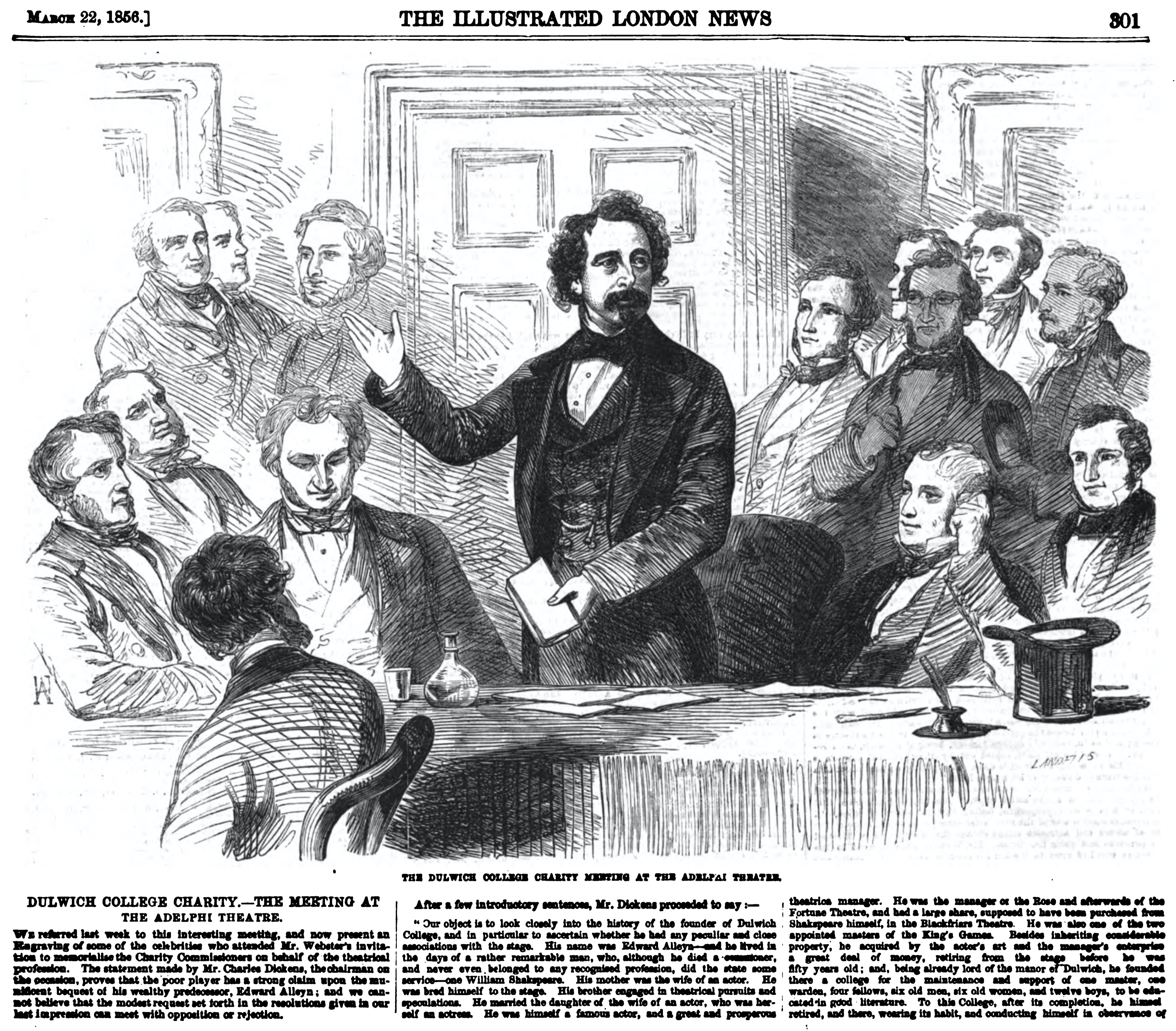
Charles Dickens presiding over a meeting at the Adelphi Theatre to discuss the future of the College of God's Gift, March 1856

The College of God's Gift became Alleyn's College of God's Gift when, on 25 August 1857 the Act for confirming a Scheme of the Charity Commissioners for the College of God's Gift in Dulwich in the County of Surrey, also known as the Dulwich College Act 1857 (20 & 21 Vict. c. 84), dissolved the existing cooperation and the charity was reconstituted with the new name. When the charity was reconstituted in 1857 it was split into two parts with a joint board of governors: the educational and the "eleemosynary" (for the charity). Emphasis was given 3:1 however in favour of the former: Sir Francis Bacon would have approved. The master, warden, four fellows and 12 servants were pensioned off although Alleyn's wishes were, and continue to be respected, as sixteen pensioners (being the equivalent of 12 poor brothers and sisters plus four fellows) still live in flats in the Old College looked after by a warden. As for the master, he was to still be appointed as the head of the new school.

The school master of the college in this new form was Reverend Alfred Carver (Master from April 1857 to April 1883), a position accompanying with it the title; “Master of Alleyn’s College of God’s Gift”. As well as being Headmaster of the new Upper School, the position had also the responsibility of education generally. It is often stated that he was also the first Master not to share the name of the college’s founder "Alleyn" (or latterly "Allen"), although this assumes too much as the responsibilities of Master, and also Warden, had been taken up by the new Governors of Alleyn’s College: Carver was de-facto the reconstituted college’s new “2nd Fellow”. The number of pupils at the school expanded sharply during Carver's tenure:

- 1858: Upper School – 66 boys; Lower School – 33 boys
- 1859: Upper School – 120 boys; Lower School – 81 boys
- 1870: Upper School (at the "New College") 269 boys; Lower School (at the "Old College") 242 boys
- 1883: Upper School (at the "New College") 535 boys; Lower School (at the "Old College") unknown

The educational college was split into an Upper and Lower school. The Upper school was for boys between 8 and 18 to be taught a wide and detailed syllabus and continued to be colloquially referred to as Dulwich College. The Lower school being for boys between 8 and 16, with lower fees and a syllabus aimed at children of the industrial and poorer classes. The Lower School was the incorporation of the boys from the grammar school’s lower divisions, established in the previous decade and was referred to as The Lower School of Alleyn’s College of God's Gift.

During the 1860s, when the Old College was under repair and the New College had yet to be built, both the Upper and Lower schools were housed in the building of Dulwich College Grammar School. In the summer of 1869 the upper school took possession of the current site, referred to as the New College, but it was not until Founder's Day (21 June) 1870 that the new college was officially opened by the Prince and Princess of Wales. The new college buildings, sited in the 60 acres of Dulwich Common, were designed in a hybrid of Palladian and Gothic styles in red brick and terracotta, by Charles Barry, Jr. (the eldest son of Sir Charles Barry). The lower school alone continued to occupy the Old College in Dulwich Village from 1870 until it was moved to its new (and current) premises in 1887.

=== 1882: Dulwich College separated from Alleyn's School ===
In 1882, following a scheme issued by the Charity Commissioners, an Order in Council was passed after which the Upper and Lower schools were officially split into separate institutions. This followed a period of political debate, resolved at appeal in 1876 at the Privy Council where Lord Selborne ruled in Alfred Carver's favour. This passed into law as an amendment to the Endowed Schools Act 1869 known as the Scheme for the Management of the Foundations Respectively Known as Alleyn's College of God's Gift at Dulwich, and the Dulwich College Picture Gallery.

The Upper School became Dulwich College (The term used officially, for any institution, for the first time) and the Lower became Alleyn's School, into which the Foundation “Poor” Scholars were transferred. Both schools remained within the Alleyn's College of God's Gift charitable foundation (along with James Allen's Girls' School, St Olave's and St Saviour's Grammar School, and the three Central Foundation schools in Finsbury and Bishopsgate). Both Dulwich College and Alleyn's School were managed by the College Governors who also administered the Chapel and Picture Gallery. The estates and almshouses remained in the hands of the original governing body; renamed the Estates Governors. Beneficiaries' income is derived from the contributions made to them by the Estates Governors, among whom the College Governors are well represented (having eight of the twenty five places)

=== 1995 reconstitution ===
Alleyn's College, the reconstituted form of the charitable foundation set up in 1619, continued to own and manages the ancient Manor of Dulwich in south London and also to manage the foundation schools of Dulwich College, Alleyn's School and James Allen's Girls' School. Although inextricably associated with these schools, it was a distinct entity.

In 1995, a major reorganisation by the trustees and the Charity Commission resulted in the varied component parts of Alleyn's College being separately constituted as independent registered charities.

== Leadership ==
Until the Dulwich College Act 1857, the leaders of the college were known as "masters". The 1857 act created a board of governors, and the 1882 scheme split these in two:

=== Masters of the College of God's Gift ===
- Thomas Alleyn (appointed 1619 (assumed office on death of Founder Edward Alleyn); died 1631)
- Matthias Alleyn (succeeded 1631; died 1642)
- Thomas Alleyn (succeeded 1642; died 1668–9)
- Raph Alleyn (succeeded 1668–9; died 1677–8)
- John Alleyn (succeeded 1677–8; died 1686)
- Richard Alleyn (succeeded 1686; died 1690)
- John Alleyn (succeeded 1690; died 1712)
- Thomas Alleyn (succeeded 1712; died 1721)
- James Allen (formerly Alleyn) (succeeded 1721; died 1746)
- Joseph Allen (succeeded 1746; resigned 1775)
- Thomas Allen (succeeded 1775; died 1805)
- William Allen (succeeded 1805; died 1811)
- Lancelot Baugh Allen (succeeded 1811; resigned 1820)
- John Allen (succeeded 1820; died 1843)
- George John Allen (succeeded 1843; pensioned 1857)

=== Chairmen of the Governors ===
- Edward Smith-Stanley, 13th Earl of Derby (1857-1859)
- Arthur Wellesley, 2nd Duke of Wellington (1859-1862)
- The Revd William Rogers (1862-1882)

=== Chairmen of the Estate Governors ===
- Revd. W. Rogers (until Dec. 1882 )
- Richard Strong (1883-1890)
- William Young (1891-1892)
- Francis Peek (1893-1895)
- Matthew Wallace (1896-1899)
- Thomas John Edwards (1900-1902)
- Marmaduke John Teesdale (1903-1904)
- Robert Coats Cane (1905-1907)
- Edwin Thomas Hall (1908-1910)
- Joseph Russell Tompkins (1911-1914)
- George Crispe Whiteley (1914-1916)
- J. Ratchffe Cousins (1917-1919)
- William Howes, J.P. 1920–1922)

=== Chairmen of the College Governors ===
- Revd. William Rogers (1882-1896)
- Horace Davey, Baron Davey (1896-1907)
- Alfred Comyn Lyall (1907-1911)
- Herbert Eaton, 3rd Baron Cheylesmore
- John Wolfenden, Baron Wolfenden

== Dulwich Picture Gallery ==
The College of God's Gift was bequeathed a large collection of paintings by Francis Bourgeois in 1811, which had originally been intended to form the nucleus of the collection of the last king of Poland, Stanisław August Poniatowski. Following the partitions of Poland the paintings were left to the college, which set up the Dulwich Picture Gallery under a trusteeship in a building designed by Sir John Soane, which became Britain's first public art gallery. Since 1995 the Gallery has been an independent registered charity.

== Gallery of the Old College ==
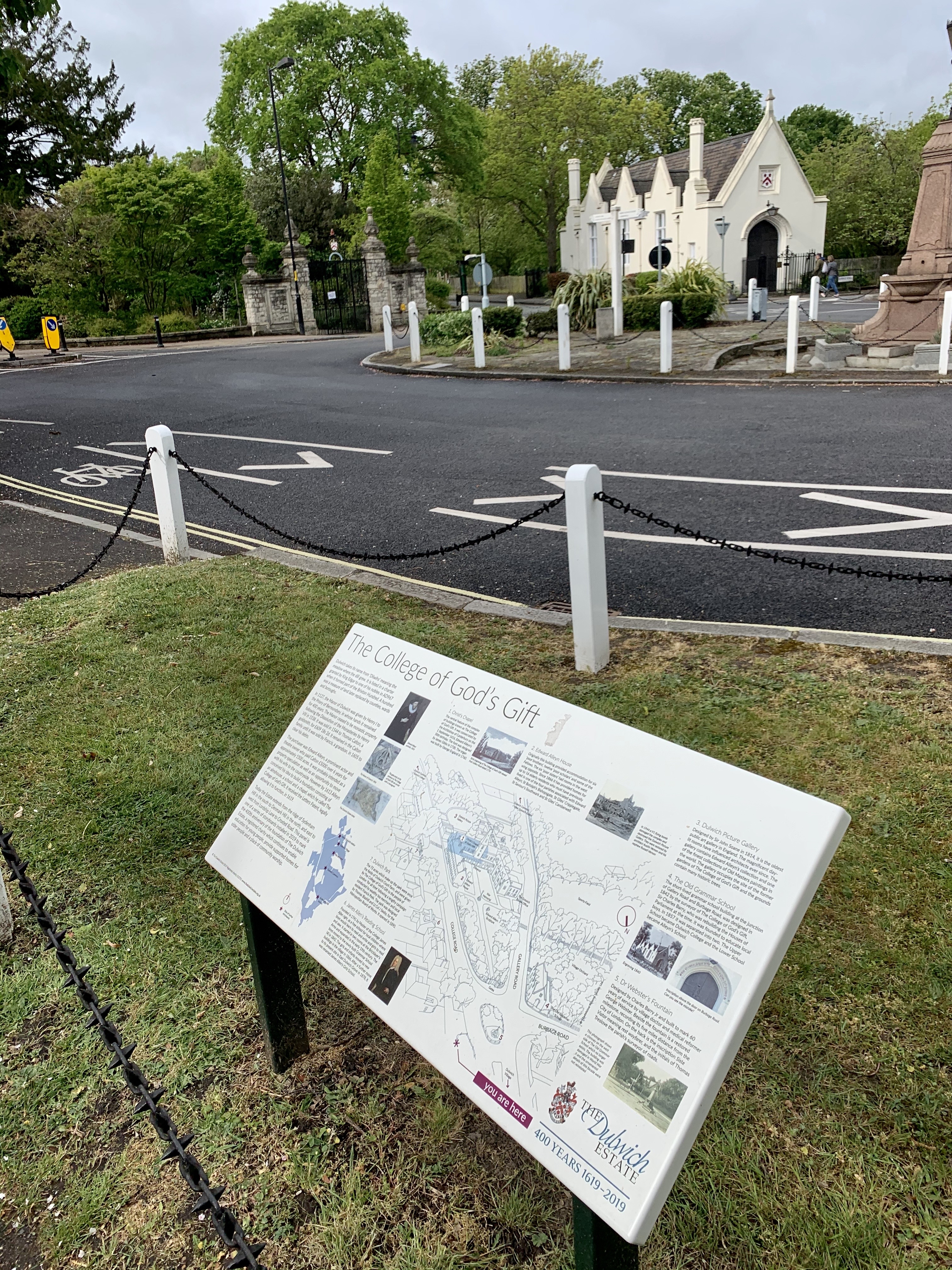
The Old College and the Old Grammar School

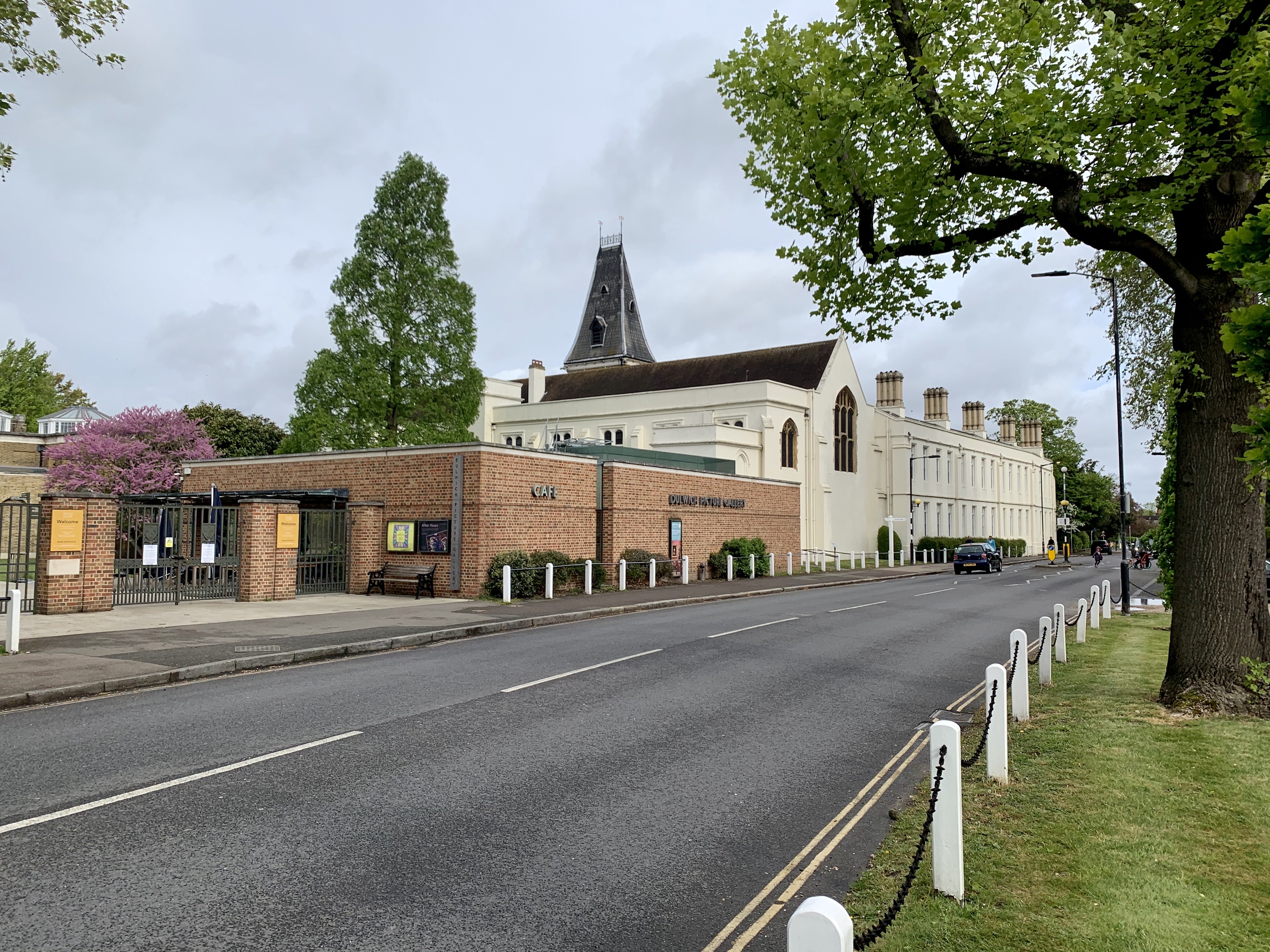
The Old College and the Picture Gallery

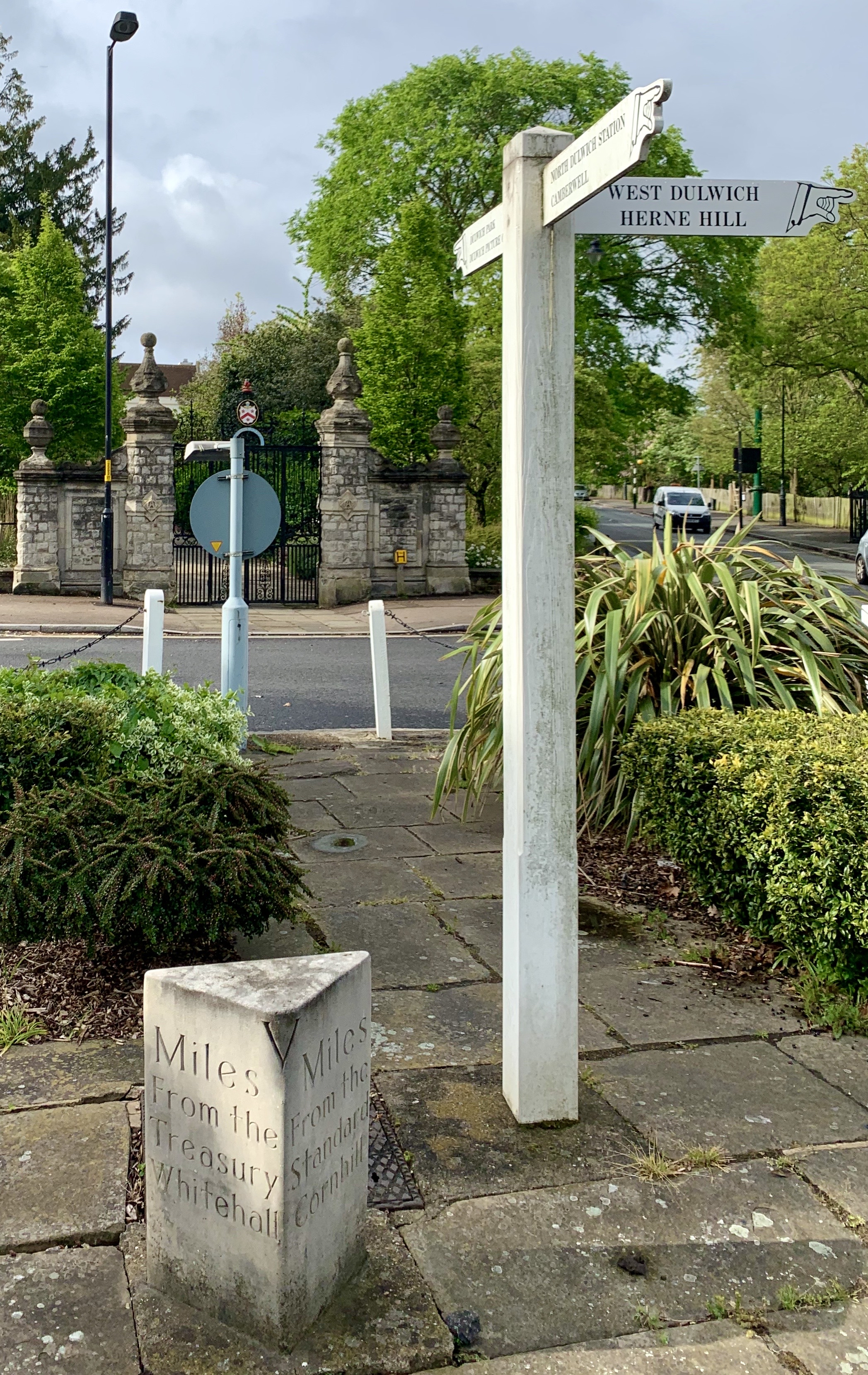
Milestone, showing five miles to the centre of the City of London

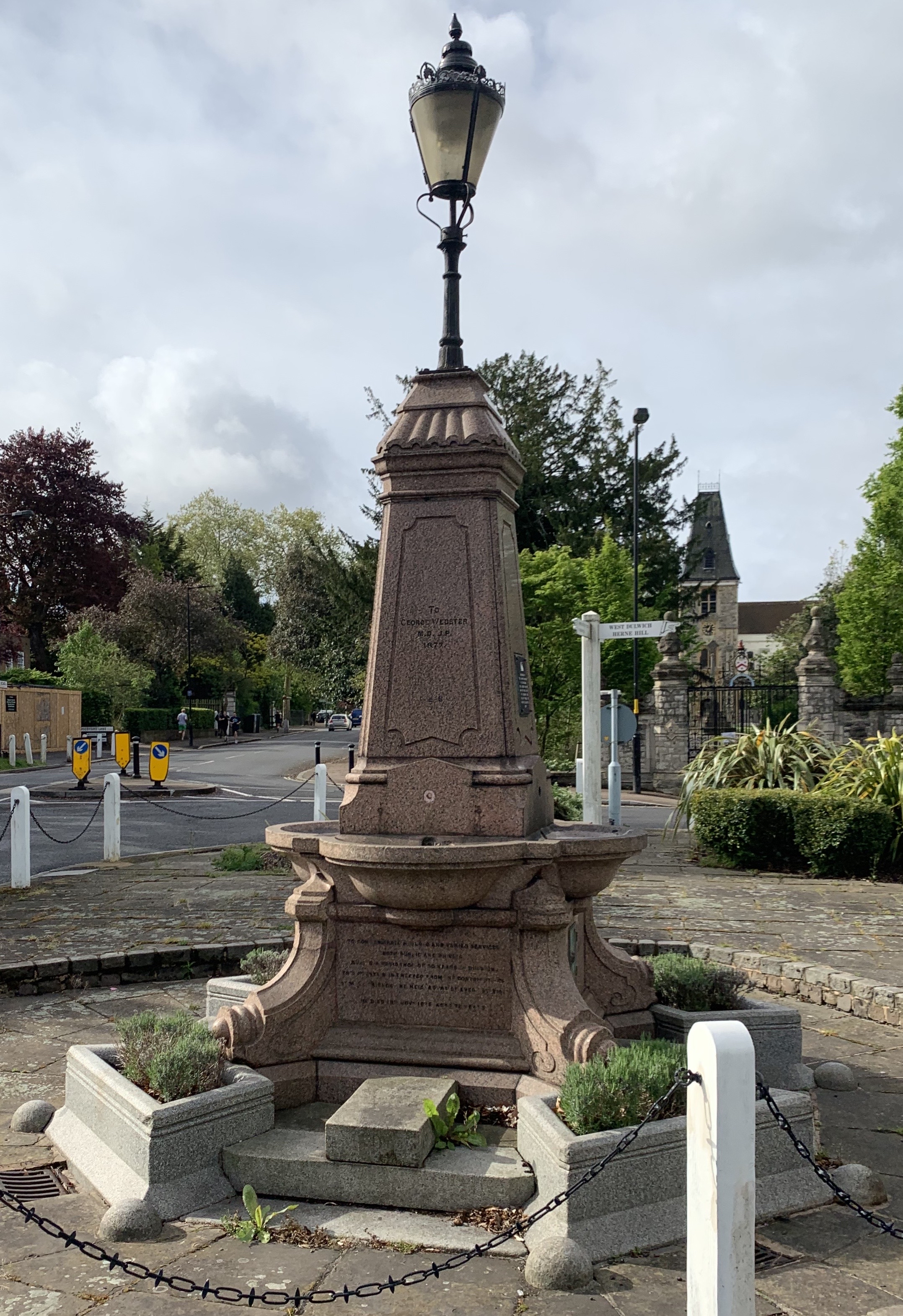
Fountain to Dr George Webster, founder of the first British Medical Association in 1836

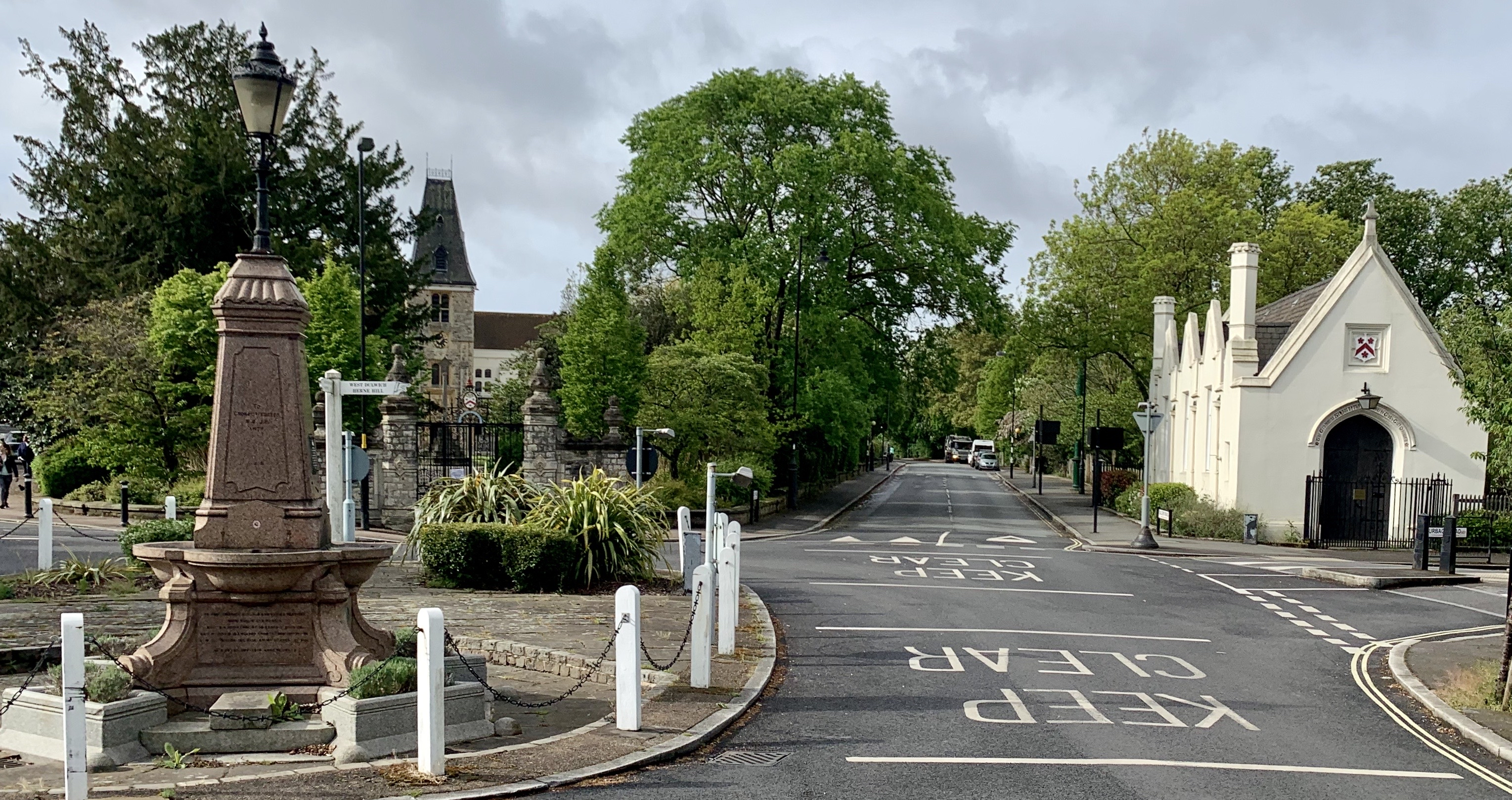
The Old College, Dr Webster's Fountain, and the Old Grammar School

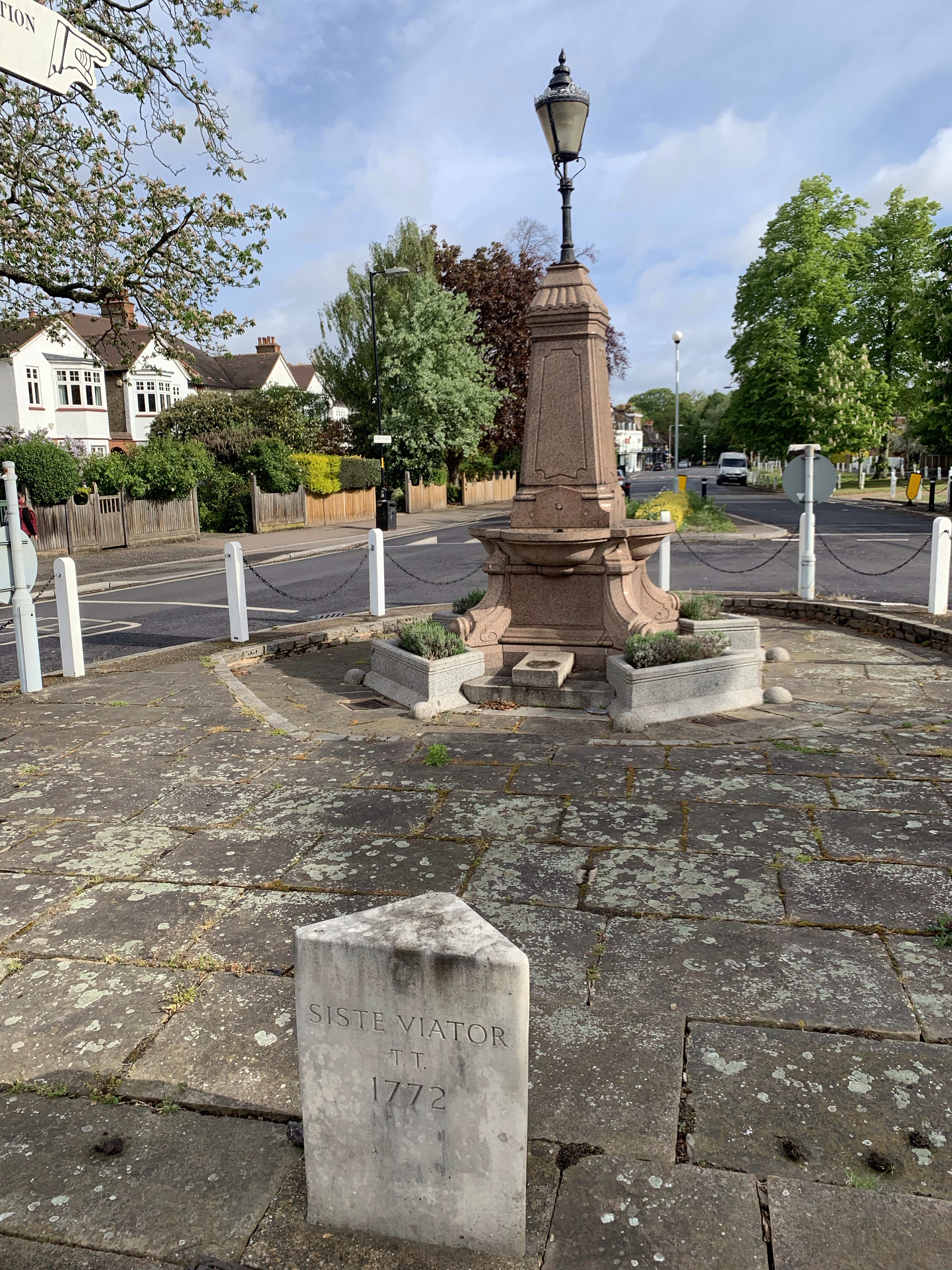
Dr Webster's Fountain and milestone

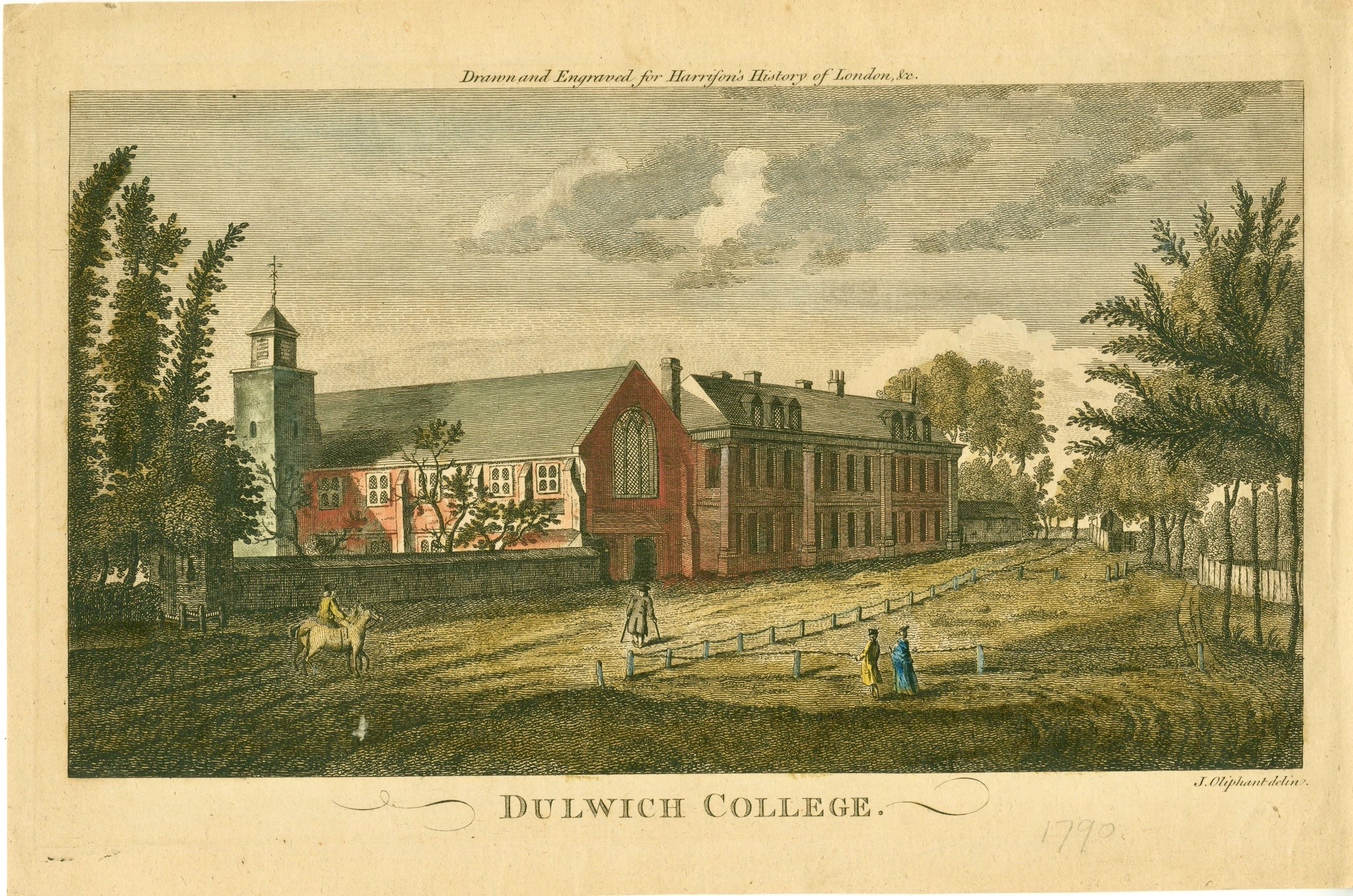
19th century

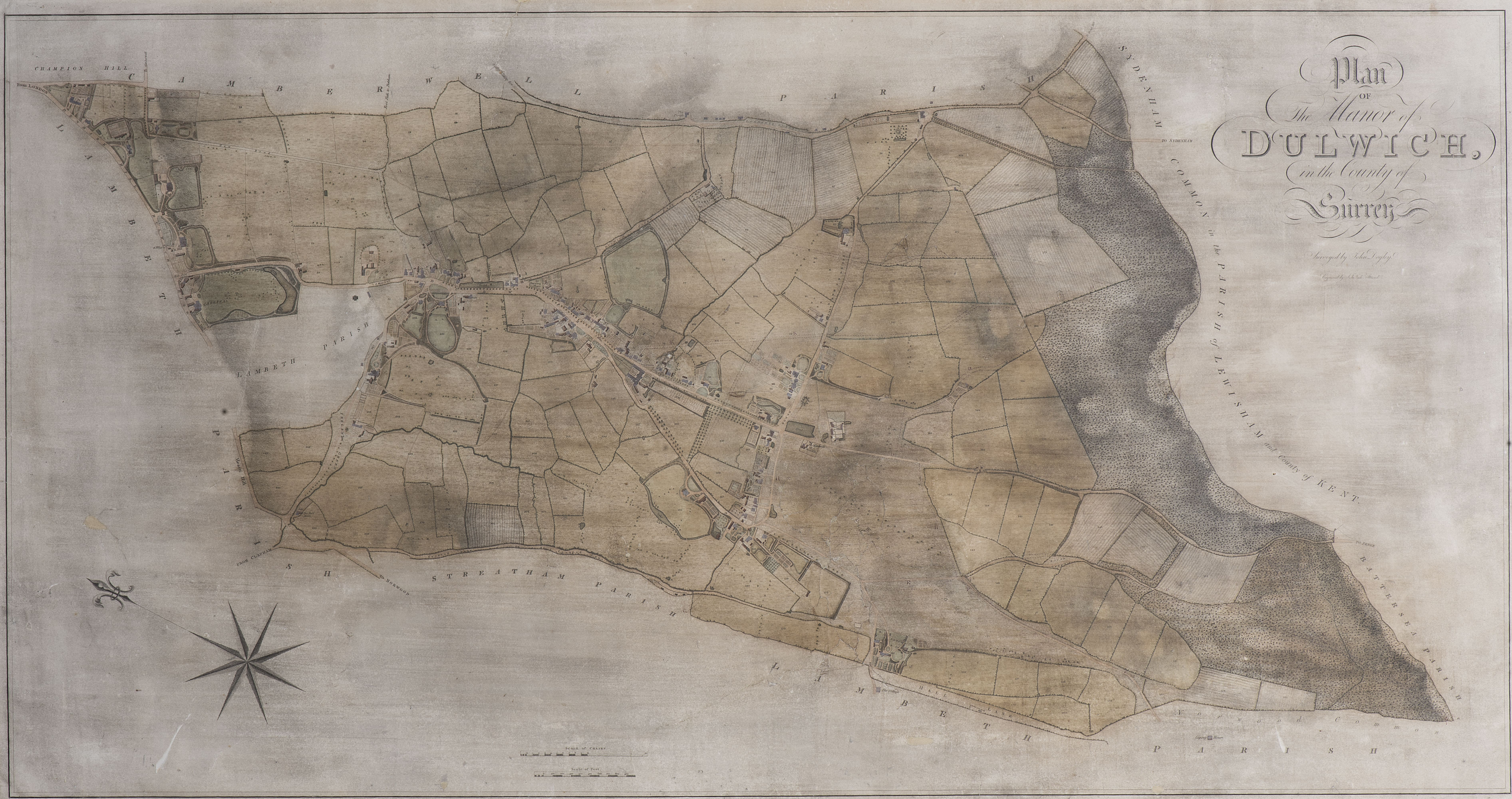
1806 map of the college's estate

1876 map of the college's estate

1932 map of the college's estate

== See also ==
- Dulwich Wood

== Bibliography ==
- Darby, W. (1966). Dulwich Discovered. Dulwich: William Darby.
- Hodges, Sheila (1981). God's Gift: A Living History of Dulwich College. London: Heinemann. ISBN 978-0-435-32450-6.
