= Raph Alleyn =

Raph Alleyn (died 24 January 1677/8) was a seventeenth-century London surgeon, and the fourth College of God's Gift.

== Early life ==
He was of the parish of St Clement Danes and it is unlikely that he shared any blood-ties with Edward Alleyn. He did remain unmarried, thus meeting Edward Alleyn's requirements as laid out the Deed of Foundation of the College of God's Gift in Dulwich, which was then colloquially referred to as "Dulwich College", that the Master and Warden should always be unmarried and of Alleyn's blood, and surname, or failing that of his surname.

== Career ==
Before becoming Warden on 16 May 1642, he had practiced as a surgeon. On Thomas Alleyn's death he became Master on 15 March 1668/9. He has been grouped as one of a "sad procession of non-entities" who, with few exceptions in the period between the Founder's death and when the college was reconstituted in 1857, on becoming Warden or Master, had as their chief object to lead the pleasantest life possible with little regard to furthering Alleyn's directions to provide every poor scholar with adequate preparation for the world.

He died on 24 January 1677/8 and was succeeded in the post by the surgeon John Alleyn who had served as Warden in the period that Raph had been Master. He was buried in the College Chapel.

Academic offices
Preceded by Thomas Alleyn	Master of the College of God's Gift; 1668-69 to 1677-78	Succeeded by John Alleyn
