= John Alleyn (surgeon) =

English surgeon (died 1686)

John Alleyn (died 25 March 1686) was a seventeenth-century London surgeon and the fifth Master of the College of God's Gift.

== Early life ==
He was of the son of Matthias Alleyn, the second Master of the same college and was of St Margaret's parish near Rochester. His father had been a cousin of the Founder of the college, Edward Alleyn and he was the last Warden or Master to have a definite family relationship to the Founder. He did not remain unmarried but in other respects met Edward Alleyn's requirements as laid out the Deed of Foundation of the College of God's Gift in Dulwich, which was soon colloquially referred to as "Dulwich College", that the Master and Warden should always be unmarried and of Alleyn's blood, and surname, or failing that of his surname. His wife, Lucia, bore him a son who died as an infant.

== Career ==
Before becoming Warden on 5 April 1669, he had practiced as a surgeon. He became Master on 24 January 1677/1678. He has been grouped as one of the "sad procession of non-entities" who, with few exceptions, had little regard to furthering Alleyn's directions to provide every poor scholar with adequate preparation for the world. However, he was known to be skilled in music, practiced as a surgeon, and was awarded an Honorary DCL by the University of Oxford in January 1670.

He died on 25 March 1686. He was buried in the College Chapel along with his wife.

Academic offices
Preceded by Raph Alleyn	Master of the College of God's Gift; 1677–78 to 1686	Succeeded by Richard Alleyn
