= Thomas Alleyn (Barber-Surgeon) =

17th-century college master in London

Thomas Alleyn (died 27 March 1631) was a prominent seventeenth century London citizen and the first Master of the College of God's Gift.

== Early life ==
He was born the cousin of Edward Alleyn in London. He married and had one son and two daughters.

== Career ==
Prior to his appointment, Thomas Alleyn had become a citizen of London and was a barber-surgeon of London. When Edward Alleyn laid out the Deed of Foundation of the College of God's Gift in Dulwich, which was soon colloquially referred to as "Dulwich College", he stipulated that the Master and Warden should always be unmarried and of Alleyn's blood, and surname, and if the former was impossible then at least of Alleyn's surname.

Thomas met the criteria of being of Edward Alleyn's blood and surname, although he was married. Edward Alleyn named him in the Deed of Foundation although such was Edward Alleyn's continued involvement in his charitable concern that Thomas did not assume office until Edward Alleyn's death in 1626.

He died on 27 March 1631 and was succeeded in the post by his cousin Matthias Alleyn who had served as Warden in the period that Thomas had been Master.

Academic offices
Preceded by Newly Created; The office of Master was not assumed until the death of Edward Alleyn in 1626	Master of the College of God's Gift; 1619–1631	Succeeded by Matthias Alleyn
