= Alfred Carver =

Master of Dulwich College

Alfred James Carver (22 March 1826 – 25 July 1909) was a noted educationalist and cleric. He is often credited as being the first Master of Dulwich College (from 1858 to 1883). However technically this isn’t so, he in fact being the first, and only, Master of Alleyn’s College of God’s Gift; a title that came with the Headmastership of that College’s Upper School, during a brief period that the College was so structured (corresponding exactly with the time Carver held the positions.)

== Early life ==
Carver was born the son of James Carver. He was educated at St Paul's School and went on to Trinity College, Cambridge where he was the Bell Scholar in 1845 and the winner of the Burney Prize Essay. He received a first class degree in the Classical Tripos and Senior Optime Maths in 1849. He received his MA in 1852. From 1850 to 1853 he was a Fellow of Queens' College.

He married Eliza Peek (daughter of William Peek of the tea merchants Peek, Winch & Co.) on 19 July 1853 with whom he had two sons and five daughters. Both his sons and two of his daughter's husbands went to Dulwich College.

== Career ==
Having completed his education he went on to become Surmaster from 1852 to 1858 at St Paul's School (London). He was also the University of Cambridge Examiner for the Classical Tripos between 1857 and 1858. He took up the post of Master of Alleyn’s College of God's Gift in Dulwich in 1858 (For 200 years or more, the College had been almost exclusively known colloquially as "Dulwich College"): What had been the 'College of God's Gift at Dulwich' had become 'Alleyn's College of God's Gift' when, on 25 August 1857 the Dulwich College Act dissolved the existing corporation, reconstituted it as a charity, with new name, replaced its “Master” and “Warden” with a Board of Governors and created the educational positions that Carver now filled. This educational side of the new college (three quarters of the whole) was split into an Upper and Lower school (based on syllabus differences, not age) both of which, holding the office of Master of Alleyn’s College, Carver ultimately controlled. Under Carver, the formation of the Upper School as one of the recognisable great Public Schools of England began. The buildings which the school now occupies were built. The present school colours and school magazine were established in the 1860s and 1870s, as were school societies such as Debating and Natural Science. By the time Canon Carver retired in 1883, the school that hereon would, officially, now be “Dulwich College”, was said to have expanded more rapidly in the previous 25 years than any other establishment and to be holding its own at universities, to have won a large number of places of honour in the Indian and Home Civil Service and at the Royal Military College of Woolwich and to be well represented amongst the public schools medals of the Royal Geographical Society and the prizes of the Art Schools of the Royal Academy.

In Carver's time, Alleyn’s College of God’s Gift, or perhaps more to the point; its income and assets, were the constant focus of attention of both the Charity Commissioners, and other parties (including its own Board of Governors, and the outlying parishes named in Edward Alleyn's original Statutes and Ordinances for his original Corporation) and under pressure to reorganise itself, and divert much of its income to other schemes. Canon Carver resisted these pressures for many years, finally winning an appeal in 1876 at the highest possible point (the Privy Council) where Lord Selbourne ruled in his favour. In 1882, the Charity Commissioners finally issued a scheme which Canon Carver found acceptable. This passed into law by Act of Parliament and resulted in the Upper and Lower schools being officially split into separate institutions. The Upper School was renamed Dulwich College (The term now used officially for the first time) and the Lower; Alleyn's School. Both schools remained within the Alleyn's College of God's Gift charitable foundation. Canon Carver retired at this point (he wished to demonstrate his motives had been altruistic, and in any case, his working relationship by now with the Board of Governors was disfunctional.), as such being the first headmaster to be both appointed and retired by Act of Parliament. (The position of Master of Alleyn’s College was demised; its functions taken up by a second “educational” Board of Governors. Subsequent Headmasters of the Upper School are now known as “Masters of the College”; an allusion to the position of Master replaced by Governors on the passing of the 1857 “Dulwich College” Act.)

As a cleric, he had been ordained as a deacon in 1853 and a priest in 1854. He was the curate of St Olave, Old Jewry from 1854 to 1857 and in 1861 received his Doctorate of Divinity. In 1882 he was made the Honorary Canon of Rochester.

He also served as chairman of James Allen's Girls' School, another of the foundation schools of which Dulwich College is a part, and he was Vice President of the Royal Naval School, Eltham.

Carver died at "Lynnhurst", his home in Streatham, on 25 July 1909. He is remembered at Dulwich College by the organ in the Great Hall, a wing of the old school library and reredos of the chapel. A temporary boarding house was also named after him. He was buried at West Norwood Cemetery where he has an elaborate memorial, near the former site of the episcopal chapel. A portrait of Carver by Samuel Melton Fisher, R.A., O.A., painted in 1882 is in the collection of Dulwich Picture Gallery.
