= Lancelot Baugh Allen =

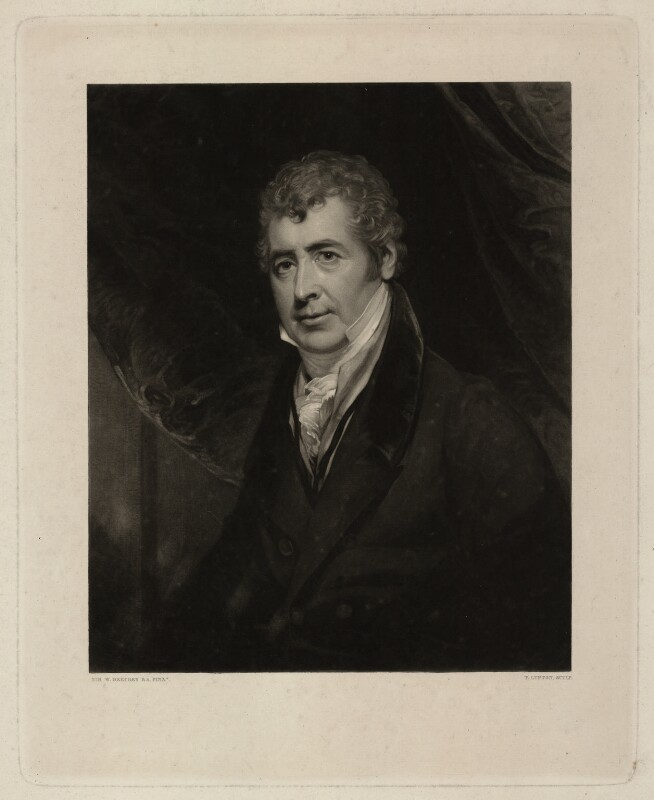
Lancelot Baugh Allen

Lancelot Baugh Allen (1 January 1774 – 28 October 1845) was Master of the College of God's Gift in Dulwich from 1811 to 1820.

He was the son of John Bartlett Allen, a local landowner and colliery owner in Cresselly, Pembrokeshire. Allen had one younger brother, John Hensleigh Allen, MP for Pembrokeshire, and nine sisters whose husbands included Josiah Wedgwood II of the Wedgwood pottery firm, Sir James Mackintosh (MP), John Wedgwood the horticulturist and Jean Charles Léonard de Sismondi, the historian.

Allen studied at Westminster School and Trinity College, Cambridge, where he was elected a scholar "but not admitted, in consequence of his refusal to take the statutable oath." He was later admitted at Lincoln's Inn however, on 9 May 1798, called to the Bar in 1803 and later admitted at the Inner Temple, London on 21 June 1819.

His other occupations included police magistrate of Union Hall, Southwark, 1819-1925, clerk in the Petty Bag Office in 1824 and one of the Six Clerks in Chancery, 1825-1842.

Two marriages gave Allen five children. In 1820 he married Caroline Jane Romilly who gave him two sons, George Baugh Allen and Edmund Edward Allen. His second marriage to Georgina Sarah Bayly in 1841 produced two sons and a daughter: Charles Hensleigh Allen, Clement Francis Romilly Allen, and Elizabeth Jessie Jane Allen (1845-1918).

The National Portrait Gallery, London holds Thomas Goff Lupton's portrait of Allen, after Sir William Beechey. His will is in the UK National Archives, Kew.

Academic offices
Preceded by William Allen	Master of the College of God's Gift; 1820–1843	Succeeded by John Allen
