= Thomas Alleyn (3rd Master of the College of God's Gift) =

Thomas Alleyn (died 15 March 1668/1669) was the third Master of the College of God's Gift.

== Early life ==
He was born in Willen, Buckinghamshire, the son of John Alleyn, cousin of Edward Alleyn. He remained unmarried thus meeting Edward Alleyn's requirements as laid out in the Deed of Foundation of the College of God's Gift in Dulwich, which was soon colloquially referred to as "Dulwich College", that the Master and Warden should always be unmarried and of Alleyn's blood, and surname. He was a legatee in Edward Alleyn's will.

== Career ==
He became warden on 18 April 1631, after his predecessor, and cousin, Matthias became master. On Matthias' death he became master on 9 April 1642. He has been grouped as one of a "sad procession of non-entities" who, with few exceptions in the period between the founder's death and when the college was reconstituted in 1857, on becoming Warden or Master, had as their chief object to lead the pleasantest life possible with little regard to furthering Alleyn's directions to provide every poor scholar with adequate preparation for the world.

He died on 15 March 1668/1669 and was succeeded in the post by the surgeon Raph Alleyn who had served as warden in the period that Thomas had been master. Like Matthias before him, Thomas gave a silver bowl to the college, which is still held by the college.

Academic offices
Preceded by Matthias Alleyn	Master of the College of God's Gift; 1642 to 1668-69	Succeeded by Raph Alleyn
