= UNESCO Reclining Figure 1957–58 =

Sculpture by Henry Moore

- Artist: Henry Moore
- Year: 1957
- Catalogue: LH 416
- Medium: Travertine
- Dimensions: 508 cm (200 in)

UNESCO Reclining Figure 1957–58 is a sculpture by Henry Moore. It was made in a series of scales, from a small plaster maquette, through a half-size working model made in plaster and cast in bronze (LH 415), to a full-size version carved in Roman travertine marble in 1957–1958 (LH 416). The final work was installed in 1958 at the World Heritage Centre, the headquarters of UNESCO (the United Nations Educational, Scientific and Cultural Organisation) at the Place de Fontenoy in Paris. This was Moore's last major public commission in which he created a new work for a specific site; he afterwards generally worked from an existing sketch or model.

== Background ==
Moore was commissioned in 1955 to create a sculpture for the piazza in front of UNESCO's new headquarters in Paris, designed by the architect Marcel Breuer. Early ideas included groups of standing or seated figures, such as Draped Reclining Woman 1957–58 and Draped Seated Woman 1957–58, but he settled on a single and more abstract reclining figure for the UNESCO commission. Some of his early drawings are held by the British Museum.

== Description ==
Moore took several maquettes to Paris in February 1957 for UNESCO representatives to select the best one. The selected sculpture depicts the abstracted form of a reclining female human figure, with recognisable arms, torso, and legs, and a disproportionately small head, with hollows representing eyes. Parallels can be drawn with his early stone Reclining Figure 1929 and his elmwood Reclining Figure 1935–6. Moore made the suggestion that the final work should be carved in white stone, to contrast with the dark windows of the building behind, rather than casting it in bronze as originally intended.

== Working model ==
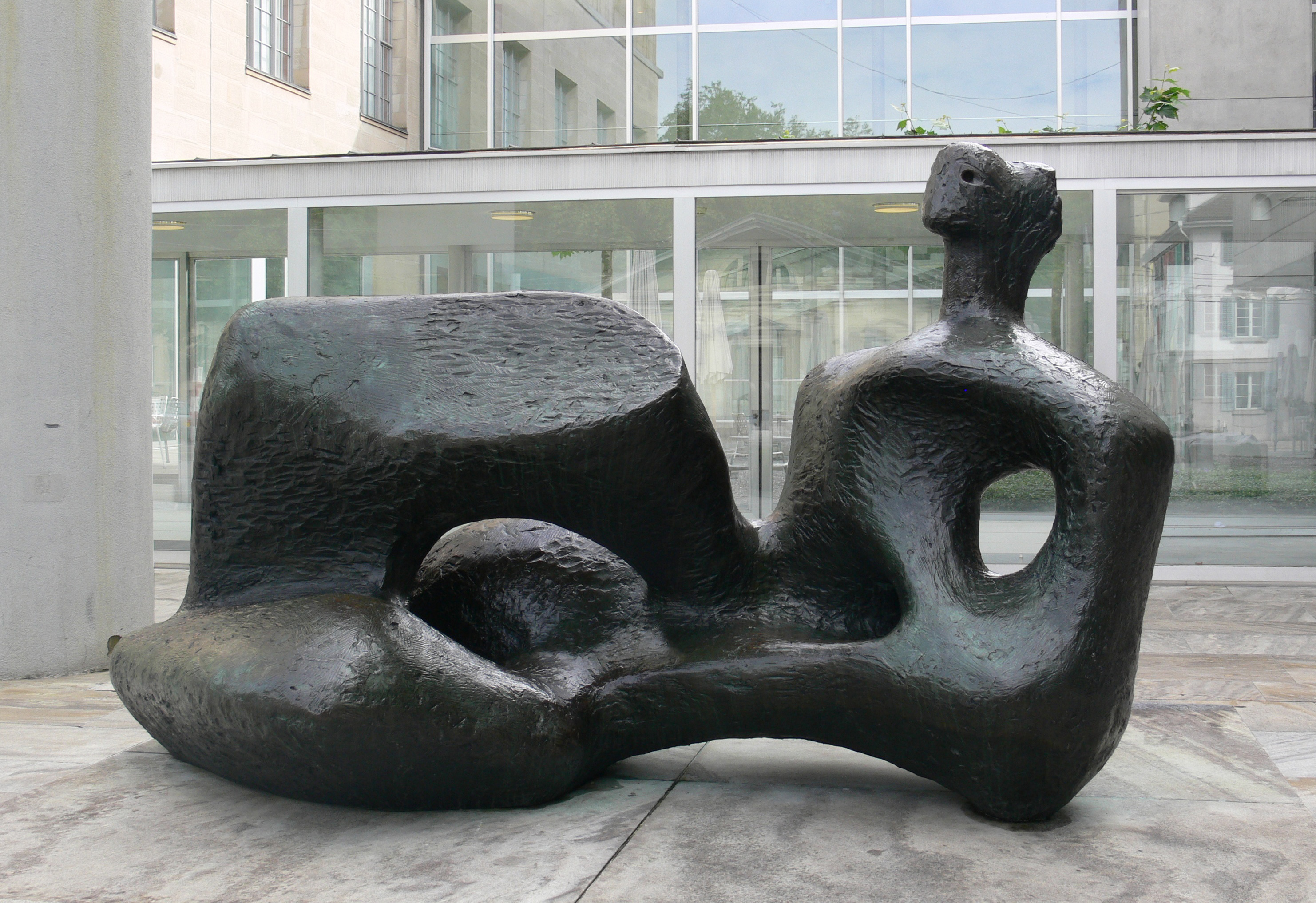
Bronze working model in Zurich in 2010

Moore completed a half-size working plaster model in August 1957, which measures 235 centimetres (93 in). This model was made by applying layers of plaster to an armature, the surface of which was then worked with chisels and other tools.

The plaster working model is held by the Art Gallery of Ontario. The working model (LH 415) was cast in bronze in edition of 7 (5 plus and artists copy, plus one extra cast made for the Tate Gallery), in 1959–1961: three at the Corinthian Art Bronze Foundry in London, two at Fonderie Susse in Paris, and two at the Hermann Noack foundry in Berlin. One example of the 730 kilograms (1,610 lb) bronze is held by the Tate Gallery (cast 2/5). Other examples are held in the collections of the Carnegie Museum of Art in Pittsburgh, the Chicago Art Institute, the Stedelijk Museum in Amsterdam (cast 4/5), and the Kunsthaus Zürich (cast 5/5).

== Full-size sculpture ==
The completed plaster working model was sent to the Société S. Henraux quarry at Querceta, near Seravezza and close to Carrara in northern Italy, in September 1957, where it was copied as a full-size version using four large blocks of Roman travertine marble. Moore visited frequently to check on how the work was progressing, and to finish parts roughed out by the Italian workmen. He took his wife Irina and daughter Mary on one trip, and instituted a tradition of taking regular summer holidays in the area, later buying his own cottage.

The piece being moved, in 1963, to allow for building work

The final sculpture (LH 416) was finished in mid-1958, over 16 feet (4.9 m) long and 8 feet (2.4 m) high, and weighing 38 tons, making it one of Moore's largest sculptures. It was installed near the new Y-shaped UNESCO building at the Place de Fontenoy in Paris in October 1958, and it was in place when the building was inaugurated the following month. The sculpture was moved in 1963, when UNESCO extended its offices, and it is now sited near Building IV.

== See also ==
- List of sculptures by Henry Moore
