= James Allen's Girls' School =

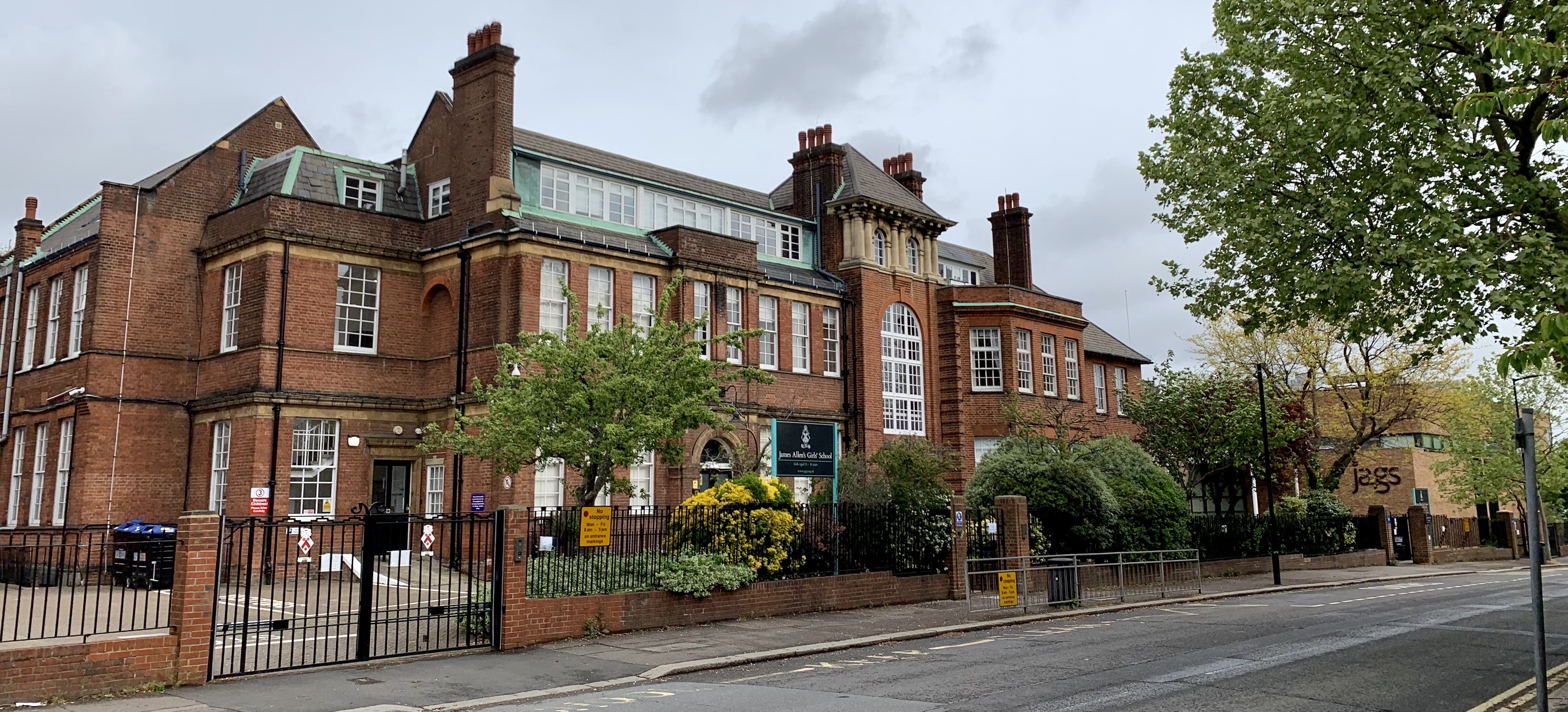

Location
- 144 East Dulwich Grove, Dulwich, London; England; 51°27′18″N 00°05′08″W

Information
- Type: Private day school
- Religious affiliation: Church of England
- Established: 1741; 285 years ago
- Founder: James Allen Warden and later Master of College of God's Gift
- Department for Education URN: 100863 Tables
- Chair of the Governing Board: Mr David Miller
- Headmistress: Mrs Alex Hutchinson
- Gender: Female
- Age: 4 to 18
- Enrolment: 1000 (approx.)
- Colours: Red and blue
- Affiliation: College of God's Gift
- Website: jags.org.uk

James Allen's Girls' School, abbreviated JAGS, is a private day school situated in Dulwich, South London, England. Founded in 1741, it is the second oldest girls' independent school in Great Britain, with Godolphin School in Salisbury being the oldest, founded in 1726.

It is a registered charity and was originally part of Edward Alleyn's College of God's Gift charitable foundation, which also included Alleyn's School and Dulwich College.

It has a senior school for 11- to 18-year-old girls, a prep school for 7- to 11-year-old girls (James Allen's Preparatory School), and a pre-preparatory school for 4- to 7-year-old girls. It is the sister school of Dulwich College and Alleyn's. (Collectively the three are known as "The Dulwich Schools" in the trust deed of the Dulwich Estate and are the main beneficiaries of that charity.)

== History ==
=== 1741: Dulwich Reading School ===
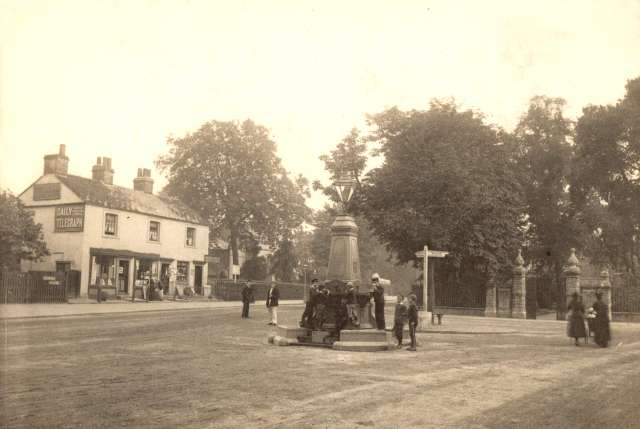
The Bricklayer's Arms, the original site of the Dulwich Reading School

In 1604 the hamlet of Dulwich, its name recorded well before the Norman Conquests, was bought by the Elizabethan actor and entrepreneur, Edward Alleyn, for £4,900. Fourteen years later, Alleyn invested his fortune establishing the College of God's Gift, buying land for a school, a chapel, and the alms houses in Dulwich. In June 1741 James Allen, Master of the College of God's Gift from 1723, founded the original Reading School for poor children, both boys and girls, living in Dulwich.

The Dulwich Reading School started in two rooms in the Bricklayer's Arms, later called The French Horn, in Dulwich Village. The boys were taught to read as preparation for entry to the College of God's Gift, and the girls to read and sew.

=== Early 1800s: Dulwich Free School ===
By the 1800s it was known as the Dulwich Free School. Classes were growing in size, moved into an empty old inn building near the village crossroads, and was renamed the Dulwich Free School.

=== 1842: Dulwich Girls' School ===
The school continued to grow; when the College was reorganised in the 1840s, the boys were moved, leaving the Free School with improved teaching for the girls from 1842. It was renamed The Dulwich Girls' School, with mostly local girls as pupils. It was housed in the building now inhabited by Dulwich Hamlet School.

=== 1878: James Allen's Girls' School ===
The school became known as James Allen's Girls' School in 1878 and finally moved with 141 pupils to its present site in East Dulwich Grove in 1886 with Miss Bettany as its first Headmistress.

Botany Gardens were created in the school grounds soon after Dr Lilian Clarke joined the staff in 1895. It was the first such experiment by a school in this country. In 1902 the first school laboratory equipped solely for botanical study was opened. She was a pioneer and influential in science teaching nationally. In 1890 the school roll had grown to 200 and the curriculum expanded.

=== 20th century ===
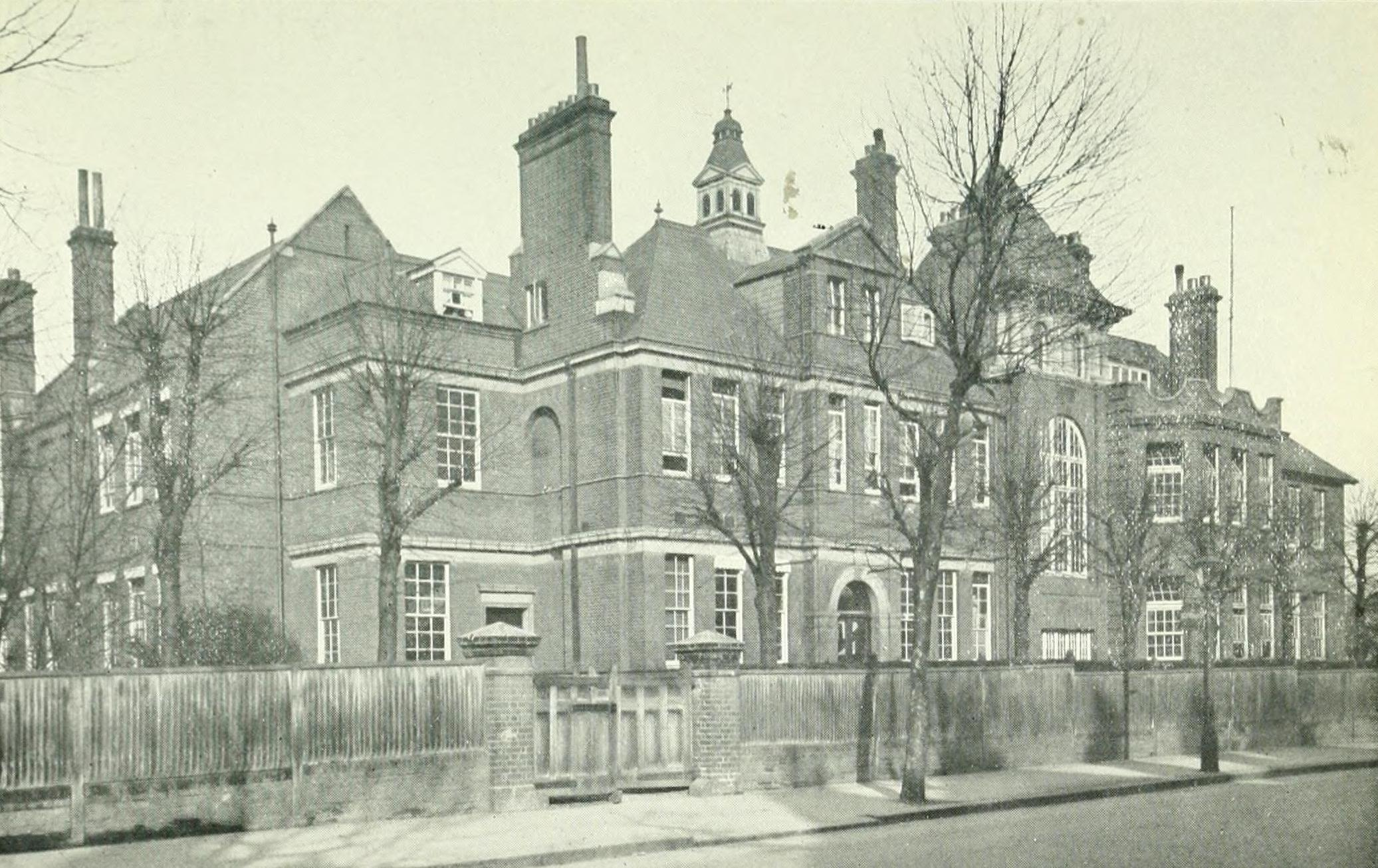
The school in 1922

In the early 20th century, Ralph Vaughan Williams worked at the school as a singing master, and his friend Gustav Holst worked as music teacher at JAGS from 1904 for 16 years. Holst collaborated on Tennyson's Songs from the Princess while at JAGS. He stopped teaching there in 1920 but maintained a close connection with the school. Choral music and singing developed into a core part of school life. By 1916 a school orchestra emerged for the first time and in 1920 JAGS girls participated in Holst's 4th Thaxted Festival in Essex as a farewell to the composer. A series of stained glass windows was installed in 1969 in the Holst Hall.

Sports Mistress Mildred Knott was appointed in 1921; she was an excellent hockey player who became captain of the England hockey team.

The school was evacuated at the beginning of WWII (Sept.1939) to Walthamstow Hall school in Sevenoaks, Kent but in May 1940 returned to Dulwich.

In the 1950s and 60s JAGS expanded and community work was popular. Under Miss Prissian a new theatre was opened by Jonathan Miller in 1983; the first girls' school to have a purpose built theatre.

The 1990s saw a great deal of building work in the school, Community Action was developed and links with local state schools were established.

=== 21st century ===
A new Community Music Centre was officially opened in 2018. The Vaughan Williams Auditorium was named after the composer who worked at the school.

== Notable former pupils ==
- Jenny Ackroyd (1950–2004), vascular surgeon
- Lola Adesioye (born 1980), writer and commentator
- Shani Anderson (born 1975), sprinter
- Ella Balinska (born 1996), actress
- Lucy Boynton (born 1994), actress
- Winifred Brenchley (1883–1953), botanist
- Anita Brookner (1928–2016), Booker Prize–winning author
- Phoebe Campbell (born 1997), actor
- Sarah Cardell (born 1973), CEO of Competition and Markets Authority and solicitor
- Sarah Corp (1975-2016), television producer
- Claire Coutinho (born 1985), shadow Secretary of State for Energy Security and Net Zero
- Dharshini David (born 1973), economist and broadcaster
- Marion Delf-Smith (1883–1980), botanist
- Joanna Dodson (1945-2020), barrister
- Mary Francis (born 1948), civil servant
- Daisy Haggard (born 1978), actress
- Sally Hawkins (born 1976), actress
- Lara Haworth (born 1983), writer
- Mary Hoffman (born 1945), writer
- Sam Holcroft, playwright
- Pamela Huby (1922-2019), philosopher
- Winifred Knights (1899-1947), painter
- Jenny Lau (born 1985), food writer
- Frances Line (1940-2021), radio executive
- Sarah Munby (born 1982), civil servant
- Charlotte Ritchie (born 1989), actress
- Fiona Ross (nurse) (born 1951), nurse and academic
- Catherine Shepherd (born 1975), actress and writer
- Mary Patricia Shepherd (1933–2003), thoracic surgeon
- Katie Snowden (born 1994), middle-distance runner
- Susan Stebbing (1885-1943), philosopher
- Lisa St Aubin de Terán (born 1953), author
- Alison Stephens (1970–2010), mandolin player and film musician
- Beth Willis (born 1977), TV producer
- Florence Yeldham (1877-1945), mathematician
