= Draped Seated Woman 1957–58 =

Sculpture series by Henry Moore

Coordinates: 51.2533°N 7.1404°E

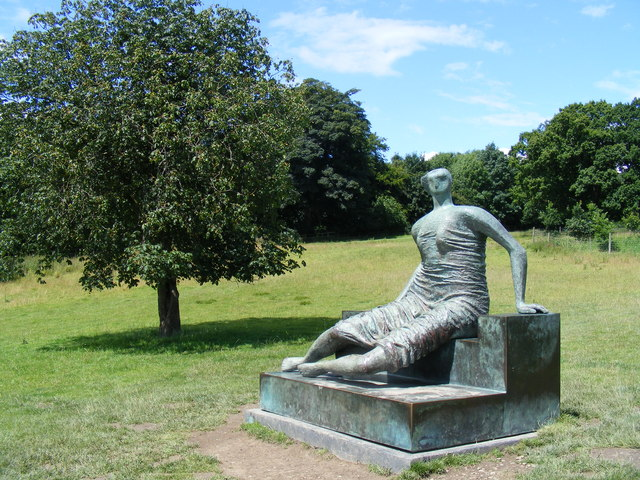
- Cast 2, at Yorkshire Sculpture Park
- Artist: Henry Moore
- Year: 1957-8
- Type: Bronze (edition of 7)
- Dimensions: 185.5 cm (73.0 in)

Draped Seated Woman 1957–58 (LH 428) is a bronze sculpture by the British artist Henry Moore, cast in an edition of seven in the 1950s. The sculpture depicts a female figure resting in a seated position, with her legs folded back to her right, her left hand supporting her weight, and her right hand on her right leg. The drapery emphasises the female figure, but the facial features are abstracted and barely picked out.

It was originally sculpted by Moore in plaster, then produced in bronze in an edition of seven, which are now located around the world.

== Background ==
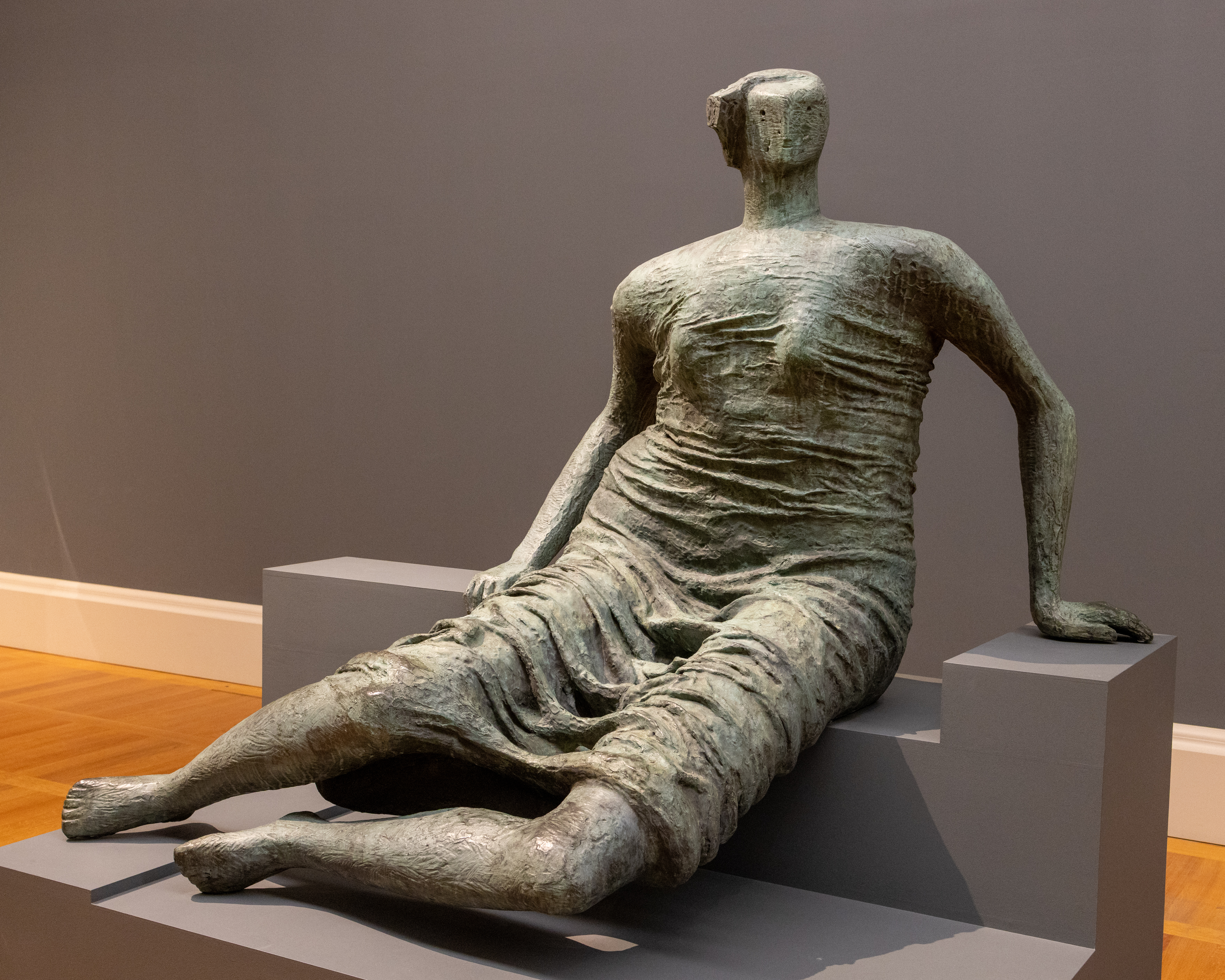
Cast 0 at Tate Britain

Henry Moore was a war artist in the Second World War. He made a series of drawings of people in London sheltering from the Blitz in the Underground, swathed in thick clothes. These drawings sparked an interest in drapery which was renewed by the classical sculptures that Moore saw during a trip to Greece in 1951. He was attracted by the ability of the drapery to draw attention to some parts of the human form by lying tightly on the shoulders, thighs or breasts while concealing other parts where the wrapping falls slack, and also by the varied textures created by small and large folds in the material.

Moore made a series of sculptures of draped human forms in the 1950s after he was commissioned to create a sculpture for the new UNESCO Headquarters building in Paris. He wanted to create a figure in an architectural context, and turned to the seated human form. The first work in the series in 1955 was a maquette, Draped Seated Woman: Figure on Steps (LH 427), cast in a series of 10. This became the working model for the full-size sculpture that became his Draped Seated Woman 1957–58. He also made a similar work Draped Reclining Woman 1957-58. Moore ultimately abandoned these ideas for the UNESCO commission, and his UNESCO Reclining Figure 1957-58 (LH 416) is a much more abstract reclining form in travertine.

== Sculpture and casts ==
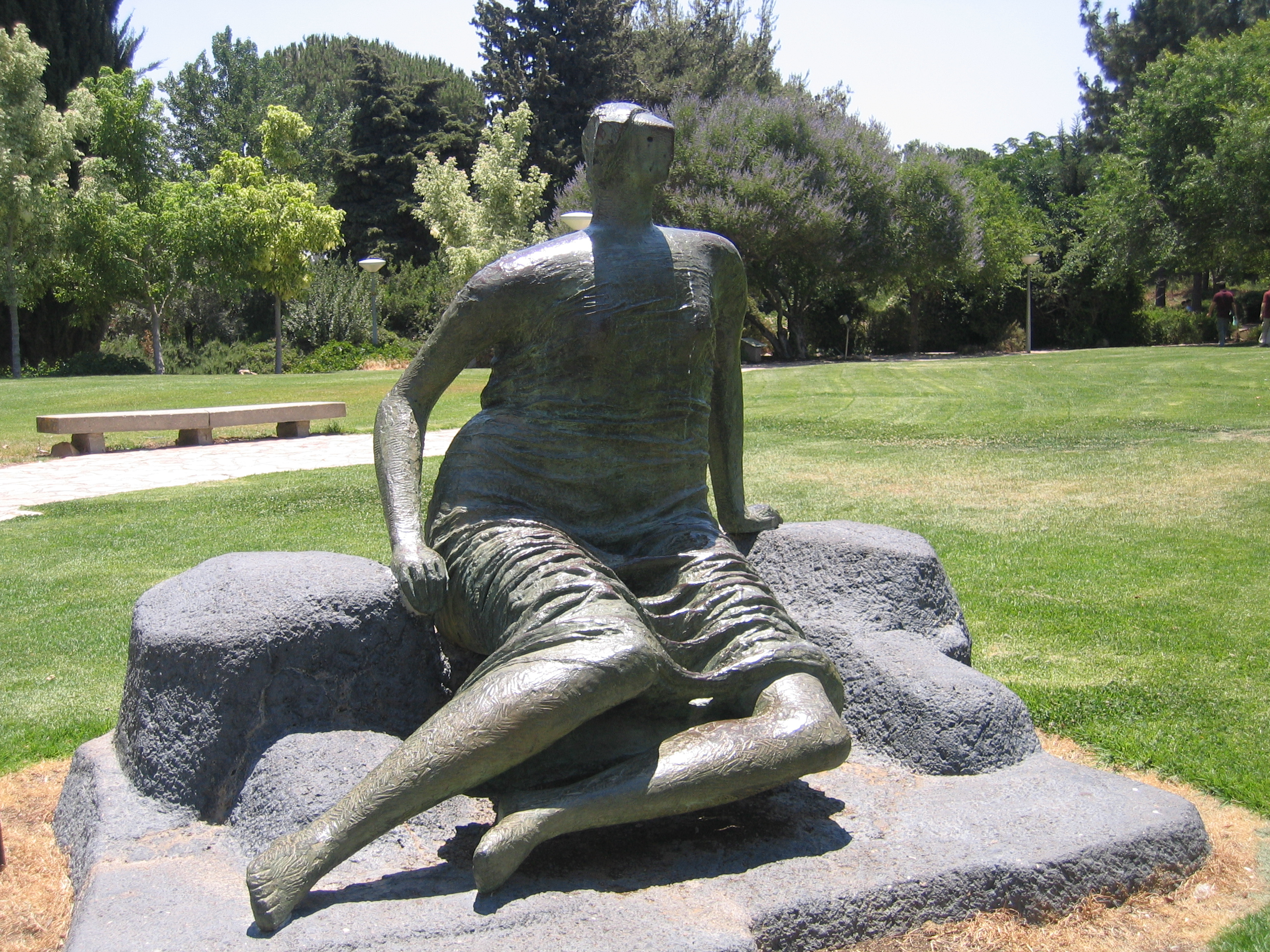
Cast 6 in Jerusalem

Moore's sculpture depicts a female figure in a seated position. It measures approximately 2 metres (6 ft 7 in) long, 2.5 metres (8 ft 2 in) tall, and weighs approximately 1.6 tonnes (1.8 tons). It is usually displayed mounted on a flat seat with raised arms to either side.

The sculpture was originally made in plaster, and cast in bronze in an edition of seven; the plaster is now owned by the Art Gallery of Ontario, and the bronze casts are owned by institutions across the world.

- Cast 0: on loan to the Tate Gallery
- Cast 1: on display at the Skulpturenpark Waldfrieden, Wuppertal
- Cast 2: London Borough of Tower Hamlets, UK. On display in Cabot Square, Canary Wharf from 2017.
- Cast 3: Royal Museum of Fine Arts of Belgium, Brussels
- Cast 4: Yale University Art Gallery in New Haven, Connecticut
- Cast 5: National Gallery of Victoria in Melbourne, Australia
- Cast 6: Hebrew University of Jerusalem in Givat Ram, Jerusalem

== Cast 1 (Wuppertal) ==
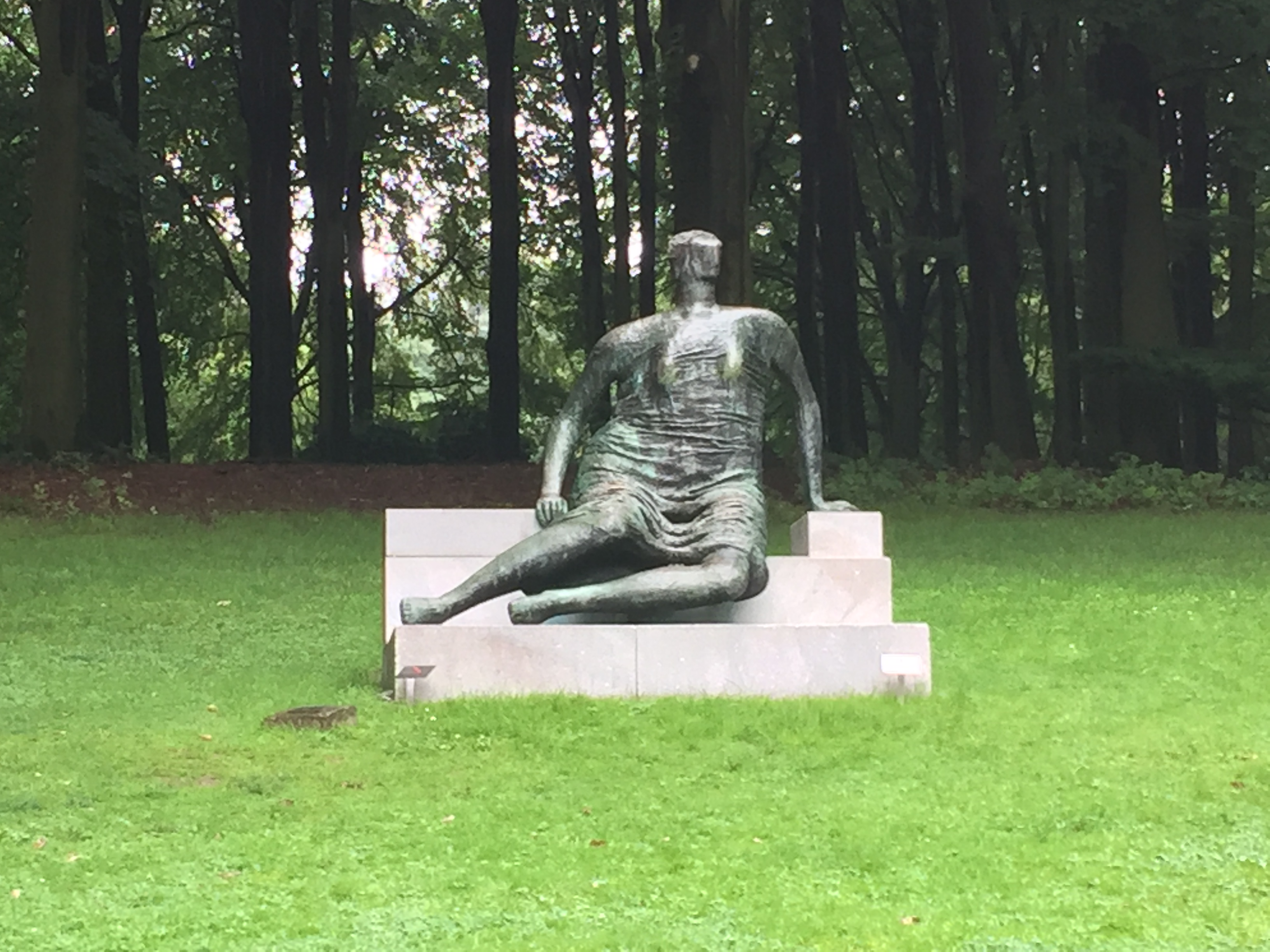
Cast 1 (Die Sitzende) on display at Waldfrieden Sculpture Park in Wuppertal

The German cast (known as Die Sitzende) was bought for a new swimming pool in Wuppertal, the Wuppertaler Schwimmoper. It generated very negative reactions from the German public when it went on display. Overnight on 5–6 December 1958, the cast was tarred and feathered, and an anonymous letter was left suggesting that the metal would be better used to make 100 frying pans. The derision continued, and the city authorities eventually donated the sculpture to the Von der Heydt Museum in 1963, and it was moved in September 1966. It went into storage in 1997 while the building was renovated, and returned to the swimming pool in 2010.

In 2017 it was given a permanent home in Waldfrieden Sculpture Park, a park founded by British sculptor Tony Cragg in Wuppertal.

== Cast 2 (Tower Hamlets) ==
=== Background to purchase ===
One of the casts was acquired by the London County Council in 1962 as part of its Patronage of the Arts Scheme. This scheme was operated by the London County Council, and subsequently the Greater London Council between 1956-65, pursuant to which approximately 70 works of art were purchased, including a cast of Draped Seated Woman. Many new housing estates and schools were then being built, as part of the regeneration following World War II. Sir Alan Bowness (Director of the Tate Gallery from 1980–88) was a member of the Advisory Committee and knew the leader of the LCC, Sir Isaac Hayward, who encouraged the siting of such works in new housing estates, schools and parks, so they could be enjoyed by Londoners.

In October 1959, the General Purposes Committee of the London County Council approved a programme for the acquisition and commissioning of works of art, in the financial year 1959/60, and had allocated £20,000 for that purpose. Provision had previously been made for expenditure of £1,500 for a sculpture (The Lesson by Franta Belsky) for the Avebury Estate, Bethnal Green, and £3,500 for a work of art at the Alton Road Estate, Roehampton (The Watchers by Lynn Chadwick). The Housing Committee had decided not to pursue these proposals and instead noted that the committee should consider providing work at the Stifford Estate, (Clive Street), Stepney (where Draped Seated Woman was subsequently sited) and the Alton Road Estate. The proposed fee for a work of art for the Clive Street Estate was £2,000, out of the annual budget of £20,000. During 1960, the London County Council made provision for the purchase of a work of art to be sited on the Stifford Estate, a new housing estate in the process of being constructed. Construction was completed in 1961 and tenants moved in during 1962.

A memo on 27 July 1961 from the Advisory Body relating to the Patronage of the Arts notes: "Stifford Estate, Stepney (1959–60 programme) Provision has been made for a sculpture at a cost of £2,200. The Advisory Body are of the opinion that the site is of such prominence and importance that a work of major importance should be provided…The last remaining copy of "Seated Draped Woman" by Henry Moore is available and the Advisory Body strongly recommend that it should be acquired for this estate. None of the other copies of the work is in London. The cost would be £7,000...".

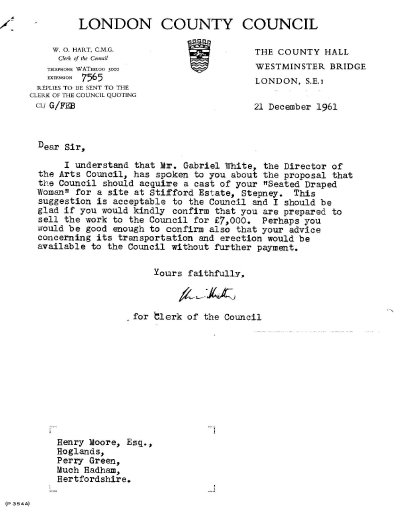
Letter from the LCC to Henry Moore confirming the purchase

The minutes of the General Purposes (Special Development and Arts) Sub-Committee dated 9 October 1961 passed a resolution that "subject to the approval of the Housing Committee the programmes of patronage of the arts for the years indicated are as follows:- (i) 1959–60 – Stifford Estate, Stepney – By the acquisition of a cast of "Draped Seated Woman" by Henry Moore, at a cost not exceeding £7,000...(instead of a sculpture at a cost of £2,200)". The minutes of the Advisory Body's meeting dated 22 February 1962 note that in relation to the Stifford Estate "Henry Moore has agreed to sell a cast of his Draped Seated Women for a site on this estate, following the decision of the LCC General Purposes Committee to allocate £7,000 for this purpose".

=== Purchase and siting of the cast ===
Draped Seated Woman was installed on the Stifford Estate on 1 July 1962. Nicknamed "Old Flo" it remained until the demolition of the estate and in 1997 was loaned by Tower Hamlets to the Yorkshire Sculpture Park, where it remained until 2017. In 2012, Tower Hamlets made a decision to sell the sculpture which led to a public campaign to prevent the sale and a subsequent legal challenge over title.

=== Council decision to sell ===
In October 2012, Tower Hamlets' cabinet (led by Lutfur Rahman) decided to sell the sculpture. This followed a resolution in September 2010 where the council asked its officers to explore options and costs for relocating the sculpture in Tower Hamlets. The findings were presented to the cabinet on 3 October 2012 who concluded they would seek to sell the sculpture and consign it to Christie's for sale at public auction. Tower Hamlets took no steps to identify any other parties who may have had a claim to title or to confirm title before this decision was made.

The decision was then called-in pursuant to the Council's Constitution. The call-in requisition cited the following reasons:

1. "The Council has had several years to investigate options for the statue and report on them. It has not done so.
2. The report [the First Report] refers in options [sic] for return, just Canary Wharf and Victoria Park. But gives no details of any negotiations with Canary Wharf or examines any other options within the Borough.
3. The report is therefore lacking in information in which to consider the sale of such an asset".

The decision was discussed by the Council's Overview and Scrutiny Committee on 6 November 2012. The meeting was attended by a representative of the Museum of London, who presented the museum's proposal to house the sculpture at its secure site at no cost to the council. The committee unanimously referred the decision back to the cabinet for consideration, proposing alternative actions. These included that:

Insufficient consideration has been given to alternative options for returning the sculpture to the borough for public view and the decision seems to have been rushed. The alternative options should now be fully considered. In particular the offer from the Museum of London Docklands to host and insure the sculpture should be explored as well as the other expressions of interest and offers of support. These offers illustrate that it is possible to return the sculpture to public view in the borough securely.

At the cabinet meeting the following day, 7 November, the committee's findings were acknowledged, but the decision to sell the sculpture was reaffirmed.

=== Campaign against sale ===
Several organisations were involved in the campaign to prevent the sale of Draped Seated Woman including the Art Fund and Museum of London and in 2012 researchers from the Museum of London, discovered that the sculpture was never transferred legally to Tower Hamlets and that the likely owner of the sculpture was actually the London Borough of Bromley, in its capacity as successor to the London Residuary Body. When challenged, Tower Hamlets was unable to provide any evidence that the sculpture was ever transferred to it on the abolition of the GLC and the case went to the High Court for a determination on title.

=== High Court case ===
It was argued by the respondent in 2015 that the route to title for the London Borough of Bromley was as follows:

1. Under the Local Government Act 1963, the London County Council was abolished and replaced by the Greater London Council with effect from 1 April 1965. Pursuant to the Local Government Act 1963, Stepney (in which the Stifford Estate was located) was incorporated into the then newly created London Borough of Tower Hamlets.
2. By virtue of the London Authorities (Property etc.) Order 1964, all property of the London County Council which was not expressly transferred by Order of the Secretary of State would be transferred to and retained by the Greater London Council. Title to the sculpture therefore transferred to the Greater London Council.
3. On 1 July 1985, under the Greater London Council Order 1981 and (Amendment) Order 1985, the land and housing accommodation on the Stifford Estate together with other related buildings (such as...estate amenities) was transferred to Tower Hamlets. The Sculpture was not listed anywhere or identified in the "Revised Property Schedule and Consolidated Administrative List of Property Transferred" even though the schedule specifically identified all parking spaces, sheds and transformers on the site which were to be subject to the transfer. It also made it clear that amenity land, greens and shrub beds whilst not listed were included. There were detailed plans showing the Stifford Estate and the other estate amenities transferred. The Sculpture was not identified in the plans or listed in the schedule and as such it did not transfer to Tower Hamlets under this transfer order.
4. Under the Local Government Act 1985 the GLC was dissolved. All assets of the GLC not otherwise specifically transferred vested in the London Residuary Body, by virtue of the Local Government Act 1985. This transfer included Draped Seated Woman as it had not been transferred to Tower Hamlets by any other means.
5. In 1996 the London Residuary Body was wound up. At that point all assets not otherwise assigned passed to the London Borough of Bromley in its capacity as successor to the London Residuary Body, pursuant to that order. At this point the sculpture became the property of the London Borough of Bromley.

Tower Hamlets disagreed with and asserted that either:

1. the sculpture fell within the definition of property held in connection with housing accommodation pursuant to the Local Government Act 1963 and had therefore transferred to them by virtue of this. Or
2. In the alternative the sculpture was a fixture and had therefore transferred to them with the land on which it stood. Or
3. In the alternative it was an estate amenity and therefore transferred with the Stifford Estate.
4. that the council had committed an act of conversion by lending the sculpture to the Yorkshire Sculpture Park in 1997 and that Bromley's title to the sculpture was therefore extinguished under the Limitation Act 1980.

In July 2015, Mr Justice Norris, sitting in the Chancery Division of the High Court, ruled that the route to title argued by the London Borough of Bromley was correct and that the sculpture had not transferred legally to Tower Hamlets on the abolition of the GLC by any of the routes argued by Tower Hamlets. He ruled that the sculpture was not a fixture, was not an estate amenity and had not transferred with the land on which it stood.

However the Judge accepted the final argument from Tower Hamlets that it had committed the tort of conversion when it loaned the sculpture as this was an act inconsistent with Bromley's rights as owner. As more than six years had passed since the act of conversion the judge ruled that Bromley's title was therefore extinguished under limitation and as such legal title now sat with Tower Hamlets.

=== Return to Tower Hamlets ===
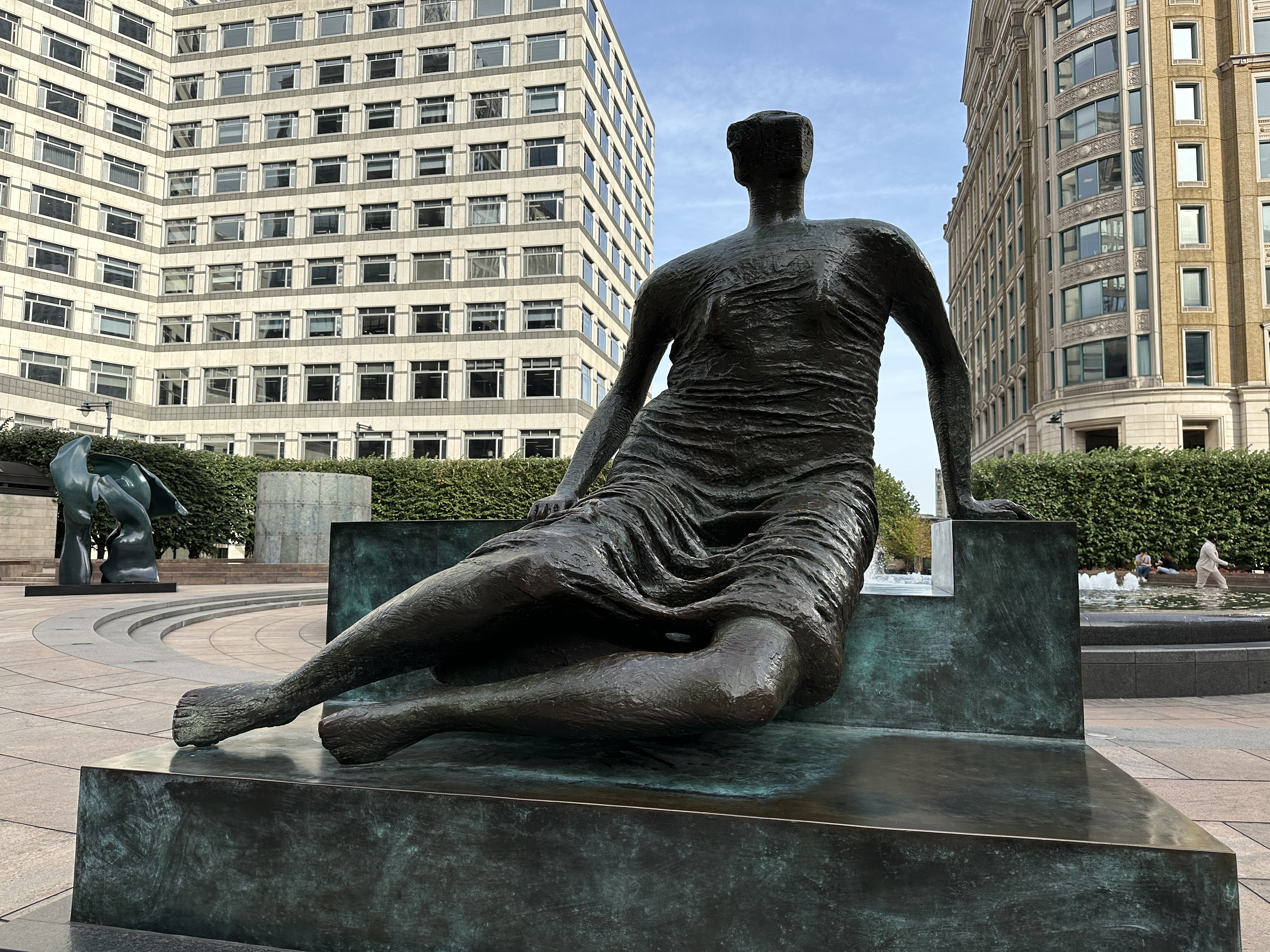
Cast 2 in Cabot Square, Canary Wharf, in 2023

In parallel with the high court case a challenge was lodged against the election of Rahman as Mayor of Tower Hamlets and his election was declared null and void by the Election Court. With removal of Rahman there was another election for Mayor won by the Labour's John Biggs, who made a commitment to cancel the sale and investigate how the sculpture could be displayed in Tower Hamlets.

In 2017, the statue was returned to East London by the council, and displayed on private land at Cabot Square in the Canary Wharf development.

== See also ==
- List of sculptures by Henry Moore
