= OIM =

OIM may refer to:

- Office for the Internal Market, UK internal trade body
- OIM (offshore installation manager), an oil-rig worker
- OIM, IATA code for Oshima Airport, in the island of Izu Ōshima, Tokyo, Japan
- Tõnu Õim, correspondence chess player
- Online Identity Management
- Oracle Identity Management, an identity-management infrastructure for products from Oracle Corporation
- Organisation internationale pour les migrations, the French name of International Organization for Migration
- Orientation imaging microscopy
