= Draped Reclining Woman 1957–58 =

Sculpture series by Henry Moore

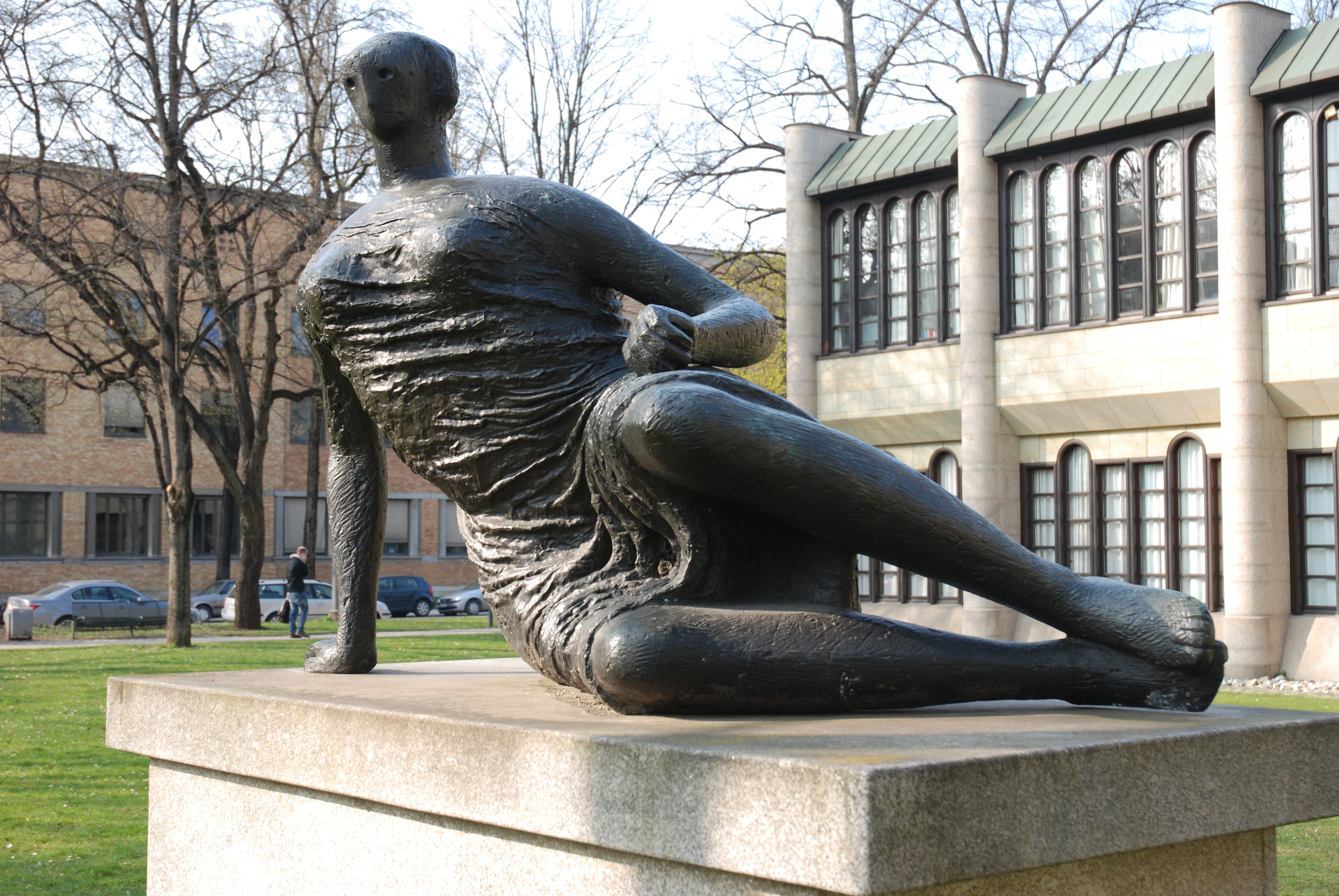
- At the Skulpturenpark Pinakotheken in Munich
- Artist: Henry Moore
- Year: 1957-1958
- Catalogue: LH 431
- Medium: Bronze
- Dimensions: 185 cm (73 in)

Draped Reclining Woman 1957–58 (LH 431) is a bronze sculpture by British artist Henry Moore, with a series of six castings (plus an artists cast, 0/6) made by Hermann Noack in Berlin.

The sculpture depicts a female figure in a reclining position on its right side, with its weight supported on its right hand and right leg. The left hand rests on the left thigh, with the left knee slightly raised but feet together. The drapery emphasises the female figure, but the facial features are abstracted and barely picked out, with two holes for eyes.

== Background ==
Henry Moore was a war artist in World War II. He made a series drawings of people sheltering from The Blitz in the London Underground, usually swathed in thick clothes. These drawings sparked an interest in drapery which was renewed by the classical sculptures that Moore saw during a 1951 trip to Greece. He was attracted by the ability of the drapery to draw attention to some parts of the human form by lying tightly on the shoulders, thighs or breasts while concealing other parts where the wrapping falls slack, and also by the varied textures created by small and large folds in the material.

Moore made a series of sculptures of draped human forms in the 1950s after he was commissioned to create a sculpture for the new UNESCO Headquarters building in Paris. He wanted to create a figure in an architectural context, and turned to the seated human form. His Draped Reclining Figure, 1952–53 was a precursor to these later draped figures. He completed the first major work in the series in 1955, with a maquette, Draped Seated Woman: Figure on Steps (LH 427), cast in a series of 10. This became the working model for the full–size sculpture that became his Draped Seated Woman 1957–58. The reclining figure is a dominant theme of Moore's work, with perhaps half of his sculptures in a reclining position. He made a similar work in a reclining position, Draped Reclining Woman 1957–58. Moore ultimately abandoned these ideas for the UNESCO commission, and his UNESCO Reclining Figure 1957-58 (LH 416) is a much more abstract reclining form in travertine.

== Sculpture ==
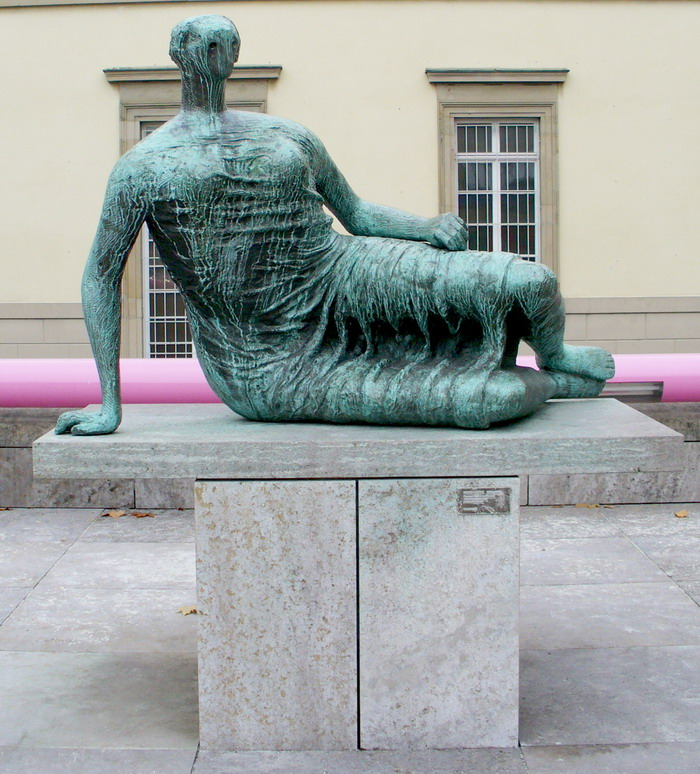
Stuttgart

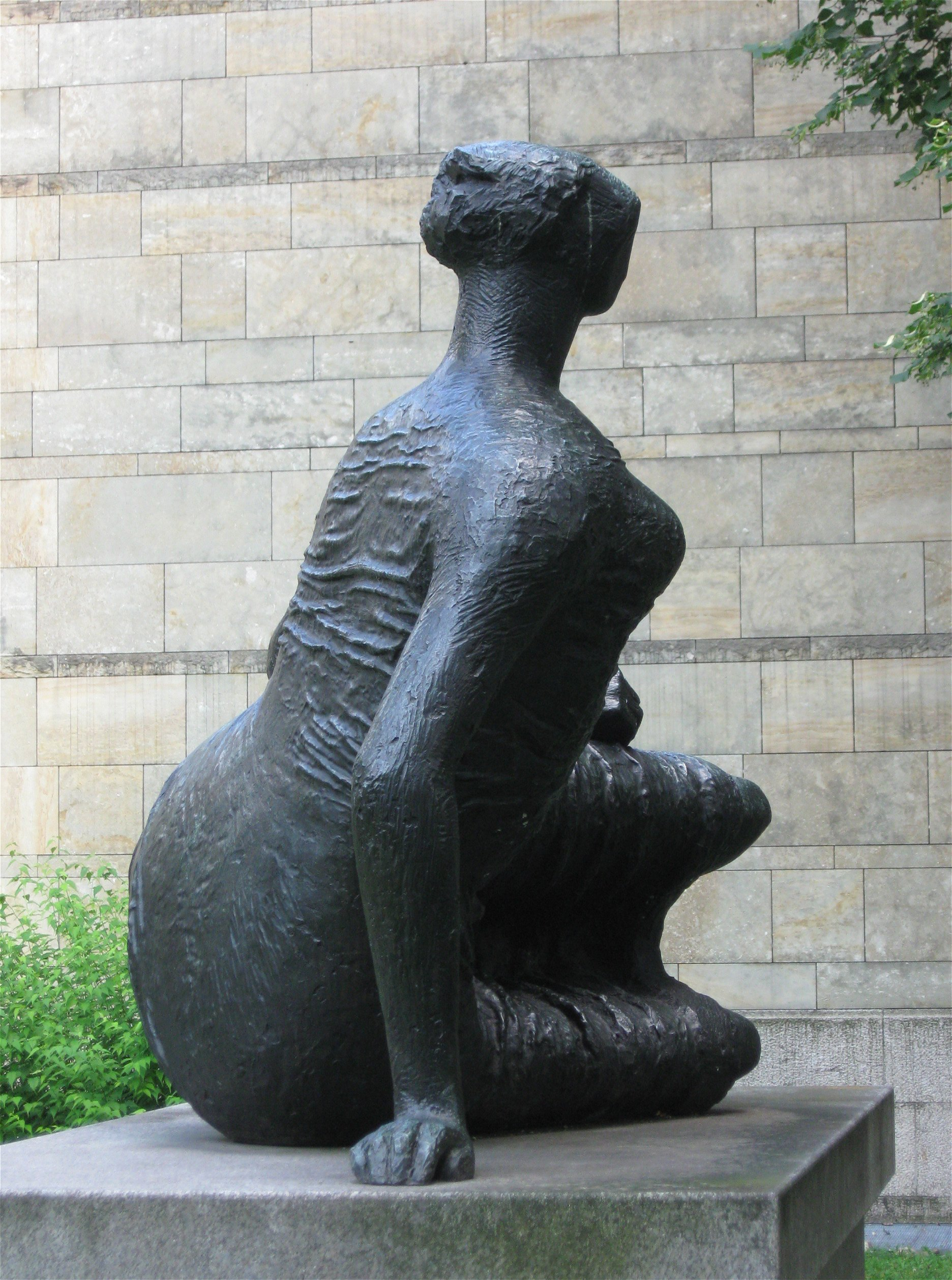
Munich

Moore's sculpture depicts a female figure in a reclining position. It measures approximately 2 metres (6 ft 7 in) long. It is usually displayed mounted on a flat bronze or stone base.

Seven casts of the completed sculpture were made for sale, numbers 1 to 6, plus an artist's cast (0/6). They are currently displayed in the UK, Germany and the US:

- the Tate Gallery in London (displayed at Glyndebourne) (2/6)
- the Sainsbury Centre for Visual Arts at University of East Anglia in Norwich (formerly at Sir Robert Sainsbury's house in Bucklebury)
- the Pinakothek der Moderne at the Bayerische Staatsgemäldesammlungen in Munich
- the Staatsgalerie in Stuttgart
- the Norton Simon Museum of Art in Pasadena (0/6)
- a private collection.

The only cast to remain in private hands (5/6) was sold at Christie's in London in June 2008 for nearly £4.3m, from the estate of J. Irwin Miller and his wife Xenia Simons Miller, formerly displayed at the Miller House and Garden in Columbus, Indiana.

The German copies are known as Die Liegende (The Recliner) or Die Grosse Liegende (The Large Recliner).

The original plaster model was given to the Henry Moore Sculpture Center at the Art Gallery of Ontario in Toronto in 1974.

== See also ==
- List of sculptures by Henry Moore
