= Sarah Cardell =

British lawyer and CEO

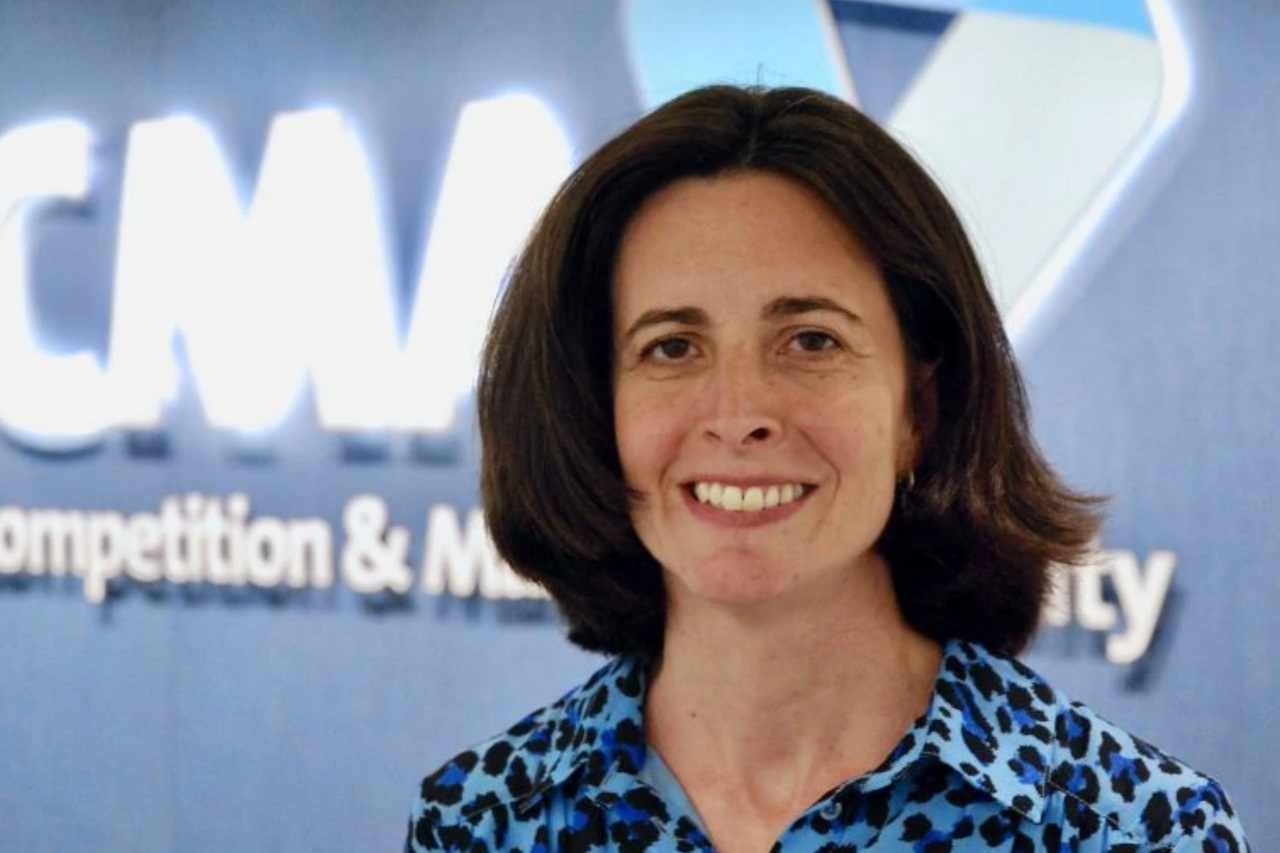
Sarah Cardell

Sarah Francesca Louise Cardell (born 7 November 1973) is the chief executive of Britain's Competition and Markets Authority (CMA).

== Early life and education ==
Cardell was born on 7 November 1973. She was educated at James Allen's Girls' School in London. She studied philosophy, politics and economics at Exeter College, University of Oxford.

== Career ==
Cardell worked at the legal firm Slaughter and May where she was made a partner in her early 30s.

She was legal partner of the Markets Division at Ofgem.

Cardell was appointed chief executive of the Competition and Markets Authority by Kwasi Kwarteng in June 2022, taking over from former CEO Andrea Coscelli. She had previously been general counsel at the CMA since September 2013. In December 2022, she gave the keynote speech at the British Institute of International and Comparative Law (BIICL) roundtable, on the subject of competition in digital markets.

She was the chair of the board of the Antitrust Writing Awards in 2023.

== Personal life ==
Cardell is married and has three daughters.
