= Jenny Lau =

British writer and community organiser

- Born: Jenny Lau; March 1985 (age 41); Sidcup, Greater London, England
- Education: Girton College, Cambridge
- Website: www.celestialpeach.com

Jenny Lau (born March 1985) is a British food writer and community organiser. Her debut essay collection An A-Z of Chinese Food (Recipes Not Included) was published in 2025.

== Early life ==
Lau was born on the outskirts of South East London to a Hong Kong father and a Malaysian-Chinese mother. She spent her early childhood in Hong Kong before returning to London with her mother in 1996 at age 11. Lau recalls becoming estranged from the Cantonese food of her youth until re-discovering it as an adult.

Lau attended James Allen's Girls' School in Dulwich. She was a pianist and violinist from a young age. She graduated with a degree in Music from Girton College, Cambridge.

== Career ==
Lau began her career performing in London's indie music scene, performing with The Mules and Emmy the Great before going into PR and marketing, starting in social media before moving towards fashion communications. In 2014, she worked for Acne Studios in Stockholm.

In 2018, Lau founded the online platform Celestial Peach, which she primarily used a food blog and to connect with others before branching out towards essays, art and fundraising. She started hosting a potluck and supper club at the Hackney Chinese Community Services Association (now the ESEA Community Centre) in 2019. Cultural events and projects she developed included the interview series #ChineseFoodiesOfIG, the charity Asian Dessert Exchange during the COVID-19 pandemic, and CongeeCon. Lau collaborated with photographer Kenneth Lam on a 2020 photography series titled #HumansOfChinatownLondon. In 2020, Lau appeared on the BBC Good Food list of "game-changers" in the food scene.

Based on her interview series called #ChineseFoodiesOfIG, Lau organised a digital exhibition in January 2022 titled What Does Home Taste Like?, which sought illustrations from over 40 artists. In 2023, Lau started writing a column for the South China Morning Post. She also contributed an essay to Jonathan Nunn's London Feeds Itself. Lau was finalist for a BIH Hospitality Award and nominated for CODE Hospitality's 2024 Woman of the Year in the Leader category.

Renegade Books (a Dialogue Books imprint, part of Hachette UK) won a three-auction to publish Lau's debut non-fiction book An A-Z of Chinese Food (Recipes Not Included) in January 2025. Neither a recipe cookbook nor a glossary, the book contains a collection of 26 essays Lau started writing in 2021 on Chinese food, identity, culture, history and misconceptions, particularly as these topics pertain to the diaspora. Violet Conroy of AnOther Magazine called it "wholly unique for its brazen originality, humour and range". An A-Z of Chinese Food was a Service95 Book Club pick.

== Personal life ==
Lau has lived in Whitechapel, Haggerston and New Cross.

== Bibliography ==
=== Books ===
- An A-Z of Chinese Food (Recipes Not Included) (2025)

=== Essays ===
- "The Community Centre" in London Feeds Itself (2023), edited by Jonathan Nunn
