= Competition and Markets Authority =

UK government non-ministerial department

- Cystadleuaeth a Marchnadoedd Awdurdod (Welsh)

Authority overview
- Formed: 1 October 2013
- Type: Non-ministerial government department
- Jurisdiction: United Kingdom
- Headquarters: 25 Cabot Square, London
- Employees: 1,104; 1,071 FTEs (2024)
- Authority executives: Doug Gurr (chairperson); Sarah Cardell (CEO)
- Parent department: Department for Business and Trade
- Child Authority: Office for the Internal Market
- Website: gov.uk/cma

The Competition and Markets Authority (CMA) is the principal competition regulator in the United Kingdom. It is a non-ministerial government department in the United Kingdom, responsible for promoting competitive markets and tackling unfair behaviour. The CMA launched in shadow form on 1 October 2013 and began operating fully on 1 April 2014, when it assumed many of the functions of the previously existing Competition Commission and Office of Fair Trading, which were abolished. The CMA also has consumer protection responsibilities and took on new digital markets regulation responsibilities in late 2024 under the Digital Markets, Competition and Consumers Act 2024.

The CMA alongside the Directorate-General for Competition, the United States Department of Justice and the Federal Trade Commission, is an antitrust agency.

== History ==
On 15 March 2012, the UK Government's Department for Business, Innovation and Skills (BIS) announced proposals for strengthening competition in the UK by merging the Office of Fair Trading and the Competition Commission to create a new single Competition and Markets Authority (CMA). The formation of the CMA was enacted in Part 3 of the Enterprise and Regulatory Reform Act 2013, which received royal assent on 25 April 2013.

In July 2012, Lord Currie was appointed chairman designate of the CMA, and in January 2013, Alex Chisholm was appointed chief executive designate.

On 15 July 2013, BIS announced the first stage of an open public consultation period and published a summary setting out the background to the consultation and inviting views on the draft guidance for the CMA. The first stage of the consultation ended on 6 September 2013. On 17 September, BIS announced the second consultation stage, which closed on 7 November 2013.

During 2013 and 2014, the CMA announced several waves of appointments at the director level, reporting to members of the senior executive team.

Following a consultation, the CMA published the Rules of Procedure for CMA merger, market, and special reference groups on 28 March 2014.

On 12 August 2019, the CMA's London office moved to 25 Cabot Square in the Canary Wharf business estate.

In 2021, the CMA announced that it would establish branch offices in Manchester and Darlington. The Manchester office would house the Digital Markets Unit, charged with "oversee[ing] a new regulatory regime for the most powerful digital firms", forming a 'Digital Hub' with the Digital Regulation Co-operation Forum. The Darlington office, part of the UK Government's Darlington Economic Campus, would be home to the Microeconomics Unit, in charge of the economic research and evaluation functions of the CMA, including production of the State of Competition report. The Microeconomics Unit is intended to complement the Bank of England's role in macroeconomics, and in July 2023 announced a research and skills-development partnership with the Durham Research in Economic Analysis and Mechanisms centre at Durham University.

On 21 January 2025, Marcus Bokkerink resigned from the post of chair of the CMA, after disagreements with government ministers on how to drive growth, prosperity and opportunity for the UK. Bokkerink advocated an approach that focused on empowering consumers to make choices, fostering competition, creating a level playing field for challengers as well as incumbents, and creating the conditions for the resulting innovation, productivity growth and investment to diffuse across the economy, safeguarded by an independent competition and consumer protection authority. He was replaced by former Amazon UK boss, Doug Gurr, on an interim basis, and in April 2026 permanently.

On 31 July 2025, the CMA published its final decision in the cloud infrastructure services market investigation, concluding that competition is "not working well" and recommending further action, including potential use of new Digital Markets powers.

== Responsibilities ==
In situations where competition could be unfair or consumer choice may be affected, the CMA is responsible for:

- investigating phase 1 and phase 2 mergers
- conducting market studies and market investigations
- investigating possible breaches of prohibitions against anti-competitive agreements under the Competition Act 1998
- bringing criminal proceedings against individuals who commit cartel offences
- enforcing consumer protection legislation, particularly the Unfair Terms in Consumer Contract Directive and Regulations
- encouraging regulators to use their competition powers
- considering regulatory references and appeals
- conducting investigations into and designating companies as having Strategic Market Status under chapter 2 of the Digital Markets Competition and Consumers Act 2024
- imposing conduct requirements and pro-competition interventions on companies designated as having Strategic Market Status, under chapters 3 and 4 of the Digital Markets Competition and Consumers Act 2024

== Notable cases ==
- Acquisition of Activision Blizzard by Microsoft: the authority initially ruled against the deal but, following an investigation, changed its position
- Giphy § Attempted acquisition by Meta Platforms: the authority found that there was a risk that Meta's Facebook could pull Giphy's services from competitors, or require them to provide more user data as a condition of service.
- MyFerryLink: the authority maintained that Eurotunnel, which leased the three MyFerryLink vessels to SeaFrance, could no longer operate ferry services from Dover, due to competition concerns. The ruling was appealed by Eurotunnel, allowing sailings operated by the company to continue as normal.
- Ticketmaster: an investigation was announced over concerns regarding the sale of concert tickets by Ticketmaster for the Oasis Live '25 Tour.
- Veterinary services: an initial review undertaken in September 2023 elicited 56,000 responses from pet owners, leading to a full investigation being commenced in June 2024.

== See also ==
- English contract law
- EU competition law
