= Sarah Corp =

British television producer (1975–2016)

Sarah Corp (24 April 1975 – 10 May 2016) was a British television producer who worked for ITN's Channel 4 News. She specialised in foreign affairs.

== Life and career ==
She was born in Blackheath, London, the youngest of three daughters to John, an oil trader, and Prue Corp, a modern languages teacher and concert organiser. Corp spent her early childhood in Egypt, where her father worked in the oil industry. She attended James Allen's Girls' School in Dulwich on a scholarship and was heavily involved in music, learning to sing and play three instruments: the cello, piano, and trumpet. Corp worked as a teacher in Nepal before earning a degree in history at Selwyn College, Cambridge. She continued to sing while in college and throughout her career in journalism.

In 1998, she began working at ITN as an assistant news editor and joined Channel 4 News the following year being posted to the Washington office as a producer. Corp was assigned to the ITN's coverage of the 2003 invasion of Iraq, and later reported on Iran's Green Revolution, the Libyan Civil War and the annexation of Crimea by the Russian Federation. She managed to gain permission for her colleague, presenter Jon Snow, to interview President Mahmoud Ahmadinejad of Iran in 2009.

Corp was diagnosed with lung cancer in 2014, although she had never smoked. Her last story was the 2014 Hong Kong protests, known as the "umbrella revolution". She died in May 2016, aged 41. Corp was married to Charles Bates from 2008 until her death.
