= 1 Cabot Square =

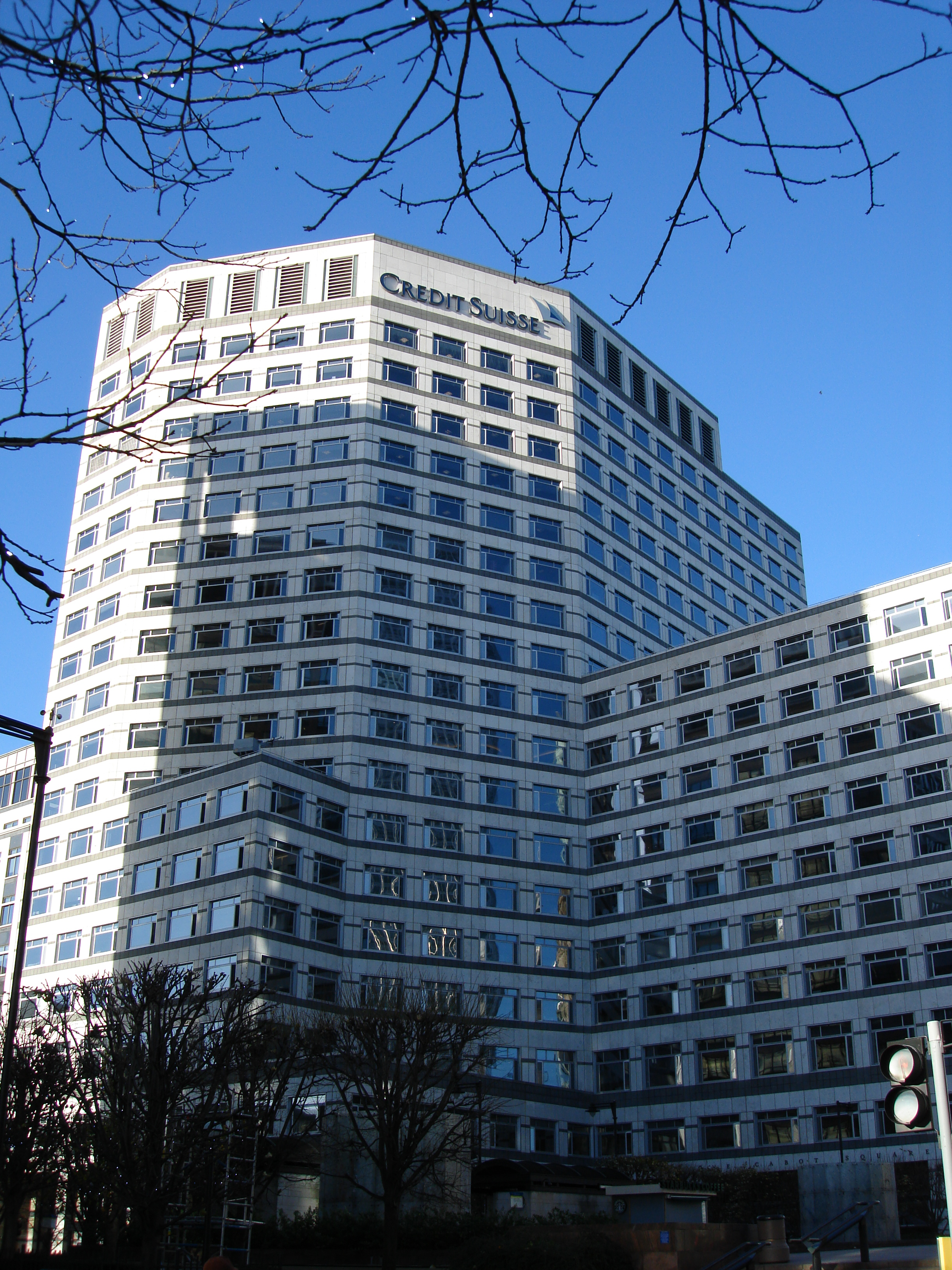
- 1 Cabot Square
- Interactive map of the 1 Cabot Square area

General information
- Status: Operational
- Type: Commercial
- Architectural style: Post-modern
- Location: Cabot Square, Canary Wharf, London, England
- Coordinates: 51°30′21″N 00°01′26″W
- Completed: 1991

Height
- Roof: 89 m (292 ft)

Technical details
- Floor count: 21
- Floor area: 50,166 m^{2} (539,980 sq ft)
- Lifts/elevators: 36

Design and construction
- Architect: Pei Cobb Freed & Partners

1 Cabot Square (also known as the Credit Suisse building), is a 21-floor office building in Cabot Square, Canary Wharf, London, England. From its completion in 1991 until 2023, the building's primary tenant was Credit Suisse.

== Project history ==
Original plans called for a skyscraper on this site for Credit Suisse First Boston.

== Architect ==
The architect on the project was Pei Cobb Freed & Partners, and the building was completed in 1991. The project had two management contractors Ellis Don and Sir Robert McAlpine.

== Architecture ==
It is 89 metres tall (292 feet), with a floorspace of 50,166 square metres (164,587 square feet).

The building has large, open plates on the floor, that range in size from 64,500 square feet to 24,000 square feet in the executive offices.

It is internally connected to the west, to 20 Columbus Courtyard, which is also connected to a full-height internal link to the north, 17 Columbus Courtyard.

The building was the second largest building located at Canary Wharf, behind the Canary Wharf Tower. The Credit Suisse building has 18 storeys with an additional two storeys of plant at the top. The building also has a two-storey arcade that is located at the base of the building. The building was renovated in 2019.

== Ownership ==
In early 2012 it was purchased by Qatar's sovereign wealth fund Qatar Investment Authority (QIA) Subsequently, QIA considered selling it multiple times before eventually selling to KB Securities of South Korea.

The building is leased to Credit Suisse for around 20 years and part of Canary Wharf, of which QIA bought a majority in a joint venture with Brookfield Properties in 2015.

== Gallery ==
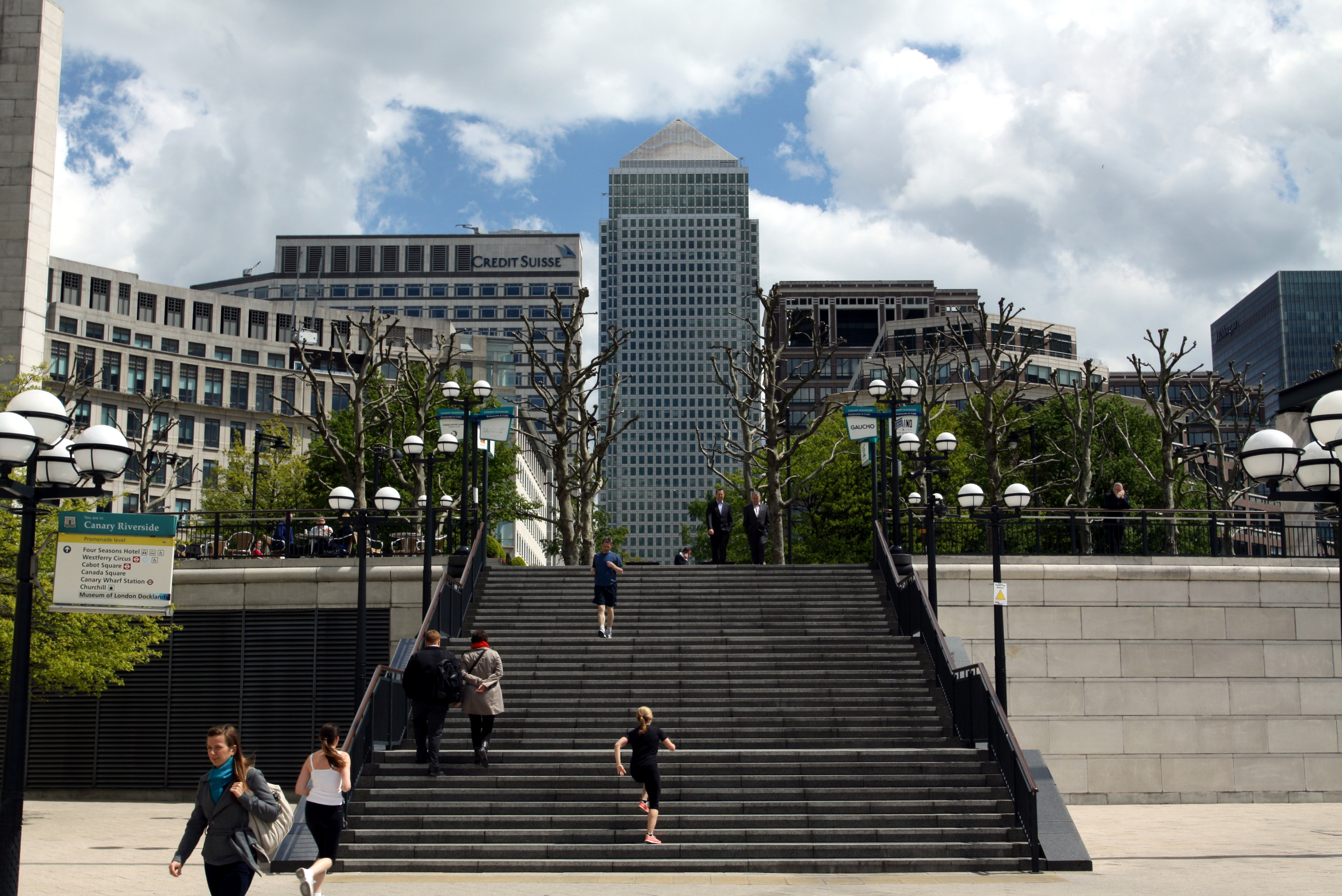
1 Cabot Square with One Canada Square from Westfery Circus

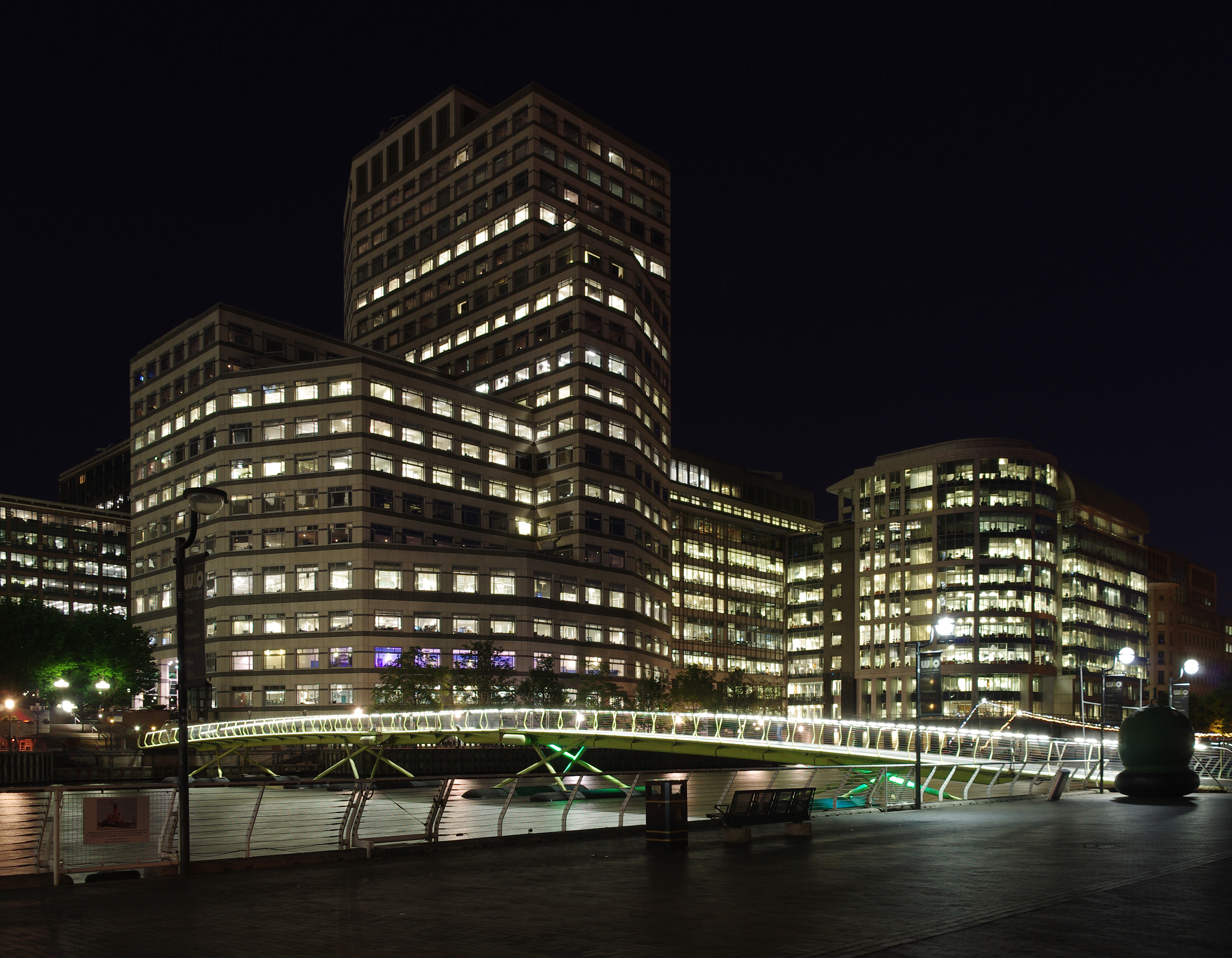
1 Cabot Square at night

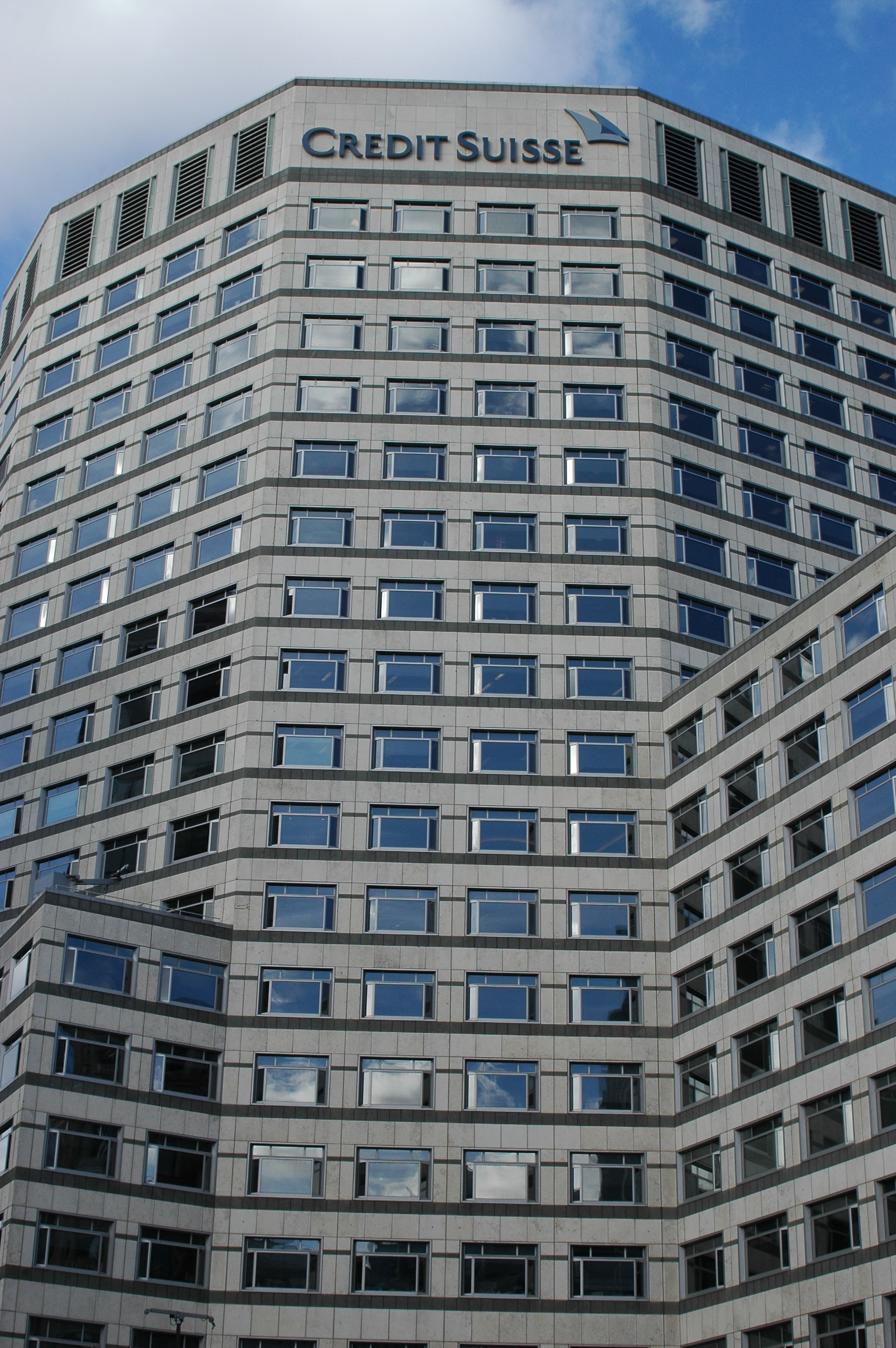
Detail of the building

== See also ==
- Canary Wharf
- Credit Suisse
