= Office for the Internal Market =

Office for the Internal Market (OIM)

Agency overview
- Formed: 21 September 2021
- Type: a part of a non-ministerial department
- Jurisdiction: United Kingdom
- Headquarters: The Cabot, 25 Cabot Square, London, E14 4QZ
- Agency executives: Adam Land, Senior Director; Murdoch MacLennan, OIM Panel Chair
- Parent agency: Competition and Markets Authority
- Key document: United Kingdom Internal Market Act 2020
- Website: Office for the Internal Market (gov.uk)

The Office for the Internal Market (OIM) is that part of the Competition and Markets Authority (a non-ministerial department) responsible for overseeing the UK internal market. Its objective is to monitor the UK internal market by reporting every year and at least every 5 years on the functioning of the internal market to the Parliament of the United Kingdom and devolved parliaments, and to conduct reviews and provide economic analysis of the impact of regulatory differences across the four nations of the UK.

Any of the four governments around the UK can submit a request from the OIM to examine a regulation, and businesses can bring any issues they might have regarding the UK internal market to the OIM through its webform.

== History ==
On 17 December 2020, the United Kingdom Internal Market Act 2020 received royal assent. Part 4 of the Act sets out arrangements for the creation the Office of the Internal Market within the Competition and Markets Authority.

On 22 March 2021, the Competition and Markets Authority appointed Rachel Merelie as the Senior Director for the OIM. On 21 September 2021, the Office for the Internal Market officially opened and began operating as the advisory body for the UK internal market.

== Office for the Internal Market panel ==
The Office for the Internal Market Panel is the governance body for the OIM. This panel consists of 8 members, including the panel chair.

On 11 April 2022 Business Secretary Kwasi Kwarteng appointed Murdoch MacLennan as the first chair of the panel.

On 20 December 2023, the rest of the Office for the Internal Market Panel was appointed:

- Professor Suzanne Rab
- Prof Andreas Stephan
- Angharad Butler
- Stephen Gifford
- Shane Lynch
- Michael Neilson
- Dr Timothy Render

== Reports ==
Name	Report Date	Citation
Overview of the UK Internal Market Report	22 March 2022	
OIM Annual Report on the Operation of the Internal_Market 2022-23	21 March 2023	
OIM Periodic Report 2023	21 March 2023	

== Requests to the OIM ==
On 8 August 2022 the UK Government asked the Office for the market to examine how a ban of peat in England would affect the UK internal market

== See also ==
- Devolution in the United Kingdom
- Northern Ireland Protocol
- Trade agreements of the United Kingdom
- United Kingdom common framework policies
