= Lola Adesioye =

British journalist

Lola Adesioye is an English writer, commentator, broadcaster and singer-songwriter born in London, England, to Nigerian parents.

== Biography ==
Adesioye attended Rosemead Preparatory School and James Allen's Girls' School, prestigious private schools in Dulwich, south-east London. She excelled academically and musically at both, becoming Head Girl at the former and a Music Scholar and Head Girl at James Allen's Girls' School. At James Allen's Girls' School, Adesioye participated in the European Youth Parliament and competed on the debating team.

Adesioye studied Modern and Medieval Languages (Italian and Spanish) at Robinson College, Cambridge, before changing to Social & Political Science. She earned a Bachelor of Arts degree and was later awarded an honorary master's degree by the university.

At Cambridge University, Adesioye was politically active within her college and the Cambridge University Students' Union, holding elected office for two years as Anti-Racism and Ethnic Minorities Officer respectively. She was involved in the creation of Cambridge University's Little Black Book, an award-winning book for students of colour that was used by the UK's Department for Education and Employment as part of its race relations initiative at the time.

In 2004, she appeared in a primetime BBC documentary series Black Ambition, which followed the lives of eight black Cambridge students in their final year.

== Media ==
Adesioye is an international writer whose commentary and analysis on UK, US and African society, politics and culture has been published in the New Statesman, The Guardian, The Economist, BBC, CNN, The Huffington Post, TIME magazine, The Washington Post′s TheRoot.com, Forbes Africa, The Atlantic, and EbonyJet. She regularly appears as a talking head on TV and radio, including CNN, MSNBC, the BBC, Channel 4 and BET.

Adesioye was one of the founding editors (Deputy Editor) of NBC's African-American news site TheGrio.com and was a Contributing Editor for AOL Blackvoices before it became Huffington Post Black.

In 2022, she covered and commentated on the death of Queen Elizabeth for MSNBC and has been sourced as an expert in British race relations as pertains to the Royal Family. In 2021, she was featured in "Cleo Speaks", a TV One series dedicated to the lives of dynamic black women which re-aired on Apple TV in 2023.

She has been described as one of "11 black commentators you should be following" and has been named one of Nigeria's top wordsmiths.

== Music ==
After Cambridge, Adesioye worked in the music industry at major record company Atlantic (formerly known as East West) Records and dance/urban label Ministry of Sound, before moving into project managing large-scale branded international music events. She was project manager of the team – alongside Live Aid and Live 8 producer Kevin Wall – behind multimillion-dollar award-winning global music show, Nokia New Year's Eve, for Nokia and MSN before going on to pursue a career in the media. She continues to perform as a singer-songwriter under the name Lola Vista.

== Assault accusation ==
Actor Gbenga Akinnagbe filed a criminal complaint alleging that journalist Adesioye grabbed his buttocks on two occasions in 2020. Adesioye was arrested on May 26, 2021, jailed for 28 hours, and charged with forcible touching, sexual abuse, and harassment. Her attorney described Akinnagbe's allegations as "a blatant, brazen lie". In October 2021, the case was dismissed.
