= Pamela Huby =

British philosopher (1922–2019)

- Born: 21 April 1922; Dulwich, London, England
- Died: 18 February 2019 (aged 96); Letchworth, England
- Spouse: Ronald Huby

Philosophical work
- Era: Contemporary philosophy
- Region: Western philosophy

Pamela Margaret Huby (21 April 1922 – 18 February 2019) was a British philosopher and emeritus reader in philosophy at the University of Liverpool.

Born in Dulwich, she was educated at James Allen's Girls' School and then won a senior scholarship in Classics to Lady Margaret Hall Oxford University. She was then an assistant lecturer in Classics at Reading and after a year returned to Oxford to lecture at St Anne's College where she switched to the field of ancient Greek philosophy, moving to Liverpool two years later.

== Books ==
- Greek Ethics (1967)
- Plato and Modern Morality (1972)
- Theophrastus of Eresus (1999)
