= Jenny Ackroyd =

- Born: 1950; Leeds, England
- Died: 5 September 2004 (aged 53–54)
- Education: New Hall, Cambridge
- Known for: Vascular surgery
- Scientific career
- Institutions: Middlesex Hospital; Princess Alexandra Hospital NHS Trust

Jenny S. Ackroyd Lennox (1950 – 2004) was a vascular surgeon at Princess Alexandra Hospital NHS Trust. She was the first woman to be appointed a registrar at St Thomas' Hospital. Ackroyd established the day surgery unit at the Princess Alexandra Hospital.

== Early life and education ==
Ackroyd was born in Leeds. She was the fourth of five children of Peter and Evelyn Ackroyd. Her father was an academic at King's College London. Ackroyd attended James Allen's Girls' School. She studied fine arts and medicine at the University of Cambridge, where she was a member of New Hall. Ackroyd completed her junior doctor training at the Middlesex Hospital, where she was the first woman surgical registrar. In 1986 Ackroyd earned a Master's in surgery at the University of Cambridge; and may have been the first woman to do so.

== Career ==
Ackroyd was a founder of the Royal College of Surgeons Women in Surgical Training programme. In 1987 Ackroyd was appointed as a Consultant Surgeon at the Princess Alexandra Hospital NHS Trust. She raised money to develop a day surgery unit at the hospital. The wing is home to a same-day admission facility, 82 beds and two operating theatres.

In 1992, Ackroyd lost her sight in one eye after developing a melanoma, but continued to work and became known as the "partially sighted, female surgeon from Wareside". She was invited by the Royal National Institute of Blind People to attend the 1993 Women of the Year Lunch.

Ackroyd was responsible for the building of a new surgical wing, which was opened by the health secretary in 2004. Ackroyd died on 5 September 2004. The Jenny Ackroyd Surgical Symposium is an annual celebration of Ackroyd's life. There is a tree planted in Ackroyd's memory at the Capio Rivers Hospital.

== Personal life ==
Ackroyd was married to the surgeon Malcolm Lennox. Together they had two children, Sophie and Sandy. Ackroyd was a member of St Mary's Church Choir.
