= Cabot Square =

Public space in Canary Wharf, England

Coordinates: 51°30′19″N 0°1′20″W

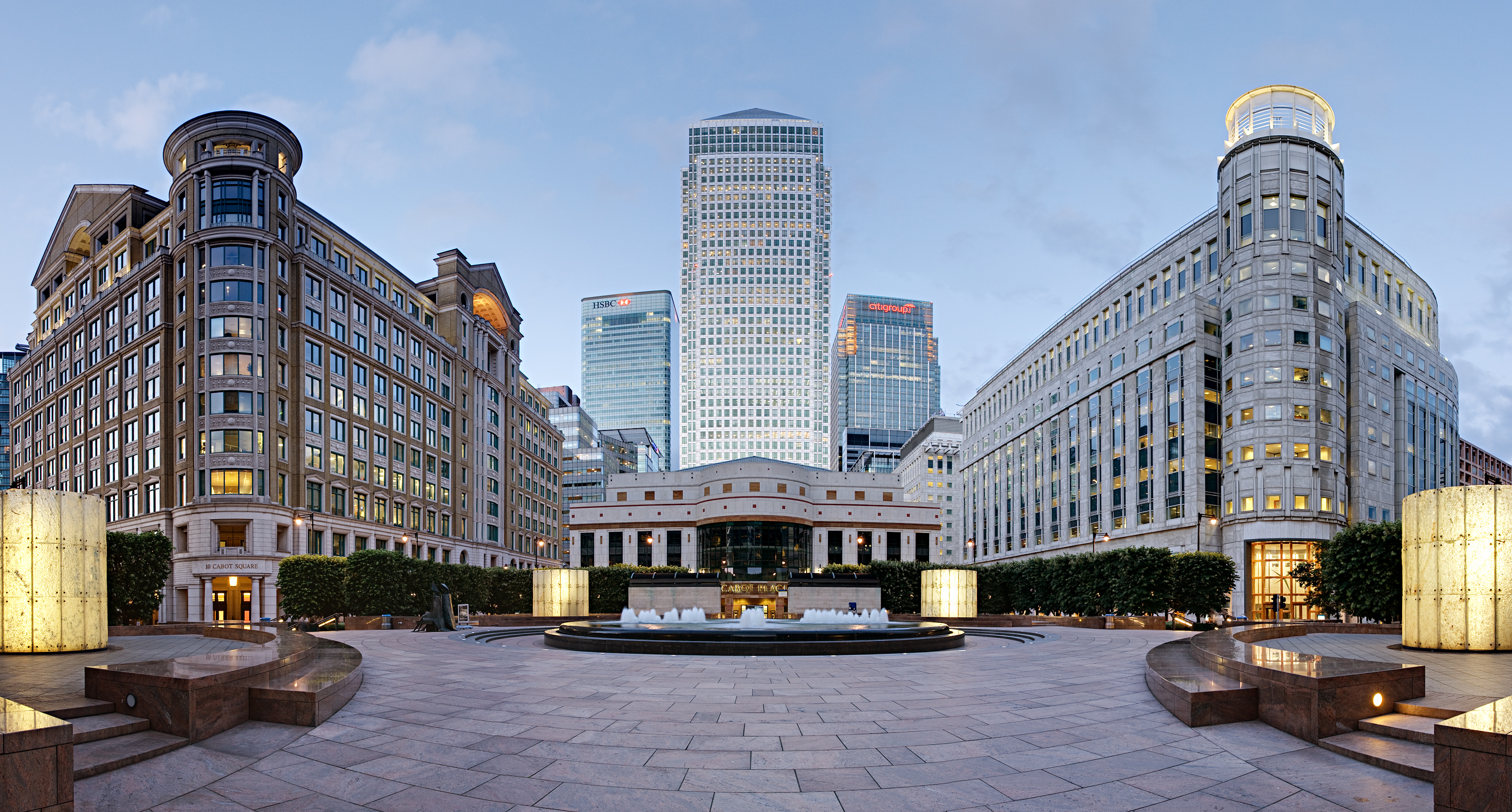
The three tallest skyscrapers in Canary Wharf as viewed from Cabot Square: 8 Canada Square (left), One Canada Square (centre), Citigroup Centre (right)

Cabot Square is one of the central squares of the Canary Wharf Development on the Isle of Dogs.

The square includes a fountain and several works of art including Cast 2 of Henry Moore's Draped Seated Woman 1957–58.

The London offices of Credit Suisse and Morgan Stanley are in Cabot Square.

In the northwest corner of the square is a small memorial stone to Michael von Clemm, an international banker of the 1960s, 70s and 80s, who had one of the original ideas for the development of docklands into a financial centre and who was Chairman of CSFB, a forerunner to Credit Suisse's Investment Banking division

On the east side of the square is Cabot Place, a large shopping centre designed by Pelli Clarke Pelli with Adamson Associates as executive architect. The square is also home to several restaurants, including First Edition, Sri Nam, and Corney and Barrow.

== Cabot Hall ==
Cabot Hall, on the east side of the square was a large banqueting and performance hall which opened in 1991 and is the venue for regular concerts and events. In 2006 Canary Wharf Group announced that Cabot Hall would close at the end of 2006 to be converted into additional retail and restaurants, and in 2011 the restaurant space was filled by Scottish restaurant Boisdale.

Cabot Square and Cabot Hall are named after Italian explorer John Cabot.

== In popular culture ==
The square features in the 2026 film Masters of the Universe alongside other Canary Wharf landmarks.

== See also ==
- 1 Cabot Square
- 25 Cabot Square
- Canary Wharf
