= Place de Fontenoy =

Square in Paris, France

Coordinates: 48°51′2″N 2°18′23″E

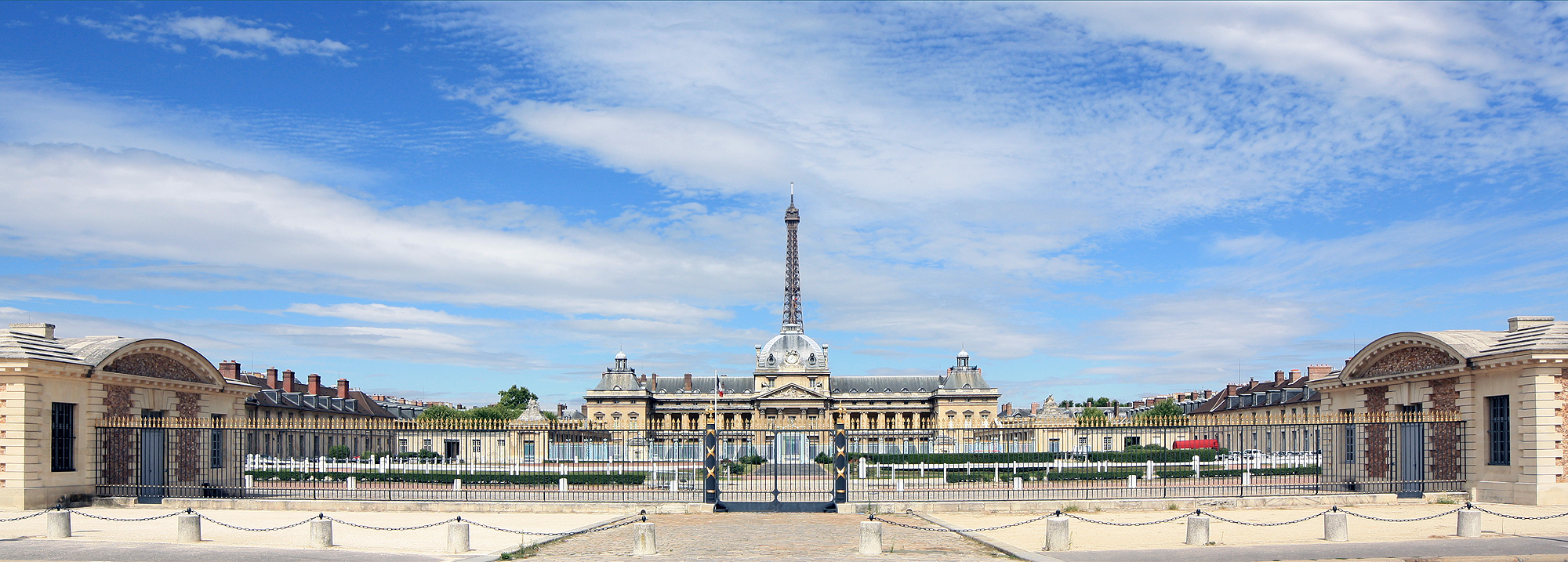
The Place de Fontenoy opening towards the École Militaire, with the Eiffel Tower in the background

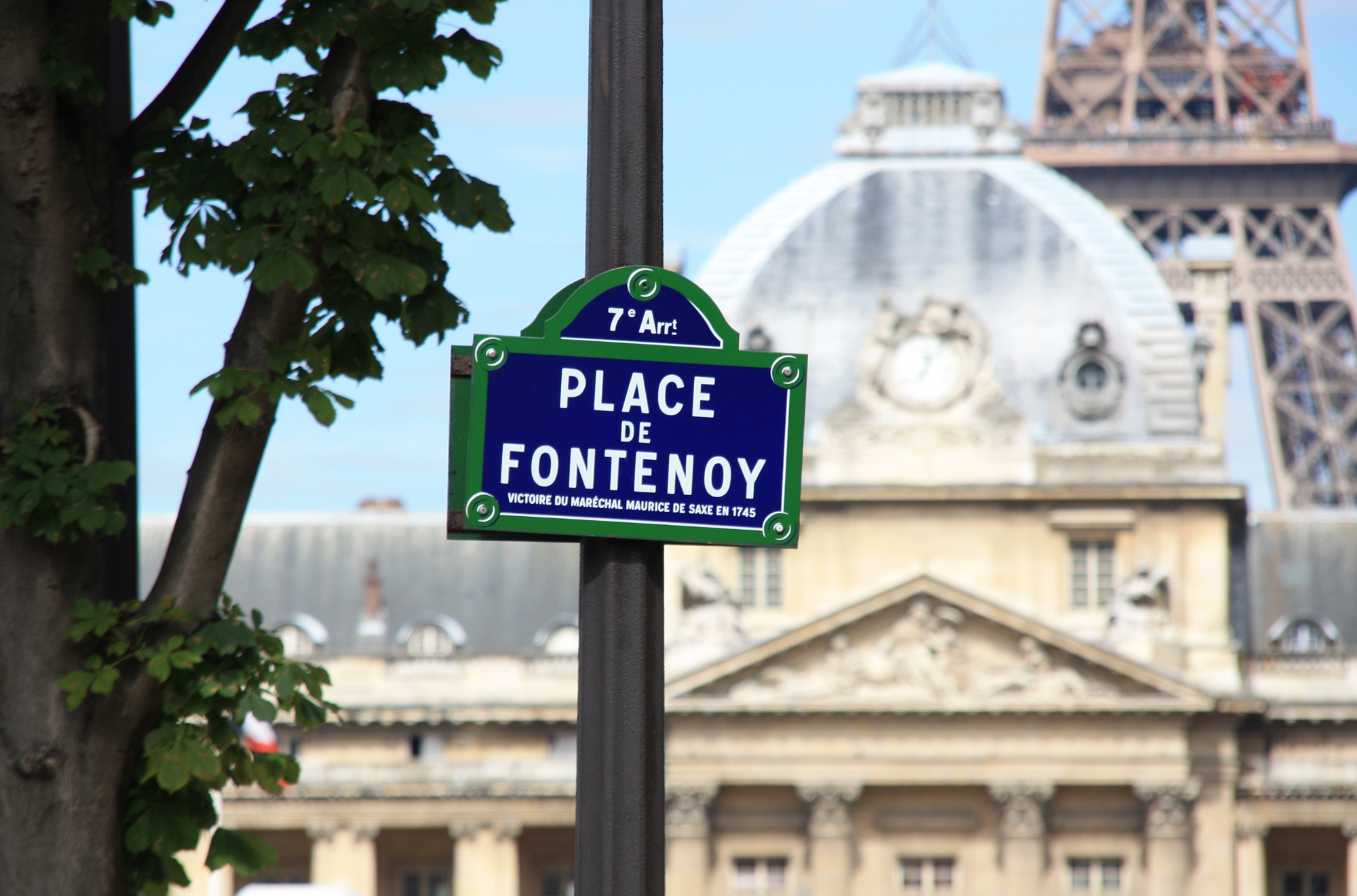
A street plate, reminding of the victory of Maréchal Maurice de Saxe in the Battle of Fontenoy (click to enlarge the inscription)

The Place de Fontenoy (French pronunciation: [plas də fɔ̃tənwa]) is a square in the 7th arrondissement of Paris, France, named after the victory of Maréchal Maurice de Saxe in the Battle of Fontenoy.

At number 7 is the World Heritage Centre, the headquarters of the UNESCO group.
