= 25 Cabot Square =

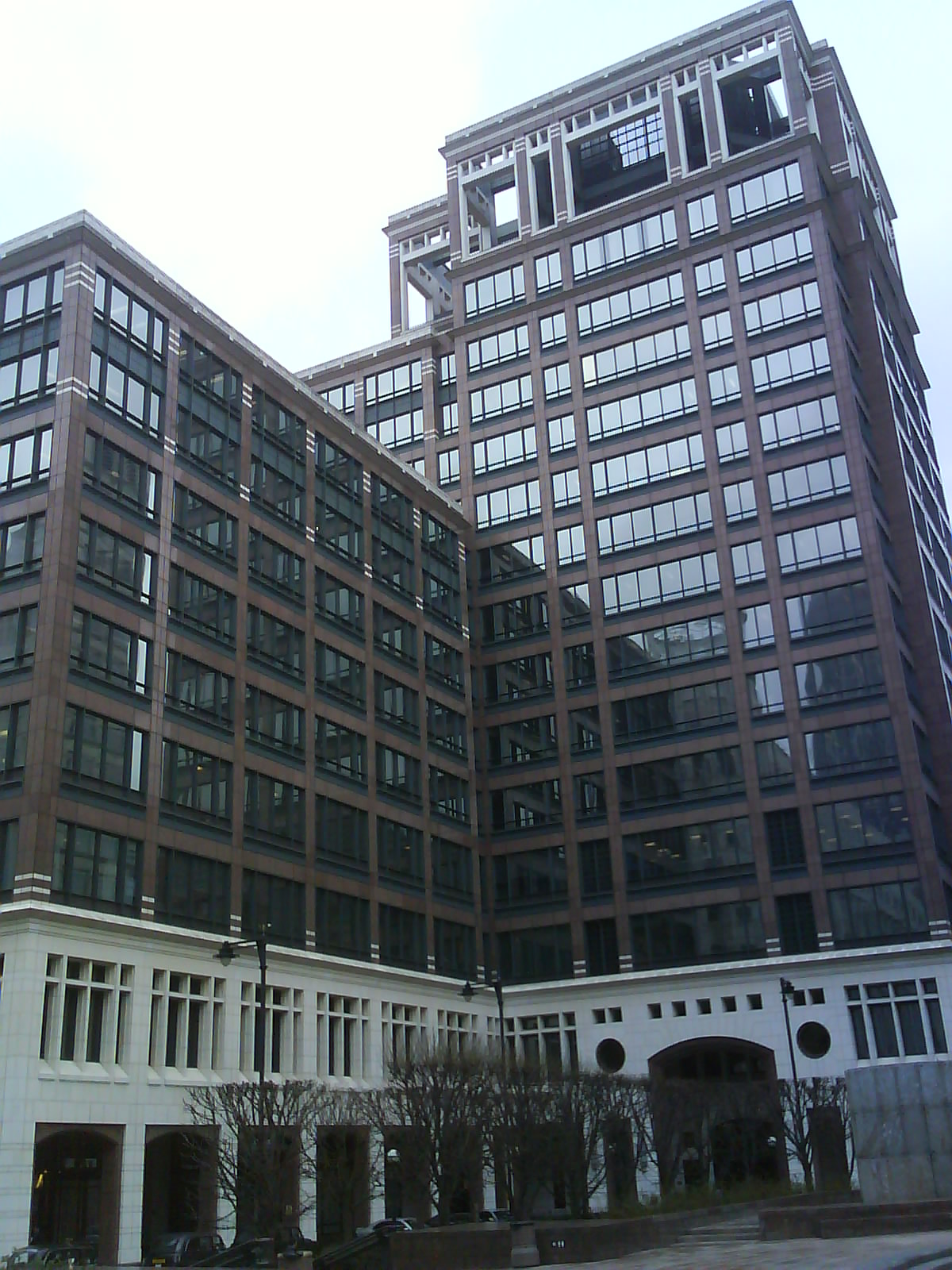
- Alternative names: The Cabot

General information
- Type: Commercial
- Architectural style: Post-modern
- Location: Canary Wharf; London, E14; United Kingdom
- Coordinates: 51°30′18″N 00°01′26.6″W
- Current tenants: Morgan Stanley
- Completed: 1991
- Owner: Link REIT

Height
- Roof: 81 m (266 ft)

Technical details
- Floor count: 17
- Floor area: 41,666.00 m^{2} (448,489.1 sq ft)
- Lifts/elevators: 12 (main)

Design and construction
- Architect: Skidmore, Owings & Merrill

25 Cabot Square is a 17-floor office building occupied by Morgan Stanley in the Canary Wharf development in London, England.

The architect on the project was Skidmore, Owings & Merrill, and the building was completed in 1991. It is 81 metres tall with a floorspace of 455,000 ft^{2}. In June 2017, construction started on a major refurbishment of the building with a phased completion from December 2018.

== See also ==
- Canary Wharf
- Morgan Stanley
