= UNESCO Headquarters =

Building in Paris, France

Coordinates: 48°50′58″N 2°18′22″E

The main UNESCO building as viewed from the Eiffel Tower

UNESCO Headquarters (Maison de l'UNESCO) is a building in Paris, France, which houses the United Nations Educational, Scientific and Cultural Organization (UNESCO). It was inaugurated on 3 November 1958 at number 7 Place de Fontenoy, and is open to the public.

== Design ==
The design of the UNESCO Headquarters building was the combined work of three architects: Bernard Zehrfuss (France), Marcel Breuer (Hungary), and Pier Luigi Nervi (Italy). Plans were also validated by an international committee of five architects composed of Lúcio Costa (Brazil), Walter Gropius (Germany/United States), Le Corbusier (France), Sven Markelius (Sweden) and Ernesto Nathan Rogers (Italy), with the collaboration of Eero Saarinen (Finland).

The main building, which houses the secretariat, consists of seven floors forming a three-pointed star. To this is added a building called the "accordion" and a cubic building, which is intended for permanent delegations and non-governmental organisations. These buildings occupy a trapezoidal area of land measuring 30,350 square metres (326,700 ft^{2}), cut in the northeast corner by the semi-circular shape of the Place de Fontenoy. It is bordered by avenues of Saxony, Segur de Suffren and Lowendal.

== Relations with France ==
The land on which the building is built is the property of the French State. By a decree of 22 December 1952, it was assigned to the Foreign Ministry to put at the disposal of UNESCO. This was done by a lease for a term of 99 years, renewable at a nominal rent (1000 francs per year), near the end of the lease. In addition, the residence of this intergovernmental organization on the French territory is governed by a headquarters agreement that defines its privileges and immunities. Both agreements were signed in Paris in 1954, respectively on 25 June and 25 July.

The French Parliament approved the lease by a law enacted on 6 August 1955, authorized the President of the Republic to ratify the Headquarters Agreement. The Headquarters Agreement entered into force on 23 November 1955. It was published by a decree of 11 January 1956.

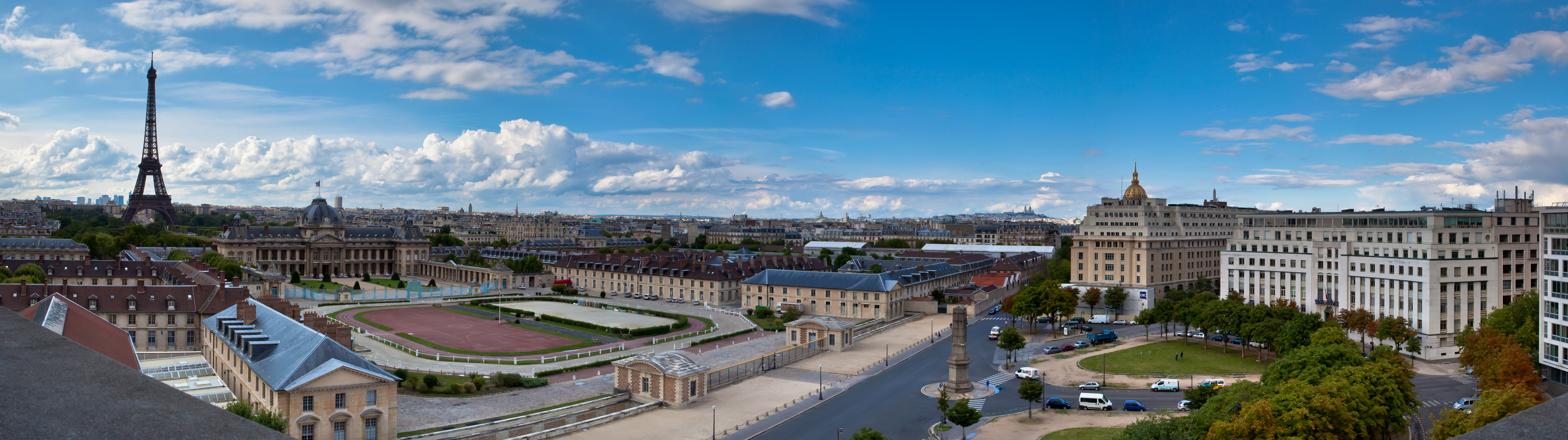
Panorama of Paris from the top of the World Heritage Centre

== See also ==
- World Heritage Site
- Westgate Las Vegas (the structure was inspired by the design of the UNESCO headquarters)
- List of Brutalist structures

== Bibliography ==
- Le Siège de l'Unesco à Paris, preface by Luther Evans, introduction by Françoise Choay, photographs by Lucien Hervé, Gerd Hatje, Stuttgart, 1958.
