= Dulwich College International School =

Dulwich College International may refer to:

- Dulwich College Bangkok
- Dulwich College Beijing
- Dulwich College Seoul
- Dulwich College Shanghai
- Dulwich College Singapore
- Dulwich College Suzhou
- Dulwich International High School Suzhou
- Dulwich International High School Zhuhai
