= Dulwich International High School Suzhou =

International school in Suzhou, China

- Simplified Chinese: 苏州德威国际高中
- Traditional Chinese: 蘇州德威國際高中
Transcriptions
Standard Mandarin
- Hanyu Pinyin: Sūzhōu Déwēi Gúojì Gāozhōng

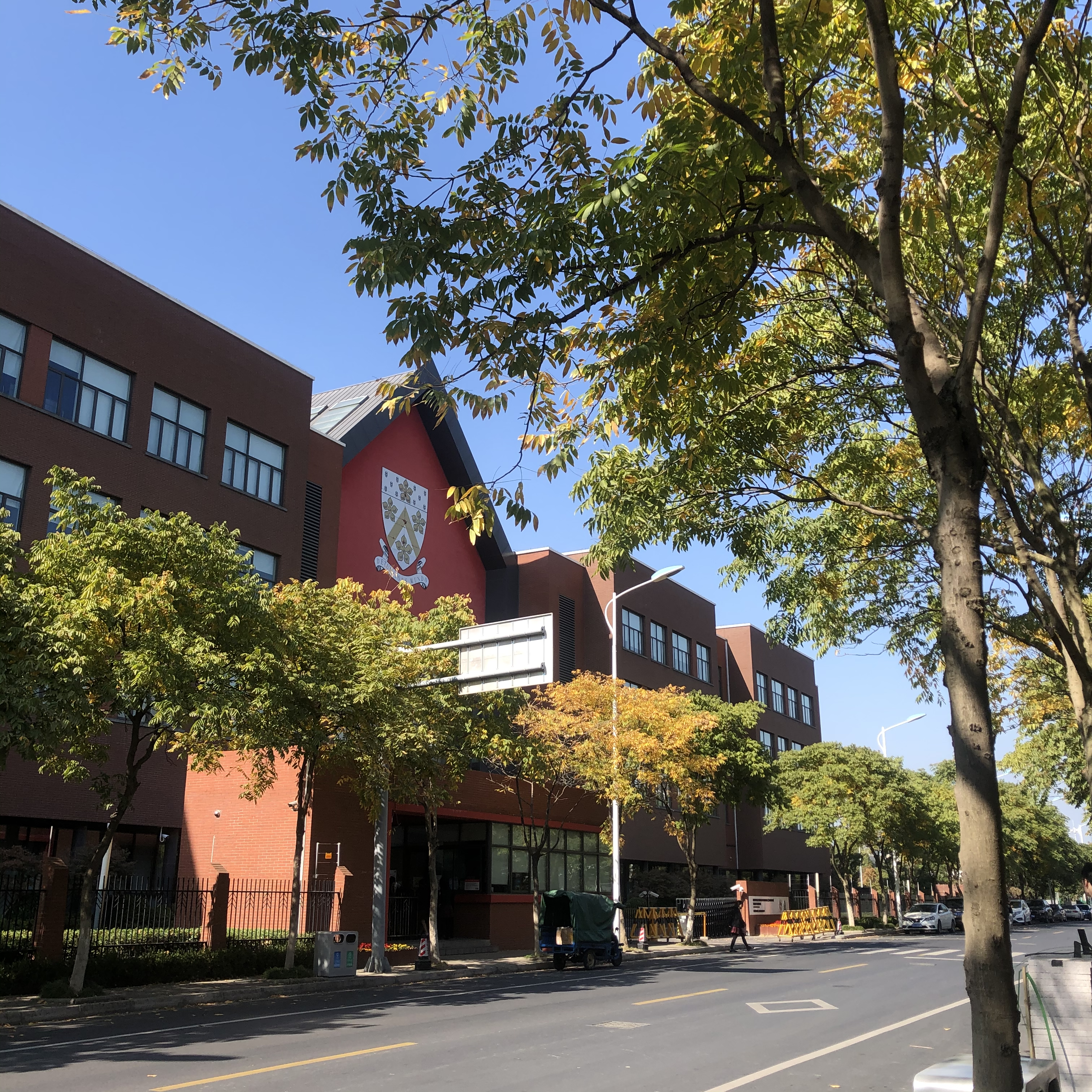
View of the school

Dulwich International High School, Suzhou, is an international school in Suzhou, China. It is part of the Dulwich College international network of schools, which follows the British educational system. The school offers the IGCSE and A-Level and offers various extra-curricular activities. Students come from a range of nationalities and the school aims to prepare them for success in higher education and beyond.

The school has approximately 400 students enrolled, from ages 14 to 19.

Edward Alleyn established the Dulwich College in London in 1619. There are now seven Dulwich College International (DCI) worldwide.

Dulwich International High School Suzhou, which opened in 2012, is the Dulwich family's sixth school. Until its new facilities were completed, DHSZ rented space on the Suzhou High School campus. DHSZ relocated to Suzhou Industrial Park in the summer of 2015. During 2026-27 the school will celebrate 15 years as a school.

== Location ==
Location: 360, Fangzhong Street, SIP, Suzhou, Jiangsu, PR China (港田路360号)

Post Code: 215021

== Curriculum ==
DHSZ offers two distinct programs, one of which is a three-year program with only one year of IGCSE and the other of which includes two years of IGCSE, rather than the local Chinese education system. The teachers come from various countries, and the students are educated entirely in English.

Compulsory courses include English, Chinese, Mathematics, Lifeskills, Drama and PE. Selective courses include economics, computer science, psychology, geography, arts, music, physics, chemistry, and biology. Students must choose different combinations of elective courses based on their interests or their planned future majors.

== Boarding ==
The school provides boarding for approximately 200 students.

All termly boarders live onsite in the Alleyn House (DHSZ/DCSZ Boarding House). The boarding house has separate places for girls and boys. Rooms are shared between two to four students.

In the past the weekly boarders lived in the Shackleton/Bancroft House approximately one kilometre away from the campus.

== See also ==
- Dulwich College
- Dulwich College Beijing
- Dulwich College Seoul
- Dulwich College Shanghai
- Dulwich College Singapore
- Dulwich College Suzhou
- Dulwich International High School Zhuhai
