= Humphrey Arthur Gilkes =

British Army officer and medical doctor

- Born: 13 October 1895; London, England
- Died: 11 July 1945 (aged 49); Djibouti
- Burial place: Djibouti New European Cemetery
- Relatives: Arthur Herman Gilkes (father)
- Military career
- Allegiance: United Kingdom
- Branch: British Army
- Service years: 1914–1919; 1923; 1940–1945
- Rank: Lieutenant Colonel
- Service number: 4006
- Conflicts: First World War; Second World War
- Awards: Military Cross & Three Bars

Humphrey Arthur Gilkes MC & Three Bars (13 October 1895 – 11 July 1945) was a British soldier and medical doctor. He is one of four soldiers to have been awarded the Military Cross four times, all in the First World War. He was a medical officer in the Colonial Medical Service between the wars. He also served in the British Army in the Second World War, and was killed in an aeroplane crash at Djibouti.

== Early life ==
Gilkes was the second of four sons of Arthur Herman Gilkes. He was educated at Dulwich College, where his father was the Master from 1885 to 1914. He played football for the First XI in 1910, rugby for the Second XV, and also played the violin. His brother Christopher Herman Gilkes was Master of Dulwich College from 1941 to 1953.

== First World War ==
Gilkes joined the Honourable Artillery Company as a private soldier after the outbreak of the First World War, and was commissioned as a second lieutenant in the London Regiment in September 1915, joining the 21st (County of London) Battalion (First Surrey Rifles). He served with the 142nd (6th London) Brigade in the 47th (1/2nd London) Division through the First World War. He became a temporary lieutenant in July 1916.

He was awarded the Military Cross (MC) on four occasions, for his actions as an intelligence officer between September 1917 and September 1918, on reconnaissance missions ahead of the British lines. He was awarded his first MC in September 1917. He was wounded in early 1918, and awarded a first Bar in March 1918, a second Bar in June 1918, and a third Bar in January 1919 for actions at Moislains on 2 September 1918. Two other officers received their third Bar in the same January 1919 edition of the London Gazette, Percy Bentley and Charles Gordon Timms, emulating Francis Wallington whose third Bar was gazetted on 13 September 1918.

== Later life ==
Gilkes read medicine at Christ Church, Oxford from 1919, and then trained at St Bartholomew's Hospital in London, qualifying as a doctor in 1922 and serving briefly as a lieutenant in the Royal Army Medical Corps from February to November 1923. He resigned his regular army commission, but remained a lieutenant in the Territorial Army Reserve of Officers. He joined the Colonial Medical Service, serving in Northern Rhodesia until 1936 and then in Trinidad until 1940. He was the author of two novels, Black (1935) and The Unclean Spirit (1937).

He rejoined the army in the Second World War, serving as a lieutenant colonel in the Royal Army Medical Corps in Uganda until 1943 and then in British Somaliland.

About to return home on leave, he was one of seven servicemen killed in an aeroplane crash at Djibouti, and buried in a collective grave at the New European Cemetery, Djibouti.
