= New European Cemetery, Djibouti =

Cemetery in Africa

Coordinates: 11.564988°N 42.157086°E

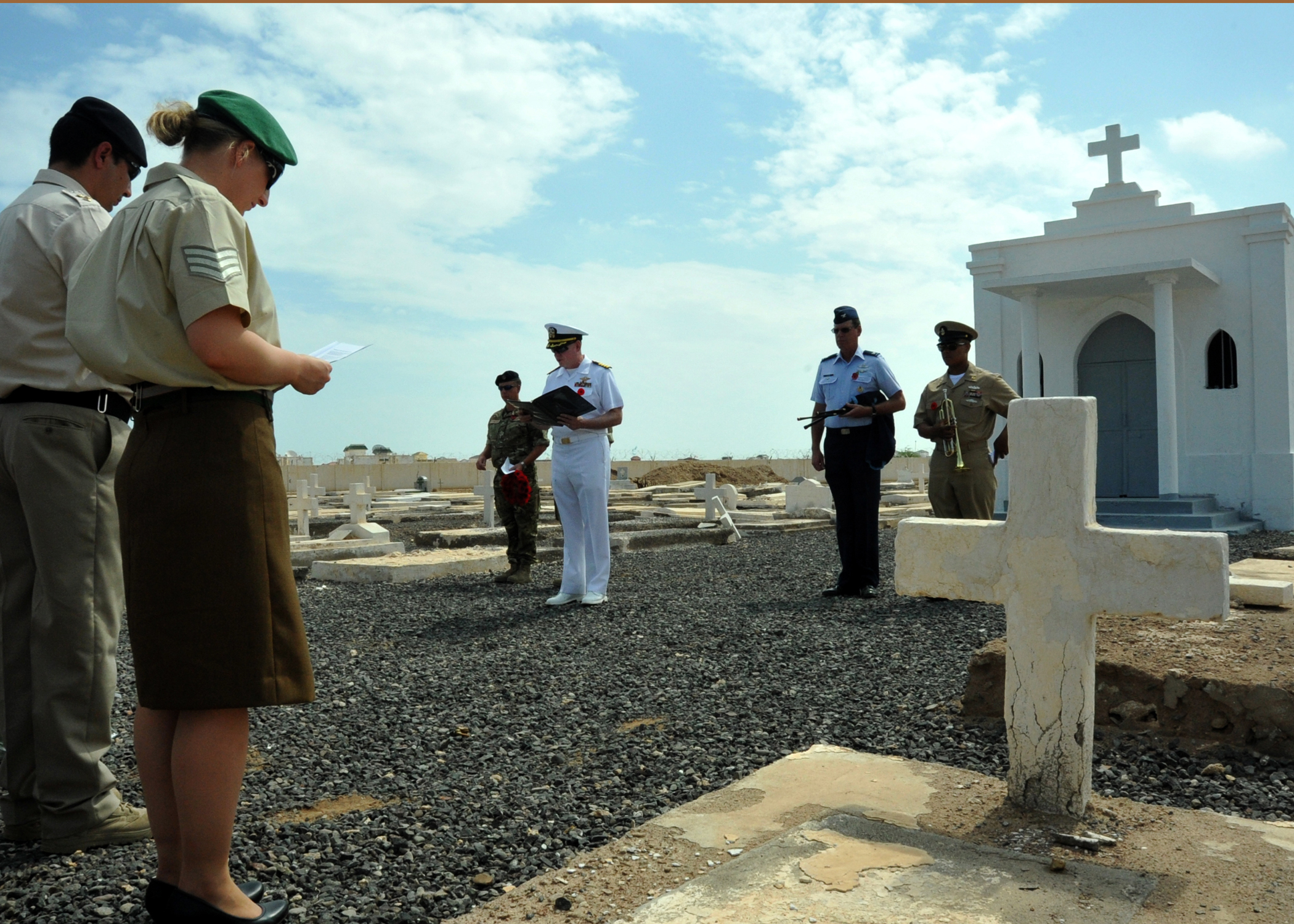
A joint Combined Joint Task Force – Horn of Africa, British Army and the Commonwealth service remembering fallen service members at the cemetery on Remembrance Sunday, 2012.

The Djibouti New European Cemetery is a cemetery in Djibouti City in Djibouti. The cemetery contains 850 graves of mostly Christian people including 13 Commonwealth War Graves Commission (CWGC) gravestones. The majority of CWGC graves in the cemetery commemorate airmen killed in the country in World War II.

It is located 150 meters from a dirt road off the N2 from Djibouti–Ambouli International Airport. It is located behind a wall and not visible from the main road.

Amongst the graves is that of Humphrey Arthur Gilkes (1895–1945), who received the Military Cross four times for his actions in the First World War. He was one of seven airmen killed in an air crash in Djibouti in 1945. The Royal Canadian Air Force Pilot Officer Lawrence Robert Maguire is buried in the cemetery.
