= Gilkes =

Gilkes is a surname. Notable people with the surname include:

- Alexander Gilkes (born 1979), British businessman
- Arthur Herman Gilkes (1849–1922), English educationalist, author, and clergyman, father of Christopher H.
- Cheryl Townsend Gilkes (born 1947), American sociologist and womanist scholar
- Christopher H. Gilkes (1898–1953), English educationalist, son of Arthur Herman
- Gilbert Gilkes (1845–1924), English engineer
- James Gilkes (born 1952), Guyanese sprinter
- Juliet Gilkes Romero (née Gilkes), British playwright
- Marshall Gilkes (born 1978), American trombonist
- Michael Gilkes (footballer) (born 1965), English footballer
- Michael Gilkes (writer) (1933–2020), Guyanese critic and dramatist
- Nick Gilkes (born 2005), Canadian racing driver

== See also ==
- Ebe Gilkes Quartet
- Gilkes Wilson and Company, British locomotive engineering firm
- Gilbert Gilkes & Gordon, British hydropower engineering firm
- Gilks, a surname
