= Gilkyson =

Gilkyson is a surname. Notable people with the surname include:

- Eliza Gilkyson (born 1950), American folk musician, daughter of Terry
- Gracie Gilkyson (born 2003), Canadian ice hockey player
- Terry Gilkyson (1916–1999), American folk singer, composer, and lyricist, father of Eliza and Tony
- Tony Gilkyson (born 1952), American musician, son of Terry
- Stephen R. Gilkyson, a Lieutenant Colonel of the 6th New Jersey in the American Civil War

== See also ==
- Gilkes
- Gilston
