= Percy Bentley (British Army officer) =

British Army officer (1891-1956)

- Born: 18 January 1891; Knottingley, Yorkshire
- Died: 8 July 1956 (aged 65); Pontefract, West Riding of Yorkshire
- Military career
- Allegiance: United Kingdom
- Branch: British Army
- Service years: 1910–1922
- Rank: Captain
- Units: 5th Battalion, King's Own Yorkshire Light Infantry
- Conflicts: First World War: Battle of Passchendaele; Battle of Havrincourt
- Awards: Military Cross & Three Bars; Mentioned in Despatches
- Other work: Mayor of Pontefract (1930–1931)

Percy Bentley MC & Three Bars (18 January 1891 – 8 July 1956) was an officer in the British Army in the First World War. He was one of four soldiers to be awarded the Military Cross four times, all in the First World War.

== Early life ==
Bentley was born in Knottingley, Yorkshire, where his family were auctioneers and valuers and involved with local politics. He was educated at The King's School, Pontefract and then Sedbergh School, where he joined the Officer Training Corps. He was commissioned as a second lieutenant in the Territorial Army in October 1910, joining the 5th Battalion of the King's Own Yorkshire Light Infantry (KOYLI), and was promoted to lieutenant in May 1914.

== First World War ==
Following the outbreak of the First World War, he was sent to France with his battalion in April 1915, in the 148th (3rd West Riding) Brigade of the 49th (West Riding) Infantry Division. His battalion was moved to the 187th (2/3rd West Riding) Brigade of the 62nd (2nd West Riding) Division in February 1918.

He served as the battalion adjutant from 1915 to 1919, and was promoted to the rank of temporary captain in June 1915 and then substantive captain in June 1916. He was wounded in 1915, and then suffered from rheumatism in late 1916, was wounded by a shell at Passchendale in 1917, and suffered from colitis in 1918.

He was awarded the Military Cross (MC) on four occasions. He was awarded his first MC in December 1916, was awarded a first Bar in September 1918, a second Bar in November 1918, and a third Bar in January 1919 for his actions at the Battle of Havrincourt in September 1918. Two other officers received their third Bar in the same January 1919 edition of the London Gazette, Humphrey Arthur Gilkes and Charles Gordon Timms, emulating Francis Victor Wallington whose third Bar was gazetted on 13 September 1918.

His brother Captain Will Bentley and his cousin Lieutenant Henry Bentley also served with the KOYLI during the war.

== Later life ==
He married Francis Ann Poskitt in 1917. She was the sister of the Roman Catholic priest Henry Poskitt, later Bishop of Leeds.

He resigned his commission in 1922 and returned to Bentley, leaving the army in order to join the family business. He commanded the guard of honour at the British Legion Conference held at Scarborough in 1928.

He was elected to serve as a Conservative representative on the Pontefract Borough Council from 1922 to 1945, and then from 1946 to 1949. He also served on the West Riding County Council, as an Alderman from 1933 to 1939. He was Mayor of Pontefract in 1930–31.

His wife died in 1955, and Bentley died at home the following year. He was survived by a son and three daughters.
