= Francis Wallington =

British Army officer during World War 1

Francis Victor Wallington
- Born: 16 October 1891
- Died: 15 February 1971 (aged 79)
- Military career
- Allegiance: United Kingdom
- Branch: British Army
- Service years: 1906–1923; 1939
- Rank: Captain
- Unit: Royal Field Artillery
- Conflicts: First World War
- Awards: Military Cross & Three Bars; Mentioned in Despatches

Francis Victor Wallington MC & Three Bars (16 October 1891 – 15 February 1971) was a decorated British Army officer. He was the first of four soldiers to be awarded the Military Cross four times, all in the First World War.

== Military career ==
Wallington was born in Woolwich. He joined the Royal Horse Artillery in 1906. He reached the rank of bombardier while serving with the 7th Brigade, RHA.

Early in the First World War, Wallington served as a soldier in the Royal Artillery, British Army, and reached the rank of serjeant. On 15 August 1914, he departed for France with the British Expeditionary Force. On 30 May 1916, he was commissioned into the Royal Artillery as a second lieutenant "for service in the field". On 2 October 1917, he was promoted to acting captain while he served as second-in-command of a battery of the Royal Field Artillery. On 30 November 1917, he was promoted to lieutenant and retained the acting rank of captain. He retired on 2 May 1923 and was granted the rank of captain.

Wallington married Gwendoline Constance Newton (1892–1936) in Lambeth in 1919. They lived in Abingdon, and had two sons Francis and Dennis, and a daughter Maureen.

Wallington later rejoined the British Army. On 7 March 1939, he became a captain and admin officer in the Royal Engineers. With the outbreak of the Second World War, he relinquished his appointment as an admin officer on 2 September 1939. He relinquished his commission in the Territorial Army on 2 September 1939.

Wallington died in Richmond-upon-Thames in 1971.

== Honours and decorations ==
For his service in the First World War, Wallington received the following campaign medals; the 1914 Star with clasp, the British War Medal and the Victory Medal. On 26 January 1917, he was Mentioned in Despatches. He was awarded the Military Cross four times; the first on 26 January 1917, the second on 16 August 1917, the third on 25 August 1917, and the fourth on 16 September 1918.

The citation for his first Military Cross read as follows:

For conspicuous gallantry in action. He displayed great courage and skill during wire-cutting operations in preparation for the attack. Later, he brought a trench mortar forward to an exposed position under heavy fire.

— London Gazette (26 January 1917)

The citation for his second Military Cross read as follows:

For conspicuous gallantry and devotion to duty. He showed great coolness and courage under heavy shell fire on many occasions. A fire having broken out in a neighbouring battery's gunpits, he volunteered to extinguish it, which he succeeded in doing, working all the time under heavy shell fire.

— London Gazette (14 August 1917)

The citation for his third Military Cross read as follows:

For conspicuous gallantry and devotion to duty in rushing to a dug-out in which men had been buried by shell fire and attempting to dig out the men, aided by two other officers. He himself was in a state of collapse, but insisted on helping to carry the wounded to a dressing station under shell fire.

— London Gazette (24 August 1917)

The citation for his forth and final Military Cross read as follows:

For conspicuous gallantry and devotion to duty under close enemy machine-gun fire. This officer took forward two teams and succeeded in moving off two guns. One of the teams was shot down, but he succeeded in bringing in the other gun. His gallantry and devotion to duty during recent operations was most marked.

— London Gazette (13 September 1918)

== See also ==
- Three other British soldiers to be awarded the MC and three bars: Percy Bentley, Humphrey Arthur Gilkes, Charles Gordon Timms
