= Dulwich International High School Zhuhai =

International school in Zhuhai, China

- Traditional Chinese: 珠海德威國際高中
- Simplified Chinese: 珠海德威国际高中
Transcriptions
Standard Mandarin
- Hanyu Pinyin: Zhūhǎi Déwēi Guójì Gāozhōng
Yue: Cantonese
- Jyutping: zyu1 hoi2 dak1 wai1 gwok3 zai3 gou1 zung1

Dulwich International High School Zhuhai is an international senior high school in Zhuhai, Guangdong, China. It is on the property of YungWing School Zhuhai (珠海容闳学校). It is affiliated with Dulwich College. The new campus of Dulwich International High School Zhuhai is situated in Hengqin district in August 2021. On 22 February 2024, Department of Education of Guangdong Province approve Dulwich International High School Zhuhai from International school to Chinese-foreign Cooperation in Running Schools with YungWing High school.

== See also ==
- Dulwich College Beijing
- Dulwich College London
- List of international schools
- Dulwich International College
- Dulwich College Shanghai
- Dulwich International High School Suzhou
