= Ronald Groves =

Ronald Groves MA BSc (Oxon); FRIC, (19 August 1908 – 8 February 1991) was a noted educationalist and academic and was Master of Dulwich College from 1954 to 1966.

== Early life ==
He was born the son of John Ackroyd and Annie Groves in Bradford. He was educated at Bradford Grammar School and went on to Christ Church, Oxford, from where he received a First Class Honours degree in natural sciences (chemistry) in 1931. In 1939 he married Hilary Annot (the younger daughter of a former Master of Dulwich College, George Smith), with whom he had two sons.

== Career ==
Having completed his education he went on to become assistant master from 1931 to 1932 at Bradfield College, and then from 1932 to 1935 at Worksop College. In 1935 he took up the role of senior science master at The King's School, Canterbury and became bursar of that school in 1937. In 1943 he began his first headmastership at Campbell College, Belfast, and remained at that school until 1954. He left Campbell College in 1954 to become master of Dulwich College, where he remained until 1966. During his time at Dulwich College, he also became chairman of the Food Standards Committee from 1959 to 1962.

Following his retirement from Dulwich College in 1966, he became an adviser to the Joint Working Party of Governing Bodies' Association and Headmasters' Conference until 1973. From 1969 he was secretary of the Sir Richard Stapley Educational Trust. He was also a trustee of King's College Hospital and a member of the council of the King's College Hospital Medical School.

He was a member of the Athenaeum Club as well as the MCC.

Academic offices
| Preceded by Christopher H GILKES; The Deputy Master was Acting Master for 12 months following the death of Gilkes | Master of Dulwich College; 1954–1966 | Succeeded by Charles W Lloyd |
