= Dulwich College =

Public school in London, England

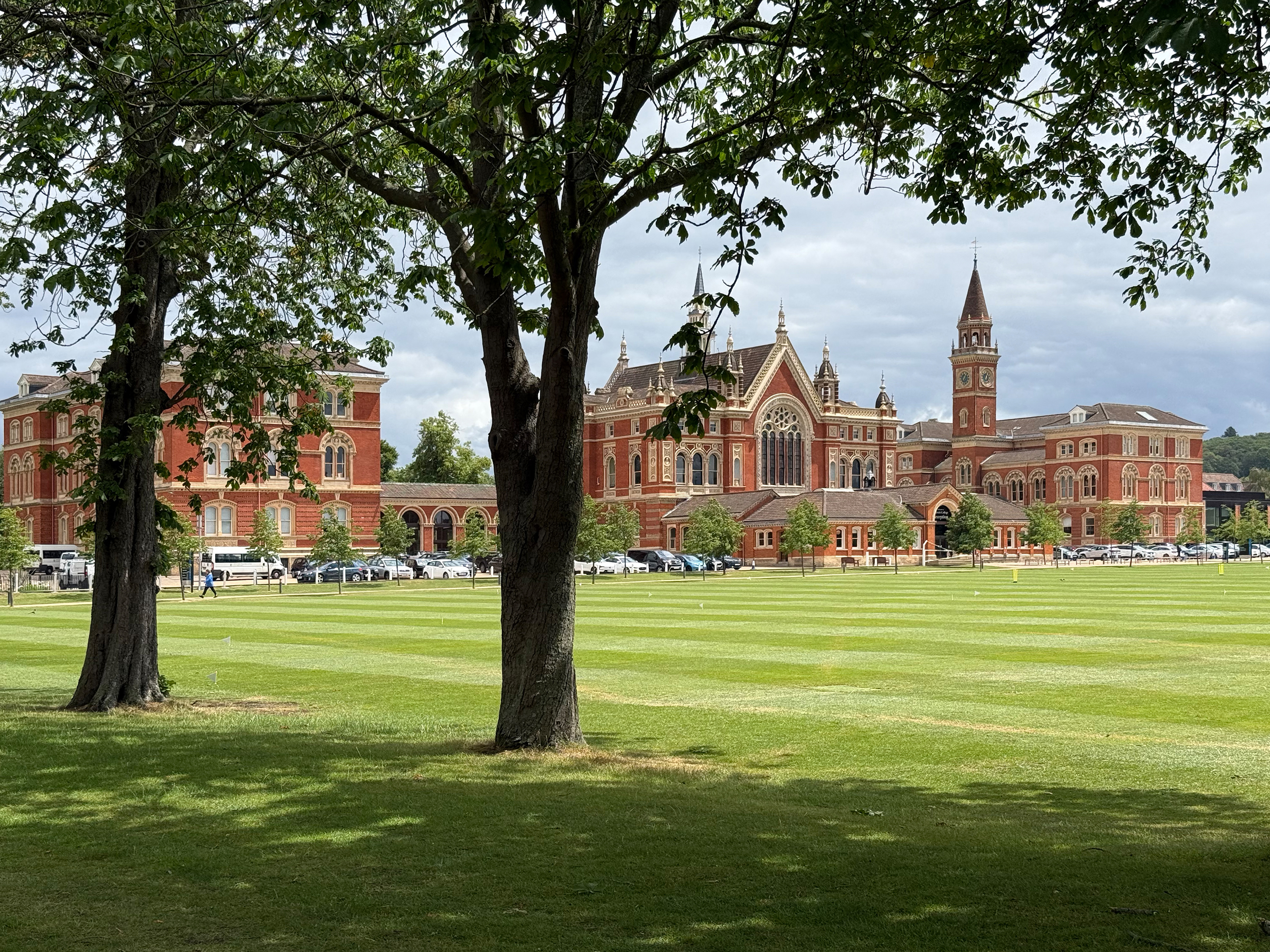

Location
- Dulwich Common, Dulwich; London, SE21 7LD; England; 51°26′22″N 00°05′03″W

Information
- Type: Public school Private day and boarding school
- Motto: Latin: Detur Gloria Soli Deo (Let Glory Be Given To God Alone)
- Established: 1619; 407 years ago
- Founder: Edward Alleyn
- Local authority: Southwark London Borough Council
- Department for Education URN: 100861 Tables
- Chair: Adrian JS Carr
- The Master: Robert Milne
- Gender: Boys
- Age range: 2–19
- Enrolment: 1,820 (2018)
- Capacity: 1,750
- Student to teacher ratio: 7:1
- Campus size: 75-acre (30 ha)
- Campus type: Suburban
- Houses: Day: 8; Boarding: 3
- Colours: Royal blue and black
- Publication: Alleynian
- Budget: £53,687,297 (2024)
- Revenue: £58,244,278 (2024)
- Affiliations: Alleyn's School; Eton Group; HMC; James Allen's Girls' School
- Alumni: Old Alleynians
- Website: www.dulwich.org.uk
- "Dulwich College, registered charity no. 1150064". Charity Commission for England and Wales.

Dulwich College is a public school (English private day and boarding school) for boys aged 2–18, in Dulwich, London, England. As a public school, it began as the College of God's Gift, founded in 1619 by Elizabethan actor Edward Alleyn, with the original purpose of educating 12 poor scholars. It began to grow into a large school from 1857 and took its current form in 1870, when it moved into its current premises.

The school is included in The Schools Index as one of the 150 best private schools in the world and among the top 30 senior schools in the UK. It is a member of both the Headmasters' and Headmistresses' Conference and the Eton Group.

Admission by examination is mainly into years 3, 7, 9, and 12 (i.e. ages 7, 11, 13, and 16 years old) to the Junior, Lower, Middle and Upper Schools into which the college is divided. In the 2025 A-levels, the school saw 67.7% of its candidates score A*/A.

== History ==
=== 1619: The College of God's Gift ===
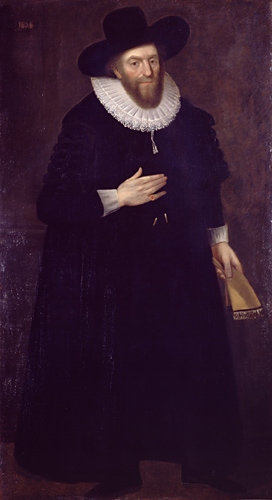
Edward Alleyn, founder of the School

On 21 June 1619, the College of God's Gift was established in Dulwich by Edward Alleyn with the signing letters patent by James I. The term "Dulwich College" was used colloquially from that date, such as in 1675 when John Evelyn described his visit to Dulwich College in his Diary. However, for at least 263 years this colloquialism was incorrect as the school was part of the overall charitable Foundation. Edward Alleyn, as well as being a famous Elizabethan actor, for whom Christopher Marlowe wrote his title roles, performed at the Rose Theatre, was also a man of great property and wealth, derived mainly from places of entertainment including theatres and bear-gardens. There is no documentary evidence for the legend that he owned brothels. He was "Chief Maister, Ruler and Overseer of [the King's] games of Beares, Bulls, Mastiff Dogs and Mastiff Bitches". Allegations that Alleyn turned his attention towards charitable pursuits out of fear for his moral well-being have been traced to the 19th-century journalist George Sala and questioned, though never firmly answered in the negative.

Since 1605, Alleyn had owned the manorial estate of Dulwich, and it may have been around this time that he first had the idea of establishing a college or hospital for poor people and the education of poor boys. The building on Dulwich Green of a chapel, a schoolhouse and twelve almshouses began in 1613 and was completed in the autumn of 1616. On 1 September 1616 the chapel was consecrated by the Archbishop of Canterbury, who became the official Visitor. However, Edward Alleyn faced objections from Francis Bacon, the Lord Chancellor, in getting the patent of incorporation that was necessary to secure the Foundation's status as a college. It was Alleyn's persistence that led to the foundation being endowed by James I's signing of the letters patent.

The charity originally consisted of a Master, Warden, four fellows, six poor brothers, six poor sisters and twelve poor scholars (orphans admitted from the age of six years), who became the joint legal owners of Alleyn's endowment of the manor and lands of Dulwich, collectively known as the Members of the College. The poor brothers and sisters and scholars were to be drawn from the four parishes that were most closely tied to Alleyn (being St Botolph's Bishopsgate where he was born, St Giles, Middlesex where he had built his Fortune Theatre, St Saviour's Southwark where he had the Paris Bear Garden and had managed the Rose Theatre, and St Giles Camberwell where the college was founded). The business of the charity was conducted in the name of these 30 members by the Master, Warden and four Fellows (Chaplain, Schoolmaster, Usher and Organist).

Alleyn drew upon the experience of other similar establishments in order to formulate the statutes and ordinances of the college, including drawing on the statutes of the already ancient Winchester College and visiting the more contemporary establishments of Sutton's Hospital (now Charterhouse School) and Croydon's Hospital (now the almshouses of the Whitgift Foundation). Among the many statutes and ordinances signed by Alleyn that pertained to the charitable scheme were provisions that the scholars were "entitled to stay until they were eighteen". And "to be taught in good and sound learning ... that they might be prepared for university or for good and sweet trades and occupations". Another stipulation was that the Master and Warden should always be unmarried and of Alleyn's blood, and surname, and if the former was impossible then at least of Alleyn's surname. Alleyn also made provision that the people of Dulwich should be able to have their men children instructed at the school for a fee as well as children from outside Dulwich for a separate fee.

The next two centuries were beset by both external difficulties such as diminishing financial fortunes and failing buildings as well as internal strife between the various Members of the College. The Official Visitor, the Archbishop of Canterbury, whose function was to ensure that the statutes were obeyed, was called in many times. The lack of a disinterested body of governors and of any official connection to the Universities of Oxford or Cambridge contributed significantly to the school failing to fulfill Alleyn's vision in its first two centuries. Some notable Masters did preside over the college during this time, including James Allen (the first Master to drop the 'y' from his surname), who in 1741 made over to the college six houses in Kensington, the rents of which were to be used in the establishment of two small schools in Dulwich, one for boys from the village, the other for girls to read and sew, out of which James Allen's Girls' School (JAGS) arose. Dr John Allen (1771–1843) of Holland House was a most learned and influential man, but neglected the education of the Poor Scholars.

Having already obtained an Act in 1805 allowing them to enclose and develop 130 acres (0.53 km^{2}) of common land within the manor, the college was granted the power by the 1808 Dulwich College Building Act to extend the period over which leases ran, from 21 years as laid down by Alleyn, to 84 years, thus attracting richer tenants and bringing in large sums of money. The increased wealth of the college eventually resulted in the Charity Commission establishment of an enquiry into the advisability of widening the application of the funds to those extra beneficiaries Alleyn had specified in later amended clauses to the foundation's original statutes. Although the Master of the Rolls, Lord Langdale, rejected the appeal in 1841 on the grounds that Alleyn had no right to alter the original statutes, he did express dissatisfaction with the college's educational provision.

Immediately after this criticism, the Dulwich College Grammar School was established in 1842 for the education of poor boys from Dulwich and Camberwell. To this school were transferred the boys of the James Allen Foundation, leaving James Allen's school for girls only. The Old Grammar School, as it became known, was erected in 1841 opposite the Old College, designed by Sir Charles Barry, the architect of the Palace of Westminster. It still exists today. The foundation scholars of the college continued to receive an education far short of Alleyn's vision, despite further attempts at reform by the Visitor. In 1854, the college was investigated by a new Commission set up by the 1853 Charitable Trusts Act, which led to the 1857 Dulwich College Act.

=== 1857: The "Upper School" of Alleyn's College of God's Gift ===
Dulwich College Act 1857
- Act of Parliament
- Parliament of the United Kingdom
- Long title: An Act for confirming a Scheme of the Charity Commissioners for the College of God's Gift in Dulwich in the County of Surrey, with certain Alterations.
- Citation: 20 & 21 Vict. c. 84
- Territorial extent: United Kingdom

Dates
- Royal assent: 25 August 1857
- Commencement: 25 August 1857 (Note: The Acts of Parliament (Commencement) Act 1793.)

Status: Current legislation

Text of statute as originally enacted

The "College of God's Gift" became "Alleyn's College of God's Gift" when, on 25 August 1857, the Dulwich College Act 1857 (20 & 21 Vict. c. 84) dissolved the existing corporation and the charity was reconstituted with the new name. It was split into two parts with a joint Board of Governors: the educational (for the college) and the eleemosynary (for the charity). The Master, Warden, four fellows and 12 servants were pensioned off, although Alleyn's wishes were, and continue to be, respected, as sixteen pensioners (being the equivalent of 12 poor brothers and sisters plus four fellows) still live in flats in the Old College, looked after by a Warden. As for the Master, he was still to be appointed as the head of the new school.

In its new form, the Master of the College was Reverend Alfred Carver (Master from April 1857 to April 1883). Carver successfully fought with the Chairman of the Governors, the Rev William Rogers, to create a public school with high academic standards. He was the first Master not to share the name of the school's founder "Alleyn" (or latterly "Allen"). The educational college was split into an "Upper" and "Lower" school. The "Upper school" was for boys between 8 and 18, to be taught a wide and detailed syllabus, and continued to be colloquially referred to as "Dulwich College". The "Lower school" for boys between 8 and 16, had lower fees and a syllabus and was aimed at children of the industrial and poorer classes. The Lower School was the incorporation of the boys from the grammar school established in the previous decade and was referred to as "Alleyn's College of God's Gift", although this was the name of the complete charitable foundation.

=== 1870: The New College ===
Dulwich College was included in Howard Staunton's 1865 book, The Great Schools of England, who wrote of the unusually comprehensive [scheme of instruction] and by the mid-1860s such was the enhanced reputation of the school that the pressure for places led to the introduction of a competitive examination. In 1869 the upper school took possession of the current site, referred to as the "New College", but it was not until Founder's Day (21 June) 1870 that the new college was officially opened by the Prince and Princess of Wales. The new college buildings, sited in the 24 hectares (59 acres) of Dulwich Common, were designed by Charles Barry Jr. (the eldest son of Sir Charles Barry). The lower school alone continued to occupy the Old College in Dulwich Village from 1870 until it was moved to its new (and current) premises in East Dulwich in 1887.

The present school colours and school magazine (The Alleynian) were established in the 1860s and 1870s, as were school societies such as Debating and Natural Science. By the time Canon Carver retired from the position of Master in 1882, Dulwich College was said to have expanded more rapidly in the previous 25 years than any other establishment and to be "holding its own at universities", to have "won a large number of places of honour in the Indian and Home Civil Service" and "at the Royal Military College of Woolwich" and to be well represented among "the public schools medals of the Royal Geographical Society and the prizes of the Art Schools of the Royal Academy".

=== 1882: Separation from Alleyn's School; the college's 'Golden Age' ===
Despite its excellent reputation, the college was the focus of pressure by the Charity Commissioners and other parties (including the Board of Governors and the outlying parishes named in Edward Alleyn's will) to reorganise it and divert much of its endowment to other schemes. The Master, Canon Carver, resisted these pressures for many years, finally winning an appeal in 1876 at the highest possible level (the Privy Council) where Lord Selborne ruled in his favour. In 1882, the Charity Commissioners finally issued a scheme that Canon Carver found acceptable. This passed into law by Act of Parliament and resulted in the Upper and Lower schools being officially split into separate institutions.

The Upper School became Dulwich College (officially for the first time) and the Lower became Alleyn's School. Both schools remained within the College of God's Gift charitable foundation (along with James Allen's Girls' School, St Olave's and St Saviour's Grammar School, and the three Central Foundation schools in Finsbury and Bishopsgate).

Two Boards of Governors came into being. Both Dulwich College and Alleyn's School were to be managed by the college Governors, who also administered the Chapel and Picture Gallery. The Estates and Almshouses were placed in the hands of the Estates Governors. The foundation and the college are still governed under the same arrangement. The Archbishop of Canterbury's position as Visitor was also changed to that of Honorary Visitor of Alleyn's College of God's Gift, his powers being vested in the Charity Commissioners. Dulwich College's income is derived from the contributions by the Estates Governors, among whom the College Governors are well represented (having eight of the twenty five places) Canon Carver retired at this point, being the first headmaster to be both appointed and retired by Act of Parliament.

Canon Carver was said to have given the college a body, but Arthur Herman Gilkes (Master from 1885 to 1914) to have given it a soul, with his noble ideals of scholarship and public service. He founded the College Mission in a poverty-stricken part of Camberwell.

London County Council scholars were admitted to Dulwich College from 1903. The college was saved from bankruptcy by the "Dulwich College Experiment" or "Gilkes Experiment", the work of A. H. Gilkes's son Christopher Gilkes (Master from 1941 to 1953), the forerunner of the state "Assisted Places Scheme", by which the majority of boys selected to attend the college had their fees paid by local councils. This resulted in an academic "renaissance" of the college, which came to a climax from the late 1950s when the college was at the forefront of the schools winning awards on entry to Oxford and Cambridge.

== School arms ==
Coat of arms of Dulwich College
Notes Granted in 1935. Crest On a wreath Argent and Gules, issuant from flames of fire, a cubit arm, the hand grasping a heart, all Proper. Escutcheon Argent, a chevron between three cinquefoils Gules; a chief Ermine, thereon a cinquefoil of the second. Motto 'Detur Gloria Soli Deo'

Edward Alleyn's coat of arms

When Edward Alleyn founded the school he was awarded a coat of arms and crest. This was used by the school until, in 1935, it was decreed by the College of Arms that it was the exclusive property of Edward Alleyn and his family. The new arms granted by the College of Arms were very similar to the old ones, retaining most of the features. Deism and learning are represented by the flames in the crest. From the ring of flames an arm with a hand holding a heart protrudes. This probably symbolises charity and has a twofold meaning. First, it represents Alleyn's charitable intentions, and second it recalls Alleyn's famous speech, written by Ben Jonson, when he presented King James I with the flaming heart of London during The Magnificent Entertainment, involving a procession through the streets and through triumphal arches by which the City of London welcomed King James I from Scotland in 1604. The lower portion of the shield incorporates the original shield being an argent (silver) background on which are placed a chevron (bent bar) dividing three cinquefoils gules (red five-leafed flowers).

== Houses ==
Dulwich College's new buildings in 1869

=== Boarding Houses ===
Boarders now belong to one of three boarding houses, although the number of boarding houses has fluctuated over time. Those up to age 16 (Year 11) live in The Orchard, while boys of the Upper School (Year 12 and Year 13) live in either Ivyholme or Blew House.

After the college was reconstituted in 1857, most of the boys were day-boys, but provision was made for boarders, and the Governors licensed three boarding houses to be kept by respectable ladies in the village (hence they were then known as dames' houses). A fourth was added soon afterwards. The number of functioning boarding houses has fluctuated between one and five since that point and in total there have been six different houses:

Blew House
Now one of the two senior houses, it was moved to its current position on College Road in the 1930s on the site of what had previously been the Master's garden (who had been residing in the south block of the New College). The original Blew House is called Old Blew House and still stands in Dulwich. Blew House was the only house to remain in commission throughout the Second World War for Alleynians and became a senior house at this point.

Ivyholme
The second of the two current senior houses, it too was moved to its current position on College Road in the 1930s. It was bombed during the Second World War but was re-opened soon after as a senior house. During the Second World War whilst housing students of the School of Oriental and African Studies (who were going through a crash course in languages sponsored by the War Office) it was also run by the Master of the College.

The Orchard
This is the only junior house still functioning as a boarding house. It was bombed during the Second World War but was re-opened as one of two junior houses very close to the war ending. During the Second World War, like Ivyholme, it housed students of the School of Oriental and African Studies who were going through a crash course in languages sponsored by the War Office.

Elm Lawn
This was the house in which P.G.Wodehouse once boarded prior to it becoming a junior house. After the Second World War it re-opened as a junior house, along with The Orchard. In 1949 the boys of Elm Lawn were moved into Bell House (see below) and it became the home of the Master of the College, and still is today.

Bell House
This 18th-century building close to Dulwich Picture Gallery became the family home of the Master of the College in 1927 who until then had lived with his family in the south block of the New College. The Master moved out of this premises during the Second World War into Ivyholme. When Ivyholme reopened as a boarding house it was decided that the Master should not return to Bell House because it was too large for the purposes of a family residence. The Master moved to The Chestnuts and then in 1949 to Elm Lawn. Meanwhile, Bell House was adapted as a boarding house and became the second junior house, replacing Elm Lawn. In 1993 it was returned to private ownership, as the college recognised the lack of need for a second junior boarding house.

Carver House
As the number of boys requiring boarding increased towards the end of the Second World War a fifth house was created by converting the cricket pavilion. It was named after Canon Carver, first Master of the reconstituted College, but it did not last long in this form.

==== Boarding house clubs and colours ====
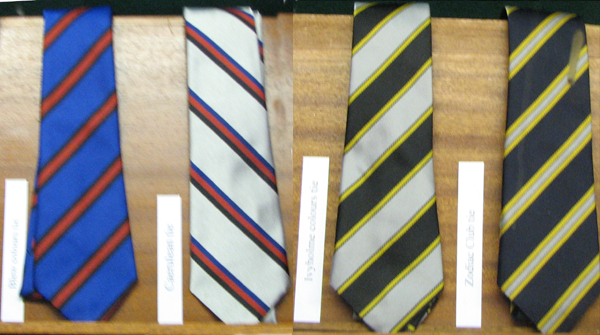
The ties denoting from left to right, Blew house colours, Caerulean Club membership, Ivyholme colours, and Zodiac Club membership

The colour system also extended to the boarding houses due to their particular impact on college life. At one time, Bell, Ivyholme and Blew had their own sports teams and their own distinct colours. Those awarded colours could wear ties and caps and for outstanding contribution the house blazer was awarded. Boarders with no colours could wear black ties to distinguish them from day boys.

Today, senior boys can still become members of the Zodiac and Caerulean Clubs for Ivyholme and Blew respectively. The house captain, who is automatically a member of the club, controls membership of clubs, and such membership confers the right to wear a special tie. When, across the school, the uniform was standardised in 1970, the tradition of the house blazers disappeared save for the House Captain who, if he has earned full school colours, may wear the house blazer.

==== Gordon Bowl ====
This trophy was presented to the college prior to the Second World War. It was a trophy competed for by boarders only presented by an Old Alleynian, A. G. Gordon. It was originally competed for by the four boarding houses (when there was no junior/senior distinction), but after the Second World War only by the senior houses Blew House and Ivyholme until 2017, the year which Orchard were re-added to the competition. It is still played for today.

=== Day Houses ===
All boys are members of one of eight day houses or Athletic Houses as they were originally known. The Houses were the brainchild of W.D. ('Scottie') Gibbon, an assistant master and rugby coach. The idea was decided upon in 1919 and in the school magazine, The Alleynian, of March 1920 the process was described. The division would be into six houses to be named after distinguished Englishmen of the Elizabethan period (see table below). The name of Shakespeare was omitted as being considered pre-eminent. Upon their original creation Boarders and Day Boys were divided thus: Grenville included Blew House, Marlowe included The Orchard, Spenser included Elm Lawn, Sidney included Ivyholme and two entirely Day-boy houses were created: Drake and Raleigh. In 1982 two more Houses (Jonson and Howard) were added due to an increased College roll.

The athletic houses were created to improve the standard of games at the college, which had deteriorated during the First World War. Before the creation of these houses, the most keenly anticipated matches were the Boarders vs Day-Boys or the Prefects vs The Rest of the School. The Athletic Houses produced, and still produce, Big Sides and Little Sides for competition. Big Sides are teams that include players who also represent the school and Little Sides are teams that do not include school sporting representatives. A boy's house is decided randomly or through family connection where possible. The houses continue to compete in sporting and cultural competitions (such as music, drama, chess and debating). The Cock House Shield or Cup are presented to the leading House at the end of the school year taking into account all competitions.

== School uniform and colours ==
The dress code for pupils of Dulwich College depends on the boarding or day houses a boy might belong to, the sports teams represented, or whether a boy has attained school colours or become a prefect. Alleyn had prescribed the clothing of poor scholars to be "a white calico surplice, a long coat such as that worn by Christ's Hospital boys, of good cloth of sad (dark and sober) colour, a bodice lined with canvas, skirts with cotton lining, canvas shirts, white cotton drawers, knitted stockings, shoes and belt, a girdle and a black cap." This is how boys were dressed for more than two centuries, until the new foundation in 1857.

In 1863, the Master, Alfred Carver, decreed the uniform should be "Short tunic buttoned to the chin, trousers of an Oxford mixture, an ordinary rifle cap with a broad band and narrow peak, and a dark coloured Inverness cape for winter." Under Carver, boys still wore waistcoats of varied hues and "the latest creations in neckties". This was suppressed in 1883 by the new Master, Welldon, whose first rule on arrival was that the boys should wear uniform, a forerunner of the subfusc jackets of today.

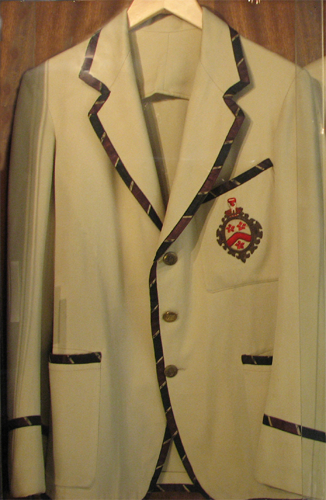
Example of the white blazer only awarded to the most prominent sportsmen

The colours of the college, blue and black, according to tradition are based on Marlborough College although Haileybury is more likely the model. It is known that in 1864 caps were introduced, with cross ribbons of purple soon altered to blue. The college arms were added in 1875. From this time, the colour scheme arose for rewarding achievement, limited at first to sport with blazers for the 1st and 2nd team of the major sports, rugby and cricket (as well as ties, caps and squares). The minor sports also had colours, although these did not extend to a full blazer. Rather, athletics, fives, shooting, boxing, tennis, swimming, gymnastics, fencing and waterpolo had blazer badges (plus caps and ties). Additionally, the boarding houses, which historically had a disproportionate effect on the sporting life of the college, had their own boarding house colours. By 1909 there were seventeen different caps plus a variety of blazers. The striped jackets for prominent sportsmen also conferred certain privileges, such as having the right to proceed first through the doors of centre block.

Further emphasising status were special caps for major sports colours. Rugby had a pie-shaped porker with tassels. Likewise, prefects wearing caps quartered in blue and black, could unbutton their jackets and keep their hands in their trousers. The most exclusive items took precedence even over the striped blazers of members of the 1st teams for major sports. The very best rugby players were on rare occasions awarded the rugby honours cap, and perhaps the most fabled item of all, still displayed in the college's Wodehouse library, was the white blazer. This was only awarded on the recommendation of the Field Sports Committee (see Sport section) with the essential requirement being that a boy be a member of both the Cricket 1st XI and the Rugby 1st XV and display prominence in a minor sport (e.g. boxing, fives, squash, fencing, shooting).

This uniform changed little until the 1960s (save for the arms change in 1935, and the addition of the house colours on sports shirts following the athletics houses foundation in 1920). By the 1960s, boys (other than prefects and those with sporting honours) had to wear a black jacket and either grey flannels or pinstripe trousers in the Autumn and Winter terms. Shortly after the start of the Summer term, an announcement would be made that henceforth, for the rest of the term, blazers (navy blue with a white embroidered DC in gothic script) and grey flannels would be worn, along with the option of boaters. The traditional cap which was balanced on the back of the head was to be worn when in uniform off school premises and (no doubt because of its precarious perch) boys would "cap" those to whom they would otherwise have raised their caps. "Capping" involved touching the college arms on the cap with the left hand. The 1960s saw the demise of caps and boaters and a reduction in the variety of blazers, as well as the end of shirts with separate collars.

== Co-curricular ==
=== Sport ===
When Arthur Herman Gilkes became Master, he adhered to Carver's belief that the physical organisation of the school should be based on the principle that as far as possible management should be in the hands of the boys. Therefore, he continued the tradition of the general running of games being entrusted to a Field Sports Board (sometimes referred to as the Field Sports Committee), composed of the "school captain, captains of cricket, football (rugby), gymnastics, the baths (swimming), fencing, fives, athletics sports, boxing and shooting". Gilkes had it that the only masters with authorised status with regards to games were the captain of the Rifle Corps, and treasurer of the Sports Board. By 1894 there no more masters on the Field Sports Committee. The Board at the time controlled the appointment of captains and had some say in the style of blazers that could be worn as uniform. It was the Field Sports Committee, for example, that governed the award of the college's most prestigious colours, the white blazer. The system today is very different with assistant masters now being in charge of games, and acting more as coaches.

Colours for sporting achievement were the first such colours to be established at the college (see School uniform and colours below). Originally colours consisted of blazers for the 1st and 2nd team of the major sports, rugby and cricket (as well as ties, caps and squares) and colours for minor sports, (not extending to a full blazer but blazer badges plus caps and ties). Caps were also available, such as for rugby, the pie shaped porker and more exclusive items such as the rare rugby honours cap, and the white blazer, only awarded on the recommendation of the Field Sports Committee with the essential requirement being that a boy be a member of both the Cricket 1st XI and the Rugby 1st XV and display prominence in a minor sport. Testament to the judgment of the committee are the careers of certain alumni who received this blazer such as Trevor Bailey the England cricket all-rounder, who was so awarded because he was also a distinguished squash player.

The college still divides sport into Major and Minor. The major sports have always included rugby and cricket in the Michaelmas and summer terms respectively and for many decades just these two were deemed as major. In the 20th century, field hockey became a major sport in the Lent term, having been introduced in 1953. Soccer, a minor sport since it was allowed in 1970, became of equal status to hockey in 2000. A raft of minor sports has also been recognised at the college for well over a century in many cases. Minor sports have included athletics from 1864; Fives from 1894 (effectively ended by the courts being destroyed by enemy bombs in the Second World War); shooting from 1878 (less applicable due to safety regulations and the loss of the .22 range); boxing from 1879 (abandoned in the 1960s but with martial arts now filling the void), tennis from 1880 (although banned during A H Gilkes' time); swimming from 1883 with the college being one of the first schools to erect a swimming pool; gymnastics from 1891; fencing (like boxing, saw a demise in the 1960s but still has a representative team); squash and water polo. The school also has teams for golf; badminton; basketball; croquet; cycling; skiing; table tennis and Rugby fives. The facilities, which include a sports centre complex, courts for most racquet sports, an athletic track, tennis courts, a swimming-pool and acres of playing fields, cater to almost all sporting requirements. The Cow corner position in Cricket is said to be named after a field at the College where cricket was played, a position that cows would congregate as there was little reason to place a fielder there.

=== Rowing ===
The school has an active rowing club called the Dulwich College Boat Club (a recent introduction in 1991 – the school now owns a boathouse on the River Thames). The club is affiliated to British Rowing (boat code DUL) and has produced four British champion crews at the 2001 British Rowing Championships, 2008 British Rowing Championships, 2014 National Schools' Regatta, and 2016 Schools' Head of the River Race

=== Rugby ===
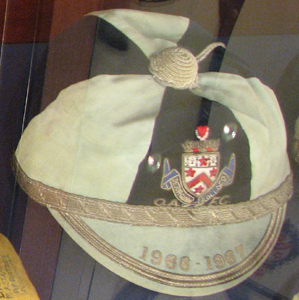
Example of the rugby honours cap, which, until around 1969, was awarded to only the very best players

Dulwich College began its rugby tradition with a 1–0 victory over City of London School in 1859, 12 years before the founding of the Rugby Football Union. Since that time the school has had upwards of 30 Old Alleynians play at full international level, with more playing at schoolboy international level, national reserve and professional club rugby as well as representatives for invitational sides such as the Barbarians.

Three British and Irish Lions have emerged from the college. 1909 featured an unbeaten first XV which contained five future internationals dubbed the "Famous Five". Between 2012 and 2014, Dulwich College won the Natwest Schools Cup (previously known as the Daily Mail Cup) three times in a row, then in 2017 secured an historic double, becoming the first ever team to win both the schools cup (in the years mentioned) and the Champions Trophy, the highest Tier of School Cup Rugby.

=== Combined Cadet Force ===
Dulwich College has a well-established Combined Cadet Force contingent that has been running since the organisation was founded in 1859. The cadets can choose between three sections: Royal Navy, Army and Royal Air Force, with most cadets joining in year 9. Since 2018 the contingent has accepted female cadets from James Allen's Girls' School. The contingent regularly conducts battlecraft trips, Air Experience Flights at RAF Benson and expeditions to the arctic or desert. The contingent are Gold medal winners in the Cadet Cambrian Patrol and have won the Guthrie Cup, London district shooting competition, and the cadet and young adult segments of the CCF and Inter-Services National First Aid Competitions. The contingent has won the Air Squadron Trophy Competition five times since its inception, first in 1998 in the inaugural year of the modern format of the competition, and most recently in 2020.

=== Scouts ===
Dulwich College has a Scout Group, 25th Camberwell, which provides scouting for those in Year 4 & 5 (Cubs) and Years 6-9 (Scouts). The Group is affiliated with an Explorer Unit, Dulwich Explorers, which provides scouting for those in Years 10-13. Founded in 1929, the Group is today run by a mixture of College staff, Old Alleynians, and parents.

=== Dulwich College Union ===
Dulwich College has a large union for clubs and societies containing over 50 societies. There is a wide range of clubs ranging from Rocketry to History and the college used to have a Chicken society in which boys tended to the college's chickens. The clubs, and Union, are run by boys in Year 12 and 13 and contribute to their The Duke of Edinburgh's Awards. Most of these clubs and societies have their own personalised ties.

==== Debating ====
Within the Dulwich College Union debating plays a large role. The Dulwich College society runs during the school terms but competes both nationally and internationally. The society runs from year 7 to 13 and has around 50 members. It has recently enjoyed great success, winning the Oxford Union Debating Competition in 2014, 2015 and 2016, the Cambridge Union Schools Debating Competition in 2014, 2015, and 2018, and the ESU (English Speaking Union) Schools Mace Debating Competition, also in 2014 and 2015. It has also represented Team England and competed internationally against other national teams, including in Texas, Singapore and Stuttgart. Dulwich College is, therefore, ranked as one of the top debating schools in the UK and one of the best in the world.

== School magazine ==
The Dulwich College school magazine is called the Alleynian, named after the school's founder Edward Alleyn. This magazine was first published in 1873, although the school's first magazine under the name the Dulwich College Magazine for School News and General Reading had been published in 1864 but only lasted for fourteen issues after its editor left for Cambridge University. The Alleynian was edited at one point by P. G. Wodehouse in his last year at the school.

== Notable alumni ==
Old boys of Dulwich College are called "Old Alleynians", after the founder of the school. This is often abbreviated to "O.A." as post-nominal letters in brackets in school publications or publications specifically concerning the school. The term should not be confused with "Alleyn's Old Boys" used for alumni of Alleyn's School. Current pupils of the school are known as Alleynians. Prior to around 1880, the terms "Alleynian" and "Old Alleynian" were not used and the pupils and ex-pupils were known as Dulwichians.

Notable Old Alleynians include Sir Ernest Shackleton, Sir P G Wodehouse, Raymond Chandler, Sir Edward George, Bob Monkhouse, Michael Ondaatje, Chiwetel Ejiofor, Nicholas Galitzine, Trevor Bailey, C. S. Forester, C. F. A. Voysey, Paul Sinha, and Nigel Farage.

== Headmastership of Dulwich College ==
The head master of Dulwich College is styled The Master of Dulwich College, as laid out in the 1882 scheme of the charity commissioners. This continued a tradition of the head of the College of God's Gift being called the master since its foundation in 1619. The foundation originally had a governing body consisting of a master, warden, four fellows, and six assistants made up of the two churchwardens of each of the three parishes of St Botolph's, Bishopsgate, of St Saviour's, Southwark, and of St Giles', Cripplegate. The master was most senior, followed by the warden and on vacancy of the mastership, the warden succeeded. By the 1857 Dulwich College Act the master, warden and fellows were pensioned and the governance of the foundation switched to a body of nineteen governors. However, the position of master continued as the title of the headmaster of the new upper school, with an undermaster as deputy. The 1882 act (as a result of the charity commissioners scheme) abolished the office of undermaster.

- Masters of Alleyn's College of God's Gift at Dulwich (both Upper and Lower Schools)
  - Alfred James Carver (appointed 1858; retired 1883)
- Masters of Dulwich College
  - James Edward Cowell Welldon (appointed 1883; retired 1885)
  - Arthur Herman Gilkes (appointed 1885; retired 1914)
  - George Smith (appointed 1914; retired 1928)
  - Walter Reynolds Booth (appointed 1928; retired 1941)
  - Christopher H. Gilkes (appointed 1941; died 1953)
  - C. Thomas (Deputy Master, took over the Mastership in 1953 for the year it took to find a permanent replacement)
  - Ronald Groves (appointed 1954; retired 1966)
  - Charles W. Lloyd (appointed 1966; retired 1975)
  - David A. Emms (appointed 1975; retired 1986)
  - Anthony C. F. Verity (appointed 1986; resigned 1995)
  - Christopher Field (The Deputy Master who became Acting Master during 1996.)
  - Graham G. Able (appointed 1997; retired 2009)
  - Joseph A. F. Spence (appointed 2009; retired 2024)
  - Robert Milne (appointed 2025)

In June 2024, the College announced the forthcoming retirement of Joseph Spence, and his replacement by Robert Milne, effective September 2025. However, Spence retired in September 2024 in the wake of an incident at a staff party. Fiona Angel was appointed as Acting Master for the subsequent year, having served in that position for two previous terms.

== Collections ==
The school has a very extensive archive, especially of material relating to drama and the arts, much of which is from Edward Alleyn's (the founder) own library. Apart from diaries kept by Alleyn and his partner Philip Henslowe are many other documents relating to the college and foundation. There are also 12 volumes of unpublished music by John Reading; two of the three volumes of the First Folio Shakespeare; a Mercator Atlas; first editions of poetry by John Donne, Edmund Spenser and Dryden; A Book of Hours from the fifteenth century and even a copy of the first book to be printed in London in 1480.

Other interesting artefacts held by the college include the James Caird, the lifeboat in which Ernest Shackleton made his intrepid voyage for survival to South Georgia from Elephant Island in 1916, as well as other items such as sledges from the earlier Nimrod expedition.

Above the fireplace in the Masters' Library are two panels depicting pietas (Duty) and liberalitas (Generosity) bought by Edward Alleyn in 1618 from Elizabeth I's state barge. They are reputed to have originally come from Francis Drake's Golden Hinde.

== Controversies ==
=== Sexual abuse allegations ===
In March 2021, a former pupil published an open letter to the Master, Joseph Spence, in which it was claimed that the school was a "breeding ground for sexual predators" and had an "established rape culture". The letter referenced hundreds of anonymous allegations of harassment or assault against former and current pupils both at the college and at neighbouring schools, as well as a failure of school administration to respond to allegations, and claimed that some Dulwich College pupils had a reputation for such behaviour, particularly among female students at nearby schools.

Spence said he "condemned unreservedly the alleged social and sexual misconduct" which he said was "distressing and entirely unacceptable".

=== Allegations of racism ===
In December 2025, twenty-five former pupils and one former member of teaching staff at Dulwich College signed an open letter published in The Guardian asking the Reform UK leader, Nigel Farage, to apologise for alleged racist and antisemitic behaviour during his time there. Other former pupils who knew Farage said that they do not recall the behaviour described. Farage responded to the allegations by stating: "I don't apologise for things that are complete made-up fantasies. Some of what I heard was just absolute nonsense by people with very obvious, if you looked, political motivation".

In 1981, an English teacher, Chloë Deakin, who did not know Farage personally, wrote to the master of the college, David Emms, asking him to reconsider his decision to appoint Farage as a prefect, citing his alleged racist views. Emms later said of Farage's behaviour: "It was naughtiness, not racism" and said that he was "proved right" to have made Farage a prefect.

In December 2025, The Guardian reported that in a private letter to a former pupil, headteacher Robert Milne wrote: "To protect the college's reputation in the long term, we have avoided making public statements in response to individual reports. This should not be interpreted as indifference: safeguarding the college's good name and upholding its values are of paramount importance to us."

== In popular culture ==
=== Artwork ===
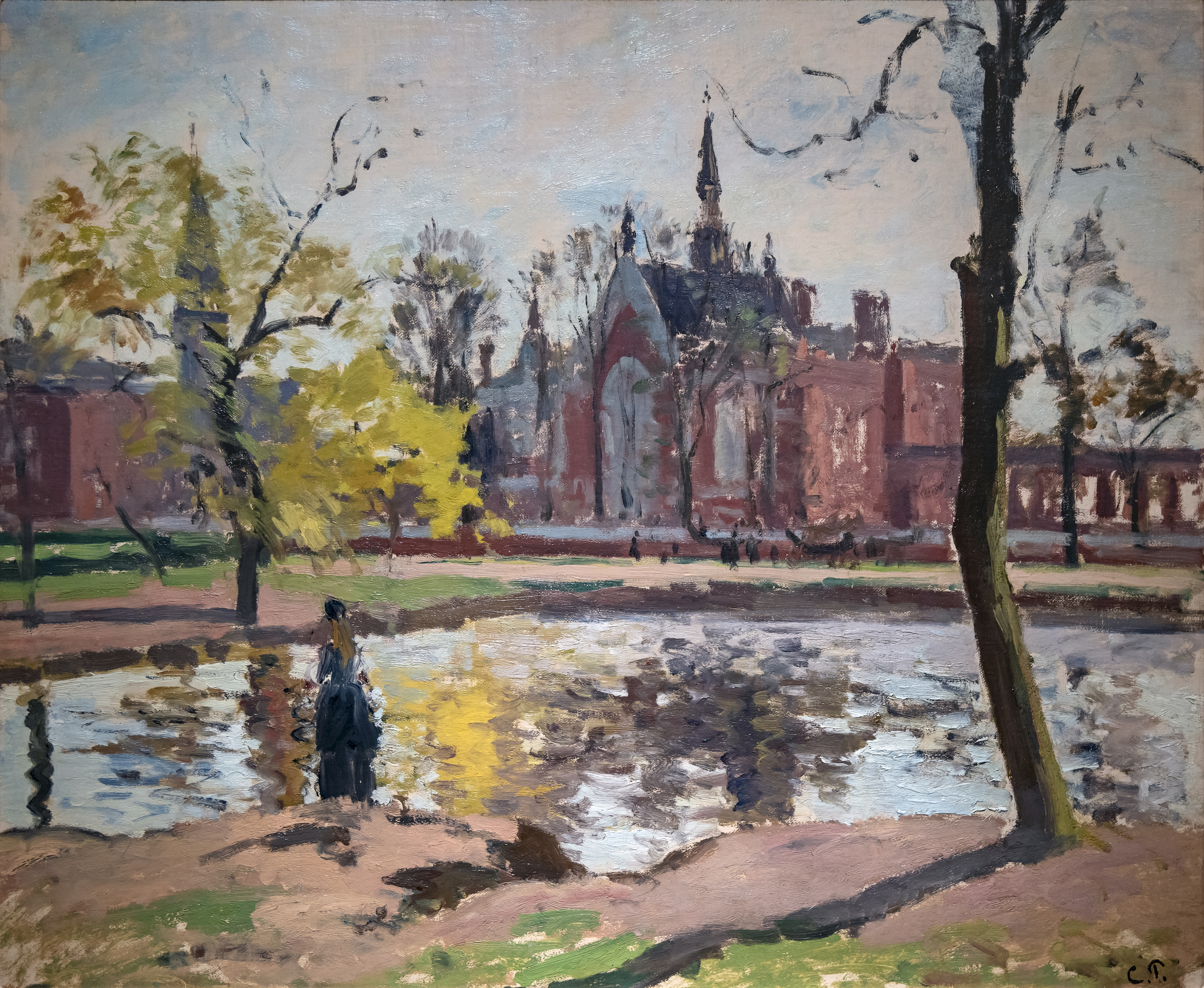
New College by Camille Pissarro

In 1870, the buildings of the New College were painted by the impressionist artist Camille Pissarro. Pissarro was at the time living in Upper Norwood, having fled from France at the time of the Franco-Prussian War, and was entranced by the London landscapes.

=== Film and television ===
The college grounds have been used as a filming location for various Hollywood and Bollywood films and TV programmes. They include Legally Blonde starring Reese Witherspoon, Lara Croft: Tomb Raider starring Angelina Jolie and '83 starring Ranveer Singh.

== See also ==
- Alleyn's College of God's Gift
- Dulwich International College
- Dulwich College Beijing
- Dulwich College Seoul
- Dulwich College Shanghai
- Dulwich College Singapore
- Dulwich College Suzhou
- Dulwich International High School Suzhou
- Dulwich International High School Zhuhai
