= Arthur Herman Gilkes =

English educationalist, author & vicar (1849-1922)

Arthur Herman Gilkes MA, (1849 – 13 September 1922) was a noted educationalist, author, and clergyman, and was Master of Dulwich College from 1885 to 1914.

His final years were spent as Vicar of St Mary Magdalen's Church, Oxford.

== Early life ==
Gilkes was born in Leominster, a son of William Gilkes, a chemist. He was educated at Shrewsbury School and went on to Christ Church, Oxford, from where he received a First Class Honours degree in Literae Humaniores in 1872, having achieved a first class in Mods in 1870. He was promoted to MA in 1885. On 19 May 1892 Gilkes married Millicent Mary Clarke, a daughter of Bennett Michell Clarke, and the sister of three brothers who attended Dulwich College. They had four sons, all of whom went to Dulwich College, and one daughter. One of his sons, Christopher, would later become Master of Dulwich College. Another son, Humphrey, became a doctor and was one of four soldiers to be awarded the Military Cross on four occasions in the First World War.

== Career ==
Having completed his education he went on to become Assistant Master from 1873 to 1885 at Shrewsbury School. From Shrewsbury he left for London to become the Master of Dulwich College from 1885 to 1914. The work he did at Dulwich College raised its reputation considerably, and he did this with only modest financial resources. During his tenure Dulwich became renowned for a number of areas notably including engineering and science. It was also A H Gilkes who first accepted London County Council scholars from elementary schools.

His connections to Dulwich went beyond those of an administrator and a teacher, for he also had extensive family ties with the school. All four of his sons attended, as did his three brothers-in-law, three nephews and his first cousin.

Following his retirement from Dulwich College in 1914 he became ordained in 1915 and acted as the Curate of St James Church, Bermondsey for a year. He was also Vicar of St Mary Magdalen's Church, Oxford from 1917.

== Publications ==
- 1880: School Lectures on Electra and Macbeth. London: Longmans, Green
- 1887: Boys and Masters (novel)
- 1894: The Thing that Hath Been. London: Longmans, Green (novel)
- 1897: Kallistratus. London: Longmans, Green (novel)
- 1903: The New Revolution. London: Longmans, Green
- 1904: A Dialogue. London: Longmans, Green (in form of a conversation about Socrates between four bishops and Mr. Smith)
- 1905: A Day at Dulwich London: Longmans, Green
- 1916 Four Sons. Dulwich: G. A. Symcox (novel)

Academic offices
Preceded by James Welldon	Master of Dulwich College; 1885–1914	Succeeded by George Smith
