= Charles W. Lloyd =

Charles William Lloyd (23 September 1915 – February 1999) was an educationalist and was Headmaster of Alleyn's School from 1963 to 1966 and then Master of Dulwich College from 1967 to 1975.

== Early life ==
He was born the son of Charles and Frances Ellen Lloyd and grew up in London. He was educated at St Olave's Grammar School and went on to Emmanuel College, Cambridge. In 1939 he married Doris Ethel Baker with whom he had one son and two daughters.

== Career ==
His first teaching role was as an Assistant Master at Buckhurst Hill School, a post he held from 1938 to 1940. His teaching was interrupted by the Second World War in which he served with the Royal Artillery. His return to teaching was in 1946 when he became an Assistant Master at Gresham's School and in 1951 he was given his first headmastership at Hutton Grammar School near Preston, Lancashire, leaving in 1963. Lloyd's first post with the foundation of Alleyn's College of God's Gift was as Headmaster of Alleyn's School which he took up in 1963. He resigned from this position in 1966 in order to take up the position of Master at Dulwich College, which he began in 1967. During his time at Dulwich College he also became a JP for Inner London (in 1970) and a Trustee of the National Maritime Museum in 1974, a position he held until 1986. He retired as Master of Dulwich College in 1975.

Academic offices
Preceded by S. R. Hudson	Headmaster of Alleyn's School; 1963–1966	Succeeded by J. L. Fanner
Preceded by Ronald Groves	Master of Dulwich College; 1967–1975	Succeeded by David Emms
