= Charles Gordon Timms =

MC & 3 Bars, plus British Lions international rugby union player

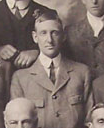
- Timms with the British Isles team in 1910
- Born: 1884; Winchelsea, Victoria, Australia
- Died: 1958 (aged 73–74)
- Relatives: Alec Boswell Timms (brother)
- Military career
- Allegiance: United Kingdom
- Branch: British Army
- Service years: 1914 – c.1919 1939
- Rank: Captain
- Unit: Royal Army Medical Corps
- Conflicts: First World War
- Awards: Officer of the Order of the British Empire; Military Cross & Three Bars

Charles Gordon Timms OBE, MC & Three Bars (1884–1958) was a doctor, decorated officer in the British Army, and rugby union player who played for the Lions. He was one of the minority of rugby players who was never capped for a home nation to play for the Lions. He is also one of four soldiers to have been awarded the Military Cross four times, all in the First World War.

Timms was born at Mount Hesse Station, near Winchelsea, Victoria, in Australia. His father owned the sheep farm. Like his brother Alec, he was educated at Geelong College – where he played cricket and Australian rules football – and then travelled to Scotland to study medicine at the University of Edinburgh, where he played for the Edinburgh University club. Although he never played for the Scotland team, he was one of three players from Scotland on the 1910 British Lions tour to South Africa, playing as a centre three-quarter.

After he qualified as a doctor, Timms worked in London. He joined the British Army after the outbreak of the First World War, being commissioned as a temporary lieutenant in the Royal Army Medical Corps on 10 October 1914. He served in France as medical officer of the 7th Battalion of the Royal Fusiliers from September 1915, and was promoted to temporary captain on 10 October 1915. He was awarded the Military Cross (MC) on four occasions, all for attending to wounded men under heavy fire.

The first MC was awarded on 18 July 1917, with a first Bar on 26 July 1918, a second Bar on 11 January 1919, A third Bar was gazetted on 1 February 1919 for actions near Cambrai in October 1918:

For conspicuous gallantry and devotion to duty near Cambrai on 1 October 1918, during a severe enemy barrage when his C.O. was wounded. He at once took up a squad of stretcher-bearers into the barrage to the rescue, tending his wounds and seeing that he was conveyed to a place of safety.

He joined the Colonial Medical Service after the war, serving in Uganda in 1922, and then in British Somaliland. He was appointed an Officer of the Order of the British Empire in the 1936 Birthday Honours for his service in Somaliland. He rejoined the Royal Army Medical Corps in 1939, with the rank of lieutenant.

== See also ==
- Three other British soldiers to be awarded the MC and three bars: Francis Wallington, Percy Bentley, Humphrey Arthur Gilkes
