= Christopher H. Gilkes =

English educationalist

Christopher Herman Gilkes (1898 – 2 September 1953) was a noted educationalist and was Master of Dulwich College, United Kingdom, from 1941 to his death in 1953.

== Early life ==
He was born the son of the Reverend Arthur Herman Gilkes who had also been the Master of Dulwich College. Christopher Gilkes was educated at Dulwich College whilst his father was its Master and whilst at the school was Captain of the school, captain of boxing, a member of the 1st XV Rugby Union side and editor of the school's magazine. He then went to Trinity College, Oxford on a classical scholarship. His brother Humphrey Arthur Gilkes became a doctor, and was one of four soldiers to be awarded the Military Cross on four occasions in the First World War.

== Career ==
Having completed his education he went on to become Assistant Master from 1922 to 1928 at Uppingham School under another Old Alleynian, R H Owen. From there moved to Stockport Grammar School where he was Headmaster from 1929 to 1941.

== Dulwich College ==
He joined Dulwich College in 1941 during the Second World War and led the school through this traumatic period. His bravery and leadership has been cited as unfailing and unshakeable during this time, as the school suffered much damage during bombing raids. As well as suffering ancillary damage from nearby detonations, the school was hit directly, destroying a number of buildings including the Fives and Squash courts, most of the science block and severely damaging the main school buildings as well.

When Gilkes took over, the school's finances were in need of improvement and part of the reason for Gilkes' appointment was to provide a 'boldness and imagination' necessary to achieve this. The greatest step towards this was Gilkes' agreement to house boys who were participating in a War Office sponsored scheme under which the School of Oriental and African Studies (SOAS) would provide a crash course in Turkish, Persian, Chinese and Japanese in order to ensure the three armed services had men who could speak eastern languages. The boys on the scheme, termed The Oriental Scholars would study at SOAS in the morning and then return to Dulwich College where they would do more general work. Gilkes' part in this was later lauded by Sir Ralph Lilley Turner, who was the Director of SOAS at the time, as a great contribution to the war effort.

=== The Dulwich Experiment ===
Prior to his appointment, the school had had a decline in academic reputation and an urgent need was emphasised to Gilkes to raise the academic standard. Contemporaneously, the school's finances were not in good shape, as discussed, and there were discussions as to whether to hand the school to the London County Council to become a state school. The Governors were intent on the school remaining independent. Gilkes addressed the academic side by taking immediate advantage of the provisions of the Education Act 1944. One of the terms of this landmark Act was that a common entrance exam should be implemented, and any child who passed the exam qualified for a free place at a secondary school, fees being paid by the local authority. Gilkes made it clear to the London County Council, that he wanted the college to take advantage of the scheme. Thus was born the Dulwich Experiment. Both the financial and academic fortunes of the school would benefit from this and Gilkes also made clear to the school's Alleyn Club the following: "It is now possible to choose as our entrants the best boys, quite regardless of their father's income". Dulwich College had already had a good reputation for having a steady intake of LCC scholars but under Gilkes' Dulwich Experiment the scale became massive. Gilkes also managed to ensure that not only was the common entrance exam to be passed but also the college's own papers. This gave Gilkes' free choice from among the candidates. It also lowered the main age of entry at Dulwich College from thirteen to eleven, because this was the age at which the 1944 Act stipulated the change from primary to secondary education took place. Another effect of the Experiment was a huge increase in numbers at the school, going from less than seven hundred to more than one thousand.

=== Rebuilding ===
Partially, Gilkes' insistence on maintaining as normal a school life as possible during the war meant that Dulwich College became attractive to parents who returned to London during the early 1940s when there had been a lull in bombing. After the war, restrictions that had been placed on the Dulwich Estates Governors as to the size of the school's endowment were partially lifted to allow rebuilding to take place.

=== Other areas ===
The school's musical and drama contributions also flourished under Gilkes, and indeed the House Drama Competition, which still runs today, was inaugurated in 1948 under Gilkes. The school's various societies also began to proliferate.

=== Death ===
In the autumn of 1953, Gilkes died of a heart attack whilst on holiday with his family. He had known that he was suffering from what was diagnosed as congenital malignant hypertension for at least three years and that it would limit his lifespan. However, he had not told any of his staff. This unfortunately meant that he did not see the full fruits of his work at the school. It was later said by a former classics master of the school that "it was the vigour, often maybe ruthless vigour, of Gilkes that saved Dulwich."

== Personal life ==
Christopher Gilkes married Kathleen Josephine Trinidad in 1939 with whom he had two sons and a daughter.

Academic offices
Preceded by Walter Reynolds Booth	Master of Dulwich College; 1941–1953	Succeeded by The Deputy Master, C. Thomas, was Acting Master for 12 months following the death of Gilkes, then Ronald Groves
