= Gilks =

Gilks is a surname. Notable people with the surname may include:

- Alfred Gilks (1891–1970), cinematographer
- Bob Gilks (1864–1944), baseball player
- Gillian Gilks (born 1950), badminton player
- Martin Gilks (1965–2006), musician
- Matthew Gilks (born 1982), football player

== See also ==
- Gilkes
