= Dulwich College Shanghai Pudong =

International school in Shanghai, China

Coordinates: 31.2384°N 121.5852°E

- 上海浦东德威外籍人员子女学校
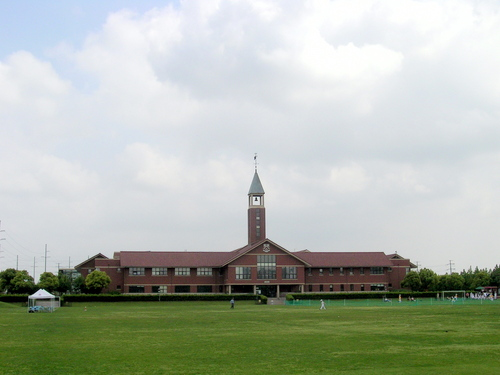

Location
- 266 Lan'An Road; Jinqiao, Pudong, Shanghai, 201206; China

Information
- Type: Private international school
- Motto: Detur Pons Mundo (Building Bridges to the World)
- Established: 22 July 2003; 22 years ago
- Founders: Fraser White and Karen Yung
- Headmaster: Garry Russell
- Staff: 170+
- Gender: Co-educational
- Age: 2 to 18
- Enrollment: 1600+ (approx.)
- Houses: Day Houses: 4 Curie; Shackleton; Wing; Maathai
- Colours: Navy blue, red, black and white
- Website: shanghai-pudong.dulwich.org

Dulwich College Shanghai Pudong
- Simplified Chinese: 上海浦东德威外籍人员子女学校
- Traditional Chinese: 上海浦東德威外籍人員子女學校
- Literal meaning: Shanghai Pudong Dulwich School for Children of Foreign Personnel
Transcriptions
Standard Mandarin
- Hanyu Pinyin: Shànghǎi Pǔdōng Déwēi Wàijí Rényuán Zǐnǚ Xuéxiào

Dulwich College Shanghai Pudong (上海浦东德威外籍人员子女学校) is a private K-12 school for children of foreign personnel, located in Pudong, Shanghai, China. The campus was opened in 2003, and is owned and operated by Education in Motion, a British company. Students studying in the school learn English, and from Year 1 onwards, Mandarin Chinese.

== See also ==
- Dulwich College
- Dulwich College Singapore
- Dulwich College Beijing
- Dulwich College Suzhou
- Dulwich International High School Suzhou
- Dulwich International High School Zhuhai
