= Dulwich College Suzhou =

Coordinates: 31°18.4118′N 120°46.6627′E

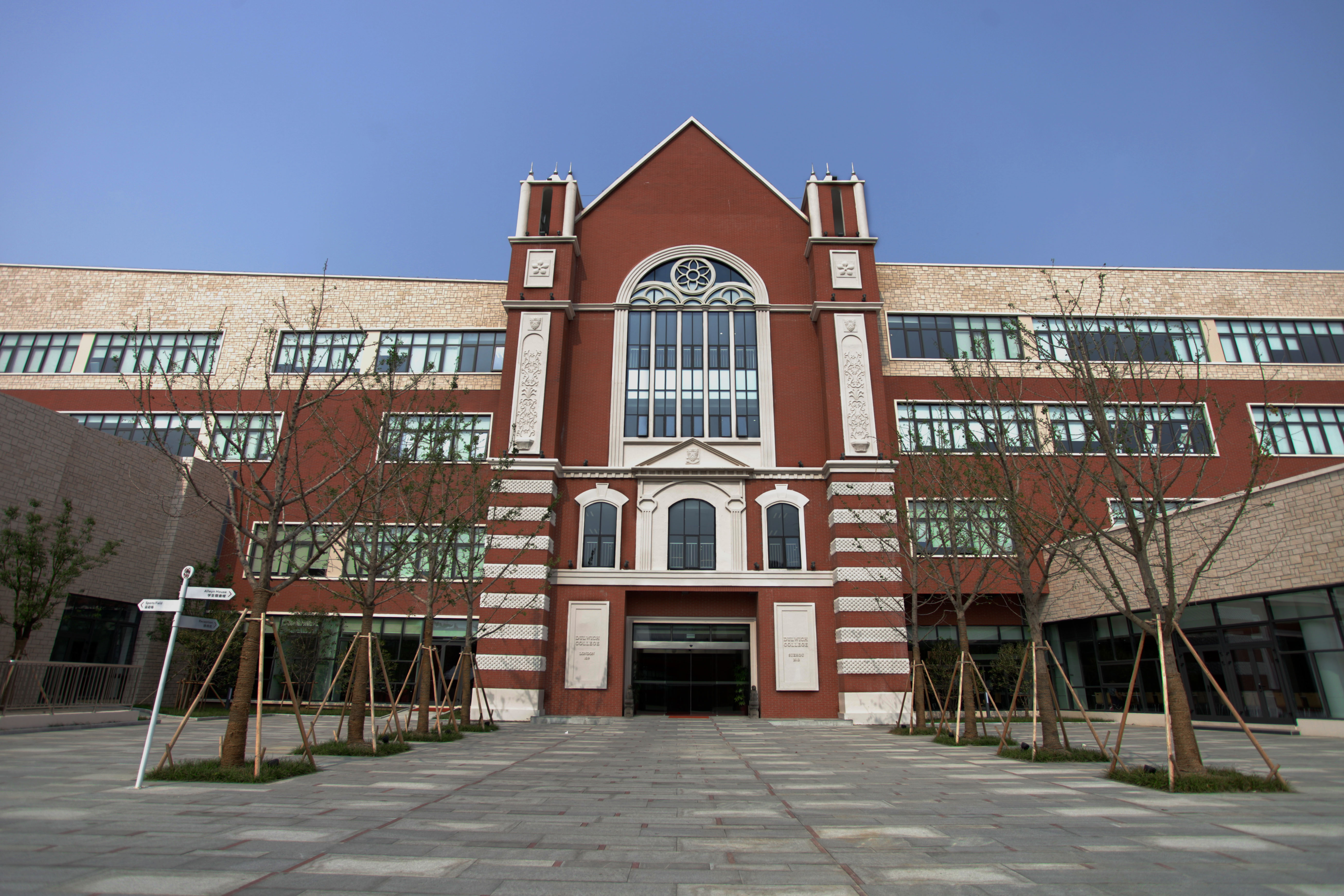
- Junior School Building Senior School Building The School Campus
- SIP Suzhou, Jiangsu,, 215000; China

Information
- Type: Independent school
- Motto: Detur Pons Mundo ("Building Bridges to the World")
- Established: 2007
- Headmaster: David Massiah
- Staff: 200
- Gender: Boys and girls
- Age: 2 to 18
- Enrolment: 900 (approx.)
- Houses: 4
- Colours: Blue, Red, White
- Sports: Acamis Blue Division
- Website: https://suzhou.dulwich.org/

Dulwich College Suzhou (DCSZ; Chinese: 苏州德威外籍人员子女学校; pinyin: Sūzhōu Déwēi Wàijí Rényuán Zǐnǚ Xuéxiào) is a private international school located in Suzhou Industrial Park, Suzhou, China. The school has approximately 900 students from age 2 to 18 (Early Learning 1 to Year 13).

The college joined the Dulwich College International (DCI) network of schools in 2007.

== The College ==
Dulwich College Suzhou opened in August 2007. The primary teaching language is English, with a dual language approach in Mandarin and English in kindergarten. From kindergarten to Year 9 students follow the National Curriculum for England, enhanced for international needs. In Year 10 students begin the two-year International GCSE syllabus followed by the International Baccalaureate Diploma Programme in Years 12 and 13.

=== DUCKS ===
The Dulwich Kindergarten, known as DUCKS, caters to the youngest students from Early Learning 1 to Year 2 (age 2 to 7 years).

=== Junior School ===
Junior School caters for students from ages 7 to 11.

=== Senior School ===
Senior School includes students from ages 11 to 18 where students follow the IGCSE syllabus and International Baccalaureate Programme (IBDP).

== Headmastership and Administration ==
Since opening, the college has been led by several headmasters.

Years active	Name
2007 - 2012	Nicholas Magnus
2012 - 2017	John Todd
2017 - 2019	Stuart Bridge
2019 - 2022	Mike O'Connor
2022–present	David Massiah

Nicholas Cassey is Head of Junior School as of the 2024/2025 academic year and Shirley Wan is Head of Ducks (Early Years). Mark Jones is the current Head of Senior School.

The current administration of the Senior School goes as follows:

Administration of the Senior School
Name	Role
Mark Jones	Head of Senior School
Eleanor Chafer	Deputy Head of Senior School (Pastoral)
Betty Lutterodt	Deputy Head of Senior School (Academic)

== Reception ==
Dulwich College Suzhou is classified as a Tier I international school in China and excels academically with its unique holistic education system. They have a strong sports culture, with many teams that win competitions in the local ACAMIC league. Overall, parents generally assign high satisfaction with the school.

However, Dulwich College Suzhou has been embroiled in problems in the 2023/2024 academic year. Some complaints revolve around the downgrade of teaching attributed to the inability to attract qualified teachers due to the COVID-19 pandemic. Furthermore, both the student body and teacher population have tremendously dwindled due to the pandemic, and student diversity has decreased following an increased number of local Chinese students enrolling. In addition, there are reportedly exclusive cliques of different nationalities, of which makes certain students feel isolated.

== See also ==
- Dulwich College Beijing
- Dulwich College
- Dulwich College Singapore
- Dulwich College Shanghai
- Dulwich International High School Suzhou
