= Dulwich College Beijing =

- 北京德威英国国际学校
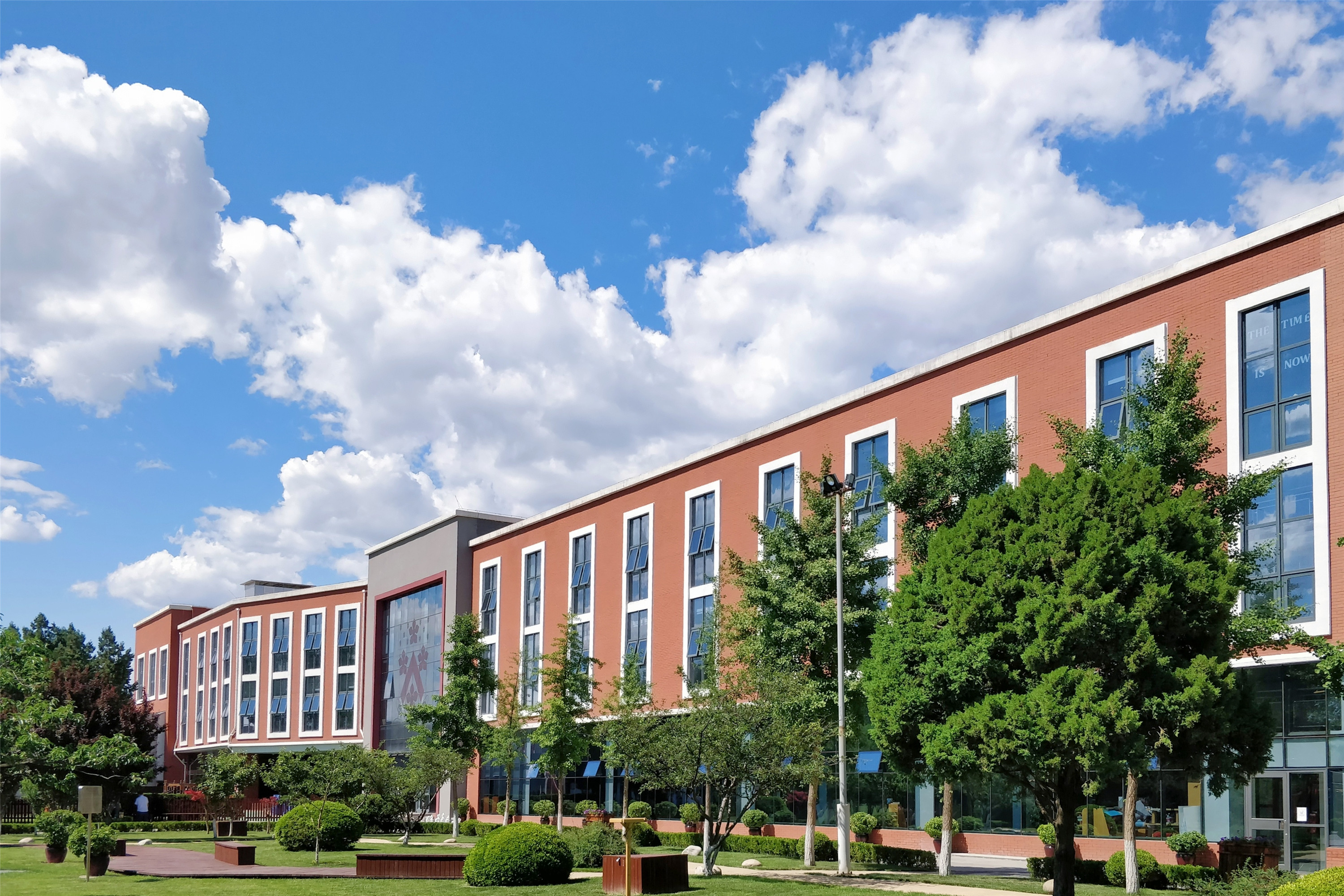

Location
- 89 Capital Airport Road, Shunyi District; Beijing, 101300; China

Information
- Type: Private, Day School
- Motto: Detur Pons Mundo (Building Bridges to the World)
- Established: 2005
- Headmaster: Dr Cameron Pyke
- Faculty: 223
- Years offered: DUCKS-Year 13
- Gender: Co-ed
- Age range: 3-18
- Enrollment: 1600+
- Language: English
- Houses: Alleyn (Purple), Johnson (Blue), Owens (Orange), Soong (Red), Wodehouse (Green)
- Colors: Black, Red, White
- Mascot: Lions
- Website: https://beijing.dulwich.org

Dulwich College Beijing (DCB; 北京德威英国国际学校) is a private international day school in Shunyi District, Beijing, China. Founded in 2005, it is a school for children of foreign personnel and part of the Dulwich College International network.

DCB follows the English National Curriculum and offers IGCSE, IB Diploma Programme, and A-level qualifications.

== History ==
Dulwich College Beijing opened in 2005 as the second school in the Dulwich College International network. Its network has historical links to Dulwich College in London, founded in 1619.

In 2018, the campus underwent an approximately 6,000-square-metre renovation and extension, including changes to early-years facilities, libraries, and shared spaces. Further renovations were announced in 2025, including upgrades to early-years classrooms and student common areas.

== Academics ==
DCB is divided into Dulwich College Kindergarten School (DUCKS), Junior School, and Senior School. DUCKS serves children aged two to seven, Junior School serves ages seven to eleven, and Senior School serves ages eleven to eighteen.

Students follow an English-curriculum programme through Key Stages 1 to 3, study IGCSE courses in Years 10 and 11, and progress to either the IB Diploma Programme or A levels in Years 12 and 13.

DCB was re-accredited by the Council of International Schools in 2022.

== Campus ==
The campus includes sports halls, sports domes, tennis courts, football and rugby pitches, music and art facilities, and libraries. Its theatres include the Wodehouse Theatre, Edward Alleyn Theatre, and two black-box theatres.

== Student life ==
Students and staff are assigned to one of five houses: Alleyn, Johnson, Owens, Soong, and Wodehouse. The houses are named after Edward Alleyn, Amy Johnson, Jesse Owens, Soong Ching-ling, and P. G. Wodehouse, respectively. The house system forms part of the school's pastoral and student-leadership structure.

Students from Nursery through Year 11 wear school uniform; students in Years 12 and 13 follow a business-dress code.

DCB offers co-curricular activities in sport, music, drama, visual arts, debate, coding, and Model United Nations. Sports teams compete in the International Schools Athletic Conference (ISAC), the Association of China and Mongolia International Schools (ACAMIS), and the Federation of British International Schools in Asia (FOBISIA).

== Rankings ==
In the 2020 Hurun Education Top International Schools in China ranking, the school was ranked first among international schools in Beijing. In 2021, Hurun Education ranked it first among schools in China open only to non-Chinese passport holders.

In 2015, China Daily ranked Dulwich College Beijing fourth in its list of Beijing's most expensive private schools.

== See also ==
- Education in Beijing
- Britons in China
- List of international schools

Affiliated Dulwich schools:

- Dulwich College
- Dulwich College Singapore
- Dulwich College Shanghai Pudong
- Dulwich College Shanghai Puxi
- Dulwich College Suzhou
- Dulwich International High School Suzhou
- Dulwich International High School Zhuhai

Other British schools in Beijing:

- Harrow International School of Beijing
- British School of Beijing
