= Dulwich College Seoul =

British international school in Seoul, South Korea

Coordinates: 37.5041°N 126.9953°E

- 덜위치칼리지서울영국학교

Information
- Other name: DCSL
- Type: Co-educational • Private • Day
- Motto: Detur Pons Mundo
- Established: 2010
- Head of school: Alison Derbyshire
- Staff: 200
- Years offered: Reception - Year 13
- Age: 3 to 18
- Enrollment: 760~
- Houses: Shackleton, Alleyn, Sejong, Seacole
- Colors: Red, White, Yellow, Black
- Mascot: Leopards
- Affiliation: EiM (Education in Motion)

Dulwich College Seoul (DCSL; Korean: 덜위치칼리지서울영국학교) is a British international school in Banpo-dong, Seocho District, Seoul, South Korea. Affiliated with Dulwich College, it serves students from nursery (age 3) to Year 13 (age 18; US Grade 12). It was established in 2010, opening on 20 August that year. There are currently over 760 students and 200 staff in the school, growing every year to match their new enrollment capacity of 805 students.

== Academics ==
=== Curriculum ===
English is primary language of instruction. From Reception to Year 6 (DUCKS & Junior School), the curriculum is largely based off the English National Curriculum (EYFS to Key Stage 2). In the Middle School, students transition to subject-specialist teachers based on KS3 before selecting a two-year IGCSE course load for Years 10 and 11. All students then study the IB Diploma Program, choosing six subjects alongside the IB Core.

The college has a strong emphasis on second languages, offering Mandarin from Year 1 and also Korean, Spanish, and French in later years. EAL support is also offered.

=== Reputation and rankings ===
Dulwich is considered one of the best IB schools in Korea (ranked first in 2024) while consistently being the best in Seoul based on scores. The college has consistently achieved an average of over 36 in the IBDP since 2024.

== Campus ==
Dulwich is adjacent to Gangnam, and is also in proximity to Seorae Village and Hannam-dong. The Shinbampo subway station is also a two-minute walk from campus and is one stop away from the Express Bus Terminal.

The building itself has undergone many renovations. After breaking ground in October 2009, the college opened in September 2010 with three floors and one basement level. Since its founding, regular summer refurbishments have also been carried out.

=== Previous Summer Works (2010-2023) ===
Throughout the years, various renovations have taken place. This includes the addition of another 2 floors, another basement level, and an auditorium and music wing. In addition, several interior refurbishments have taken place to improve the campus from 2017 to 2023, including the installment of new outdoor play areas, the addition of a cross-floor slide connecting the basement and foyer (known as the "Dulwich Drop"), and other various aesthetic improvements. Both the school's Junior, Senior School, and IB libraries/hubs have also won the AIA Design Awards in 2021 and 2024, respectively.

=== Summer 2025 Campus Enhancements ===
Ahead of the 2025-26 school year and its 15th Anniversary, the college made three major improvements. This includes a fully renovated basement level, now renamed 1619 (after Dulwich College London's founding year), which features a brighter and more open dining hall, greenery, and a cafe space. The DUCKS wing was also completely refreshed as part of a broader school-wide redevelopment project, with new classrooms and a dedicated entrance. The addition of a new theater completed the works, called the Alleyn Theater.

The introduction of these improvements also coincided with the announcement of further, more drastic campus renovations across the next three years.

=== Summer 2026 Works ===
Following a March 2026 announcement, the college launched a summer and Term 1 renovation and extension project on campus. Among these developments includes the erection of a clock tower, a feature of all other Dulwich Colleges. The construction of a new East Wing is also underway, connected the main building to the gymnasium and swimming pool building. All art classrooms will be relocated to new third floor art studios, and there is also a new dance/multi purpose studio, training gym, and new outdoor spaces. The old art spaces were also transformed into a new SE21 Makerspace Hub on the second floor. The fifth floor has also been extended to add a new Senior School Innovation Hub, hosting Computer Science and STEM classes.

== College Leadership Team ==
The school has had four Heads of College: Daryl Orchard (2010–2014), Graeme Salt (2014–2020), Gudmundur Hegner Jonsson (2020–2024) and Alison Derbyshire (2024-).

The current head of Junior School and DUCKS is Jane Smith (2018-) and the current head of Senior School is Suzanne Pugh (2022-). After Derbyshire's arrival in 2024, this marked the first time Dulwich was led by an all-female leadership team.

== Finances ==
Tuition for the 2025-26 academic year ranges from KRW 42,740,000 to KRW 47,940,000, varying by year group. There are several other separate fees, including for school lunch, uniform, application, and busing. This makes it the second-most expensive school in Seoul proper.
