= Dulwich College Singapore =

Location
- 71 Bukit Batok West Avenue 8 Singapore 658966; Singapore; 1.345299°N 103.74211°E

Information
- Type: Independent, international school
- Established: 2014
- Founder: Edward Alleyn
- Headmaster: David Ingram
- Teaching staff: 300
- Age: 2 to 18
- Enrollment: 2,500 (2020)
- Capacity: 2,500
- Average class size: 22
- Houses: Earhart, Lee, Mandela and Shackleton
- Accreditation: EduTrust
- Tuition: SGD 20,270 - 56,220 (USD 15096 - 41869) (2025-2026)
- Affiliation: FOBISIA, IB World Schools
- Chief Executive Officer: Fraser White
- Website: https://singapore.dulwich.org/

Dulwich College Singapore is a British private school located in Singapore, and is associated with Dulwich College. Founded in 2014, the College is headed by David Ingram, who started from August 2025, preceded by Nick Magnus, MBE, who was head of college since its opening.

As a branch of Dulwich College International, it offers a comprehensive programme for students aged 2 to 18 and is separated into three schools: DUCKS, Junior School, and Senior School.

== Academics ==
Students from ages 2 to 7 are taught bilingually in English and Chinese. Daily Chinese classes are conducted for students from years 3 to 8 (aged 8 to 13).

== Key facilities ==
In August 2018, a performing arts centre at the college was completed, which includes a 742-seat theatre and a pipe organ, which is the second-largest in Singapore, two black box theatres and suites of music and art rooms.

Sports facilities at the college include three swimming pools, a multi-purpose pitch, two gymnasiums, a dance studio, a fitness centre, and cricket nets.

An IB centre was completed in November of 2023 including quiet study areas and a large common room.

Junior school students are initially taught a string instrument, then later offered an opportunity to change to a wind or brass instrument.

== See also ==
- Dulwich College Beijing
- Dulwich College
- Dulwich College Suzhou
- Dulwich College Shanghai
- Dulwich College Seoul
- Dulwich College Puxi
- Dulwich College Bangkok
