= Military Cross =

British military decoration

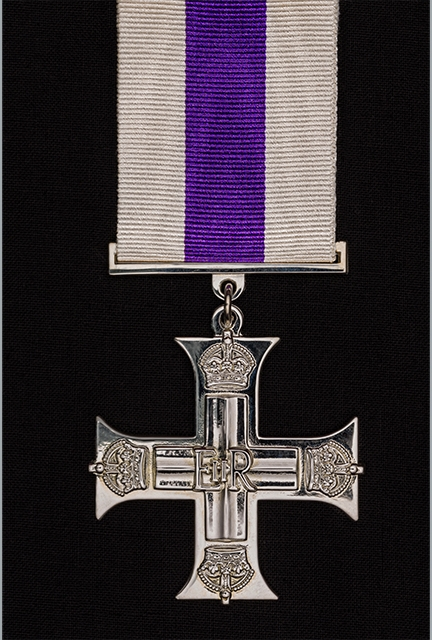
- Military Cross
- Type: Military decoration
- Awarded for: ... gallantry during active operations against the enemy.
- Description: Obverse: Straight armed silver cross, Royal Cypher in centre Reverse: plain
- Presented by: United Kingdom and Commonwealth
- Eligibility: British, (and formerly) Commonwealth and allied forces
- Status: Active
- Established: 28 December 1914
- First award: 1 January 1915 to 98 officers and warrant officers.

Highlights
- Total: Including further awards: George V: c. 43,500; George VI: over 11,500; Elizabeth II: c. 750; Charles III: 0
- Total recipients: 52,000+
- Military Cross ribbon: without bar, and with one and two bars

Order of Wear
- Next (higher): Conspicuous Gallantry Cross
- Next (lower): Distinguished Flying Cross
- Related: Military Medal

The Military Cross (MC) is the third-level (second-level until 1993) military decoration awarded to officers and (since 1993) other ranks of the British Armed Forces, and formerly awarded to officers of other Commonwealth countries.

The MC is granted in recognition of "an act or acts of exemplary gallantry during active operations against the enemy on land" to all members of the British Armed Forces of any rank. In 1979, Queen Elizabeth II approved a proposal that a number of awards, including the Military Cross, could be recommended posthumously.

== History ==
The award was created on 28 December 1914 for commissioned officers of the substantive rank of captain or below and for warrant officers. The first 98 awards were gazetted on 1 January 1915, to 71 officers, and 27 warrant officers. Although posthumous recommendations for the Military Cross were unavailable until 1979, the first awards included seven posthumous awards, with the word 'deceased' after the name of the recipient, from recommendations that had been raised before the recipients died of wounds or died from other causes.

Awards are announced in The London Gazette, apart from most honorary awards to allied forces in keeping with the usual practice not to gazette awards to foreigners.

From August 1916, recipients of the Cross were entitled to use the post-nominal letters MC, and bars could be awarded for further acts of gallantry meriting the award, with a silver rosette worn on the ribbon when worn alone to denote the award of each bar.

From September 1916, members of the Royal Naval Division, who served alongside the Army on the Western Front, were made eligible for military decorations, including the Military Cross, for the war's duration. Naval officers serving with the division received 140 MCs and eight second award bars.

In June 1917, eligibility was extended to temporary majors, not above the substantive rank of captain. Substantive majors were made eligible in 1953.

In 1931, the award was extended to equivalent ranks in the Royal Air Force for actions on the ground.

After the Second World War, most Commonwealth countries created their own honours system and no longer recommended British awards. The last Military Cross awards for the Canadian Army were for Korea. The last four Australian Army Military Cross awards were promulgated in The London Gazette on 1 September 1972 for Vietnam as was the last New Zealand Army Military Cross award, which was promulgated on 25 September 1970. Canada, Australia and New Zealand have now created their own gallantry awards under their own honours systems.

Since the 1993 review of the honours system, as part of the drive to remove distinctions of rank in awards for bravery the Military Medal, formerly the third-level decoration for other ranks, was discontinued. The MC is now the third-level award for all ranks of the British Armed Forces for "exemplary gallantry" on land, not to the standard required to receive the Victoria Cross (for "the most conspicuous bravery") or the Conspicuous Gallantry Cross.

== Description ==
The Military Cross was designed by Henry Farnham Burke, while its ribbon was created by Victoria Ponsonby, Baroness Sysonby.

In the Medal Yearbook 2015 it is described as follows:

- 46 mm maximum height, 44 mm maximum width.
- Ornamental silver cross with straight arms terminating in broad finials, suspended from a plain suspension bar.
- Obverse decorated with imperial crowns, with the Royal Cypher in centre.
- Reverse is plain. From 1938 until 1957 the year of award was engraved on lower limb of cross, and since 1984 it has been awarded named to the recipient.
- The ribbon width is 32 mm and consists of three equal vertical moire stripes of white, purple, and white.
- Ribbon bar denoting a further award is plain silver, with a crown in the centre.

== Recipients ==
=== Numbers awarded ===
Since 1914, over 52,000 Military Crosses and 3,714 bars have been awarded. The dates below reflect the relevant London Gazette entries:

Period		Medals	1st bar	2nd bar	3rd bar	Honorary MCs	Honorary MC bars
World War I	1914–20	37,104	2,984	169	4	2,909	–
Inter–War	1920–39	349	31	–	–	–	–
World War II	1939–46	10,386	482	24	–	438	3
Post–War	1947–79	643	20	–	–	–	–
Total	1914–79	48,482	3,517	193	4	3,347	3

In addition, approximately 375 MCs have been awarded since 1979, including awards for Northern Ireland, the Falklands, and the wars in the Persian Gulf, Iraq, and Afghanistan.

The above table includes awards to the Dominions:

- In all, 3,727 Military Crosses have been awarded to those serving with Canadian forces, including 324 first bars and 18 second bars.
- A total of 2,930 were awarded to Australians, in addition to 188 first bars and four second bars. Of these, 2,403 MCs, 170 first Bars and four second Bars were for World War I.
- Over 500 MCs were awarded to New Zealanders during World War I and over 250 in World War II. The most recent awards were for service in Vietnam.
- The honorary MC awards were made to servicemen from fifteen Allied countries in World War I, and nine in World War II.

=== Notable awards ===
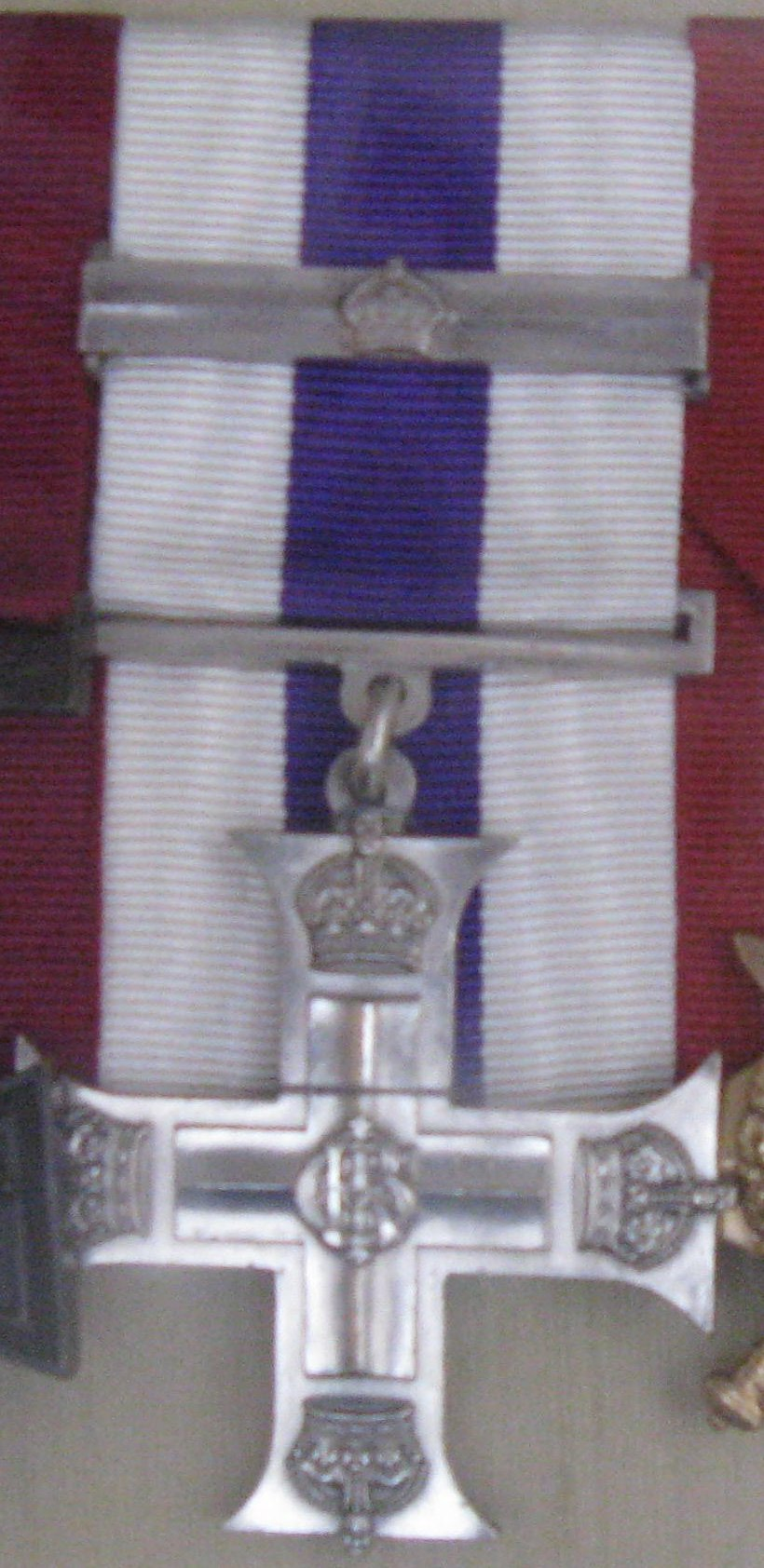
Albert Jacka's MC and bar

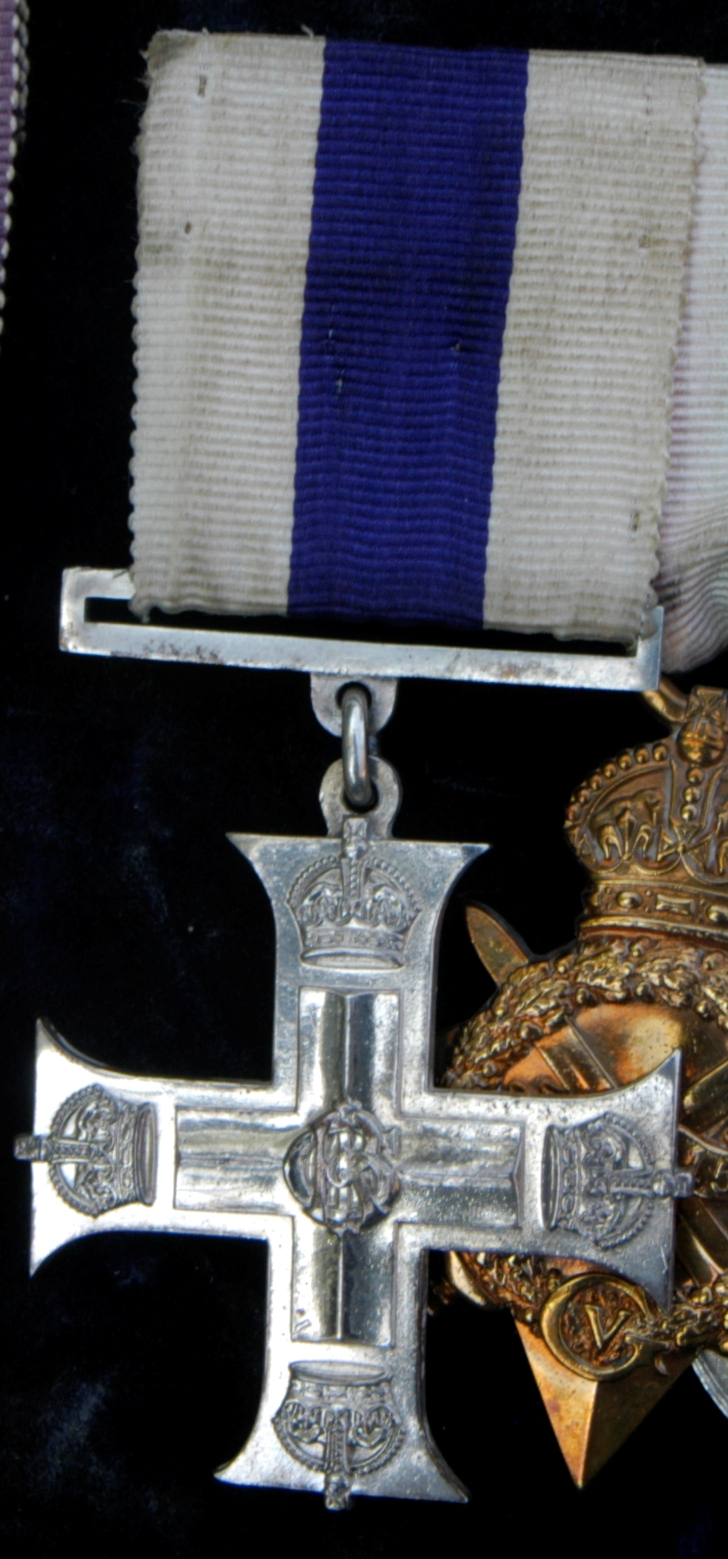
MC awarded to 2nd Lt. E. W. Fane de Salis (1894–1980)

- During World War I, Acting Captain Francis Wallington of the Royal Field Artillery was the first person to be awarded the MC and three bars when he was invested with his third bar on 10 July 1918 (gazetted 13 September 1918: he had obtained the first three awards as a second lieutenant). Three other officers were subsequently awarded a third bar, Percy Bentley, Humphrey Arthur Gilkes and Charles Gordon Timms, all of whose awards appeared in a supplement to the London Gazette on 31 January 1919.
- For their key roles during World War I, the cities of Verdun and Ypres were awarded the Military Cross, in September 1916 and February 1920 respectively. In May 1920, Field Marshal French presented the decoration to Ypres in a special ceremony in the city.
- During World War II Captain Sam Manekshaw, Indian Army (who eventually rose to the rank of Field Marshal), was leading a counter-offensive operation against the invading Japanese Army in Burma. During the course of the offensive, he was hit by a burst of machine-gun fire and severely wounded in the stomach. Major General D.T. Cowan spotted Manekshaw holding on to life and was aware of his valour in face of stiff resistance from the Japanese. Fearing the worst, Cowan quickly pinned his own Military Cross ribbon on to Manekshaw saying, "A dead person cannot be awarded a Military Cross."
- The first posthumous Military Cross was that awarded to Captain Herbert Westmacott, Grenadier Guards for gallantry in Northern Ireland during the period 1 February 1980 to 30 April 1980.
- The first woman to be awarded the Military Cross was Private Michelle Norris of the Royal Army Medical Corps, while attached to The Princess of Wales's Royal Regiment for her actions in Iraq on 11 June 2006. Norris was awarded her medal personally by Queen Elizabeth II on 21 March 2007.
- Able Seaman Kate Nesbitt, second woman, first in the Royal Navy, for acts in Afghanistan in March 2009 as a Medical Assistant attached to 1 RIFLES, 3 Commando Brigade.
- Sergeant Michael Lockett, awarded the MC in 2008, was killed in action in 2009 in Afghanistan. He was the first holder of the MC to be killed in action since World War II.

== See also ==
- Category:Recipients of the Military Cross
- British and Commonwealth orders and decorations
- List of British gallantry awards for the Iraq War

== Bibliography ==
- Abbott, Peter and Tamplin, John. British Gallantry Awards, 2nd ed. (1981). Nimrod Dix and Co., London. ISBN 978-0-902633-74-2.
- Duckers, Peter. British Gallantry Awards 1855–2000 (2011). Shire Publications, Risborough, Buckinghamshire. ISBN 978-0-7478-0516-8.
- Mussell, J. (ed.). Medals Yearbook 2015 (2014). Token Publishing, Honiton, Devon. ISBN 978-1-908828-16-3.
