= List of Old Olavians =

This is a List of notable Old Olavians, these being former pupils of St Olave's and St Saviour's Grammar School and its predecessors, St Olave's and St Saviour's.

== Academic ==
- Prof H. B. Acton (1908–1974), Professor of Philosophy from 1945–64 at Bedford College (London), Director from 1962–4 of the Royal Institute of Philosophy, and President from 1952–3 of the Aristotelian Society
- Prof Sir William Ashley (1860–1927), economic historian, Professor of Economic History from 1892–1901 at Harvard University, and Professor of Commerce from 1901–25 at the University of Birmingham
- Prof Richard Bird, Professor of Computation from 1996–2008 at the University of Oxford and Director from 1998–2003 of the Oxford University Computing Laboratory
- Prof David Conway, philosopher
- Prof Harold Ellis CBE, Emeritus Professor of Surgery, King's College London School of Medicine and Dentistry
- William Heberden FRS, (1710–1801) physician, coined the term 'Angina pectoris'
- Prof Peter Littlewood FRS, Professor of Physics since 1997 at the University of Cambridge, and Head of the Cavendish Laboratory since 2005
- Charles W Lloyd, The Master of Dulwich College from 1967 to 1975
- Prof Sir Desmond Arthur Pond, Professor of Psychiatry, Chief Scientist at the Department of Health and Social Security.
- Arnold Powell (1889–1963), headmaster and clergyman
- Alfred Barton Rendle FRS, Botanist
- Sir Michael Scholar, (born 1942) President, St John's College, Oxford since 2001, and Chairman since 2008 of the UK Statistics Authority
- Prof Thomas Frederick Tout, (1855–1929) historian, Professor of History from 1890–1925 at the University of Manchester, President from 1910–2 of the Historical Association

== Business ==
- Sir Leon Bagrit, pioneer of automation; Chairman and Managing Director of Elliot Automation Ltd. Since 1963, and Deputy Chairman of English Electric Company since 1967; a director of the Royal Opera House; Reith Lecturer 1964.
- Craig Boundy, Chief Operating Officer of Experian

== Clergy ==
- Most Rev. Leonard James Beecher CMG, Bishop of Mombasa 1953–1964; Archbishop of East Africa 1960
- Rt Rev John Boys, Bishop of Lebombo from 1948–51, and of Kimberley and Kuruman from 1951–60
- Rt Rev George Eric Gordon, Bishop of Sodor and Man from 1966–74
- John Harvard, (1607–1638) founder of Harvard University
- Frederick Henry Ambrose Scrivener, theologian
- William Sherlock, (1641–1707) English church leader
- William Van Mildert, (1765–1836) Bishop of Durham; founder of the University of Durham
- Peter Sterry, theologian, Oliver Cromwell’s private chaplain

== Politics and public service ==
- Sir William Artherton (1806-1864), Attorney General from 1861-1863, MP for Durham City from 1852-1864
- Aaron Bell, Conservative MP for Newcastle-under-Lyme
- Godfrey Bloom, UKIP MEP from 2004-2014 for Yorkshire and the Humber
- Frederick Boland (1904-1985), Irish diplomat, president of the General Assembly of the United Nations
- Abba Eban, (1915–2002) Israeli Ambassador to the United Nations; Israeli Minister for Foreign Affairs; Israeli Deputy Prime Minister
- Henry Hartley Fowler, 1st Viscount Wolverhampton, (1830–1911) politician
- Charles Hill, Baron Hill of Luton (1904-1989), National Liberal and Conservative MP for Luton from 1950–63, Postmaster General from 1953–7, and Chairman from 1967–77 of the Board of Governors of the BBC
- Sir Charles Edward Lewis, Bt, MP for Londonderry City 1872-1886 and Antrim North 1887-1892
- Kenneth Lindsay, Labour MP for Kilmarnock Burghs 1933–1945; Civil Lord of the Admiralty 1935–1937; Parliamentary Secretary, Ministry of Education 1937–1940
- Sir Alan Marre, K.C.B., Civil Servant; Deputy Secretary, Ministry of Health 1964–66; Ministry of Labour 1966; Joint Permanent Secretary, Ministry of Health and Social Security 1968; Parliamentary Commissioner for Administration (the Ombudsman) 1971
- Sir William Murison, Chief Justice of Straits Settlements and Singapore
- Chris Philp, Conservative MP for Croydon South
- Alderman Sir William Anderson Rose, MP, Businessman, Lord Mayor of London 1874
- Sir Roger Sims Conservative MP from 1974–97 for Chislehurst, Vice president of the NSPCC, Vice President of the Royal College of Nursing, Member of the Royal Choral Society since 1950
- Alderman David Henry Stone, Lord Mayor of London
- Sir Sydney Waterlow, 1st Baronet (1822–1906), Lord Mayor of London 1872, Member of Parliament

== Military ==
- Maj-Gen Bruce Brealey, General Officer Commanding HQ Theatre Troops since 2008
- Wing Commander Andy Green, (1962– ) RAF fast jet pilot; current holder of the world land speed record
- Air Marshal Sir Brian Reynolds KCB CBE, Commander in Chief from 1956–9 of RAF Coastal Command
- Alfred Oliver Pollard, Victoria Cross recipient, author

== Sport ==
- David Akinluyi, signed professionally with Northampton Saints 2006
- Billy Mehmet, international footballer (Dunfermline Athletic, St Mirren, Gençlerbirliği S.K., Perth Glory, Republic of Ireland U21)
- Nicholas Osipczak, Professional Mixed Martial Artist; cast member of SpikeTV's The Ultimate Fighter: United States vs. United Kingdom
- Aaron Grandidier-Nkanang, part of the French national rugby sevens team that won at the Paris Olympics, plays for Pau at club level.

== The arts ==
- Kevin Armstrong (School years 1970-1974) guitarist (David Bowie and Iggy Pop)
- Samuel Laman Blanchard, (1804–1845) author and journalist
- A. B. Campbell radio broadcaster
- Martin Carthy, folk singer
- William Cole LVO, Master of the Music at the Queen’s Chapel of the Savoy from 1954–94, and Professor of Harmony and Composition from 1948–62 at the Royal Academy of Music
- Matthew Crosby, comedian and actor
- Johnny Douglas (conductor), film score composer
- Lawrence Durrell, novelist, poet, dramatist, and travel writer
- Mark Ellis, School years 1971–1978, record producer better known as Flood
- Andrew Ford, composer
- Kelvin Gosnell, writer & editor (co-founder of 2000 AD)
- Edmund Gwenn, Academy award winning actor
- Nish Kumar, (School years 1996-2003) comedian
- Rob Laidlow, composer
- Dr Noël Harwood Tredinnick BEM FRSCM British composer, organist, orchestrator and conductor.
- Jonathan Vaughn, organist and choir director

== Notable staff ==
- Giovanni Baldelli, anarchist theorist
- Bryan West, rugby player
