= Mary Margaret Heaton =

English art historian (1836–1883)

- Born: Mary Margaret Keymer; 15 May 1836
- Died: 1 June 1883 (aged 47)
- Known for: Art history
- Spouse: Charles William Heaton (m. 1863)
- Relatives: Samuel Laman Blanchard (uncle); Frances Blogg (niece)

Mary Margaret Heaton (born Mary Margaret Keymer; 15 May 1836 – 1 June 1883) was an English art historian.

== Life ==
She was the eldest daughter of James Keymer, a silk-printer, and his wife Margaret, a sister of Samuel Laman Blanchard. Her father was a close friend of Douglas Jerrold, and knew other literary men. In 1863 she married Charles William Heaton, a professor of chemistry. She died on 1 June 1883.

== Works ==
Heaton's first published work was verse for children, written to the designs of Oscar Fletsch. In 1869 she published Masterpieces of Flemish Art, and in 1870 Life of Albrecht Dürer, the first full biography of the artist published in England. It was a success, and Charles Appleton then had her contribute to The Academy.

Concise History of Painting (1873) had a new edition in 1888, as part of Bohn's "Artists' Library". Heaton also prepared a new edition of Allan Cunningham's Lives of British Painters, and wrote new biographies and some of the major articles in the new edition of Bryan's Dictionary of Painters and Engravers. She co-authored with Charles Christopher Black Leonardo da Vinci and his Works (1874), and translated Julius Meyer's biography of Correggio (1876).
