= St Saviour's Grammar School =

Grammar school in London, England

St Saviour's Grammar School was a free grammar school for boys located in the borough of Southwark, south of the River Thames in London, England. It existed as a separate entity from 1559 until 1896, when it was amalgamated with St Olave's Grammar School, which was renamed St Olave's and St Saviour's Grammar School For Boys.

== History ==
The name is from the parish of St Saviour's, which was formed in 1543 from the amalgamation of St Margaret's and St Mary Magdalen's parishes. The parish adopted the name St Saviour's from the recently dissolved Abbey of St Saviour in nearby Bermondsey. The parish then leased the former Priory of St Mary Overie, a dissolved Augustinian monastery, which then became known as St Saviour's Church and was destined to become Southwark Cathedral in 1905.

In 1559, St Saviour's parish sold a quantity of silver plate to fund a new sixty-year lease on the church from Lady Day, dated 6 June 1559. A condition of the lease was that within two years the parish would establish a building and employ a schoolmaster for a free grammar school. On 31 August 1559, the parishioners decided in the interim to run the school in the church house of the old St Margaret parish. This was funded by renting out the Lady Chapel of the priory to a baker, as well as selling the vestments and brass vessels of the parish.

On 16 May 1562 the parishioners paid £42 for a thousand-year lease from Matthew Smith on a building associated with the Green Dragon Inn, which had previously been owned by Lady Cobham. Under the first schoolmaster, Christopher Ockland, the school moved into this new home, known as Green Dragon Court, lying just south of St Saviour's Church and now part of the site of the Borough Market.

The St Saviour's Grammar School received a Charter from Queen Elizabeth I, sealed on 4 June 1562. The event was commemorated on a foundation stone still existing today, although later moved from site to site and now situated at St Olave's Grammar School in Orpington, Greater London.

The chief figure of the Board of Governors was Thomas Cure, the senior Warden of St Saviour's, a special corporation chartered by King Henry VIII to look after both the great priory church and various local charitable bequests. Cure was the Royal Saddler, effectively a haulage contractor, for Edward VI, Mary I and Elizabeth I and lived near the north-west corner of St Saviour's Church. He was a major local benefactor and his endowments are still administered by the corporation; he is commemorated in the Cathedral. The High Master (headmaster) was paid £20 per year and initially only boys from St Saviour's parish could be admitted for a fee of half a crown (2s. 6d), while those from St Olave's and other parishes could pay a fee to the High Master to arrange a schoolmaster for their instruction. St Olave's parish established its own Grammar School in 1571, which meant there were two such foundations within 200 yards of each other.

Probably the most famous pupil of the school during its first hundred years was John Harvard, after whom Harvard University in Cambridge, Massachusetts, was named. His father Robert and his brother Thomas were Governors of the school. However, it had an even more illustrious set of Governors and supporters: a page of the Governors Minutes of 1609 includes the signatures of John Treyhearn, Philip Henslowe and Edward Alleyn. The last-named was to become a major local benefactor, and his principal endowment for Dulwich College was to ensure the continuance of St Saviour's when it was likely to be dissolved almost three hundred years later.

The great fire of Southwark destroyed the school building in 1676 and damaged part of St Saviour's church, although the church tower was unscathed. The school's foundation stone was saved, and a new building was built on the same site. There the school remained until 1839, when the Governors sold the building for £2,250 and relocated (along with the foundation stone) to a third building on Sumner Street to the west. This was actually smaller than the previous building. Canon Edmund Boger was the last headmaster there, from 1859 to 1895.

Canon Boger attempted to halt a serious decline in the school's fortunes, which was due partly to the success of St Olave's and partly to the problem of the 1839 Sumner Street building's size and location. The school roll fell to only 27 pupils in 1892. However, in 1882 the Charity Commissioners in re-organising Dulwich College's endowment had identified the intention of Edward Alleyn towards other institutions he had supported in his life and by his Will; these were to be provided for by the Dulwich Foundation. One of these was St Saviour's and it was this continuing financial contribution that was to make St Saviour's merger with St Olave's more than a merely nominal one.

In 1896, St Saviour's Grammar School and St Olave's Grammar School were amalgamated at St Olave's site on Tooley Street, and the combined school was named St Olave's and St Saviour's Grammar School for Boys. During the Second World War the old Sumner Street building of the former St Saviour's was damaged by bombing. The historic foundation stone was subsequently moved to St Olave's and St Saviour's Grammar School in 1952. When the school relocated to Orpington, Greater London, in 1968, the stone was taken to the new site.

The school in Orpington is often referred to simply as St Olave's Grammar School, but its full name remains St Olave's and St Saviour's Grammar School.

Near the turn of the 20th century, the Charity Commissioners required that girls in the Southwark area should also be given the chance of education, and the Governors of the joint foundation agreed to use their endowment to provide a new school now known as St Saviour's and St Olave's Church of England School.

== Notable former pupils ==
(cf. see List of Old Olavians for a list of post-amalgamation pupils of St Saviour's and St Olave's)

- John Harvard (1607-1638) – clergyman and scholar who bequeathed half his estate and his library for the endowment of the educational institution which became Harvard University in Massachusetts.
- William Sherlock (c. 1641–1707), church of England divine
- William Heberden (1710-1801) – one of the most eminent English physicians of the eighteenth century, studied in Cambridge, personal physician to the Queen in the court of George III, attended to Samuel Johnson when Johnson suffered a stroke, author of Commentaries on the History and Cure of Diseases. In 1777 he donated £500 to St Saviour's Grammar School to augment the salary of the headmaster.
- William Van Mildert (1765-1836) – Bishop of Llandaff, founder of the University of Durham, last 'Prince Bishop' of Durham.
- George Tomlinson (1794–1853) – Bishop of Gibraltar from 1842 to 1863
- Andrew Pritchard (1804-1882) - naturalist, entrepreneur, microscopist
- George Bullen (1816/8-1894), Keeper of Printed Books at the British Museum
- John Hannah (1818–1888), Church of England clergyman and schoolmaster
- Sir Sidney Hedley Waterlow (1822-1906) – Lord Mayor of London, Member of Parliament
- Sir William Atherton – Attorney General of England and Wales in 1861-1863
- Henry Hartley Fowler (1830-1911) – Member of Parliament, Under-Secretary of State for the Home Department, Secretary to the Treasury, Secretary of State for India, first Viscount Wolverhampton
- Louis Lawrence Smith (1830–1910), Australian politician
- John Melhuish Strudwick (1849-1937) – Pre-Raphaelite painter
- Frederick William Walker (1830-1910) - High Master of St Pauls
