= George Bullen =

George Bullen may refer to:

- George Boleyn, Viscount Rochford, English courtier and nobleman
- George Bullen (librarian)
