= Arthur Henry Bullen =

British publisher and Elizabethian literature scholar

Arthur Henry Bullen, often known as A. H. Bullen (9 February 1857, London – 29 February 1920, Stratford-on-Avon), was an English editor and publisher, a specialist in 16th- and 17th-century literature, founder of the Shakespeare Head Press, which for its first decades was a publisher of fine editions in the tradition of the Kelmscott Press, and poet.

== Early life ==
Photograph of A. H. Bullen by Emery Walker

Bullen was a son of George Bullen (d. 1894), a librarian at the British Museum. His interest in Elizabethan dramatists and poets started at the City of London School, before he went on to Worcester College, Oxford, to study classics.

== Career ==
His publishing career began with a scholarly edition of the Works of John Day in 1881 and continued with series of The English Dramatists (London: John C. Nimmo, 1885–88) and a four-volume set of A Collection of Old English Plays (London: Privately printed by Wyman & Sons, 1882–89), some of which he had discovered in manuscript and published for the first time. He was also the first person to publish some early lyric poems. Bullen wrote more than 150 articles for the Dictionary of National Biography, lectured on Elizabethan dramatists at Oxford University and taught at Toynbee Hall.

In 1891, he and H. W. Lawrence went into partnership as the publishers Lawrence & Bullen. This lasted until 1900, when Bullen moved on to publish as A. H. Bullen. With Frank Sidgwick as partner, he then formed the Shakespeare Head Press and published a collected Shakespeare and collected Yeats from their base in Stratford-on-Avon.

Bullen was admired by literary figures like Swinburne and was well known in his time for his enthusiastic scholarship and for rediscovering forgotten works of literature, most notably those of Thomas Campion. Because he modernised as he published, his texts are not used as standard editions by scholars today.

After Bullen's death the press was continued by a partnership including Basil Blackwell, the Oxford bookseller. It continues today as an imprint of Wiley-Blackwell, now printing on normal commercial presses.

== Selected publications ==
- A. H. Bullen, ed. Lyrics from Elizabethan Dramatists (London, 1889)
- A. H. Bullen, ed. Lyrics from the Dramatists of the Elizabethan Age (London: Lawrence and Bullen, 1891)
- A. H. Bullen, Musa Proterva: Love-Poems of the Restoration (privately printed, 1902)
- A. H. Bullen, Weeping-cross, and other rimes (verse)

== Sources ==
- Richard Storer's article on Bullen in the Oxford Dictionary of National Biography (2004)
- H. F. B. Brett-Smith's article on Bullen in the Dictionary of National Biography (1927)
