= Language Change: Progress or Decay? =

1981 linguistics book

- Author: Jean Aitchison
- Language: English
- Subject: language change
- Publisher: Fontana Press (1st ed), Cambridge University Press (from 2nd ed onward)
- Publication date: 1981 (1st ed), 4th ed (2012)
- Media type: Print (hardcover)
- Pages: 308
- ISBN: 9781107023628

Language Change: Progress or Decay? is a book on the topic of language change by Jean Aitchison in which the author concludes that language change is neither a process of decay nor progress.

== Reception ==
The book was reviewed by Philip Baldi, Edwin L. Battistella and John Mullen.
