= Dulwich Estate =

Charity in England

The Dulwich Estate

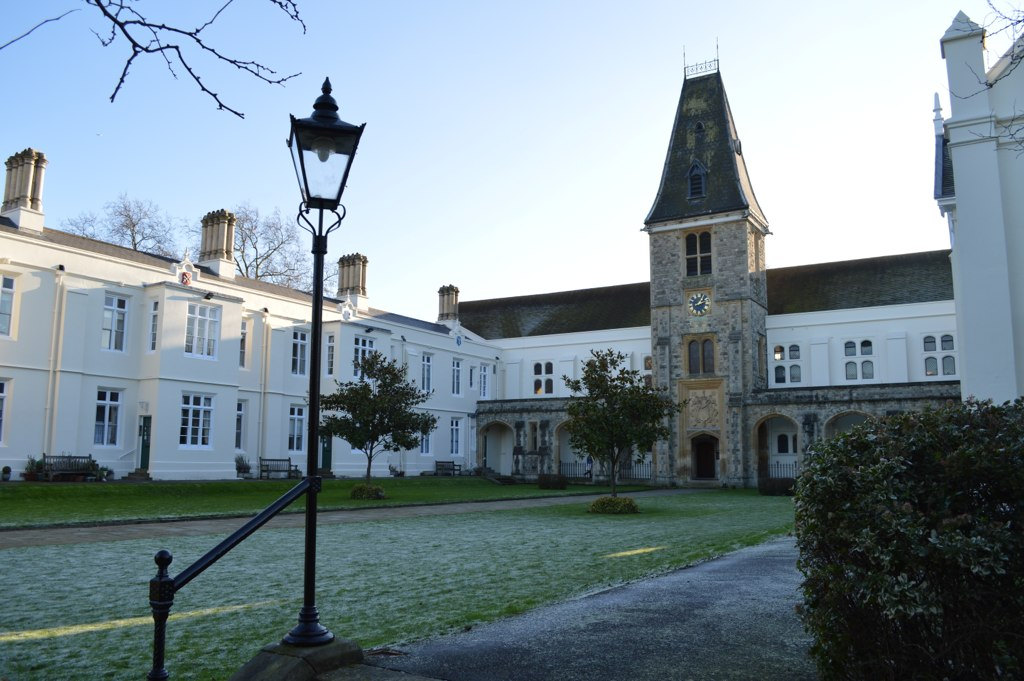
- Head Office, Dulwich Old College
- Predecessor: College of God's Gift
- Formation: July 31, 1995; 30 years ago
- Founder: Edward Alleyn
- Type: Registered charity
- Registration no.: "The Dulwich Estate, registered charity no. 312751". Charity Commission for England and Wales.
- Location: Dulwich, London, United Kingdom
- Chair: Dr Irene Bishop CBE
- Revenue: ▲£14,106,000 (2024)
- Expenses: ▲£14,713,000 (2024)
- Endowment: ▲£375,764,000 (2024)
- Employees: 34 (2024)
- Website: www.thedulwichestate.org.uk
- Formerly called: The Estates Governors of Alleyn's College of God's Gift at Dulwich

1932 map of the Dulwich Estate

The Dulwich Estate, previously the Estates Governors of Alleyn's College of God's Gift at Dulwich, is a registered charity in England, one of the successors to the historic charity Edward Alleyn's College of God's Gift that was founded in 1619. It owns the freehold of around 1,500 acres (6.1 km^{2}) in Dulwich, South London, including a number of private roads and a tollgate. The estate properties range from Regency and 19th century buildings to distinguished modernist 1960s buildings.

A "Scheme of Management" was created in January 1974 under Section 19 ("Retention of management powers for general benefit of neighbourhood") of the Leasehold Reform Act 1967.

A major reorganisation of the College of God's Gift took place on 31 July 1995; the charity, then known as The Estates Governors of Alleyn's College of God's Gift at Dulwich was renamed The Dulwich Estate, and its governing body retitled Trustees. The individual components of the College of God's Gift (the three schools, the almshouse, the chapel and the Dulwich Estate) were separated into individual registered charities.

The Estate distributes its surplus to a number of beneficiaries defined by its governing document. In 2006–7, the Estate had a gross income of £8million, and net assets valued at £187.9million.

== Beneficiaries ==
The Dulwich Estate is empowered to distribute its surplus for charitable purposes to the following beneficiaries only:

- Dulwich Almshouse Charity
- Christ's Chapel of God's Gift
- Alleyn's School
- Dulwich College
- James Allen's Girls' School
- Central Foundation Schools of London, which benefits Central Foundation Boys' School and Central Foundation Girls' School
- St Olave's & St Saviour's Schools Foundation, which benefits St Olave's Grammar School and St Saviour's and St Olave's Church of England School

Dulwich Picture Gallery ceased to be a beneficiary of the charity in 1995.

== History ==
The foundation known as Alleyn's College of God's Gift was founded in 1619 by Edward Alleyn, a Shakespearian actor, for the purposes of educating poor scholars and providing accommodation for poor persons. These basic principles still exist today but on a much wider scale, embracing among the beneficiaries Dulwich College, James Allen's Girls' School, Alleyn's School, Central Foundation Schools, and St Saviour's & St Olave's Schools.

Until 1882, one Board of Governors was responsible for both Educational and Estate administration. It was then decided to create a separate Board of Governors to administer the Estate and to be known as the Estate Governors.

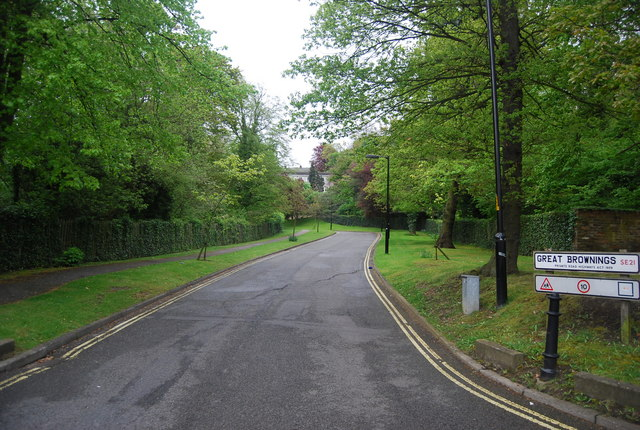
Great Brownings is one of the post-war housing schemes within the Estate.

In the years following the Second World War with significant demand for new housing in London, the Estate commissioned hundreds of new homes within its boundary. Most of these were built by Wates Group and are in the Dulwich Wood conservation area.

In 1995, a major reorganisation of the historic Alleyn's College charity resulted in the reconstitution of The Dulwich Estate as an independent registered charity, and the other former constituents also became independent.

As a registered charity, the Estate is bound to distribute its disposable income to its beneficiaries so that apart from the sums necessarily spent on estate management, it is not in itself wealthy. In the 2022-2023 financial year, the Estate distributed £5m from its income to these beneficiaries.

== Public criticism ==
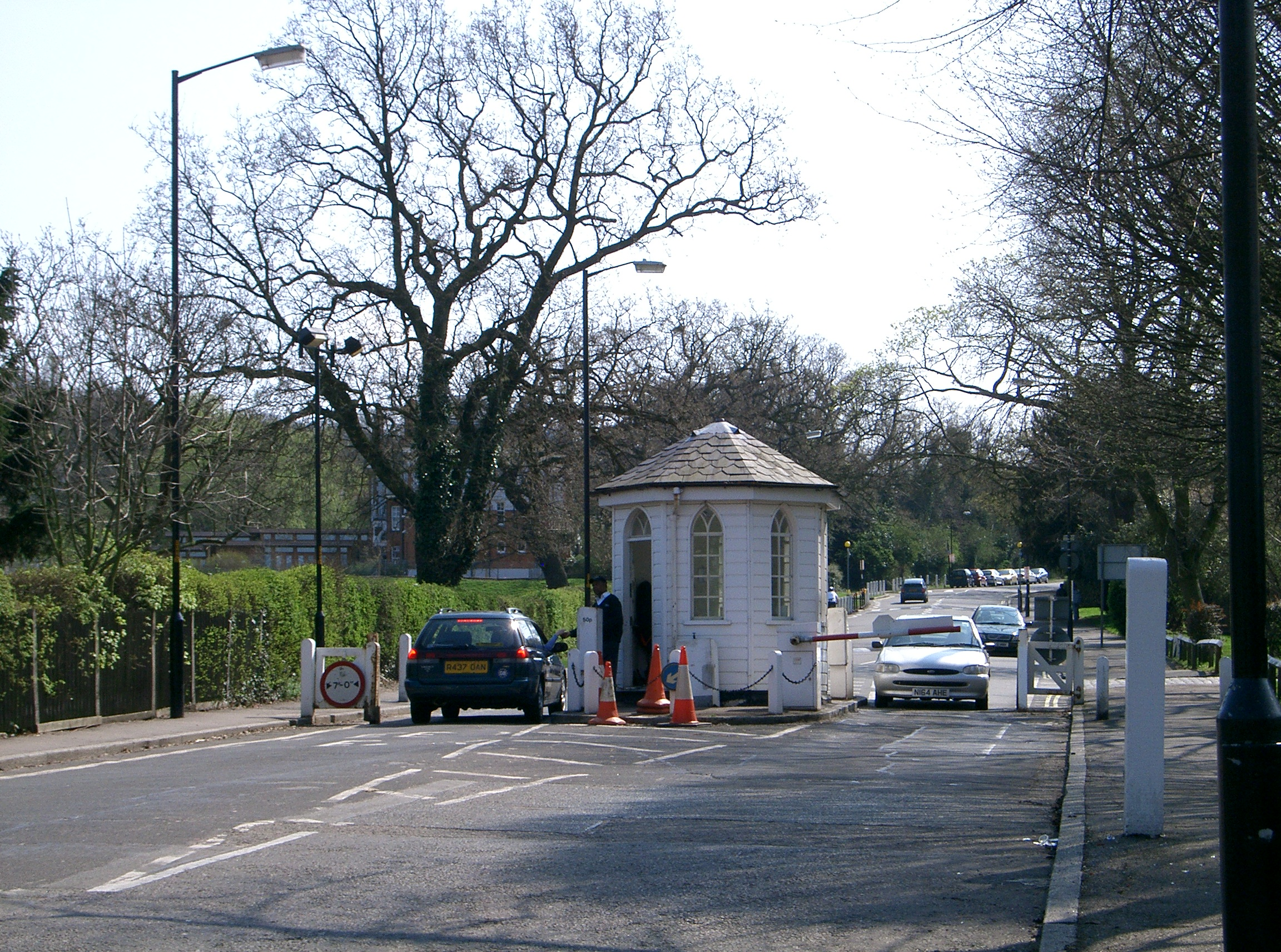
Tollgate on The Dulwich Estate

In 2016, the Estate came under increasing criticism from local businesses and residents over their management of properties in the area. In February 2016, several hundred people, including actor James Nesbitt and journalist Jay Rayner, both local residents, marched through Herne Hill to protest against the Estate's treatment of Just Williams, a local toyshop forced to close after Dulwich Estate increased their rent "by more than 70%".

Similar campaigns have been mounted against the Estate's management of the Half Moon pub, left boarded up for three years following flooding in 2013 and poised to lose its live music space after refurbishment, and the Estate's plans to sell a local primary school's playing field to a property developer.

== The Old College and Almshouses ==
The Old College and Almshouses (Edward Alleyn House) situated at the junction of Gallery Road and College Road, Dulwich Village SE21, were completed by 1618. The central section houses Christ's Chapel which was consecrated in 1616. The west wing originally housed the Almshouses, then became the home of the college. The buildings have been known as the Old College since the New College was opened in 1870. The west wing now houses the offices of the Estate Governors.

The Almshouses (Edward Alleyn House) are situated in the east wing of the Old College. They comprise sixteen recently modernised flats which are let at a modest charge to suitable applicants who have proper qualification, namely a link with any one of the following parishes - St. Botolph's without Bishopsgate, St. Luke's Finsbury, St. Giles Camberwell, and St. Savior's Southwark. These are all parishes with which Edward Alleyn had personal or business connections.

== Management ==
The Board of Trustees consists of 13 persons, namely 9 representative Governors, appointed by the various Parishes and Schools forming part of the Foundation, and 3 co-optive Governors, who must reside in the Hamlet of Dulwich, appointed by resolution of the Estate Governors.

The Estate Governors administer the Estate in accordance with a scheme made by the Board of Education on 4 June 1913, under the Charitable Trusts Acts, 1855 to 1894, as amended by various altering schemes made between 1920 and 1978.

The Estate, comprising some 1,500 acres (6.1 km^{2}), is bounded by Crystal Palace to the South, Denmark Hill to the North, part of Lordship Lane to the East, and Tulse Hill to the West. It is primarily situated in the inner London borough of Southwark, with small parts in the Lambeth and Lewisham, but has large areas of open space. The Estate has been managed by the Estate Governors and their predecessors since 1619 to obtain the maximum benefit for the beneficiaries.

Since the advent of the Leasehold Reform Act 1967, many leaseholders have acquired their freeholds.

== See also ==
- Dulwich Wood
