= St Olave's Grammar School =

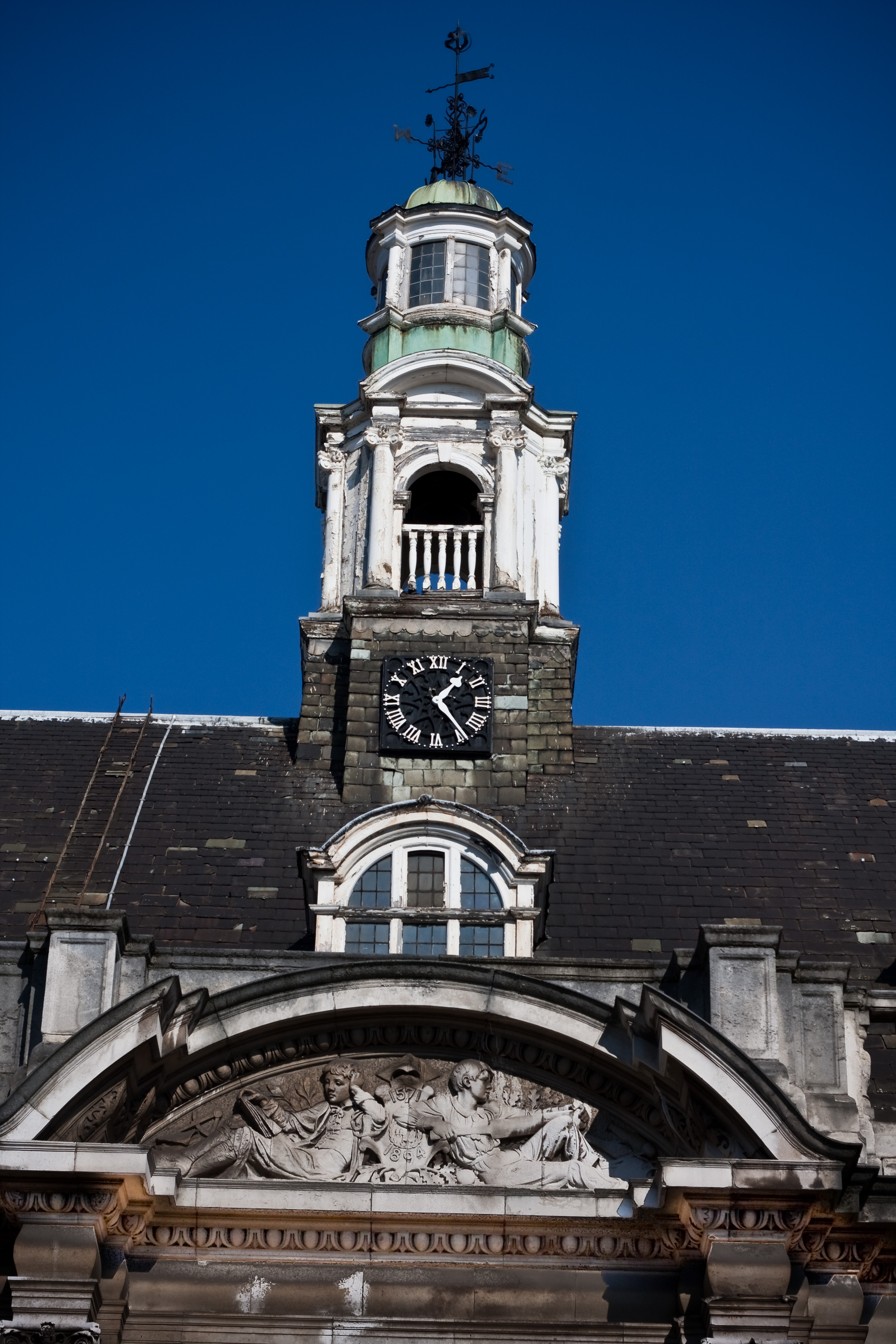
- Clock tower of the former school building on Queen Elizabeth Street

Location
- Goddington Lane; Orpington, Greater London, BR6 9SH; England; 51.3675°N 0.104°E

Information
- Other names: St Olave's Grammar School; St Olave's
- Type: Voluntary aided grammar school
- Motto: Olaf to Right the Wrong
- Religious affiliation: Church of England
- Established: 1571; 455 years ago
- Local authority: Bromley
- Department for Education URN: 101676 Tables
- Ofsted: Reports
- Chair of governors: Adrian Boyd
- Headmaster: Andrew Rees
- Chaplain: Julie Bowen
- Gender: Male (co-educational sixth form)
- Age: 11 to 18
- Enrolment: 1081 (2020)
- Capacity: 838
- Houses: Bingham; Cure; Harvard; Leeke
- Colours: Purple, black and white
- Song: Jerusalem
- Publication: The Olavian Magazine
- Affiliation: Woodard Foundation
- Alumni: Old Olavians
- Beneficiary of: St Olave's and St Saviour's Schools Foundation and Dulwich Estate
- Website: www.saintolaves.net

St. Olave's Grammar School (formally St. Olave's and St. Saviour's Church of England Grammar School) (/ˈoʊlævz/ or /ˈɒlɪvz/) is a selective secondary school for boys in Orpington, Greater London, England. Founded by royal charter in 1571, the school occupied several sites in Southwark, before establishing a location on Tooley Street in 1893. It moved to the suburb of Orpington in 1968, and has admitted girls to its sixth form since 1998.

A former Sunday Times State School of the Year (2008), the school is selective at both initial entry and for entry to the sixth form, but it has been criticised for policies that led to students being excluded from the sixth form for not achieving high grades. In 2017, parents threatened legal action against the policies applied by headteacher Aydin Önaç (who subsequently resigned), and the London Borough of Bromley instituted an inquiry whose critical report was published in July 2018. He was succeeded by Andrew Rees.

== History ==
=== St Saviour's Grammar School ===
A new lease for the parish church of St Saviour's dated 16 June 1559 included a pledge to start a school within two years. Within a few weeks a school for boys was functioning in temporary accommodation. On 24 November 1560 the four first wardens of the school were elected, and on 4 March 1561 a lease was handed over to the wardens for a new schoolhouse: a building in the Green Dragon, formerly Cobham's Inn. A licence/charter for St Saviour's Grammar School was obtained in 1562.

In 1676 the building in the Green Dragon was destroyed in the Great Fire of Southwark—the City of London fire was in 1666—and a new building was built on the same site.

In 1839 the school site was required for the enlargement of the Borough Market and a third building was built in Sumner Street in 1839. It was smaller than the previous one due to a decline in numbers.

St Saviour's Grammar School agreed to amalgamation with St Olave's in 1896. At the same time the creation of a new school for girls was envisaged, and this came into being in 1903 and was named St Saviour's and St Olave's Grammar School for Girls.

=== St Olave's Grammar School ===
Henry Leeke, a Southwark brewer, left a will (13 April 1560) which gave £8 a year towards the founding and maintenance of a new free school. If the parish of St Olave's failed to create such a school within two years, St Saviour's parish was to have the money.

In November 1560, notice to quit was given to tenants of the rooms which were to be used for the school, and in July 1561 the church wardens of St Olave's were ordered to receive Leeke's legacy, and "prepare" a schoolmaster by Michaelmas Day. Assuming that everything went to schedule, the school began teaching on Michaelmas Day 1561.

On 25 July 1571 letters patent were obtained which established the school as a grammar school. The charter stipulated that the school be called: The Free Grammar School of Queen Elizabeth of the Parishioners of the Parish of Saint Olave in the County of Surrey.

Initially the school was housed in the old Vestry Hall of the church and its adjoining premises (on the west side of Churchyard Alley, a narrow lane off the south side of Tooley Street, running parallel with Borough High Street).

In the seventeenth century St Olave's Headmaster Robert Browne was imprisoned for non-conformism.

Although the school was untouched by the Great Fire of Southwark, major renovation and extension was undertaken in 1676 after the fire.

In 1829 the school had to move because its site was needed for the approach to the new London Bridge, which was built about 60 yd (55 m) west of the old bridge. A new building was built in Bermondsey Street, with the first stone being laid on 17 November 1834. However this building did not last long due to the rapid expansion of the railways, which wanted the land, and another building at Green Bank, in Back Street (later renamed Queen Elizabeth Street) was built in 1855.

This new building was soon deemed to be unsuitable due to the fact that it was designed for a system of teaching which fell out of favour, and had almost no provision for classrooms.

Another building was put up in stages on the same site, while the old building was dismantled. Work was begun in 1892 and completed in 1894. The new building was designed by Edward William Mountford, the architect of the Old Bailey, and it is this building which still stands in Queen Elizabeth Street near the approach to Tower Bridge (also completed in 1894).

=== Second World War ===
The school was evacuated to Torquay Boys' Grammar School, and to South Devon Technical College from September 1939, with headteacher R C Carrington. The prize day was held at Torquay Pavilion. The school returned to London in April 1945.

=== Orpington ===
The Queen Elizabeth Street building was abandoned by the school in 1968, when it moved to Orpington.

During World War II the former St Saviour's building in Sumner Street was damaged by bombing. Consequently, in 1952 the historic foundation stone was moved from Sumner Street to the Queen Elizabeth Street site. When the school was relocated to Orpington in 1968, the stone was taken to the new site.

The school was at the centre of controversy in 1996 when Labour Party Shadow Cabinet minister Harriet Harman sent her son to the school, despite her party's opposition to grammar schools and the fact that the school was located at some considerable distance from where she lived.

=== Admission procedure inquiry ===
On 11 May 2016 a petition was set up by students objecting to new, harder sixth form entry requirements; it gained over 1,000 signatures in two days. Then in August 2017, parents were informed that sixteen children were no longer welcome to continue into year 13, as their year 12 results were too poor. This caused a group of parents to take the school to court for excluding the pupils unlawfully. On 1 September, the school made a statement that the excluded pupils would be allowed to return to school for Year 13. The chair of the governors resigned due to lack of time to carry out his role.

It emerged that headteacher Aydin Önaç and bursar Alan Wooley had set up a business earlier in 2016, with the knowledge of the governors, where they were registered as the sole shareholders. The company filed three applications to hold trademarks related to St Olave's school. The governors decided the format of the business did not follow good practice.

On 19 October 2017 the new chair of governors, Paul Wright, announced that the headteacher had been suspended "without prejudice" while an inquiry ("in respect of concerns that have been raised over recent weeks") by the Bromley London Borough Council took place. Some parents used the annual general meeting of the school's parents' association in early November to campaign for Önaç's reinstatement, but the following week, on 17 November, the school announced Önaç would be leaving the school in December 2017, "for personal reasons". Freedom of Information requests revealed that 72 students had been forced out of the school during their A-level studies since Önaç became head in the 2010-2011 academic year.

The report of Bromley council's independent inquiry, led by educationalist Christine Whatford, was published in July 2018, and accused St Olave's of illegally treating its students as "collateral damage" in the pursuit of its own interests. It called for a root and branch makeover at the school after exposing multiple cases of maladministration, said Bromley council and the Diocese of Rochester should apologise to affected parents, and urged the school to scrap its policy of restricting access to the upper sixth form, it questioned Önaç's claims that he did not know the exclusions were potentially illegal.

The report criticised the school's financial management and the way in which five governors who disagreed with the head were removed, and found the head unconstitutionally interfered with the management of the PA (Parents Association). It criticised the head and bursar's establishment of the companies to manage school trademarks.

== General information ==
The school is a beneficiary of the St Olave's and St Saviour's Schools Foundation. Its historic sister school is St Saviour's and St Olave's Church of England School in New Kent Road. Established in 1903, as a girls grammar school, this is now a non-selective girls' school.

Until the scheme was discontinued in 2010, St Olave's was designated as a science, mathematics and computing specialist school. The school later applied for academy status; in 2015 this was reported to be 'on hold' pending resolution of governance issues between the Diocese of Rochester, the school and the Department for Education.

Members of the school are known as Olavians, and alumni as Old Olavians. There are four houses: Bingham, Cure, Harvard and Leeke. These exist for the purposes of the classes and house competitions in the Lower School (Years 7 to 9) and for games competition in Year 10.

It was the Sunday Times State School of the Year in 2008 and in 2011 was ranked as the fourth best performing state school in the country at A-level by the Financial Times.

=== Admissions ===
==== Year 7 entry ====
The school has been heavily oversubscribed in the past (more than 10 applicants per place in 2008). Entry had for some years solely been determined by a pair of competitive papers in English and Mathematics; however, due to the demand for entry to the school, a two-stage entrance process existed. Verbal and Non-Verbal Reasoning (which had formed the 3rd entrance paper until the Autumn 2007 exams, for entry September 2008) formed part of Stage 1, a single multiple-choice paper which also included English and Maths. Those who passed this first paper then took Stage 2, the traditional pair of English and Maths papers. Marks for the two stages were then standardised and aggregated; the candidates with the top 124 aggregate marks were offered places in Year 7.

==== Sixth form ====
Competition for sixth form places is also high. Pupils are selected for the sixth form on the basis of their GCSE results, and pupils have been subsequently expelled for under-achieving. In 2017 parents claimed this practice was illegal, and petitioned for judicial review.

=== Choristers ===
St Olave's exclusively provides Choristers for the Choir of the King's Chapel of the Savoy, London, which is a Chapel Royal, the Chapel of the Royal Victorian Order and of the Duchy of Lancaster. Until the school relocated to Orpington, it used to provide the choir for Southwark Cathedral through its connection to the St Saviour's foundation. However, the Charity Commissioners required that activities and intended beneficiaries related to Southwark had to continue to be provided for by the Foundation, which supports the Cathedral choir today.

== Old Olavians ==
This is a list of old students of St Olave's and St Saviour's, and the two schools prior to their merger.

This is a partial list. For a more comprehensive one see: List of Old Olavians

- H. B. Acton, philosopher
- David Akinluyi, rugby player for Nigeria and Northampton Saints
- Kevin Armstrong, guitarist.
- Sir William Ashley, economic historian
- Samuel Laman Blanchard, author and journalist
- Godfrey Bloom, UKIP MEP
- William Cole, composer, organist and conductor, and Master of the Music at the Queen's Chapel of the Savoy
- Matthew Crosby, comedian
- Lawrence Durrell, novelist, poet, dramatist, and travel writer
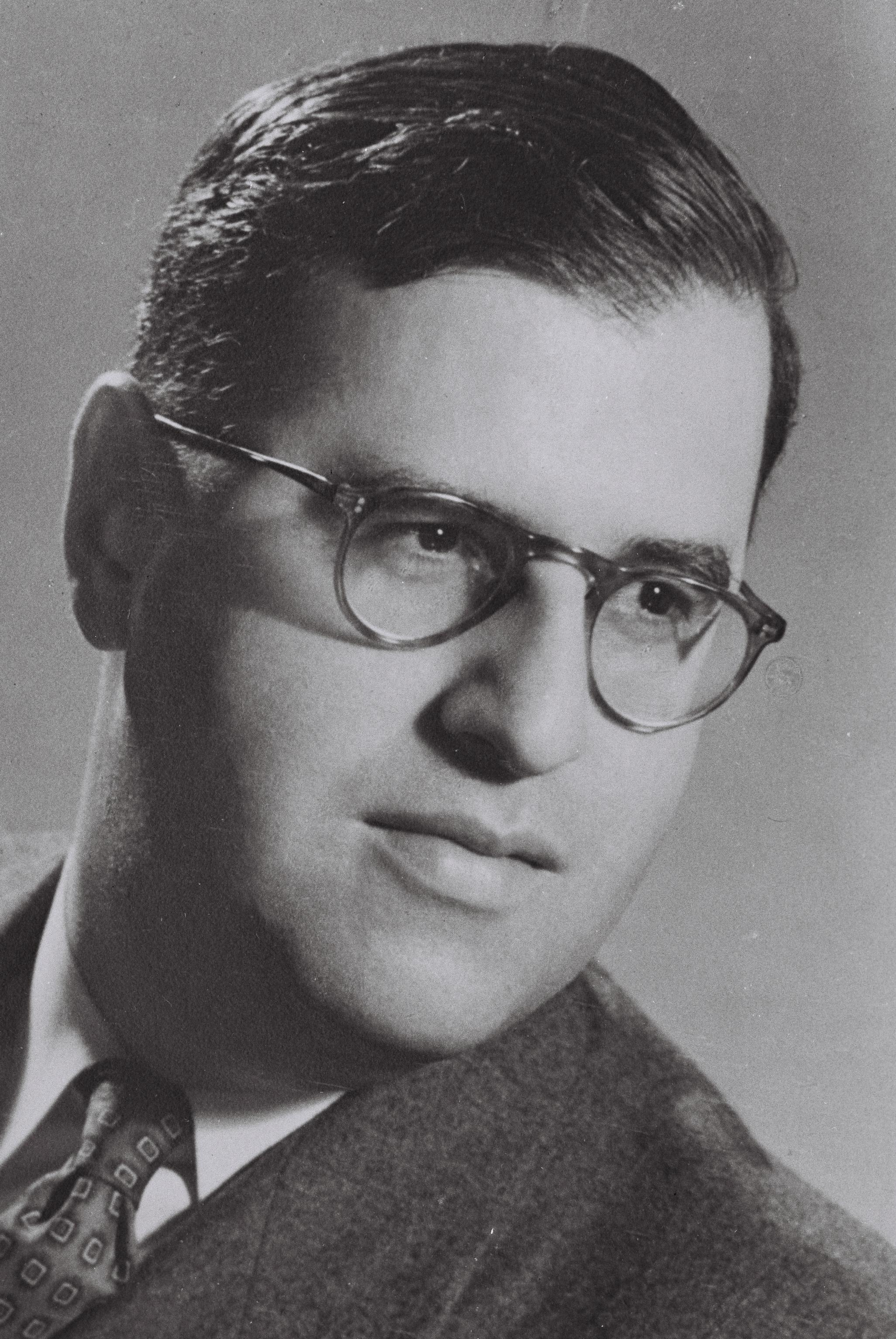
  Abba Eban
- Abba Eban, Israeli Ambassador to the United Nations; Israeli Minister for Foreign Affairs; Israeli Deputy Prime Minister; President of the Weizmann Institute of Science
- Mark Ellis, known as "Flood", record producer (U2, Depeche Mode, The Killers)
- Henry Fowler, 1st Viscount Wolverhampton, (1830–1911), politician ‡
- Andy Green, RAF fast jet pilot; current holder of the world land speed record
- Edmund Gwenn, actor
- John Harvard, benefactor of Harvard University
- William Heberden, physician, coined the term "Angina pectoris" ‡
- Charles Hill, Baron Hill of Luton, Chairman of the BBC and ITA
- Nish Kumar, comedian and television presenter
- Billy Mehmet, footballer
- Nick Osipczak, UFC fighter
- Sir Desmond Arthur Pond, professor; civil servant with the Department of Health and Social Security
- Chris Philp, Member of Parliament for Croydon South
- Aaron Grandidier-Nkanang, part of the France national rugby sevens team at the 2024 Paris Olympics and Section Paloise
- William Sherlock, English church leader ‡
- George Tomlinson, Bishop of Gibraltar, founder of the Cambridge Apostles ‡
- Thomas Frederick Tout, historian
- William Van Mildert, Bishop of Durham; founder of the University of Durham ‡
- Sir Sydney Waterlow, 1st Baronet, Lord Mayor of London, MP ‡

‡ Alumni of St Saviour's Grammar School prior to the merger

=== Masonic lodge ===
There is an Old Olavians masonic lodge, "The Old Olavians' Lodge", which welcomes former students and others associated with the school.
