= Jean Aitchison =

British linguist and writer, born 1938

- Born: 3 July 1938 (age 88)
- Died: 2026
- Education: University of Cambridge; Radcliffe College
- Occupations: Linguist; professor

Jean Margaret Aitchison (born 3 July 1938 - 2026) was Professor Emerita of Language and Communication in the Faculty of English Language and Literature at the University of Oxford and a Fellow of Worcester College, Oxford. Her main areas of interest included socio-historical linguistics; language and the mind; and language and the media.

== Biography ==
Aitchison earned her MA from Cambridge, and an AM from Radcliffe College at Harvard. She was an assistant lecturer in Greek at Bedford College London from 1961 to 1965, lecturer and senior lecturer, and reader in linguistics at the London School of Economics from 1965 to 1992. She was the Rupert Murdoch Professor of language and communication at Oxford from 1993 to 2003, Professorial Fellow at Worcester College, Oxford from 1993 to 2003 (emeritus since 2003).

In 1996 she gave the BBC Reith lectures on The Language Web.

Professor Aitchison was a descendant of Sir Charles Umpherston Aitchison, lieutenant governor of the Punjab from 1882 to 1887 and founder of Aitchison College in Lahore, Pakistan.

== Research ==
In Aitchison (1987), she identified three stages that occur during a child's acquisition of vocabulary: labelling, packaging and network building.

1. Labelling: First stage and involves making the link between the sounds of particular words and the objects to which they refer, e.g., understanding that "mummy" refers to the child's mother.
2. Packaging: Entails understanding a word's range of meaning.
3. Network Building: Involves grasping the connections between words: understanding that some words are opposite in meaning, e.g., understanding the relationship between hypernyms and hyponyms.

These stages are discussed in detail in surveys of theories of vocabulary acquisition such as Milton & Fitzpatrick (2014).

== Key publications ==
- New Media Language (edited with Diana M. Lewis). London and New York: Routledge.
- Words in the Mind: An Introduction to the Mental Lexicon. 3rd edition (1st edition 1987). Oxford and New York: Basil Blackwell, 2003.
- Language Change: Progress or Decay? 4th edition (1st edition 1981). Cambridge, New York, Melbourne: Cambridge University Press, 2012.
- The Articulate Mammal: An Introduction to Psycholinguistics. 4th edition (1st edition 1976). London and New York: Routledge, 1998.
- The Language Web: The Power and Problem of Words. 1996 BBC Reith lectures. Cambridge, New York, Melbourne: Cambridge University Press, 1997.
- The Seeds of Speech: Language Origin and Evolution. Cambridge, New York, Melbourne: Cambridge University Press, 1996. (Also, with new extended introduction, in C.U.P. Canto series, 2000.)
