= The Chaucer Head Bookshop =

Bookshop in Stratford-upon-Avon, England

Coordinates: 52.1909°N 1.7075°W

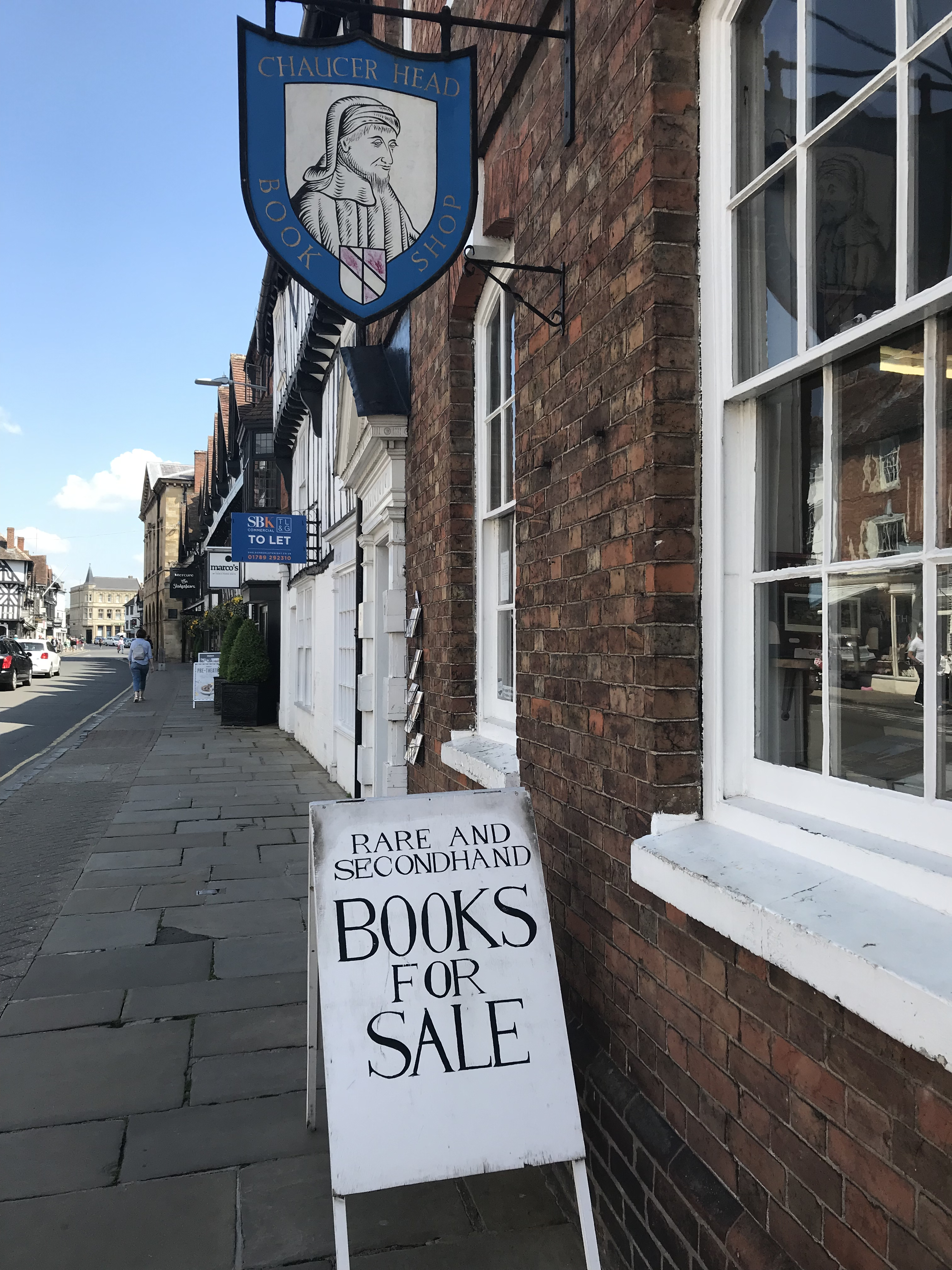
The Chaucer Head Bookshop

The Chaucer Head Bookshop is a general and second hand bookseller in Stratford-upon-Avon, Warwickshire, England. It was founded in 1830 in Birmingham before moving to Stratford-upon-Avon in 1960.

== Building ==
The shop was founded by John Cadby in 1830, and was then succeeded in March 1870 by a William Downing.

The shop is now located in a Grade II listed building at 21, Chapel Street, Stratford-upon-Avon, moving here in 1960. It was home to Julius Shaw, a friend of William Shakespeare best known for being a witness to the poet and dramatist's will. Over the centuries it has also housed the first infirmary in Stratford and at least two banks (visitors can see the extraordinarily thick door which presumably made up the first line of bank security).

In 1905 it became home to The Shakespeare Head Press, founded by Arthur Henry Bullen after he had a dream in which he was presented with a copy of the works of Shakespeare "printed in the poet's home town".

Because of the Shakespeare connection a wealth of documentary evidence survives - for example the names and occupations of each tenant for the last 400 years can be traced.

== See also ==
- Book trade in the United Kingdom
