= Frances Blogg =

English author (1869–1938)

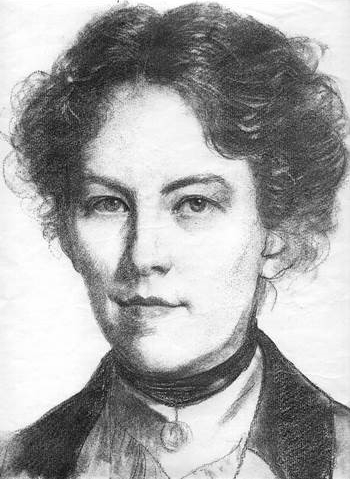
- Portrait by Alfred Priest, c. 1906
- Born: Frances Alice Blogg; 28 June 1869
- Died: 12 December 1938 (aged 69); Beaconsfield, Buckinghamshire, England, United Kingdom
- Education: St Stephen's College, Clewer
- Spouse: G. K. Chesterton (m. 1901; died 1936)
- Relatives: Mary Margaret Heaton (aunt)
- Writing career
- Genres: verse, song

Frances Alice Blogg Chesterton (28 June 1869 – 12 December 1938) was an English author of verse, songs and school drama. The wife of G. K. Chesterton, she had a large role in his career as his amanuensis and personal manager.

== Early life ==
Frances was born on 28 June 1869, the first of seven children of George William Blogg and Blanche (née Keymer). The family was of French Huguenot origin, the last name being anglicised from de Blogue. Frances's mother taught her and her sisters to think independently, having them attend London's first kindergarten. She was educated at a progressive Ladies' School in Fitzroy Square run by Rosalie and Minna Praetorius, followed by Notting Hill High School. Her father died when she was fourteen years old. Later, she attended St Stephen's College for two years as a pupil teacher. She taught Sunday school at an Anglican church in Bedford Park. There, she became very involved in her faith by reading the Bible and devoting herself to the saints. In 1895, Frances began working as a secretary and administrator at the Parents' National Educational Union. She planned and organised conferences, gave speeches, and edited their publications until she married G. K. Chesterton.

== Marriage ==
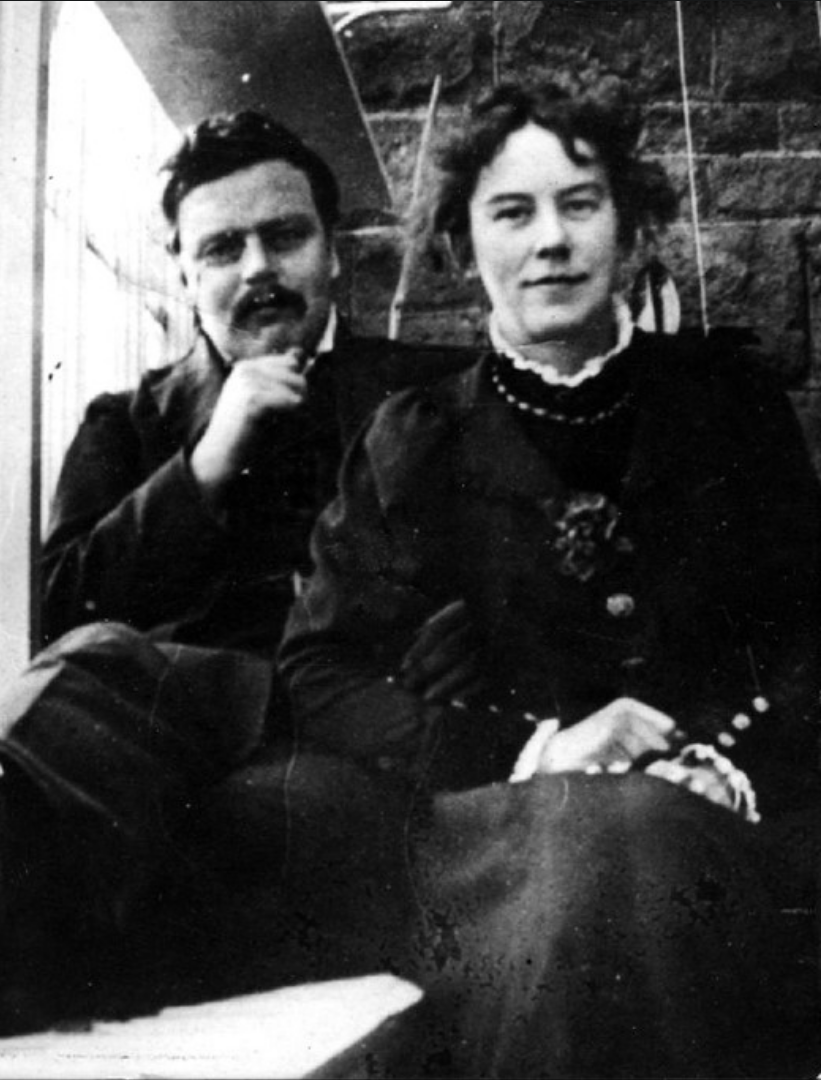
Blogg with her then-fiancé G. K. Chesterton, c. 1895

Blogg first met Chesterton in 1896 and the two married on 28 June 1901 in St Mary Abbots, Kensington. Throughout their marriage, Frances encouraged his writing; she worked as a manager, keeping his appointments, diary, and accounts, hiring his typists, and negotiating on his behalf with publishers.

G. K. admired Frances's faith and how she lived it out by reading the Bible, teaching Sunday school, and taking care of the sick and elderly. Frances introduced him to the Holy Trinity and Jesus. In G. K. Chesterton's poem The Ballad of the White Horse, he gives Frances the recognition of this impact in his life, showing that she was the reason he converted:

Therefore I bring these rhymes to you
Who brought the cross to me.

Frances was received into the Catholic Church on 1 November 1926, four years after her husband. Frances's faith was tested while coping with her brother's suicide, yet the Chestertons helped one another through hard times to maintain their relationship with Jesus.

Each Christmas, she wrote a poem for their Christmas card, one of which, "How far is it to Bethlehem?", was later published as the hymn "Is It Far To Bethlehem?".

== Death and legacy ==
In 1909, the couple moved to Beaconsfield, Buckinghamshire, where they lived until their deaths. She was widowed on 14 June 1936, and died on 12 December 1938.

The Charity of Frances Alice Chesterton was established by her will and was registered as a charity in 1965 (registered charity number 252034). It supports the work of the Catholic Church in the parish of Beaconsfield.

== Works ==
=== Plays ===
- The Children's Crusade
- Sir Cleges
- The Christmas Gift
- Piers Plowman's Pilgrimage
- The Three Kings
- Legends of Gods and Saints

=== Christmas Card Poetry ===
- Christmas 1911 In Her Warm Arms Our Lady
- Christmas 1912 Upon a Little Bank of Grass
- Christmas 1917 How Far Is It To Bethlehem?
- Christmas 1918 Seen and Unseen
- Christmas 1921 The Beast of Burden
- Christmas 1922 A Ballade of Christmas
- Christmas 1923 The Crusaders’ Carol
- Christmas 1925 The Carol of Three Brothers
- Christmas 1926 A Lullaby Carol
- Christmas 1927 Gold, Frankincense, and Myrrh
- Christmas 1928 What Manner of Salutation?
- Christmas 1929 Sed Ex Deo Nati Sunt
- Christmas 1930 The Cradle of the Winds (Notre Dame)
- Christmas 1931 The Lowly Gifts
- Christmas 1932 And It Was Winter
- Christmas 1933 Lux Mundi
- Christmas 1934 In Coelo Et Terra
- Christmas 1937 Now Is Our Salvation

=== Music ===
- Words to Geoffrey Shaw's "A Lullaby Carol"
