= St Saviour's and St Olave's Church of England School =

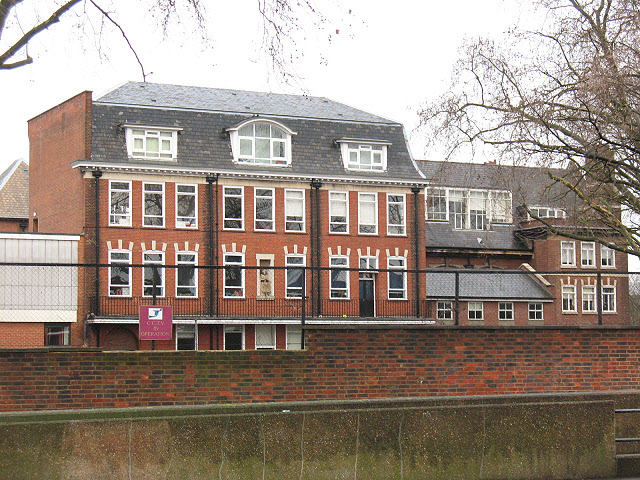
- The school on New Kent Road

Location
- New Kent Road; London, SE1 4AN; England; 51.4947°N 0.0875°W

Information
- Type: Voluntary aided school
- Religious affiliation: Church of England
- Established: 1903
- Local authority: Southwark
- Specialist: Science
- Department for Education URN: 100849 Tables
- Ofsted: Reports
- Headteacher: Catherine May
- Gender: Girls
- Age: 11 to 18
- Enrolment: 786- as of April 2016
- Website: http://www.ssso.southwark.sch.uk/

St Saviour's and St Olave's Church of England School is a comprehensive secondary school and sixth form for girls located on New Kent Road near Elephant and Castle, in the London Borough of Southwark, England. It is a voluntary aided Church of England school in the Anglican Diocese of Southwark and is affiliated to the Woodard Schools group.

== History ==
The school was founded in 1903 as a girls' grammar school to complement St Olave's and St Saviour's Grammar School for boys, after the Charity Commissioners had required that girls in the area should be afforded some equality of education, and the Governors of the joint foundation agreed to use their endowment to provide this. Both schools are beneficiaries of the charitable St Olave's and St Saviour's Schools Foundation, which in turn is a beneficiary of The Dulwich Estate, successor to the historic College of God's Gift charity. (See also St Saviour's Grammar School, and St Olave's Grammar School.)

On examination of the separate governing instruments of the two ancient grammar schools which had merged a few years before, it was clear that St Olave's purpose to educate "boys", while that of St Saviour's was to do so for "younglings". St Olave's governors had already set up a 'Girls School Fund' but the Dulwich and St Saviour's endowment was vital to realise this proposal. It was therefore proposed to set up a new girls' school, to be called 'St Saviour's and St Olave's Grammar School for Girls'. A local landowner, Lord Llangattock, was approached to provide a site, and this new part of the educational foundation was opened in 1903 at the present New Kent Road site. Two small parish schools and old endowment, for St Thomas (the 'May Feast Society') and St John's girls schools, were combined into it.

The school ceased to be a grammar school in 1977, in the Inner London Education Authority reorganisation of the 1960s. A new chapel was consecrated by the Archbishop of Canterbury in 1999. In 2001 Tony Blair, while Prime Minister, announced that year's General Election while on a visit to the New Kent Road site. For the celebration of the centenary of the school in 2003, HM Queen Elizabeth visited it and unveiled a commemorative piece of public art.

== Present day ==
The school remains a semi-independent Church of England voluntary aided school. The similar names for the girls' and boys' schools and the educational foundation sometimes cause confusion, but when a proposal to rename the girls' school simply 'St Saviour's' was made it was unwelcome. Nevertheless, the "old girls'" association call themselves the 'Salvatorians', while the old boys of St Olave's are known as 'Old Olavians'.

The school remains to hold its Christian ethos, holding annual Commemoration Service at the ancient parish church, now known as Southwark Cathedral.

== Notable former pupils ==
- Liz Fraser, actress
- Kathleen Harrison, actress
- Marianne Jean-Baptiste, actress
- Kathleen Nadolski, quizmaster
- Deborah Levy, novelist, playwright and poet
- Susie Wokoma, actress and writer
