= Aydin Önaç =

Headteacher at English schools

Aydin Önaç (born December 1951) is a former teacher, and a former headteacher of English secondary schools. As a headteacher, some of his school policies were the subject of national controversies.

== Early career ==
Önaç was deputy head of The Chase School in Malvern, Worcestershire up to 2002.

== Head teacher career ==
=== Tewkesbury School ===
Önaç was head teacher of Tewkesbury School in Gloucestershire until 2006.

=== Fortismere School ===
He was controversially given a £40,000 'golden hello' upon being appointed head teacher, aged 56, at Fortismere School in Muswell Hill in north London in 2006, but defended the step citing the costs of moving into London from the shires.

Önaç attempted to raise the entry requirement for the school's sixth form from five GCSE A* to C grades to five A* to B grades. As a result, school governors were criticised by the Department for Education and Science.

Önaç also pushed the school towards foundation status in June 2007, making the school financially independent of Haringey Council, allowing governors to change admissions criteria, sell off land and control staff's terms and conditions – despite opposition from 70 per cent of parents. Students at the school had petitioned Önaç to be consulted on any changes relating to foundation status.

In September 2009, Önaç altered the comprehensive school's entry criteria, reserving places for musically gifted children – a policy described as 'elitist', favouring wealthier parents and more academic children.

Önaç was also criticised for changing policy towards children with special needs. Ten children were affected by the changes, which reduced personnel in what had been a well-staffed special needs department, and breached legal requirements concerning the hours of support provided to children. Parents sought a judicial review of Önaç's approach to special needs provision, but in December 2009 he resigned from his post soon after the legal action started. The action was subsequently discontinued and special needs provision improved after Önaç's departure.

His departure drew mixed reactions. Muswell Hill councillor Jonathan Bloch said "Aydin Onac will not be sorely missed by the community. He was the most divisive headmaster that could have been appointed to a comprehensive school in Muswell Hill. The governors should be hanging their heads in shame. Hopefully, the new appointment will mend fences in the community and make Fortismere the inclusive community school it once was." Fortismere governors' chairman Jules Mason said: "We will all be very sorry to lose Aydin. He has led Fortismere through to foundation status and made a tremendous contribution to raising standards and achievement across the whole school. He will leave behind a strong and committed senior management team, well equipped to sustain and build on the improvements he has delivered."

=== St Olave's Grammar School ===
In September 2010, Önaç left Fortismere to take up the post of head teacher at St Olave's Grammar School in Orpington, becoming the sixth headmaster of the school since 1896. One of his first acts as headteacher was to eat a poisonous spider in a fund-raising stunt.

The school had consistently been one of the top achieving state schools in the UK (prior to Önaç's arrival, it was the Sunday Times State School of the Year in 2008). Under Önaç's leadership, the school was steered through its most successful seven years in terms of A-Level and GCSE results. In 2011 it was ranked as the fourth best performing state school in the country at A-level by the Financial Times, adding to competition for places at the school. Önaç became strongly associated with the school's highly selective entry and retention policies.

On 11 May 2016 a petition was set up by students in the school objecting to new, harder sixth form entry requirements; it gained over 1,000 signatures in two days.

In August 2017, parents were informed that 16 children were no longer welcome to continue into year 13, as their year 12 results were too poor. This caused a group of parents to take the school to court for excluding the pupils unlawfully. On 1 September, the school made a statement that the excluded pupils would be allowed to return to school for Year 13. Many believe that the chair of the governors resigned due to lack of time, but his resignation had been planned for some time, resulting in negative press at the time of his resignation.

About the same time it emerged that Önaç and bursar Alan Wooley had set up a business earlier in the year, with the knowledge of the governors, where they were registered as the sole shareholders. The company filed three applications to hold trademarks related to St Olave's school. The governors decided the format of the business did not follow good practice.

On 19 October 2017 the new chair of governors, Paul Wright, announced that the head teacher had been suspended "without prejudice" while an inquiry ("in respect of concerns that have been raised over recent weeks") by the London Borough of Bromley took place. Parents who supported the head and his methods, and described themselves as the "silent majority", used the annual general meeting of the school's parents' association in early November to campaign for Önaç's reinstatement, but the following week, on 17 November, the school announced Önaç would be leaving the school in December 2017, "for personal reasons". Freedom of Information requests revealed that 72 students had been forced out of the school during their A-level studies since Önaç became head in the 2010–2011 academic year.

The report of Bromley council's independent inquiry, led by educationalist Christine Whatford, was published in July 2018, and accused St Olave's of illegally treating its students as "collateral damage" in the pursuit of its own interests. It called for a root and branch makeover at the school after exposing multiple cases of maladministration, and urged the school to scrap its policy of restricting access to the upper sixth form. The report also questioned Önaç's claims that he did not know the exclusions were potentially illegal, and criticised the school's financial management. The report also investigated suggestions of bullying, and in particular that Önaç had forced governors from the governing board via a reconstitution, in which five governors who disagreed with him were removed. The report concluded "that is a view with which the investigator concurs."

On 11-14 September 2023 a Teaching Regulation Agency teacher misconduct hearing was held regarding Önaç's tenure at St Olave's. Önaç admitted to acting against government guidelines and Section 434 of the Education Act in excluding students from entering sixth form, but denied allegations of misconduct. The panel found Önaç was guilty of serious misconduct "which fell significantly short of the standards expected of the profession", amounting to "unacceptable professional conduct". The panel decided not to recommend a prohibition order against teaching, which was affirmed by the Secretary of State.
