= Leon Bagrit =

British businessman

Sir Leon Bagrit
- Bagrit in 1955
- Born: 13 March 1902; Kiev, Russian Empire
- Died: 22 April 1979 (aged 77)
- Occupation: Industrialist
- Known for: As a pioneer of automation

Sir Leon Bagrit (13 March 1902 – 22 April 1979) was a leading British industrialist and pioneer of automation.

== Early life and education ==
Born to Jewish parents in Kiev, in the Russian Empire (present-day Ukraine), Sir Leon studied law at Birkbeck College in the University of London, formed his own company in 1935, and for many years headed the revamped firm of Elliott-Automation Ltd., which, outside the United States, was the largest computer manufacturer in the world.

== Career ==
Leon Bagrit was a member of the Council for Scientific and Industrial Research, 1963–1965 and the Advisory Council on Technology, 1964–1979. He was a director of the Royal Opera House, Covent Garden, 1962–1970. He founded the Friends of Covent Garden, and chaired it, 1962–1969. In 1964, he was invited by the BBC to present the Reith Lectures. Across six broadcasts, titled The Age of Automation, he explored how the increased technological development of the time would change people's lifestyles, and the wider world.

Due to the generosity of the Bagrit Trust, a dedicated building, the Sir Leon Bagrit Centre, was opened in the summer of 1991. This Centre formed a cornerstone of the Department of Bioengineering at Imperial College London and the next step in the development of bioengineering at Imperial.

He is buried at Willesden Jewish Cemetery.

== See also ==
- List of Jews born in the Russian Empire and the Soviet Union
- List of British Jews
- List of Ukrainian Jews
- List of Old Olavians
- Who was Who
- Oxford Dictionary of National Biography
