= William Heberden the Younger =

British physician (1767–1845)

- Born: 23 March 1767
- Died: 19 February 1845 (aged 77)
- Education: St John's College, Oxford; Charterhouse School
- Occupation: physician
- Partner: Elizabeth Catherine Miller in 1795
- Parents: William Heberden, the elder (father); Mary Wollaston (mother)

William Heberden the Younger (23 March 1767 – 19 February 1845) was a British physician.

He was born in London the son of the medical doctor William Heberden the Elder and his wife Mary Wollaston. He was educated at Charterhouse School and St John's College, Oxford and followed his father into medicine becoming the Physician at St George's Hospital (1793–1803) and Physician in Ordinary to the Queen (1806) and to George III (1809).

He was elected a Fellow of the Royal Society in 1791.

He lived at 2 Upper Brook Street, Mayfair from 1815 to 1820.

He died in 1845, and was buried in the family vault at Windsor. He had married Elizabeth Catherine Miller in 1795; they had at least nine children.
