= Desmond Pond =

British psychiatrist

Sir Desmond Arthur Pond (2 September 1919 – 29 June 1986) was a British psychiatrist.

He was born the son of electrical engineer Thomas Pond in Catford, London and educated at the John Lyon School in Harrow and at St Olave's Grammar School in Orpington in Kent. He graduated from Clare College, Cambridge, in both Natural and Moral Sciences and trained in Medicine at University College Hospital and at Duke University School of Medicine, North Carolina.

His primary interest was in psychiatry and from 1948 to 1952 he was Senior Lecturer in the Department of Neurophysiology at Maudsley Hospital. From 1952 to 1966 he was consultant psychiatrist at Maudsley and University College Hospitals. In 1966 he was appointed the first Professor of Psychiatry at the London Hospital. He was a founder member of the Institute of Religion and Medicine in 1964.

His efforts helped to establish the role of psychiatry in general practice and his contributions were recognised by the award of honorary fellowship of the Royal College of General Practitioners.

Pond served on the Neurosciences Board of the Medical Research Council from 1968 to 1972 and President of the Royal College of Psychiatrists from 1978 to 1981. He was knighted in 1981. Finally he served as Chief Scientist at the Department of Health and Social Security from 1982, until his retirement in 1985.

He delivered the Goulstonian Lecture to the Royal College of Physicians in 1961 on the subject of the Psychiatric Aspects of Epileptic Brain-damaged Children.

He married physician Helen Jordan, and the couple had three daughters. Pond died of cancer, in Torquay, in 1986.
