= David Akinluyi =

- Born: David Akinluyi; 10 February 1984 (age 42) Ilesa, Nigeria
- School: Saint Olave's Grammar School
- University: University of Cambridge

Rugby union career
- Position: Wing
Senior career
Years	Team	Apps	(Points)
- Northampton Saints

David Akinluyi (born 10 February 1984, in Ilesa, Nigeria) is a rugby union footballer who played on the wing for the Northampton Saints.

== Career ==
Akinluyi played rugby while a pupil at St Olave's Grammar School and then at the University of Cambridge. He scored a try for Cambridge in the Varsity Match against Oxford in 2005.

Although not unusual for an ex-professional to play in a varsity match, Akinluyi was controversially picked to play for Cambridge in the December 2006 fixture despite the fact that he was a full-time professional. He was, however, removed from the team sheet the afternoon before the game. His younger brother Didi Akinluyi played for Cambridge in the U21 varsity game that year

Due to a variety of injuries he left Northampton in 2007 without ever making his full debut Since then he has joined Oliver Wyman, a management consultancy specialising in the financial sector.

He played for Old Olavians RFC from 2007 to 2009 before joining the Birmingham and Solihull Bees on a non-contract basis for the 2009/2010.

He has been selected in the Help for Heroes squad for the 2009 Middlesex Sevens (as David Akinlui)

He is in the 2009/2010 England Sevens Training Squad

He is the current Captain of the Nigerian national team.
