= George Bullen (librarian) =

Librarian at the British Museum

George Bullen (1816, 17 or 18 – 1894) was a librarian and Keeper of Printed Books at the British Museum.

== Early life ==
George Bullen was born in Ireland, probably at Clonakilty, one of three known sons (and three daughters) of Walter Bullen, a customs officer, and his wife, Anne. He is recorded as being born on 27 November 1816 or 1817, however the inscription on his gravestone has him dying in October 1894, aged 76.

He was educated at St Saviour's Grammar School, Southwark, in London and after initially giving private tuition he joined the British Museum in 1838 as a supernumerary assistant in the Department of Printed Books, where he would work for over fifty years. His arrival coincided with the Library's move into its new building in Bloomsbury and one of his earliest tasks was to assist in arranging the books on the shelves.

== Career ==
Bullen became a Permanent Assistant in 1849, in 1866 he became one of two Assistant Keepers of the Department of Printed Books (also becoming superintendent of the Reading Room) and in 1875 he became Keeper of Printed Books, a post he was to hold for fifteen years. On his retirement as Keeper in 1890 he was succeeded by Richard Garnett.

Bullen was said to have had a genial temper. He was a regular contributor to The Athenaeum and was a vice-president of the Library Association, taking a prominent part in many of its annual congresses. He was elected a fellow of the Society of Antiquaries in 1877 and received an honorary degree from the University of Glasgow in 1889. He was created CB in 1890.

== Personal life ==
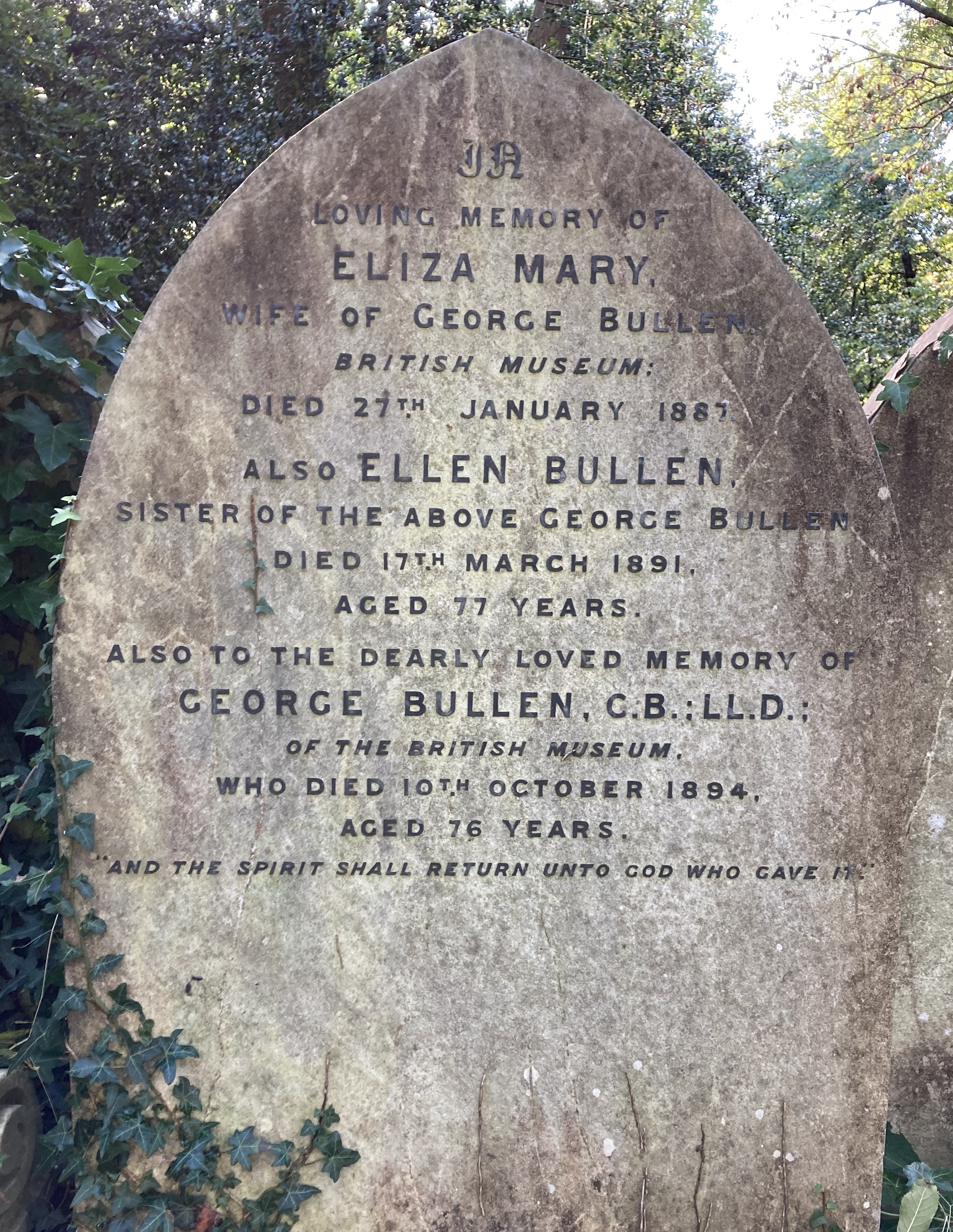
Family Grave of George Bullen (librarian) in Highgate Cemetery

He married Eliza Mary Martin (1823/4–1887) on 10 May 1851 at St George's, Bloomsbury and they had at least two sons, one of whom, Arthur (1857–1920), became a successful editor of Elizabethan works and a publisher. The year after Eliza's death he married Amy Reynolds (1862/3-1954), the daughter of a Bristol iron merchant.

Bullen died at his house, 62 Abingdon Road, Kensington, on 10 October 1894, and was buried with his first wife and one of his sisters on the east side of Highgate Cemetery.

== Sources ==
Sidney Lee's article, revised by P. R. Harris, in the Dictionary of National Biography (2004)
