= Reith Lectures =

Series of annual radio lectures broadcast by the BBC

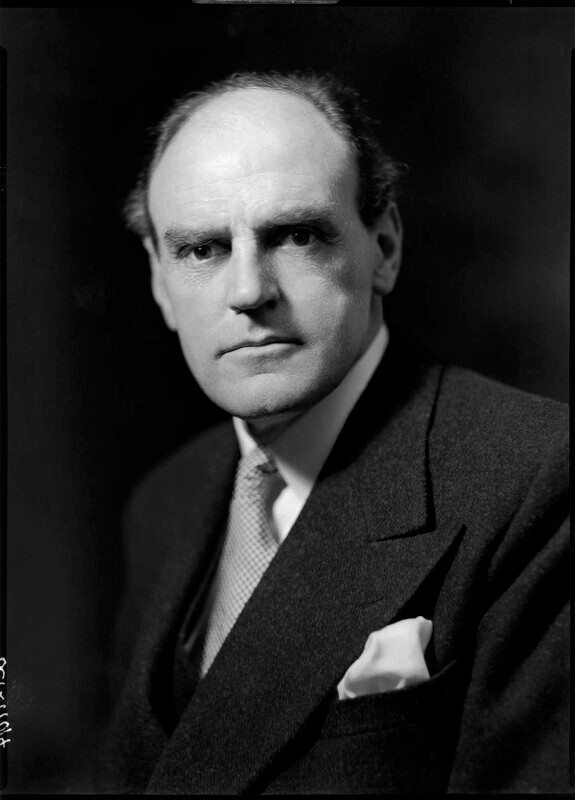
The Reith Lectures are named in honour of John Reith, 1st Baron Reith, the BBC's first director-general

The Reith Lectures is a series of annual BBC radio lectures given by leading figures of the day. They are commissioned by the BBC and broadcast on Radio 4 and the World Service. The lectures were inaugurated in 1948 to mark the historic contribution made to public service broadcasting by Lord Reith, the corporation's first director-general.

Reith maintained that broadcasting should be a public service that aimed to enrich the intellectual and cultural life of the nation. It is in this spirit that the BBC each year invites a leading figure to deliver the lectures. The aim is to advance public understanding and debate about issues of contemporary interest.

The first Reith lecturer was the philosopher and later Nobel laureate, Bertrand Russell. The first female lecturer was Dame Margery Perham in 1961. The youngest Reith lecturer was Colin Blakemore, who was 32 in 1976 when he broadcast over six episodes on the brain and consciousness.

== The Reith Lectures archive ==
Excerpt from a lecture
Part of a lecture by Martin Rees, recorded June 2010

In June 2011 BBC Radio 4 published its Reith Lectures archive. This included two podcasts featuring over 240 lectures from 1948 to the present day as well as streamed online audio, and the complete written transcripts of the entire Reith Lectures archive:

- Podcast 1: Archive 1948–1975
- Podcast 2: Archive 1976–2012
- Transcripts 1948–2010
- In pictures

The BBC found that some of the audio archive of the Reith Lectures was missing from its library and appealed to the public for copies of the missing lectures.

== The Reith Lectures 1948–2026 ==
=== 1940s ===
- 1948 Bertrand Russell, "Authority and the Individual"
- 1949 Robert Birley, "Britain in Europe"

=== 1950s ===
- 1950 John Zachary Young, "Doubt and Certainty in Science"
- 1951 Lord Radcliffe, "Power and the State"
- 1952 Arnold J. Toynbee, "The World and the West"
- 1953 J. Robert Oppenheimer, "Science and the Common Understanding"
- 1954 Oliver Franks, "Britain and the Tide of World Affairs"
- 1955 Nikolaus Pevsner, "The Englishness of English Art"
- 1956 Edward Victor Appleton, "Science and the Nation"
- 1957 George F. Kennan, "Russia, the Atom and the West"
- 1958 Bernard Lovell, "The Individual and the Universe"
- 1959 Peter Medawar, "The Future of Man"

=== 1960s ===
- 1960 Edgar Wind, "Art and Anarchy"
- 1961 Margery Perham, "The Colonial Reckoning"
- 1962 George Carstairs, "This Island Now"
- 1963 Albert Sloman, "A University in the Making"
- 1964 Leon Bagrit, "The Age of Automation"
- 1965 Robert Gardiner, "World of Peoples"
- 1966 John K. Galbraith, "The New Industrial State"
- 1967 Edmund Leach, "A Runaway World"
- 1968 Lester B. Pearson, "In the Family of Man"
- 1969 Frank Fraser Darling, "Wilderness and Plenty"

=== 1970s ===
- 1970 Donald Schön, "Change and Industrial Society"
- 1971 Richard Hoggart, "Only Connect"
- 1972 Andrew Shonfield, "Europe: Journey to an Unknown Destination"
- 1973 Alastair Buchan, "Change Without War"
- 1974 Ralf Dahrendorf, "The New Liberty"
- 1975 Daniel J. Boorstin, "America and the World Experience"
- 1976 Colin Blakemore, "Mechanics of the Mind"
- 1977 A. H. Halsey, "Change in British Society"
- 1978 Edward Norman, "Christianity and the World"
- 1979 Ali Mazrui, "The African Condition"

=== 1980s ===
- 1980 Professor Sir Ian Kennedy, "Unmasking Medicine"
- 1981 Laurence Martin, "The Two Edged Sword"
- 1982 Denis Donoghue, "The Arts Without Mystery"
- 1983 Douglas Wass, "Government and the Governed"
- 1984 John Searle, "Minds, Brains and Science"
- 1985 David Henderson, "Innocence and Design"
- 1986 Lord McCluskey, "Law, Justice and Democracy"
- 1987 Alexander Goehr, "The Survival of the Symphony"
- 1988 Geoffrey Hosking, "The Rediscovery of Politics"
- 1989 Jacques Darras, "Beyond the Tunnel of History"

=== 1990s ===
- 1990 Jonathan Sacks, "The Persistence of Faith"
- 1991 Steve Jones, "The Language of Genes"
- There was no lecture in 1992 because "the BBC simply couldn't find anyone to do them"
- 1993 Edward Said, "Representation of the Intellectual"
- 1994 Marina Warner, "Managing Monsters"
- 1995 Richard Rogers, "Sustainable City"
- 1996 Jean Aitchison, "The Language Web"
- 1997 Patricia J. Williams, "The Genealogy of Race"
- 1998 John Keegan, "War in Our World"
- 1999 Anthony Giddens, "The Runaway World"

=== 2000s ===
- 2000 Chris Patten, Sir John Browne, Thomas Lovejoy, Gro Harlem Brundtland, Vandana Shiva, Charles, Prince of Wales, "Respect for the Earth"
- 2001 Tom Kirkwood, "The End of Age"
- 2002 Onora O'Neill, "A Question of Trust?"
- 2003 V. S. Ramachandran, "The Emerging Mind"
- 2004 Wole Soyinka, "Climate of Fear"
- 2005 Lord Broers, "The Triumph of Technology"
- 2006 Daniel Barenboim, "In the Beginning was Sound"
- 2007 Jeffrey Sachs, "Bursting at the Seams"
- 2008 Professor Jonathan Spence, "Chinese Vistas"
- 2009 Michael Sandel, "A New Citizenship"

=== 2010s ===
- 2010 Martin Rees, "Scientific Horizons"
- 2011 Aung San Suu Kyi and Baroness Manningham-Buller, "Securing Freedom"
- 2012 Niall Ferguson, "The Rule of Law and Its Enemies"
- 2013 Grayson Perry, "Playing to the Gallery"
- 2014 Atul Gawande, "The Future of Medicine"
- 2016 (March) Stephen Hawking, "Do Black Holes Have No Hair?"
- 2016 (October) Kwame Anthony Appiah, "Mistaken Identities"
- 2017 Hilary Mantel, "Resurrection: The Art and Craft"
- 2018 Margaret MacMillan, "The Mark of Cain"
- 2019 Jonathan Sumption, "Law and the Decline of Politics"

=== 2020s ===
- 2020 Mark Carney, "How We Get What We Value—from Moral to Market Sentiments"
- 2021 Stuart J. Russell, "Living with Artificial Intelligence"
- 2022 Chimamanda Ngozi Adichie, "Freedom of Speech"; Rowan Williams, "Freedom of Worship"; Darren McGarvey, "Freedom from Want"; Fiona Hill, "Freedom from Fear" (theme: "The Four Freedoms")
- 2023 Ben Ansell, "Our Democratic Future"
- 2024 Gwen Adshead, "Four Questions About Violence"
- 2025 Rutger Bregman, "Moral Revolution"
- 2026 Robert McFarlane, 'The Human Superiority Complex'

== Censorship ==
Rutger Bregman's intended statement in his 2025 lecture that Donald Trump was the "most openly corrupt president in American history" was censored by the BBC upon advice of its lawyers prior to the broadcast. The BBC forbid its staff from quoting the censored line in communication with the media.

== See also ==
- Boyer Lectures
- Massey Lectures

== Notes ==
1.Stephen Hawking's lecture was postponed because of illness.
