= William Heberden =

English physician (1710–1801)

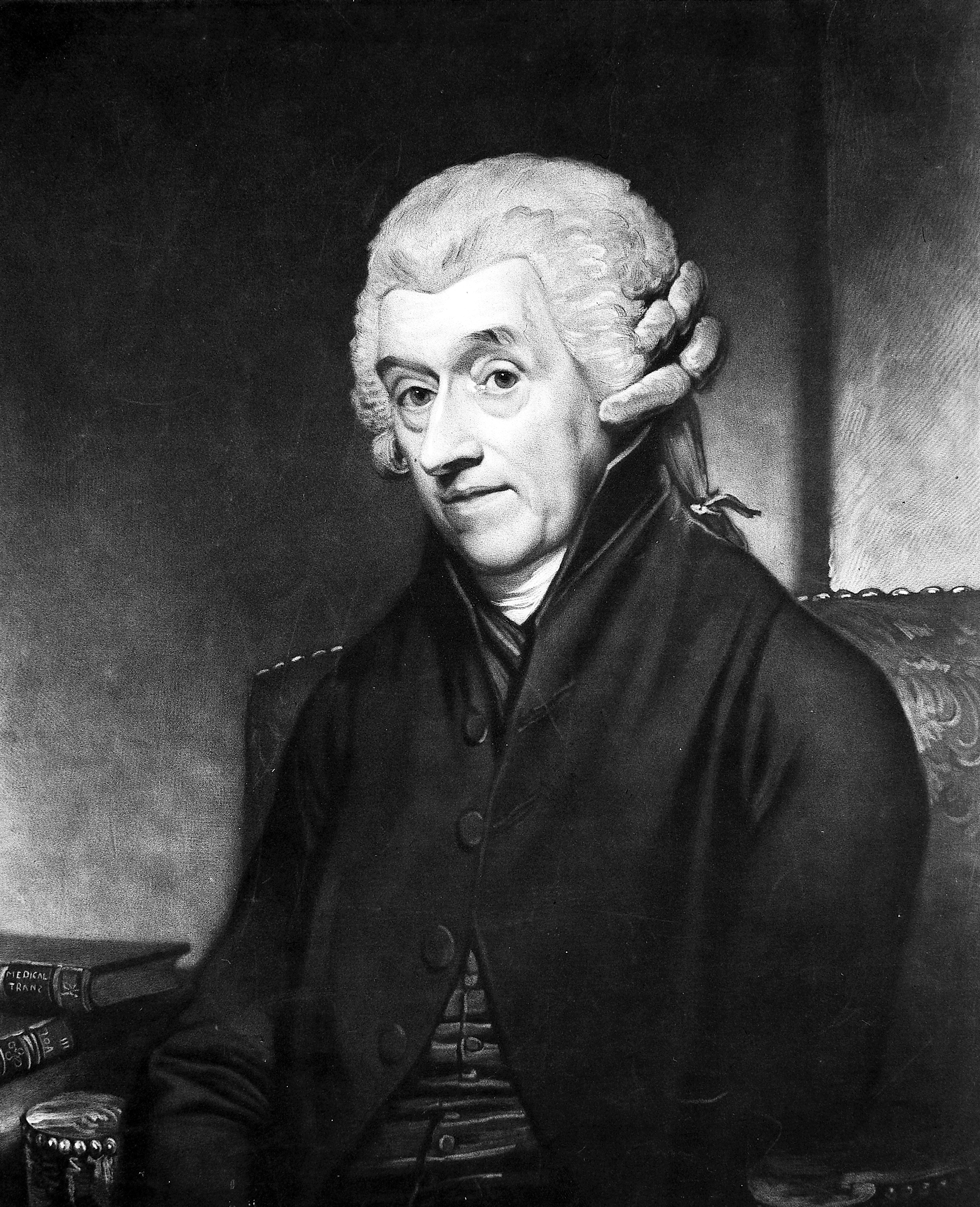
- Born: 13 August 1710; London, England
- Died: 17 May 1801 (aged 90)
- Education: St John's College, Cambridge
- Scientific career
- Fields: Medicine

William Heberden FRS (13 August 1710 – 17 May 1801) was an English physician.

== Life ==
He was born in London, where he received the early part of his education at St Saviour's Grammar School. At the end of 1724 he was sent to St John's College, Cambridge, where he obtained a fellowship, around 1730, became Master of Arts in 1732, and took the degree of MD in 1739. He remained at Cambridge nearly ten years longer practicing medicine, and gave an annual course of lectures on materia medica. In 1746 he became a fellow of the Royal College of Physicians in London; and two years later he settled in London, where he was elected a fellow of the Royal Society in 1749, and enjoyed an extensive medical practice for more than thirty years.

At the age of seventy-two he partially retired, spending his summers at a house he had taken at Windsor, but he continued to practice in London during the winter for some years longer. In 1778 he was made an honorary member of the Paris Royal Society of Medicine.

In 1766, he recommended to the College of Physicians the first design of the Medical Transactions, in which he proposed to collect together such observations as might have occurred to any of their body, and were likely to illustrate the history or cure of diseases. The plan was soon adopted, and three volumes (were) successively laid before the public.

His tomb in Windsor Parish Church is by John Bacon.

== Works ==
William Heberden, who was also a classical scholar, published several papers in the Philosophical Transactions of the Royal Society; and among his noteworthy contributions to the Medical Transactions (issued, largely at his suggestion, by the College of Physicians) were papers on chickenpox (1767) and angina pectoris (1768). His Commentarii de morborum historia et curatione, the result of notes made in his pocket-book at the bedside of his patients, were published in 1802 and again in 1807. In the year following the first edition, an English translation appeared, with a 3rd edition in 1806, and further publication in 1818. The English translations are believed to be from the pen of his son, William Heberden (1767–1845), also a distinguished scholar and physician, who attended King George III in his last illness. The eponymous Heberden's nodes of osteoarthritis are named after William Heberden senior, who included a chapter on arthritis in his Commentaries on The History and Cure of Diseases.

== Wives and children ==
He married twice. First to Elizabeth Martin in 1752, with whom he had one son Thomas (1754–1843), later Canon of Exeter, but she died in 1754. He remarried to Mary Wollaston, daughter of Francis Wollaston (1694–1774), and had a further eight children, of whom only two survived their father, one being William Heberden the Younger (1767–1845), who followed his father into medicine, and the other Mary (1763–1832) who married the Rev George Leonard Jenyns.
