= Samuel Laman Blanchard =

British author and journalist

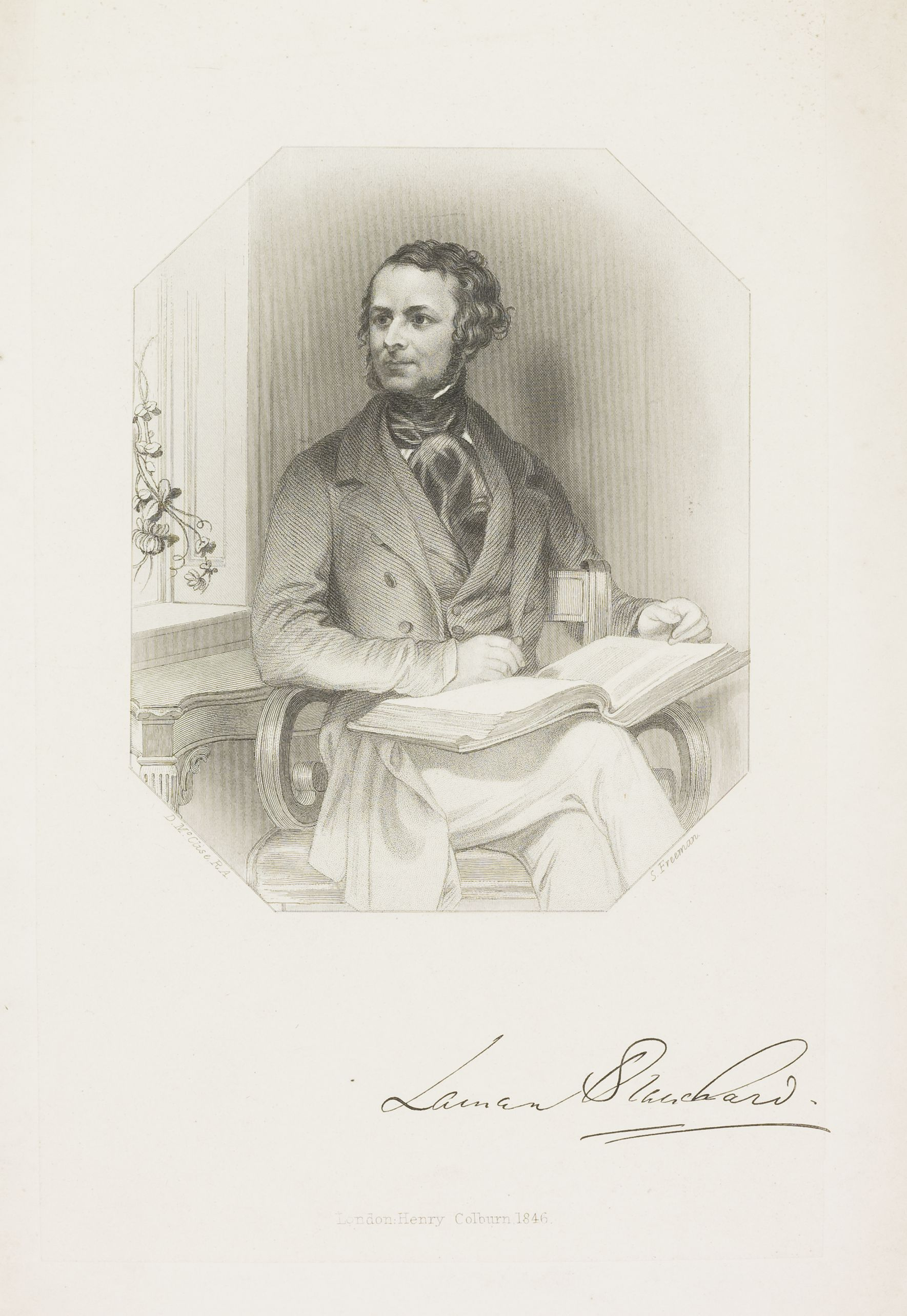
Laman Blanchard

Samuel Laman Blanchard (15 May 1804 – 15 February 1845) was a British author and journalist.

== Life ==
The son of a painter and glazier, he was born at Great Yarmouth. He was educated at St Olave's school, Southwark, and then became clerk to a proctor in Doctors' Commons. At an early age he developed an interest in literature, contributing dramatic sketches to a paper called Drama. For a short time he belonged to a travelling theatre company, but then became a proof-reader in London, and wrote for the Monthly Magazine. In 1827 he was made secretary of the Zoological Society, a post he held for three years.

Over-work broke down his strength and, after his wife died in December 1844 of a painful illness, Blanchard entered a depression from which he never recovered. He committed suicide with a razor, and was buried at West Norwood Cemetery.

== Works ==
In 1828 he published Lyric Offerings, dedicated to Charles Lamb. He had a very varied journalistic experience, editing in succession the Monthly Magazine, the True Sun, the Constitutional, the Court Journal, the Courier, and George Cruikshank's Omnibus; and from 1841 until his death he was connected with the Examiner.

In 1846 Edward Bulwer-Lytton collected some of his prose-essays under the title Sketches of Life, to which a memoir of the author was prefixed. His verse was collected in 1876 by William Blanchard Jerrold.

== Family ==
His eldest son was Sidney Laman Blanchard, the author of Yesterday and To-day in India.
