= List of people associated with Lady Margaret Hall, Oxford =

This is a list of notable people associated with Lady Margaret Hall, Oxford, including members (alumni) and academics.

== Notable members ==
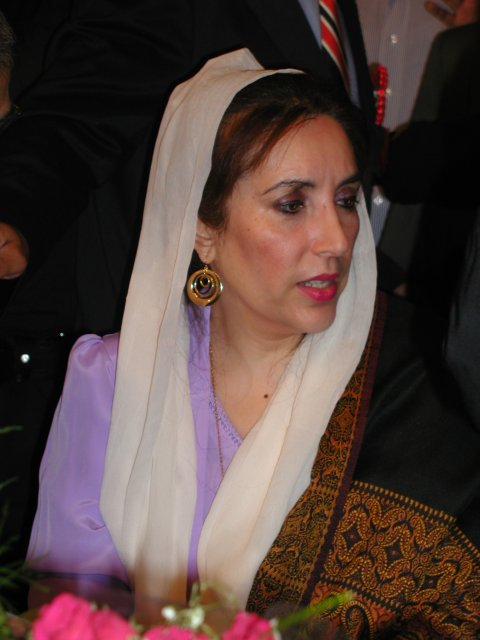
Benazir Bhutto, former Prime Minister of Pakistan

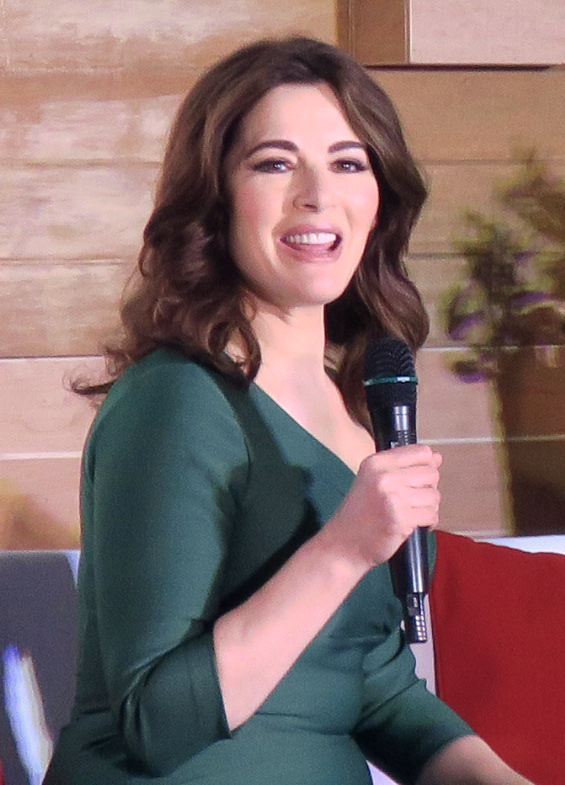
Nigella Lawson, journalist and food writer

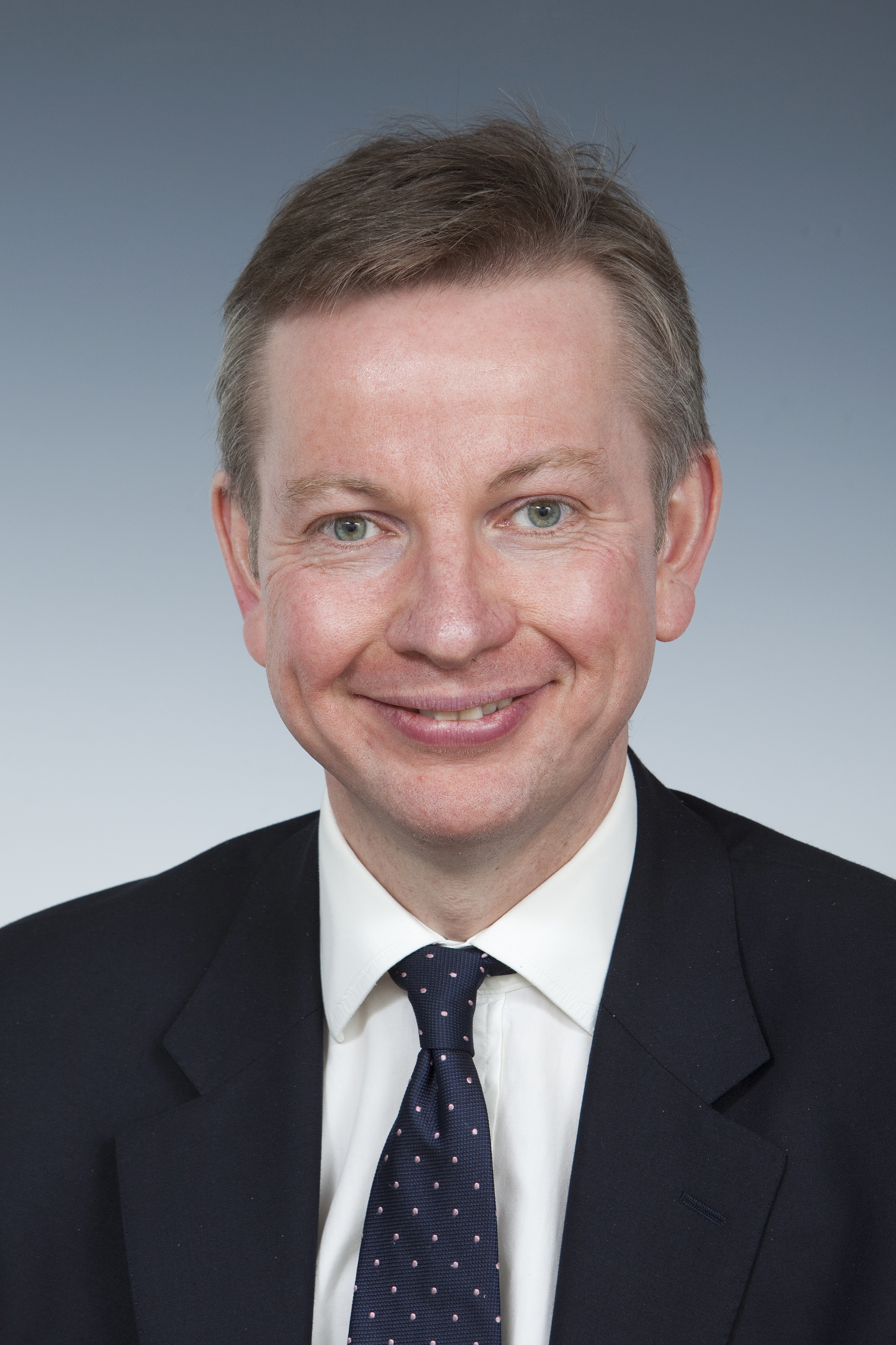
Michael Gove, politician

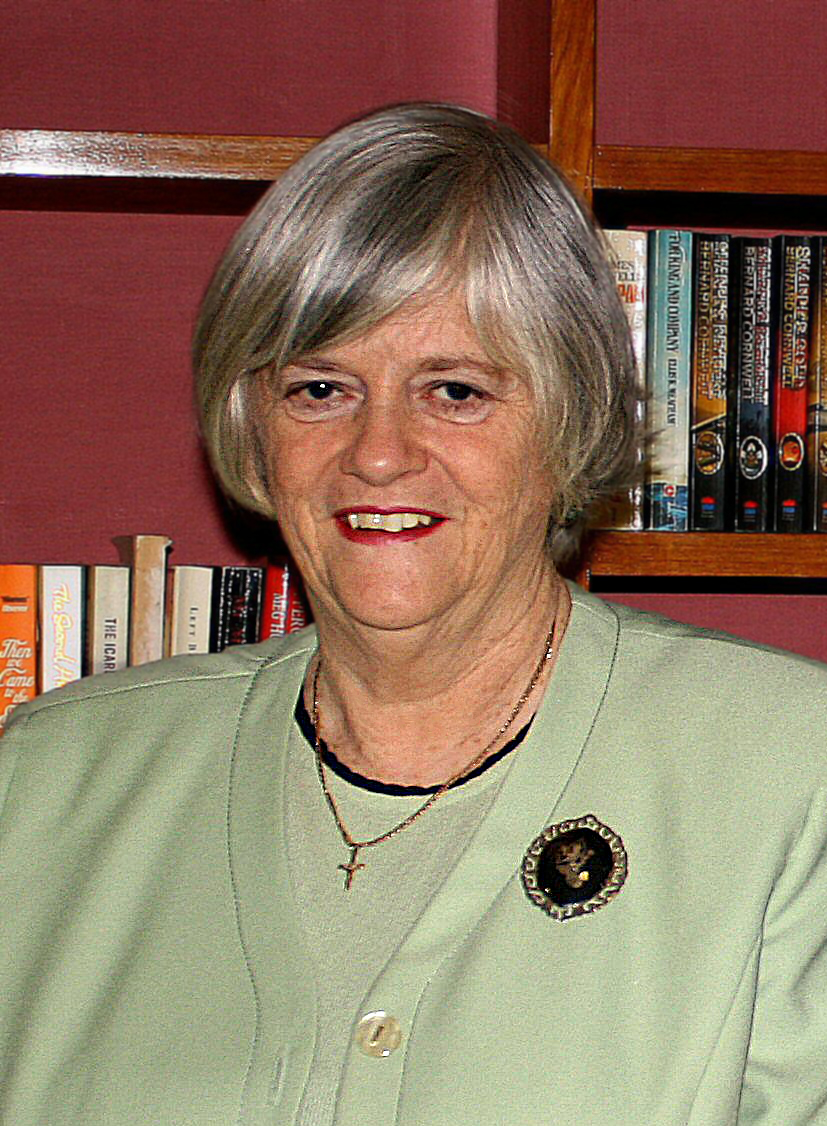
Ann Widdecombe, politician

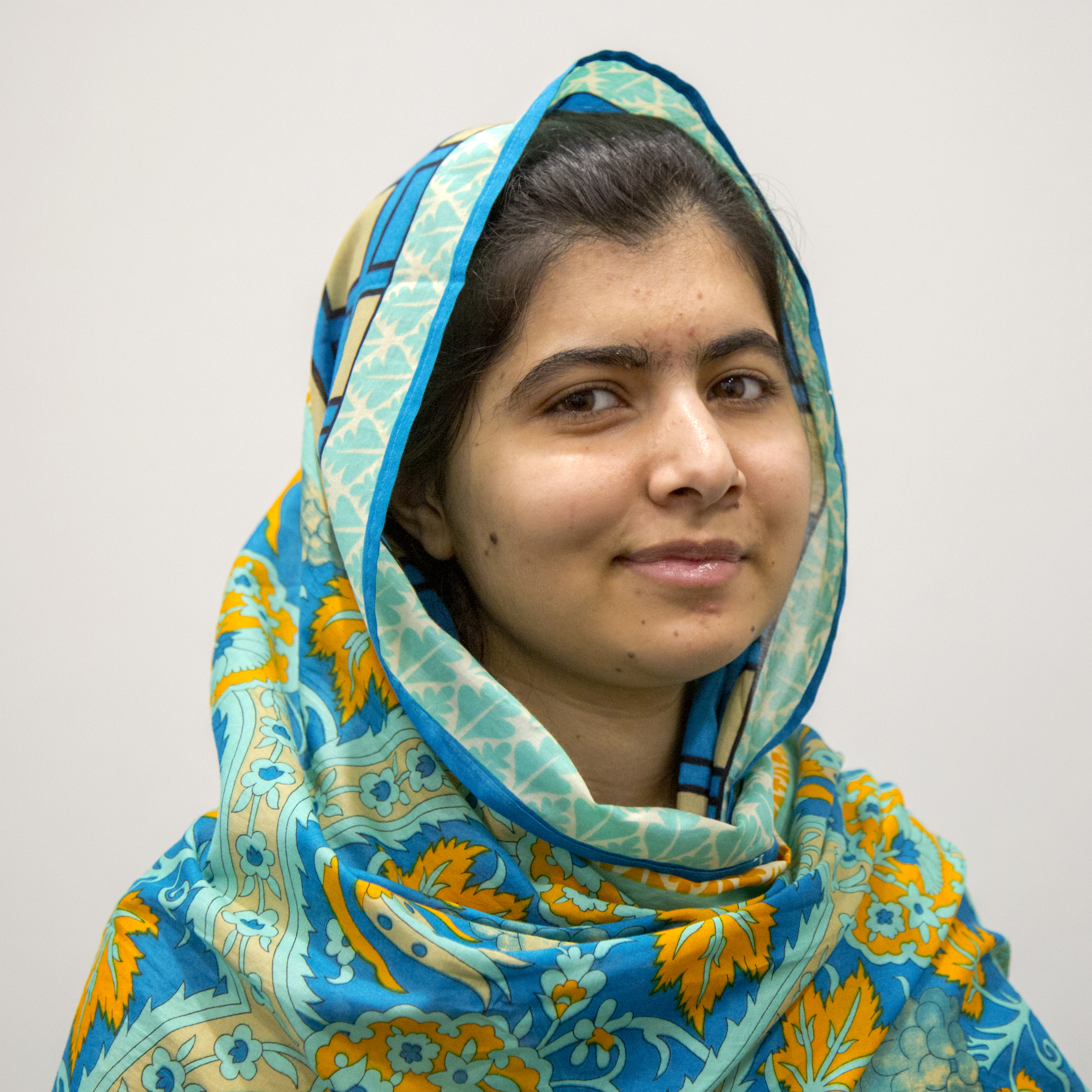
Malala Yousafzai, Nobel Peace Prize winner and female education activist

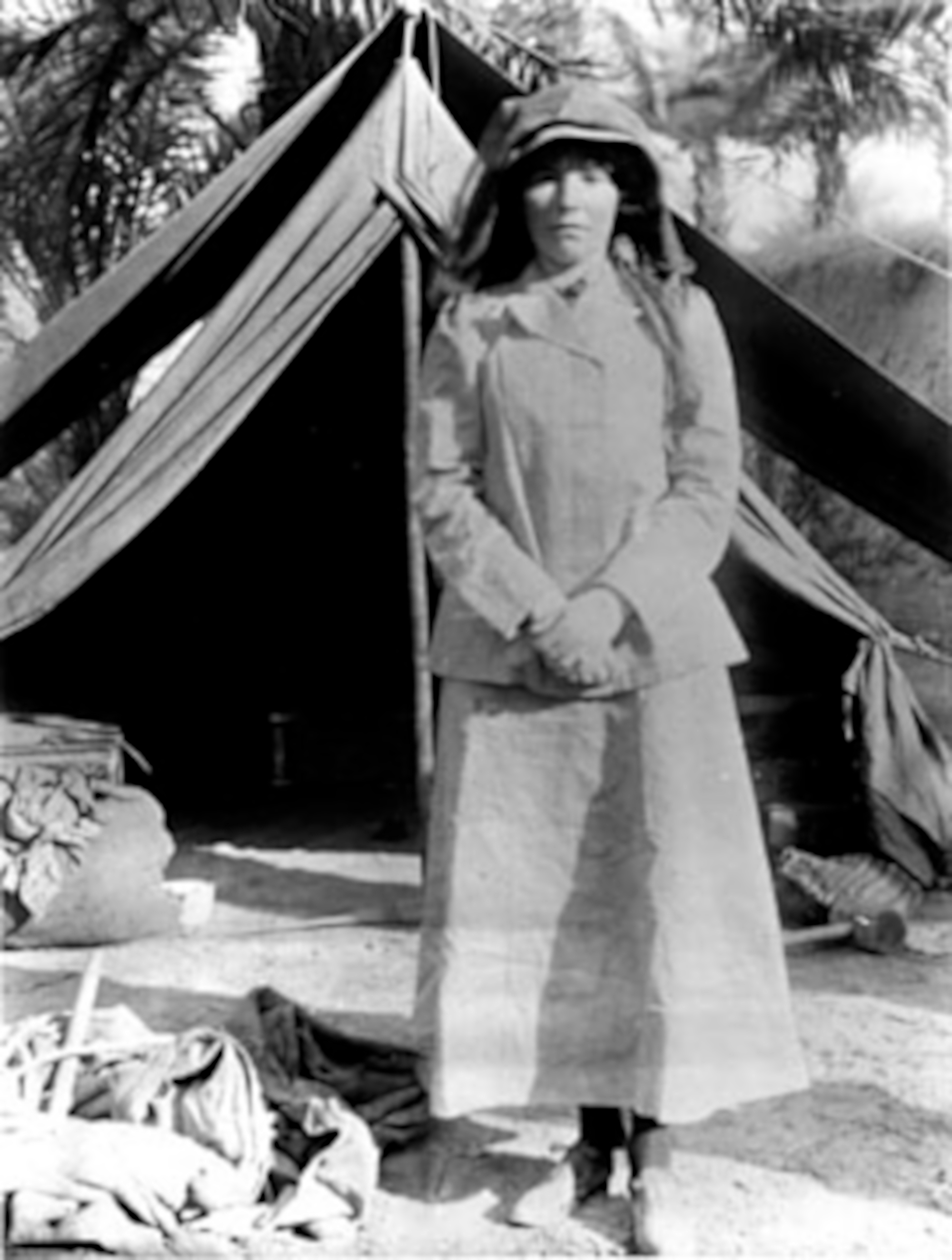
Gertrude Bell, traveller

Alumni of the college (who are termed Senior Members) include:

- James Allen, Formula One commentator
- Diana Athill, publisher's editor
- Harriett Baldwin, Conservative MP
- Mary Creighton Bailey, educator
- Gertrude Bell, writer and diplomat
- Nora Beloff, journalist and political writer
- Benazir Bhutto, former prime minister of Pakistan
- Elisabeth Blochmann, educationalist
- Katharine Mary Briggs, writer
- Guy Browning, author and humorist
- Caryl Churchill, playwright
- Danny Cohen, former Controller of BBC One
- Charles C. W. Cooke, journalist and broadcaster
- Donal Coonan, presenter
- Margaret Costa, food writer
- Lindsey Davis, novelist
- Vivien Duffield, philanthropist
- Katharine Esdaile, art historian
- Neil Ferguson, epidemiologist
- Amanda Foreman, historian
- Antonia Fraser, writer
- Michael Gove, politician
- Eric Greitens, 56th Governor of Missouri, author, former Rhodes Scholar and Navy SEAL, founder of The Mission Continues
- Alethea Hayter, author
- Stephen Hester, former CEO of RBS
- Tim Hetherington, photojournalist
- Baroness Hogg, journalist
- George Hollingbery, politician
- Philip Hollobone, politician
- Richard Howitt, politician
- Eglantyne Jebb, founder of Save the Children
- Charlotte Johnson Wahl, artist
- Matthew Floyd Jones, musician
- Lucy Kellaway, journalist
- Bridget Kendall, BBC diplomatic correspondent
- Joanna Kennedy, civil engineer
- Francis Lannon, historian and former Principal of Lady Margaret Hall
- Nigella Lawson, journalist and celebrity television cooking show presenter
- Ann Leslie, journalist
- Goodwin Liu, Associate Justice of the Supreme Court of California, former Rhodes Scholar
- Josie Long, comedian
- Elizabeth Longford, writer
- Elinor Lyon, children's writer
- Eliza Manningham-Buller, former director general of MI5
- Sujata Manohar, former Judge of the Supreme Court of India
- Simon Mason, author of juvenile and adult fiction
- Lucasta Miller, writer and critic
- Barbara Mills, former Director of Public Prosecutions
- Priscilla Napier, author
- Pauline Neville-Jones, former Minister of State for Security and Counter Terrorism
- Cathy Newman, Channel 4 News presenter and journalist
- Jean Orr-Ewing, pathologist, part of the Oxford penicillin team
- Michelle Paver, author
- H. F. M. Prescott, historian
- Diana Quick, actress
- Dominic Raab, politician
- Margaret Rawlings, actress
- Johnny Rogan, author and broadcaster
- Victoria Schofield, author
- Frances Stead Sellers, senior writer for The Washington Post
- Conrad Shawcross, artist
- Marie Slocombe, founder of the BBC Sound Archive
- Jeany Spark, actress
- Matthew Taylor, politician
- Ann Trindade, historian
- Anna Walker, British civil servant
- Marina Warner, writer
- Baroness Warnock, philosopher
- Emma Watson, actress
- C. V. Wedgwood, historian
- Samuel West, actor
- Helen Whately, politician
- Ann Widdecombe, politician
- Malala Yousafzai, youngest-ever Nobel Prize laureate, female education activist

== Notable fellows and academics ==
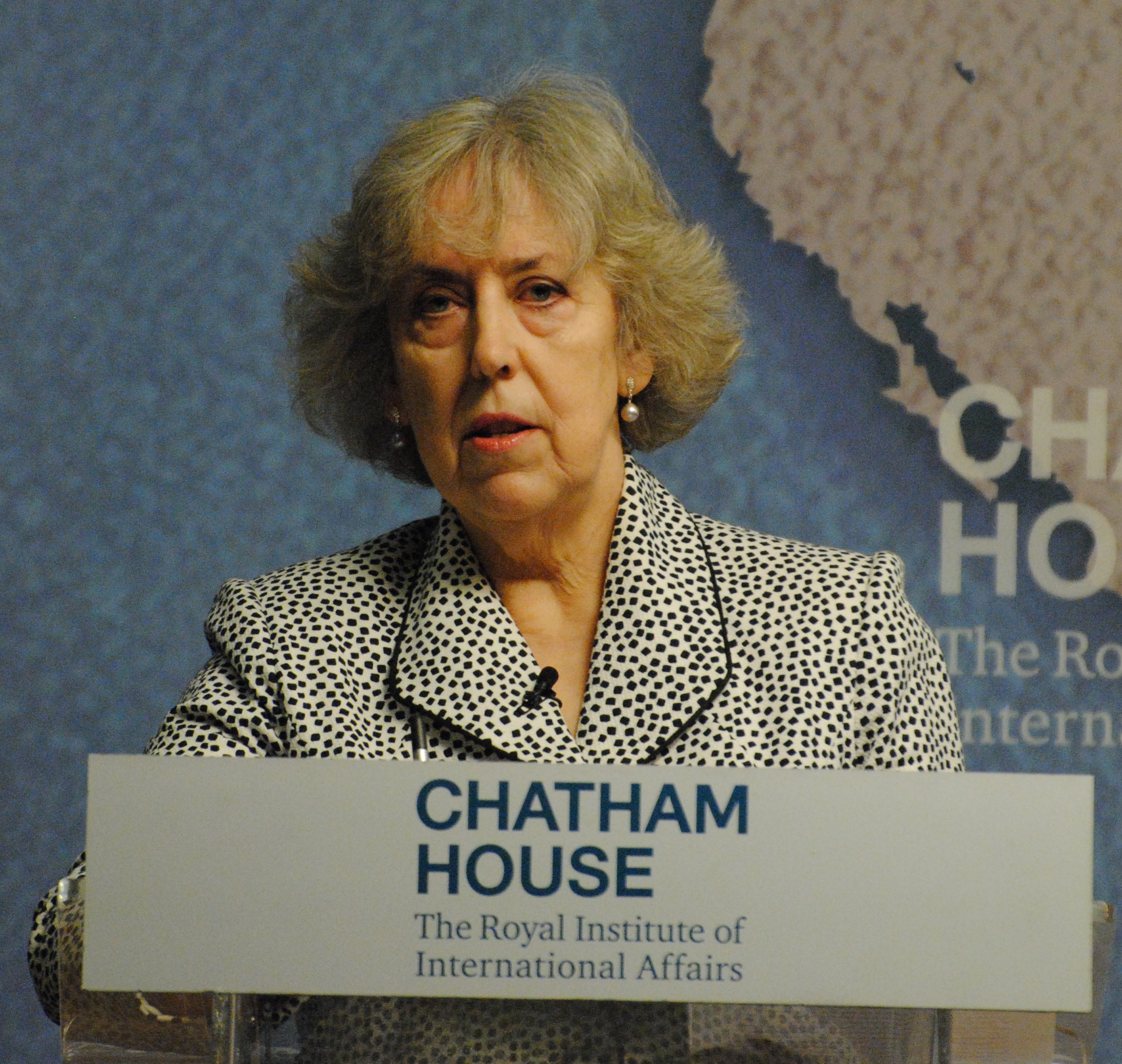
Baroness Manningham-Buller former Director General of MI5, the British internal Security Service is a fellow of the college

Notable fellows of the college include:

- Helen Barr
- Edith Bülbring, scientist in smooth muscle physiology, FRS
- Professor Andrew Burrows, Justice of the UK Supreme Court
- Helena Deneke
- Barbara Hammond
- Dame Francis Lannon
- Baroness Manningham-Buller
- David MacDonald
- Ewan McKendrick
- Jean Orr-Ewing
- Claudio Sillero-Zubiri
- Robert Stevens
- Guy Stroumsa
- Rhoda Sutherland

== Visiting fellows ==
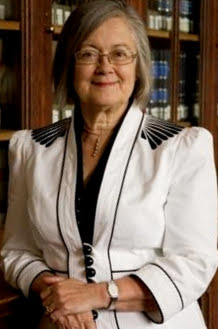
Lady Hale, former President of the UK Supreme Court, one of the visiting fellows of the college

The college has a number of Visiting Fellows. Holders of this non-salaried role are drawn from a variety of backgrounds, callings and professions. These fellowships are for three years and have included:

- Lady Hale
- Emma Watson
- Benedict Cumberbatch
- Gary Lineker
- Malorie Blackman
- Cornelia Parker
- Francis Habgood
- Sir Rabinder Singh
- Mark Simpson
- Jennifer Rohn
- David Olusoga
- Henry Marsh
- Neil Tennant
- Beeban Kidron
- Kwame Kwei-Armah

The fellowships are intended to form a bridge between the academic community and the worlds they inhabit.

== Others ==
- Margaret Deneke, choirmaster and benefactor
