= Coonan =

Coonan is a surname. Notable people with the surname include:

- Helen Coonan (born 1947), Australian politician
- Donal Coonan (born 1981), British internet personality and television presenter
- James Coonan (born 1946), Irish-American gangster
- Daniel Coonan (born 1974), English stage and television actor
- Walter Coonan (1853–1926), Australian actor
