= A. D. Gardner =

British medical researcher (1884–1977)

Arthur Duncan Gardner
- Born: 28 March 1884
- Died: 28 January 1977 (aged 92)
- Education: University College, Oxford
- Occupations: Physician; scientist
- Employer: University College, Oxford
- Known for: Penicillin

Arthur Duncan Gardner, FRCP, FRCS (28 March 1884 – 28 January 1977) was a British physician and scientist known for his contributions to the development of penicillin and his role as the Regius Professor of Medicine at the University of Oxford from 1948 to 1954.

== Early life and education ==
Gardner was born on 28 March 1884. He received his education at Rugby School before enrolling at University College, University of Oxford, initially to study Law. However, after completing his degree, he chose to pursue a career in Medicine, diverging from his family's law practice. In 1911, he qualified as a physician and obtained the FRCS (Fellow of the Royal College of Surgeons) qualification. Gardner then focused on pathology and began publishing scientific papers. During World War I, he briefly served as a Red Cross surgeon. In 1915, he joined the Standards Council in Oxford as a bacteriologist and became a Fellow of University College.

== Contributions to penicillin development ==
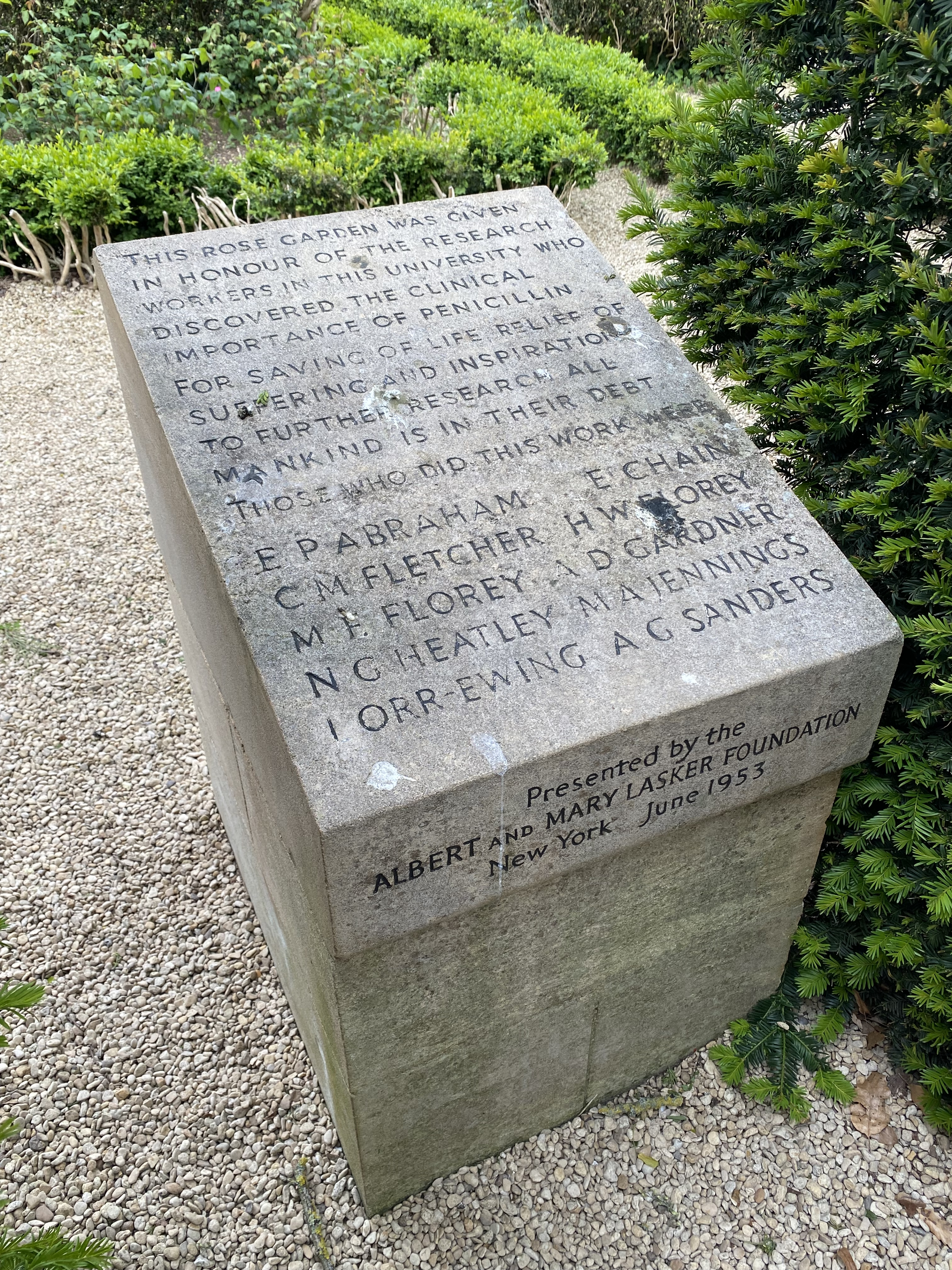
Memorial plinth commemorating scientists who worked on the medical applications of penicillin in the Rose Garden, at the Oxford Botanic Gardens

In 1936, Gardner assumed the position of Professor of Bacteriology under Howard Florey at the Sir William Dunn School of Pathology in Oxford. It was during this time that he became involved in the pioneering penicillin project. Collaborating with Jean Orr-Ewing, Gardner conducted research on the effects of penicillin against various harmful microbes. His investigations revealed that penicillin did not function as an enzyme or antiseptic, as previously believed. Instead, Gardner demonstrated that penicillin caused the targeted microbes to swell, explode, or perish without dividing.

Gardner's name is one of the ten which are inscribed on the memorial plinth commemorating the scientists who worked on the medical applications of penicillin, which was erected in 1953 in the Rose Garden outside the entrance to the University of Oxford Botanic Garden.

== Regius professorship and later life ==
Gardner's significant contributions to medical science, combined with his extensive experience, led to his appointment as the Regius Professor of Medicine at the University of Oxford, a prestigious position bestowed upon him by King George VI. Some skeptics questioned the influence of his friendship with the then-Prime Minister, Clement Attlee, whom Gardner had met during his undergraduate years at University College, as a potential factor in his appointment.

In 1953, Gardner delivered the Rede Lecture at the University of Cambridge, presenting a lecture titled "The Proper Study of Mankind." Following his tenure as Regius Professor of Medicine, he retired to Devon in 1956. Gardner died on 28 January 1977.
