= Alleyn's School =

Private school in Dulwich, London

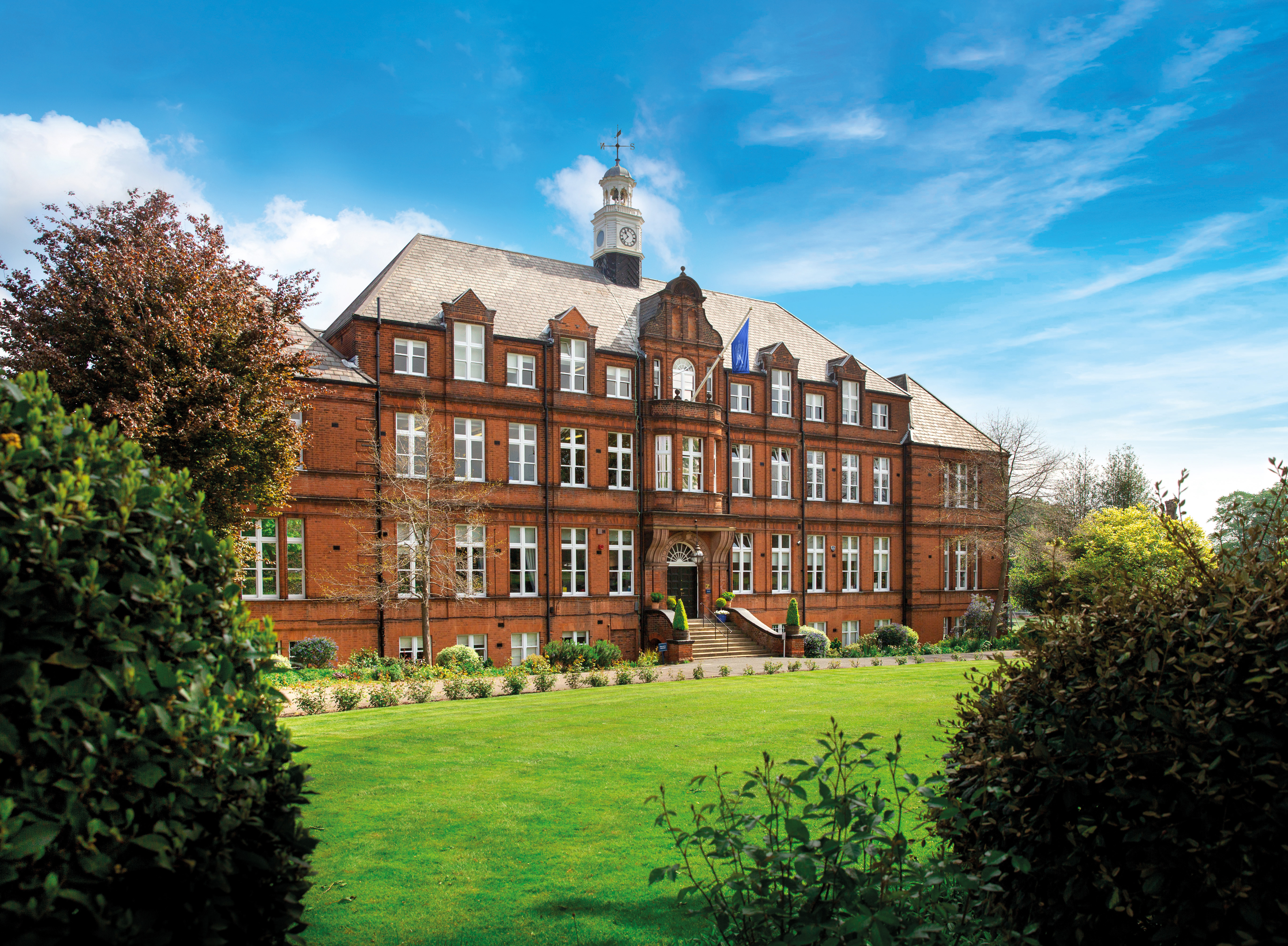
- Alleyn's School

Location
- Townley Road, Dulwich; London, SE22 8SU; England; 51°27′17″N 0°04′55″W

Information
- Type: Private day school Public school
- Motto: All We Can Be
- Religious affiliation: Church of England
- Established: 1619 as part of Edward Alleyn's College of God's Gift, although separated from Dulwich College in 1882
- Founder: Edward Alleyn
- Local authority: Southwark London Borough Council
- Department for Education URN: 100864 Tables
- Head teacher: Jane Lunnon
- Gender: Co-educational
- Age range: 4–18
- Enrolment: 1,252 (2019)
- Capacity: 1,340
- Houses: 8 Brading’s; Brown’s; Cribb’s; Dutton’s; Roper’s; Spurgeon’s; Tulley’s; Tyson’s
- Colours: White and Cornflower Blue
- Publication: Alleyn's On
- Affiliation: College of God's Gift
- Alumni: Alleyn's Old Boys and Girls
- Website: www.alleyns.org.uk
- "Alleyn's School, registered charity no. 1057971". Charity Commission for England and Wales.

Alleyn's School is a 4–18 co-educational, public, day school and sixth form in Dulwich, London, England. It is a registered charity and was originally part of Edward Alleyn's College of God's Gift charitable foundation, which also included James Allen's Girls' School (JAGS) and Dulwich College.

It became a public school with the election of its headmaster to the Headmasters' Conference (HMC) in 1929, but, like Oakham School, subsequently operated as a direct grant grammar school from 1958 until the abolition of that status in 1976, after which its governors opted for outright independence and co-education.

It is very strong academically and usually outperforms its sister school Dulwich College at both GCSE and A-Level.

== History ==
=== Edward Alleyn ===
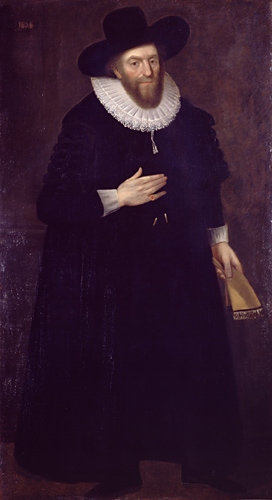
Edward Alleyn, founder of the school

In 1619, Edward Alleyn established his 'College of God's Gift' (the gift of love) accommodating twelve poor brothers and sisters (“pensioners”), plus providing education for a further twelve poor scholars: Alleyn's School is a successor of Edward Alleyn's original foundation, the scholars of which it inherited when it was established as a boys' school in 1882. (Together with Dulwich College, it is also a successor of the original Corporation’s 1842-founded Grammar School.) It still exists as part of a foundation alongside Dulwich College, and JAGS.

For the original College of God's Gift, 24 students had to be chosen from the four parishes with which Edward Alleyn had been connected. Saint Giles, Camberwell (in which Dulwich was situated), Saint Saviour, Southwark (where the Bear Pit stood on Bankside), Saint Botolph, Bishopsgate (where Alleyn was born), and Saint Giles, Cripplegate (home to the Fortune Theatre).

=== The Lower School ===
The 1857 Act for confirming a Scheme of the Charity Commissioners for the College of God's Gift in Dulwich in the County of Surrey, also known as the Dulwich College Act, mandated that the College of God's Gift be wound up, and that “Alleyn’s College of God’s Gift”, its replacement, create an "Upper School", which became Dulwich College, and a "Lower School", which became Alleyn's; both in the further 1882 reorganisation.

=== Separation from the College of God's Gift ===
Reverend J. Henry Smith became the first headmaster of Alleyn's School, having previously been the Master of the Lower School of the College of God's Gift.

In 1869, the upper school moved away to a new site further south (“The New College”), but the lower school remained at “The Old College” and the old Grammar School buildings until 1887, when it moved to its current site which contained new buildings. The original school location is now the foundation chapel and the offices for the Dulwich Estate, which belongs to the two schools.

=== Independence and co-education ===
It became a public school with the election of its headmaster to the Headmasters' Conference (HMC) in 1929, but, like Oakham School, subsequently operated as a direct grant grammar school, from 1958 until the abolition of that status in 1976, after which its governors opted for outright independence and co-education. Their Chairman Lord Wolfenden explained the decision in the House of Lords on 12 November 1975:

As a responsible body of Governors, we were confronted with an extremely difficult decision. The dilemma is this. Should we, as the phrase goes, "take our place within the pattern of the local education authority", or should we, on the other hand, go independent? In relation to the former of those alternatives, there are two relevant considerations. The first is whether the past history and present nature of a school fits in with the overall structure of the pattern of the local education authority for children in the Dulwich area. The answer is that it clearly does not. A long-established grammar school, annually recruited to carry out what has for long been recognised by a substantial number of LEAs as its specific academic purpose, does not easily transform itself overnight into a comprehensive school to serve a limited catchment area. Even if it could do that, with extraordinary metamorphoses of staff and objectives, there is no evidence whatever that any local education authority would be prepared to absorb it. So the dilemma is resolved, your Lordships may say. Yes, but at what cost? Alleyn's School has no option, whatever its wishes might have been, but to go independent.
Doctrines and ideologies apart, what does this mean in real life? It means that there will now be in Dulwich two independent day grammar schools, one of 1,300 boys and the other of 800 boys, within a couple of miles of each other. It also means that in order to maintain Alleyn's as an independent school its fees, with the removal of direct grant, will have to be put up to something like those of its consistently independent neighbour, Dulwich College. What sense does it make to have over 2,000 places in independent boys' grammar schools, at independent school fees, in one district of South London? We, the Governors of Alleyn's 1847 School think it makes no sense at all, so we are intending to make Alleyn's into a co-educational school. Then, in the Dulwich area, there will be an independent boys' school, Dulwich College, an independent girls' school, James Allen's School, and an independent coeducational school, Alleyn's.

== Development ==
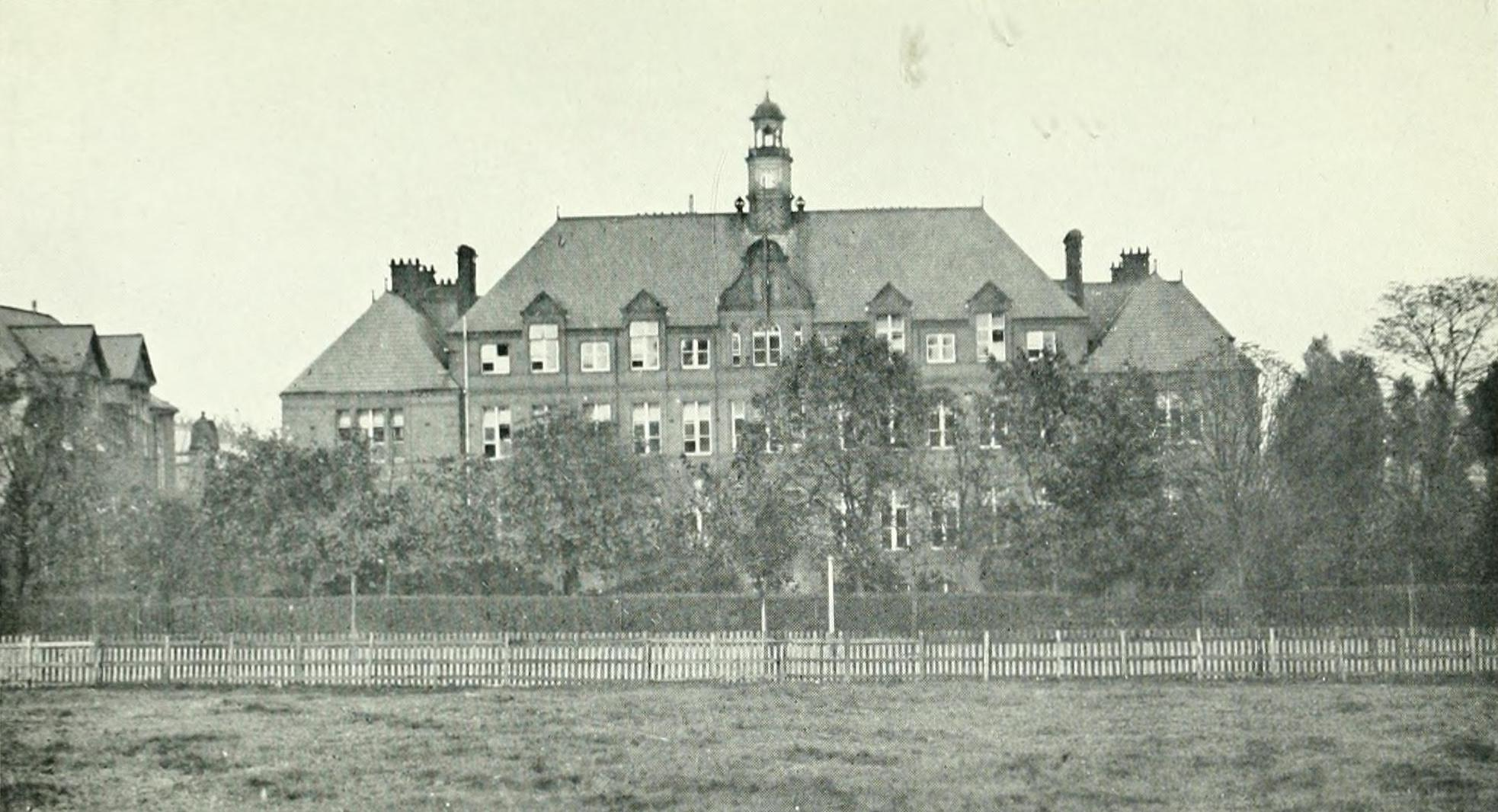
The main building in 1922

Alleyn's started developing a new theatre complex, named the Edward Alleyn Building, on 10 February 2007. The £8.5 million building was completed in 2008 and had a Grand Gala Opening in 2009.

== Extra-curricular activities ==
The school has one of the largest Combined Cadet Forces in the country, where students can choose between joining the Royal Navy Section, Army Section or RAF Section. The Alleyn's CCF is led mainly by its Cadet NCOs who are sixth form students who teach the younger cadets. These are led by a team of Senior Cadet NCOs under the Cadet RSM and members of the adult staff. The CCF is also linked to the Alleyn's School Rifle Club which competes in various cadet smallbore and fullbore target rifle competitions.

The Alleyn's CCF offers a JNCO CADRE, a leadership and infantry training programme, as well as visits to European battlefields, military bases in England and Wales, and recent courses in Northern Sweden and Cyprus. The Alleyn's CCF takes part in annual parades in Dulwich Village with the contingents of Dulwich College and JAGS on Remembrance Sunday. For Remembrance Sunday 2022, Alleyn's was invited to provide a party of cadets from the Army Section for the arrival of HM The King at the Cenotaph.

Music and drama also form a large part of life at Alleyn's with dramatic performances at the Michael Croft Theatre and musical performances at the Royal Festival Hall and St John's, Smith Square, in addition to musical tours to Italy, France and Poland.

== Heads of the school ==
- 1882–1902: The Rev. J. Henry Smith (head of the Lower School at Dulwich, 1875–1882)
- 1919–1940: R. B. Henderson
- 1945–1963: S. R. Hudson
- 1963–1966: Charles W. Lloyd
- 1967–1976: J. L. Fanner
- 1976–1990: D. A. Fenner
- 1992–2002: Dr Colin H. R. Niven
- 2002–2010: Dr Colin Diggory
- 2010–2020: Dr Gary Savage
- 2020: Mr Andy Skinnard (interim)
- 2021–present: Jane Lunnon

== Alleyn's Old Boys and Girls ==
School alumni are known as Alleyn Old Boys and Girls, or Alleyn's Old Boys and Girls. This should not be confused with Old Alleynians, the name of Dulwich College alumni.

- Stuart Blanch, Baron Blanch (1918–1994), Bishop of Liverpool, 1966–1975, Archbishop of York, 1975–1983
- Tom Brooke
- Nancy Carroll (born 1974), actress
- Jack Chalker (1918–2014), artist
- Eden Cheng
- Cyrus Chothia
- Jonathan Clark, bishop
- Donal Coonan
- Ray Cooney (born 1932), playwright and actor
- Sir Henry Cotton (1907–1987), golfer
- Francis Cubbon
- Theo Dan
- Peter Darling, choreographer
- Nicholas Day, actor
- Luc de Fougerolles
- Mike Edwards, cricketer
- Kenneth Farrington
- C. S. Forester (1899–1966), novelist
- Rich Fownes
- Pixie Geldof
- Julian Glover (born 1935), actor
- Victor Groom
- Harry Guntrip (1901–1975), psychotherapist and Congregational minister
- Eddie Hardin
- Chris Harper, RAF officer
- Michael Hastings, playwright
- David Hemmings
- Terence Higgins, Baron Higgins
- Douglas Higgs
- Sir Joe Hooper (1914–1994), director, Government Communications Headquarters, 1965–1973; Government Intelligence Co-ordinator, 1973–1978
- Sir Michael Houghton, 2020 Nobel Prize in Physiology or Medicine laureate and co-discoverer of Hepatitis C
- Leslie Howard (1893–1943), actor, 1907–1910
- Zezi Ifore
- R. V. Jones (1911–1997), physicist, military intelligence expert; Professor of Natural Philosophy, University of Aberdeen, 1946–1981
- Baron Ajay Kakkar (born 1964), Professor of Surgical Science, St Bartholomew's Hospital, London (Roper's House; also a school governor)
- Frederick Keeble
- John Lanchbery (1923–2003), Principal Conductor of the Royal Ballet, Principal Conductor of The Australian Ballet, and Musical Director of the American Ballet Theatre
- Jude Law (born 1972), actor
- Laurence Llewelyn-Bowen (born 1965), television presenter and architect
- Peter Stanley Lyons (1927–2006), Director of Music, Royal Naval College, Greenwich; Master of Choristers and Director of Music, Wells Cathedral and Wells Cathedral School; Headmaster, Witham Hall School
- Kelvin MacKenzie
- James Bolivar Manson (1879–1945), painter and director of Tate Gallery, 1930–1938
- Mitch McGugan, musician
- Caleb Azumah Nelson
- Louis Partridge
- Jack Peñate (born 1984), singer-songwriter (Spurgeon's House)
- Ben Preston
- John Pretlove
- Walter Pretty
- Sir V. S. Pritchett (1900–1997), writer and critic
- John Pullinger
- Tilly Ramsay
- Colin Robbins, software engineer
- Jacob Shaw (born 1988), cellist
- Robin Shroot
- Ed Simons of The Chemical Brothers
- Kenneth Spring (1921–1997), British Army officer and artist
- Mickey Stewart (born 1933), cricketer
- John Stride (1936–2018), actor
- Dobrinka Tabakova
- Frank Thornton
- Simon Ward (1941–2012), actor
- Hannah Ware (born 1982), model and actress, Boss
- Jessie Ware (born 1984), singer, journalist
- Arthur Watson (1880–1969), editor, The Daily Telegraph, 1924–1950
- Cullum Welch (1895–1980), businessman and Lord Mayor of London
- Florence Welch (born 1986), vocalist and songwriter of Florence and the Machine (Spurgeon's House)
- Samuel West (born 1966), actor
- David Weston, actor
- Felix White (born 1984), guitarist and vocalist of The Maccabees
- Philip Woodfield
- Sky Yang (born 1999), actor
- Sir Frank George Young (1908–1988), biochemist; first master of Darwin College, Cambridge, 1964–1976

== Gallery ==
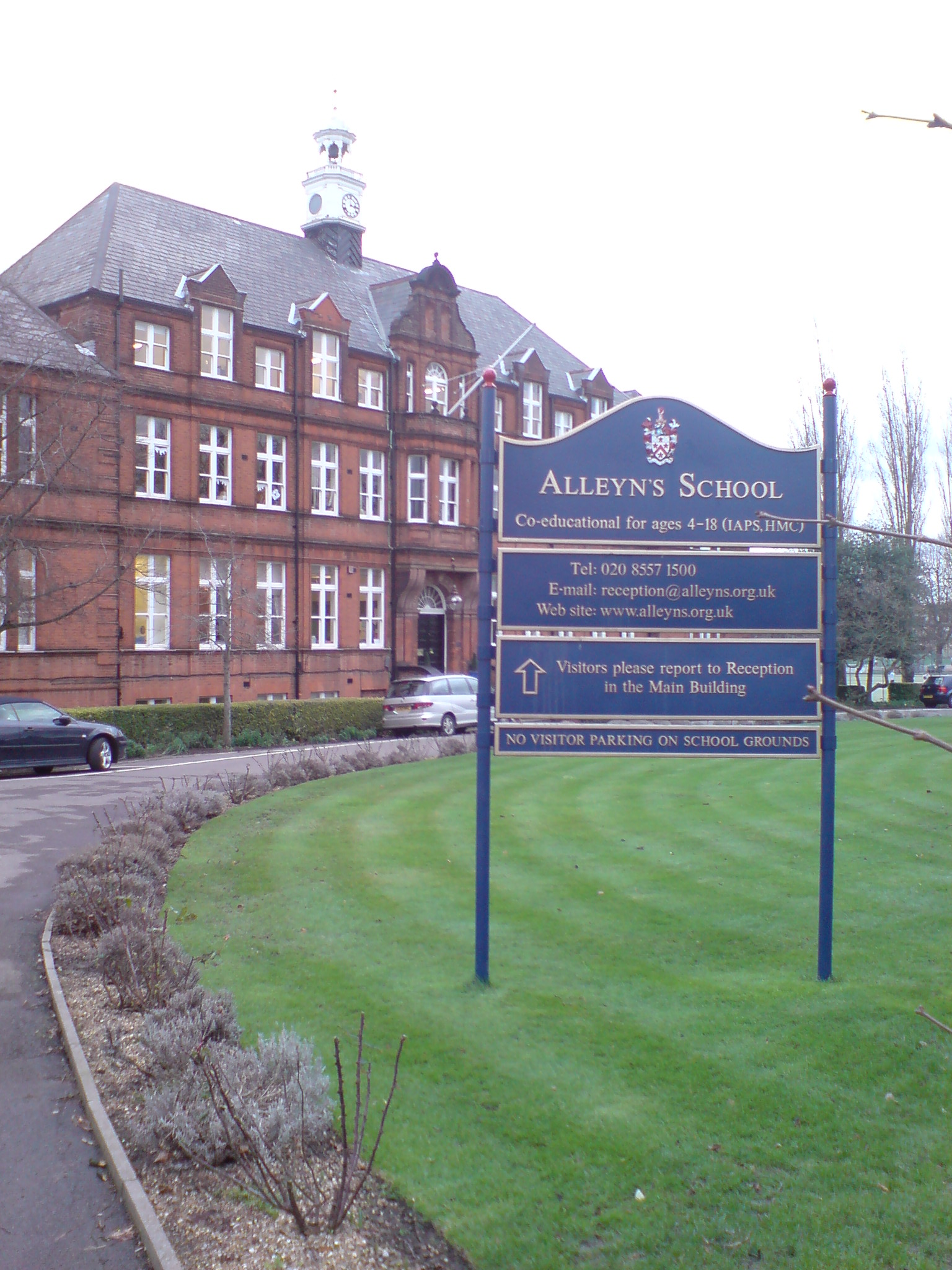
Main entrance

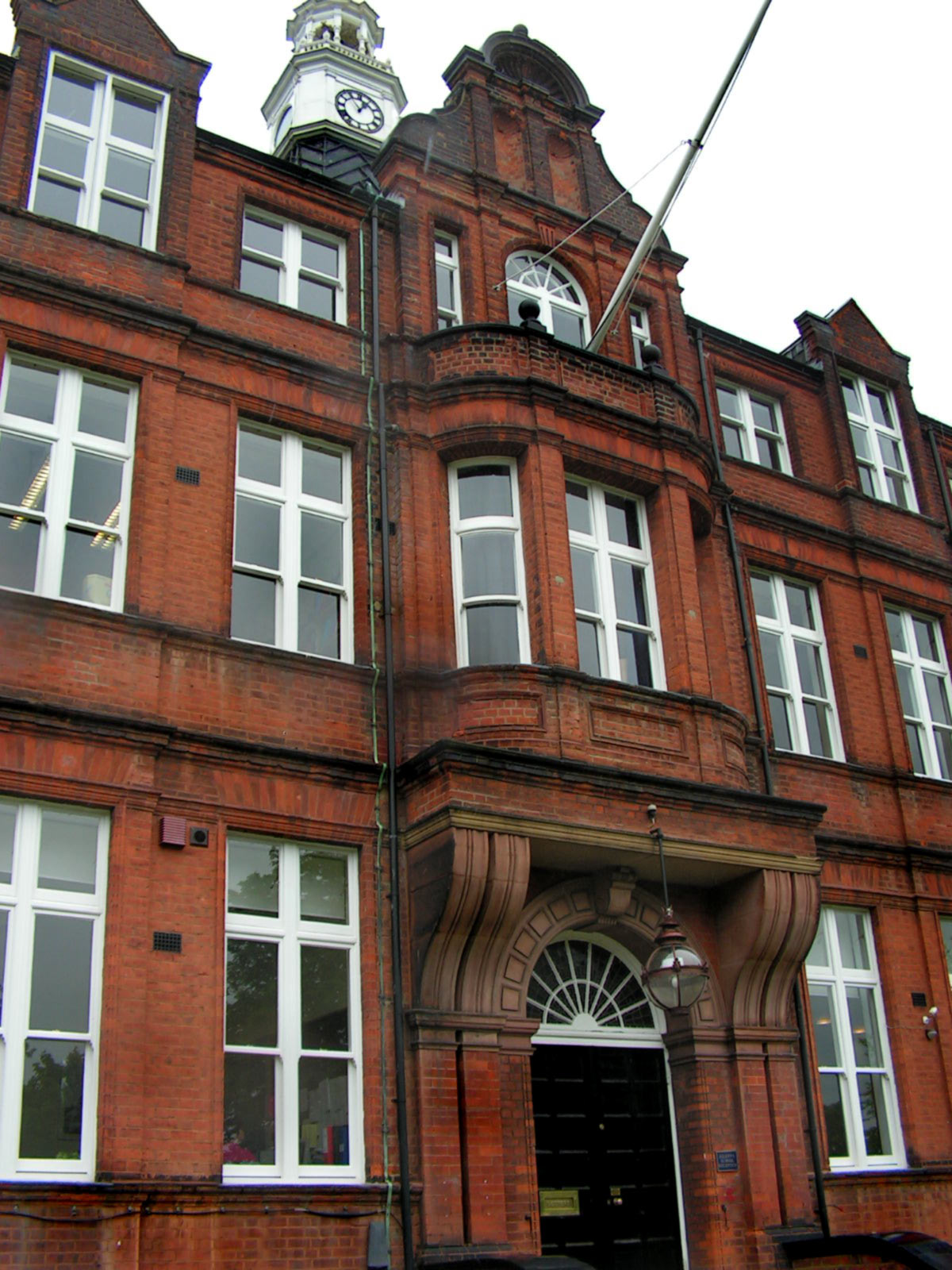
Front of the main building of Alleyn's School

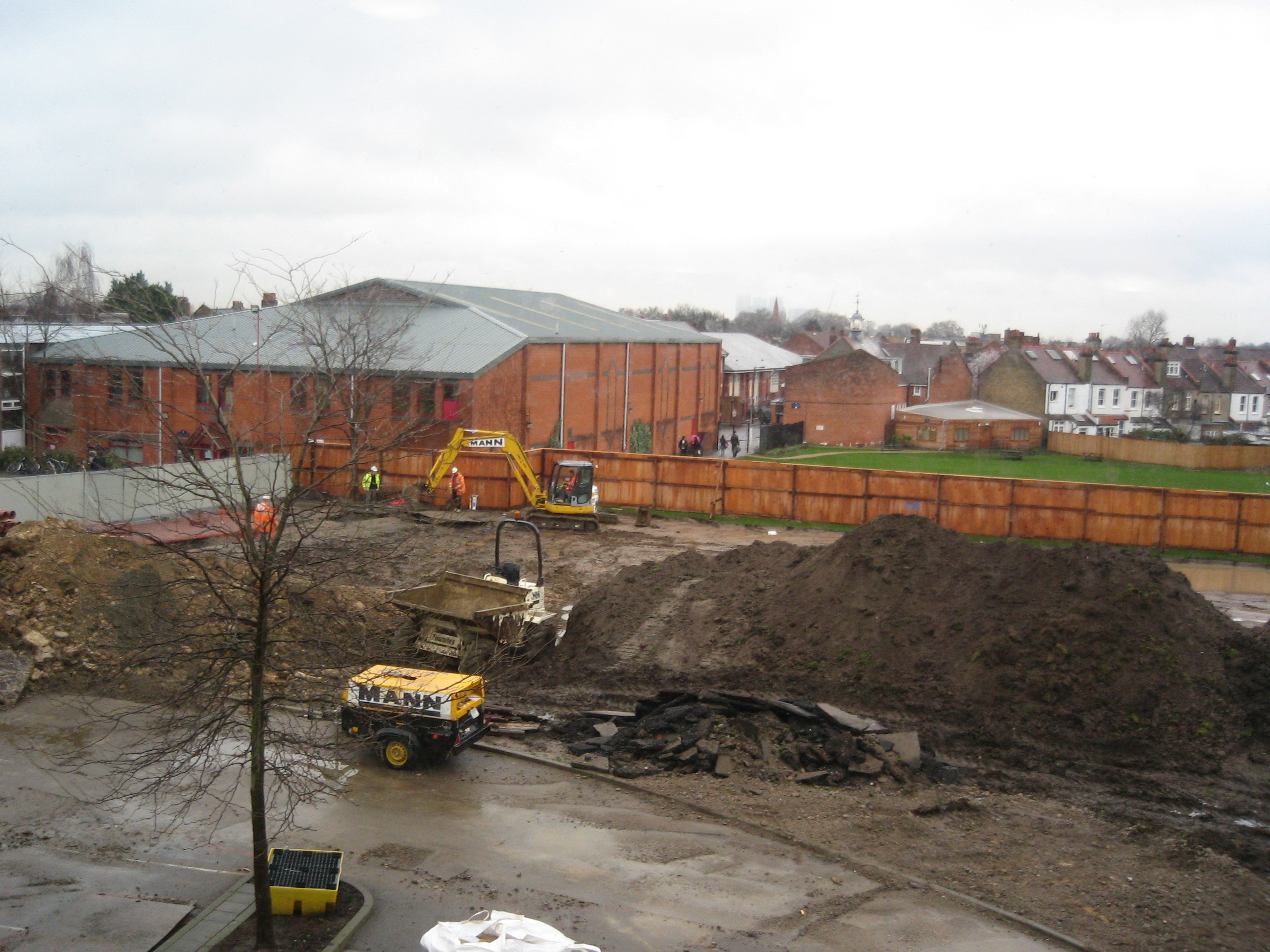
Building work commencing on the new Edward Alleyn Building

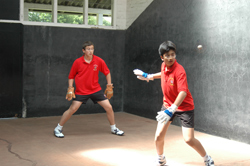
Two Alleyn's students playing Fives

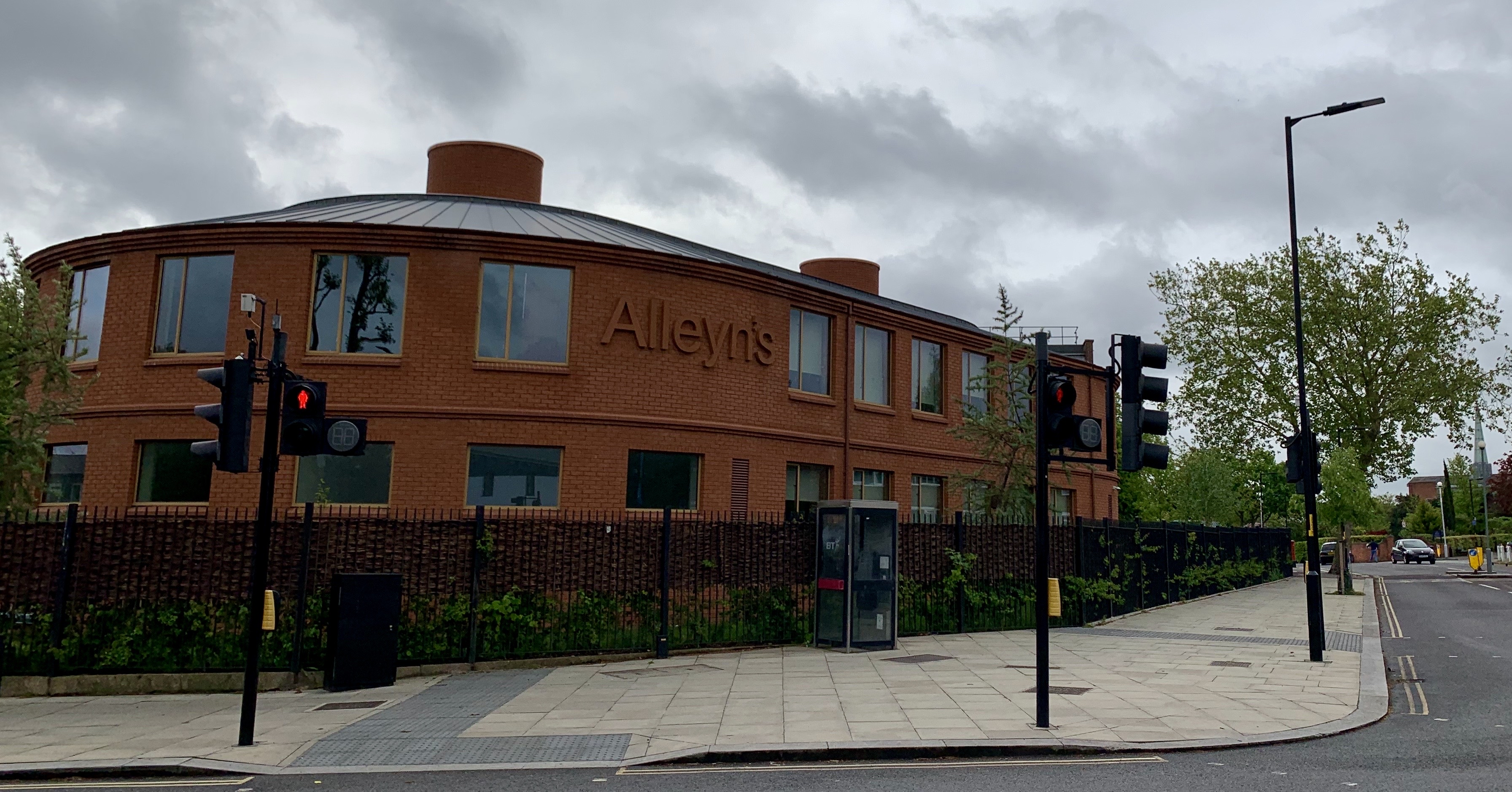
Lower School building

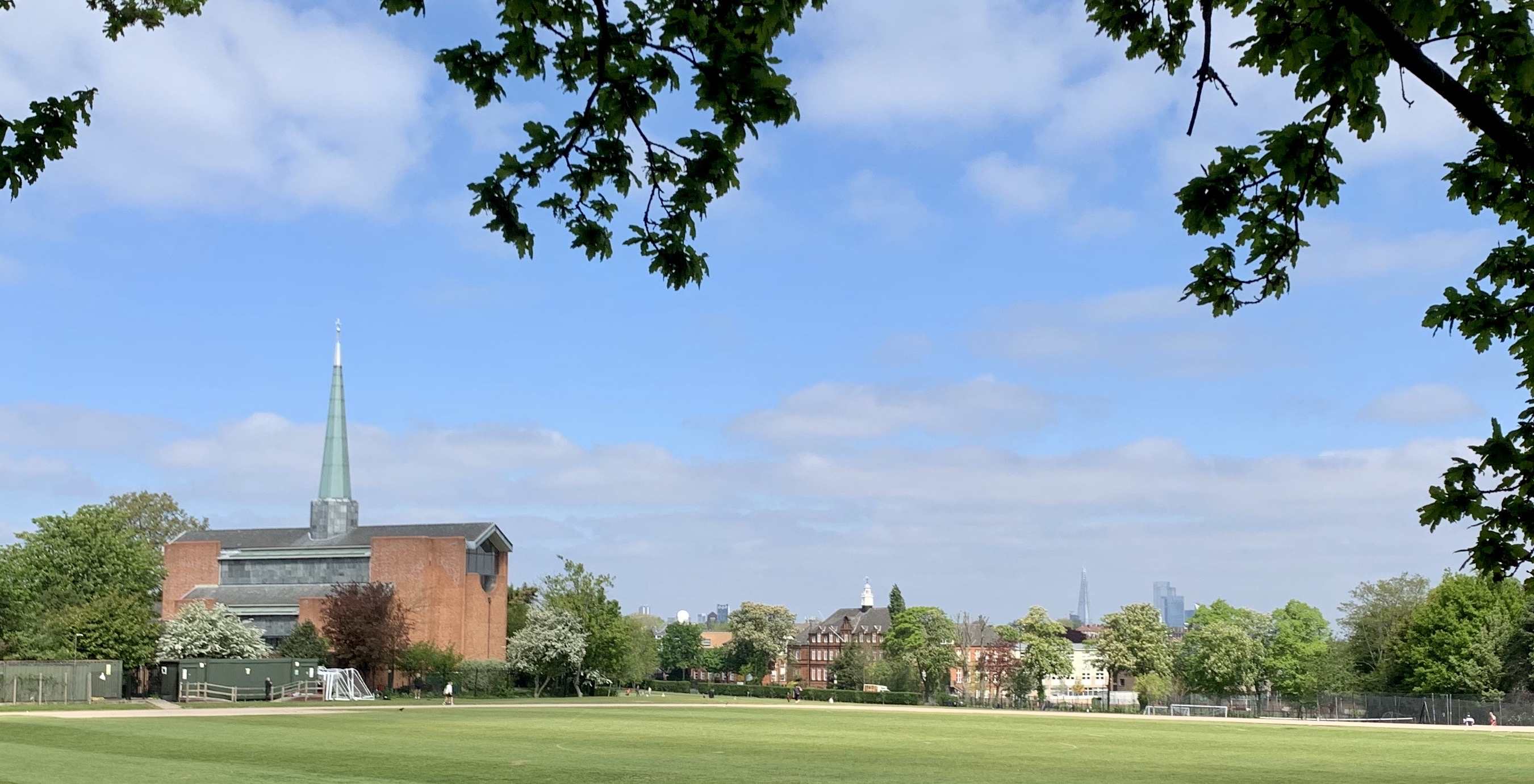
Alleyn's main building (right) and Saint Barnabas' Church (left)

== Bibliography ==
- Chandler, Arthur (October 1998), Alleyn's - the Co-educational School, Gresham Books Ltd, ISBN 9780946095339
- Donald P. Leinster-Mackay (1990), "Alleyn's and Rossall Schools: The Second World War, Experience and Status (Issue 18 of Educational administration and history monograph)", Educational Administration and History Monograph- University of Leeds, Museum of the History of Education, University of Leeds: 51 pages, ISSN 0140-0428
