= John Pretlove =

English sportsman (1932–2018)

- Pretlove in the 1950s

Personal information
- Full name: John Frederick Pretlove
- Born: 23 November 1932; Camberwell, London
- Died: 1 April 2018 (aged 85)
- Batting: Right-handed
- Bowling: Slow left-arm orthodox

Domestic team information
- Years: Team
- 1954–1956: Cambridge University
- 1955–1959: Kent

Career statistics
Competition	First-class
Matches	124
Runs scored	5,115
Batting average	26.78
100s/50s	10/26
Top score	137
Balls bowled	3,023
Wickets	43
Bowling average	30.67
5 wickets in innings	1
10 wickets in match	0
Best bowling	5/55
Catches/stumpings	70/2
- Source: Cricinfo, 1 June 2014

John Frederick Pretlove (23 November 1932 – 1 April 2018) was an English amateur sportsman whose first-class cricket career extended from 1954 to 1968 and who was considered one of the best Rugby fives players in England. He played cricket for Cambridge University and Kent County Cricket Club between 1955 and 1959 and for MCC until 1968.

== Early life ==
Pretlove was born at Camberwell in London, the eldest son of a shopkeeper, and educated at Alleyn's School before going up to Gonville and Caius College, Cambridge in 1953 to read English and Russian – having completed his national service in the Intelligence Corps after leaving school. At school he had won the Public Schools Rugby fives singles competition in 1950 and both the singles and doubles in 1951 and had played both cricket and football. At university he won Blues for cricket, association football and Rugby fives, captaining the football team.

== Sporting life ==
Pretlove made his first-class cricket debut for Cambridge against Warwickshire at Fenner's in April 1954 and played in the first of his three University matches later in the same season. He played for Surrey's Second XI in 1954 before moving to play for Kent in 1955 during the university vacation. He played for Kent until 1959 and played his final first-class match for MCC in 1968.

Pretlove was considered one of the best Rugby Fives players in the country between 1955 and 1965 and was considered a gifted athlete with "balance and timing". He won the Jester's Club Cup, the national singles title, four times between 1953 and 1958 and was runner-up three times between 1960 and 1963. With Dennis Silk he won the national doubles competition each year between 1956 and 1959 and won the competition with different partners on three other occasions between 1952 and 1968. He played football for Corinthian-Casuals and coached Rugby Fives at Alleyn's School, where the main Fives courts were renamed in his honour in 2002. He was also a school governor at Alleyn's between 1998 and 2009 and President of the Old Boys Association.

== Later life ==
Pretlove worked as a marketing and public relations consultant in the construction industry. He was President of the Rugby Fives Association between 1985 and 1987 and its General Secretary in the 1990s and was President of Kent Cricket in 1999. He died at Easter 2018 having suffered from Alzheimer's disease for more than ten years.
