= Jean Orr-Ewing =

English pathologist and a bacteriologist (1897–1944)

Jean Orr-Ewing (28 April 1897 – 17 November 1944) was a pathologist and a bacteriologist who was part of the small team of scientists who first isolated and purified penicillin for the treatment of bacterial infection.

== Biography ==
Orr-Ewing, the daughter of John Orr-Ewing and his first wife Ellen Clarissa (née Kennard), was born on 28 April 1897. Her paternal grandfather was Sir Archibald Orr-Ewing, 1st Baronet and her maternal grandfather, Howard John Kennard, was co-founder of the London Stereoscopic and Photographic Company.

She went to Boston House School in Eastbourne and later, from 1916 to 1920, she was a student at Lady Margaret Hall, Oxford. She passed her exam in pathology in December 1920 and was awarded a BA degree in June 1921, the year after women were first admitted to degrees at Oxford. She continued her medical training with clinical work at St Mary's Hospital, London, taking the Conjoint Diploma in 1923, and being awarded a Bachelor of Medicine in 1924. It was St Mary's Hospital, London where Alexander Fleming first discovered penicillin in 1928 (but was not able to isolate the main compound so it could be properly purified for production in large amounts).

She then worked at the Sir William Dunn School of Pathology, of Oxford University and was awarded a Schorstein Research Fellowship in Medical Science for two years. At that time she was elected to a research fellowship at Lady Margaret Hall. From 1932 to 1939 she held a tutorship in the Oxford Society of Home Students and was also elected as a tutorial fellow at Lady Margaret Hall from 1938. She was the first dedicated science tutorial fellow at the college, and "At the outbreak of the second war she was one of only two tutorial fellows in science in the five women's colleges".

She died on 17 November 1944.

== Science ==
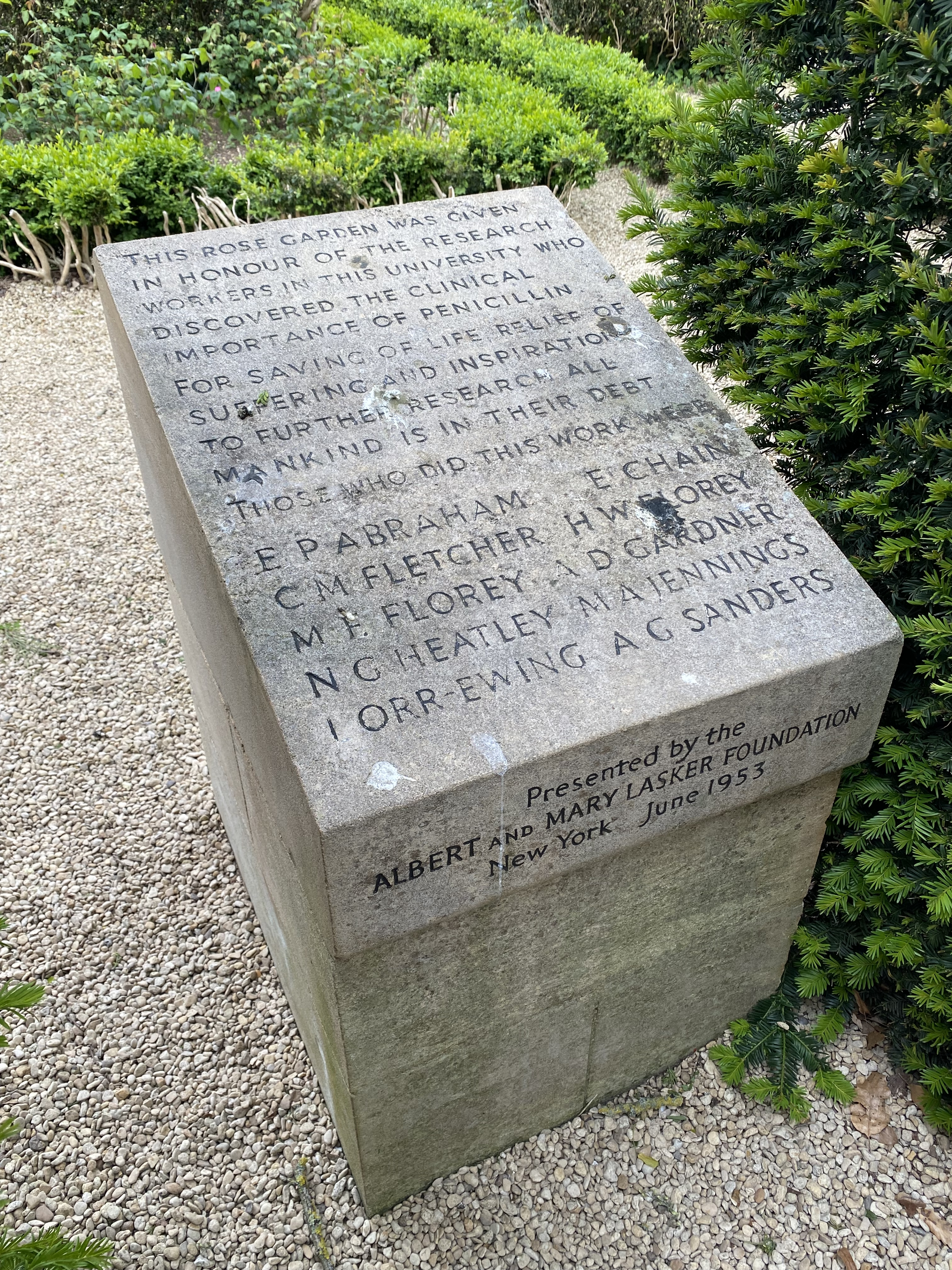
Memorial plinth commemorating scientists who worked on the medical applications of penicillin in the Rose Garden, at the Oxford Botanic Gardens.

When Orr-Ewing started her research at the Sir William Dunn School of Pathology Georges Dreyer was the professor of pathology. She worked with and co-authored publications with both Dreyer and Professor Peters of the Oxford Department of Biochemistry.

After Dreyer's retirement Howard Florey became the director in 1935. Orr-Ewing and A. D. Gardner were the only scientists from Dryer's team who continued after Florey took over as Dreyer's successor. They both worked with Florey and Chain on the isolation and purification of penicillin, work for which Florey and Chain became Nobel Prize winners. Orr-Ewing's and Gardner's roles involved investigating how newly isolated penicillin reacted with other organisms, and "making a thorough study of the principal pathogenic bacteria and their sensitivity to penicllin". "It was they who, on observing the growth of the sensitive bacteria in the presence of penicillin, came to the conclusion that it did not act like an antiseptic or an enzyme, but rather, as a blocker of the normal process of cell division". Orr-Ewing was co-author on the team's first key publication on the use of penicillin for the treatment of bacterial infection.

Orr-Ewing is one of the ten names inscribed on the memorial plinth commemorating the scientists who worked on the medical applications of penicillin, which was erected in 1953 in the Rose Garden outside the entrance to the University of Oxford Botanic Garden.

A diphtherial infection which she accidentally sustained whilst working on diphtheria bacilli, left her with a slight permanent weakness of the heart.

== Mountaineering ==
Orr-Ewing was "a great climber of Swiss mountains and Lakeland rocks". She was instrumental in founding the Oxford University Women's Mountaineering Club in the early 1920s and she was the organising leader of the Oxford University Women's Iceland Expedition in 1934.

She later joined the Pinnacle Club and continued climbing into the 1930s, in Corsica and in Switzerland. She was elected as a fellow of the Royal Geographical Society in 1938.
