= Donal Coonan =

British actor, writer and presenter

Donal Coonan is an actor, writer and presenter, who is most notable for presenting Channel 4's web show thisisaknife.

== Early life ==
Coonan was born 15 December 1981 in London. He attended Alleyn's School in Dulwich, South London, before reading Philosophy, Politics and Economics at Lady Margaret Hall, Oxford.

While at Oxford, Coonan performed in both the Oxford Revue and Not the Oxford Revue and took part in the 2004 OUDS tour of Julius Caesar to Japan. He also co-presented The Fireman Sam and Coonan the Barbarian Show on the student radio station Altered Radio, and won the 2003 Oxford Film Cuppers competition with the short film 'Free Lunch Odyssey'.

From 2007 to 2008, Coonan attended Philippe Gaulier's L'École Philippe Gaulier in Paris.

== Presenting ==
In December 2005, Coonan became one of four presenters of Channel 4's web show thisisaknife, and when the show went weekly in May 2006, he became the sole presenter of the show. He continued in this role until thisisaknife ended in September 2007.

In 2008, Coonan presented pods on Current TV such as Am I An Alcoholic? and This Will Help You Pull, and, as of June 2009, is currently taking part, along with Fraser Byrne, in Current TV's Blag a Million project.

== Other projects ==
=== Taboo advert ===
In December 2006, Coonan starred in an advert for the board game Taboo as part of Taboo's Europe-wide relaunch. He played a man in a sauna.

=== Learn to Play the Ukulele in Under an Hour (How George Formby Saved My Life) ===
Coonan starred as Beryl Formby in the show Learn to Play the Ukulele in Under an Hour (How George Formby Saved My Life) at the Gilded Balloon as part of the Edinburgh Festival Fringe in August 2008. Chortle described it as 'a straight-down-the-line, gentle, sweet, completely enchanting show, tinged with melancholy'.

=== A Moment Twice ===
In November 2008, Coonan won a short film competition organised to mark the release of Jonas Cuaron's debut feature film Año Uña with his entry A Moment Twice. It concerns a trip to Robin Hood's Bay on the North Yorkshire coast he and his family took when he was a child and his nostalgic feelings about this event upon finding an old roll of cine film and some photographs taken on the trip. Like Año Uña, it consists entirely of still photographs.

=== Funny or Die ===
In December 2009, Coonan wrote and appeared in the sketch Meat Feast with adult performer Alexis Silver for Funny or Die.

=== Dave ===
Coonan is currently one of three finalists in a competition run by Dave. If he wins this contest, Coonan will be awarded a cash prize of £10,000 and will become the "roving reporter of Dave online". Vote Donal on Dave TV

The competition finished on 10 May 2010. Which Donal won. His blog for the channel is http://uktv.co.uk/dave/blog/sid/8279

== See also ==
- thisisaknife
