= Three Piece Reclining Figure No. 1 =

Sculpture by Henry Moore

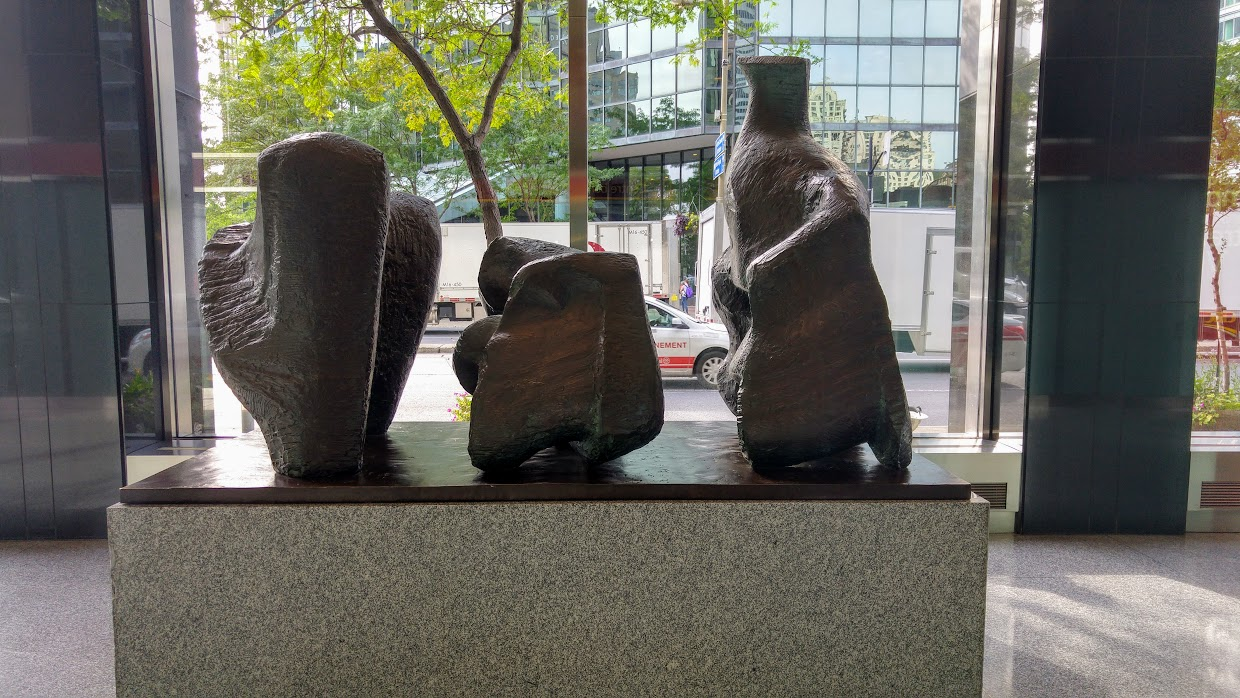
Three Piece Reclining Figure No. 1 (cast 1) at the Montreal Museum of Fine Arts

Three Piece Reclining Figure No. 1 (LH 500) is a bronze sculpture by Henry Moore, dated to 1961-62. Eight casts were made at the Hermann Noack foundry in Berlin (seven plus an artist's copy) around 1962.

The sculpture can be analysed as an abstracted female form divided into three components: at one end, the tallest element is a head and torso, then the abdomen, and finally the legs. Around the same time, Moore was working on a similar three part figure, which became his Three Piece Reclining Figure No. 2: Bridge Prop, 1963. Both are thought to have been based on maquettes formed from arrangements of found bones and pebbles, modified with clay or plaster. One of the working models, Three Piece Reclining Figure: Maquette No.1 (LH 499) was made in 1961, with a plaster version held by the Henry Moore Foundation, and bronzes cast in London around 1961-63 in an edition of nine (eight plus an artist's copy).

The final sculpture is based on a full-size plaster model, also made in 1961-62, which has been held since 1974 by the Art Gallery of Ontario. The plaster model was sent to the Noack foundry for casting, likely using the lost wax process.

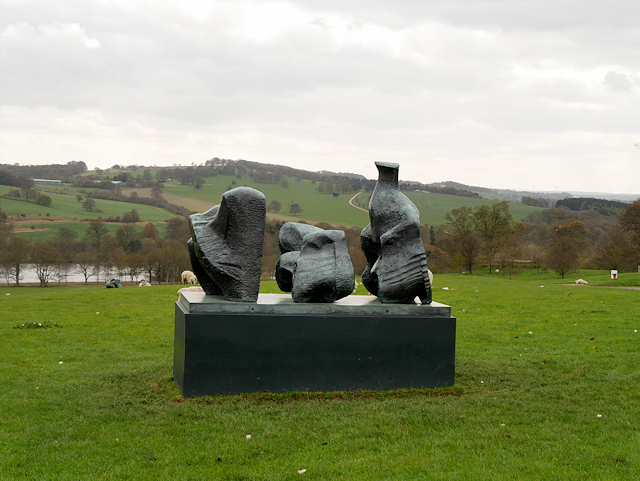
Three Piece Reclining Figure No. 1 (cast 0) at the Yorkshire Sculpture Park

Many of the bronze casts are held in public collections.

- Moore presented the artist's copy (cast 0) to the Tate Gallery in 1978. It was on long-term loan to Leeds City Art Gallery from 1979 to 1987, and at the Yorkshire Sculpture Park since 1988.
- Cast 1 was unveiled in 1962 in the atrium of the CIBC Tower by mayor Jean Drapeau, the artist's first monumental sculpture to be unveiled in Canada. The CIBC donated it to its present home in the Montreal Museum of Fine Arts in 2017 and it is now exhibited in its sculpture garden.
- Four casts are held by public collections in the USA:
  - cast 2 at the Rochester Institute of Technology
  - cast 3 at the Meadows Museum at the Southern Methodist University in Dallas
  - cast 4 at the Los Angeles County Museum of Art
  - cast 7 at the Baltimore Museum of Art.

Cast 5 and cast 6 are held in private collections.

== See also ==
- List of sculptures by Henry Moore
