= Reclining Figure =

Reclining Figure may refer to:

- Reclining Figure (Dennis), a sculpture by Michael Dennis, in Vancouver's Guelph Park
- Reclining Figure (Lincoln Center), a statue by Henry Moore
- Reclining Figure 1938, a sculpture by Henry Moore
- Reclining Figure 1939, a sculpture by Henry Moore
- Reclining Figure 1956, a sculpture by Henry Moore
- Reclining Figure 1969–70, a sculpture by Henry Moore
- Reclining Figure: Arch Leg, a sculpture by Henry Moore
- Reclining Figure: External Form 1953–1954, a sculpture by Henry Moore
- Reclining Figure: Festival, a sculpture by Henry Moore
