= Three Way Piece No.1: Points =

Sculpture series by Henry Moore

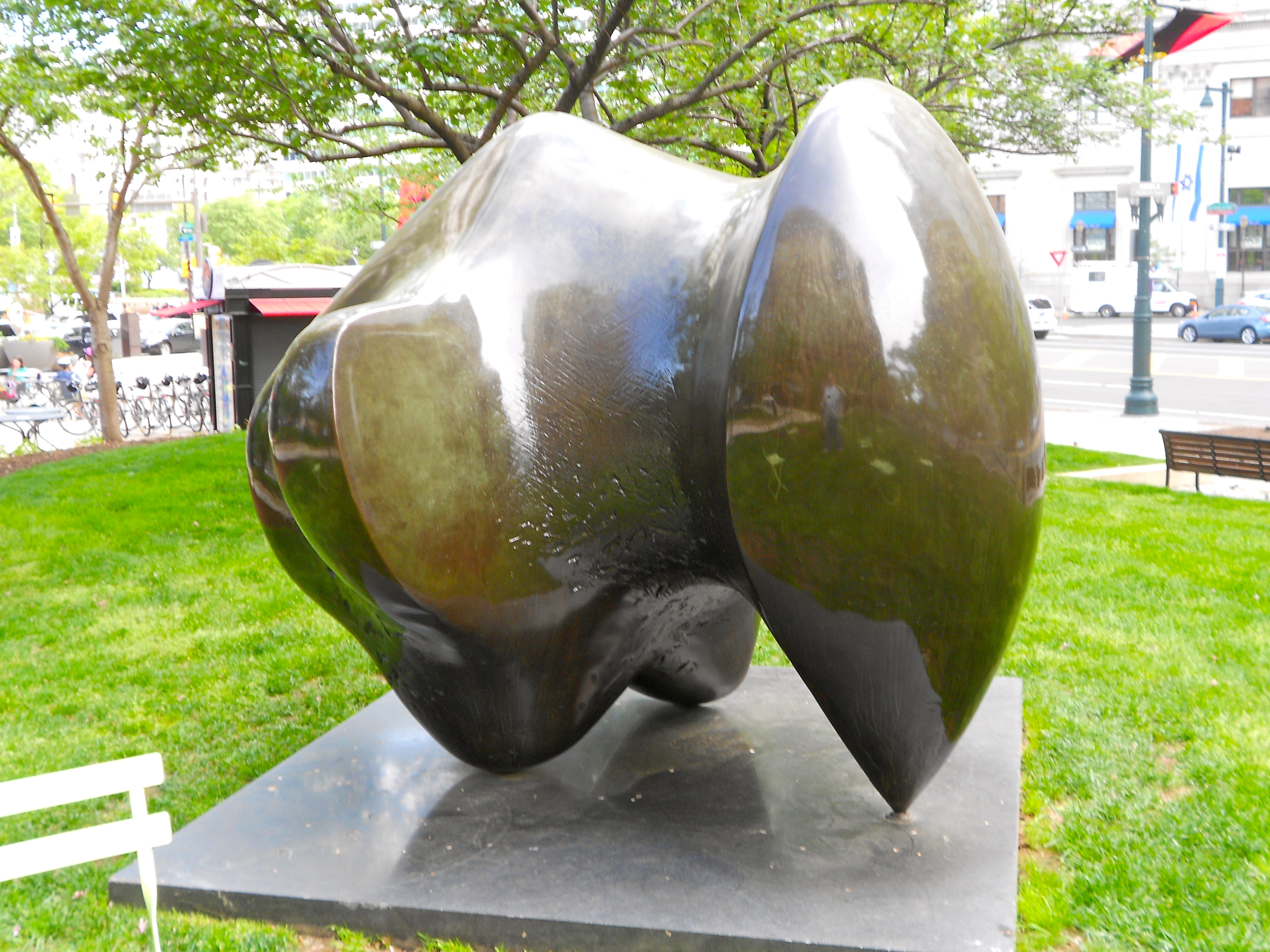
- Franklin Parkway near Logan Square, Philadelphia
- Artist: Henry Moore
- Year: 1967
- Catalogue: LH 533
- Medium: bronze
- Dimensions: 192 cm (76 in)

Three-Way Piece No.1: Points (LH 533) is a bronze abstract sculpture by Henry Moore. Three full-size sculptures were cast in 1967, one installed on the Columbia University campus in Upper Manhattan, New York City, and the others at Des Moines Art Center, and Fairmount Park in Philadelphia.

Casts of a related bronze sculpture, Three Way Piece No.2: Archer, are displayed at Nathan Phillips Square outside Toronto City Hall, Canada, and in the National Gallery, Berlin, Germany.

== Description ==
The sculpture is based on a piece of flint with three prongs. Moore intended to create a sculpture that could be placed in a variety of different orientations, and which would still work when viewed from different angles. The title refers to the points of the flint, and the intention that the sculpture would be effective in three orientations.

Moore first created a plaster maquette (LH 531) in 1964. Moore scaled the maquette up into a larger plaster version, now held by the Art Gallery of Ontario but damaged beyond repair in 1974, which was cast as a 30 inches (760 mm) bronze working model (LH 532) in an edition of seven (plus one artists model) in 1964. One example is held by the Tate Gallery in London, England. This model was scaled up to the full-size sculpture (LH 533), cast in an edition of three. The full-size bronze was too large and heavy to be moved into different positions by one person.

The full-size bronze sculpture is approximately 6 feet (1.8 m) tall and has a diameter of 7 feet 8 inches (2.34 m). The three casts are displayed at Fairmount Park in Philadelphia,(39°57′19.9″N 75°10′0.5″W) and at Columbia University, (40°48′27.0″N 73°57′37.8″W) with the third at Des Moines Art Center since 1998. (41°35′3.9″N 93°40′53.6″W)

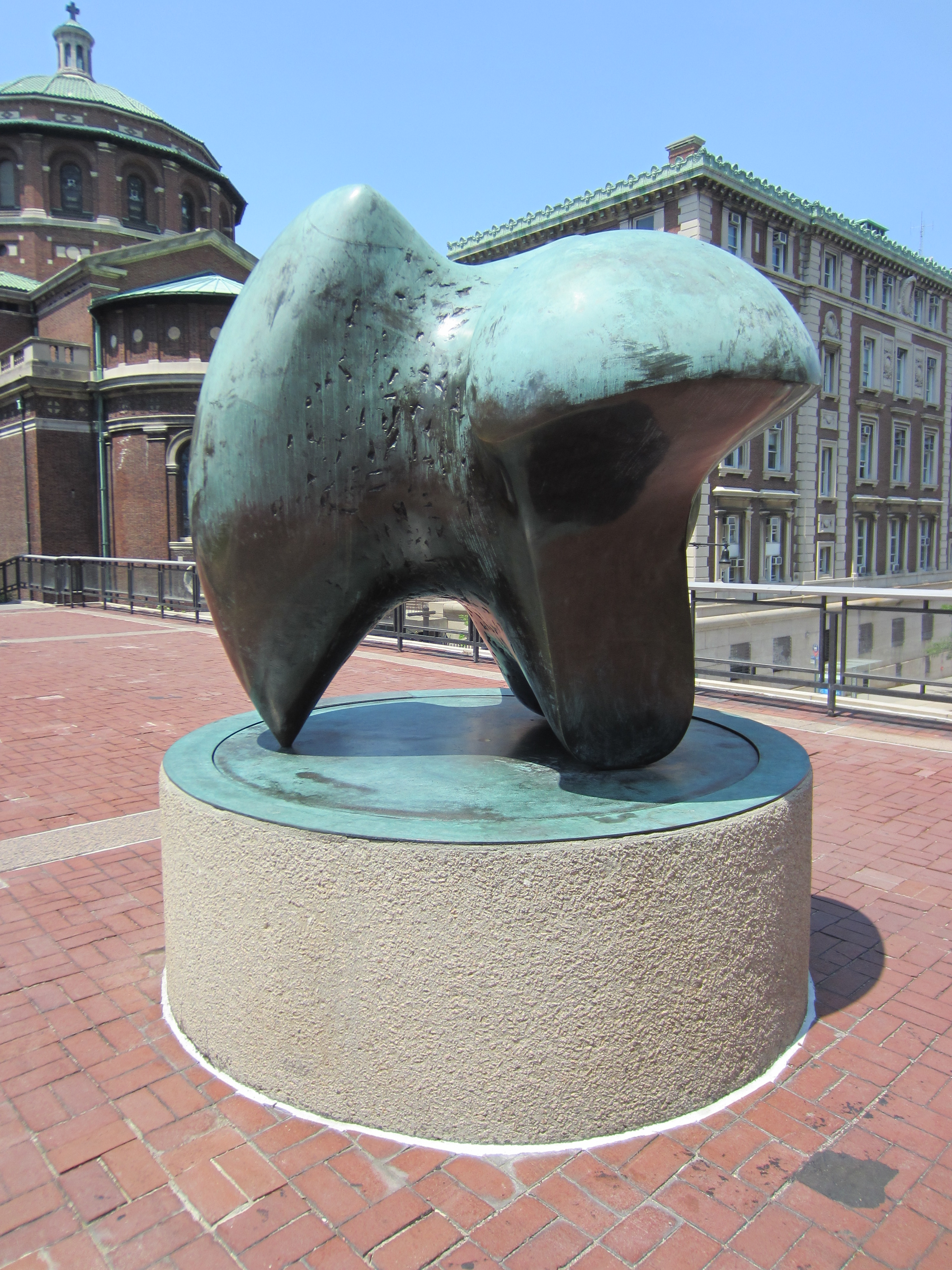
Columbia

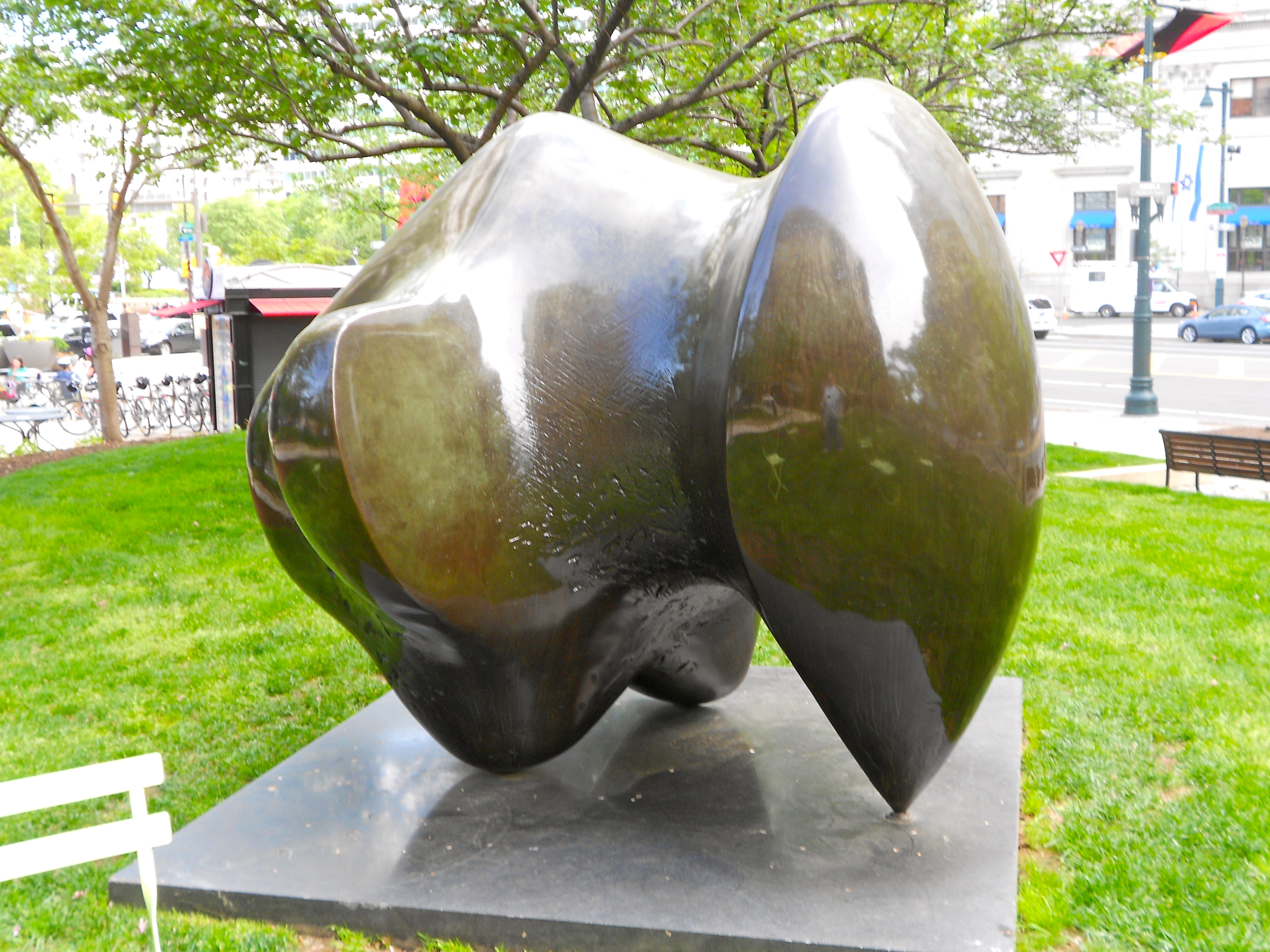
Philadelphia

Moore used a similar process to create a second three-way sculpture, known as Three Way Piece No.2: Archer, with a similar edition of seven plus one working models (LH 534) and two full-size casts (LH 535): one installed at Nathan Phillips Square outside Toronto City Hall, (43°39′10.2″N 79°23′2.5″W) and the other in the National Gallery, Berlin. (52°30′26.1″N 13°22′6.0″E)

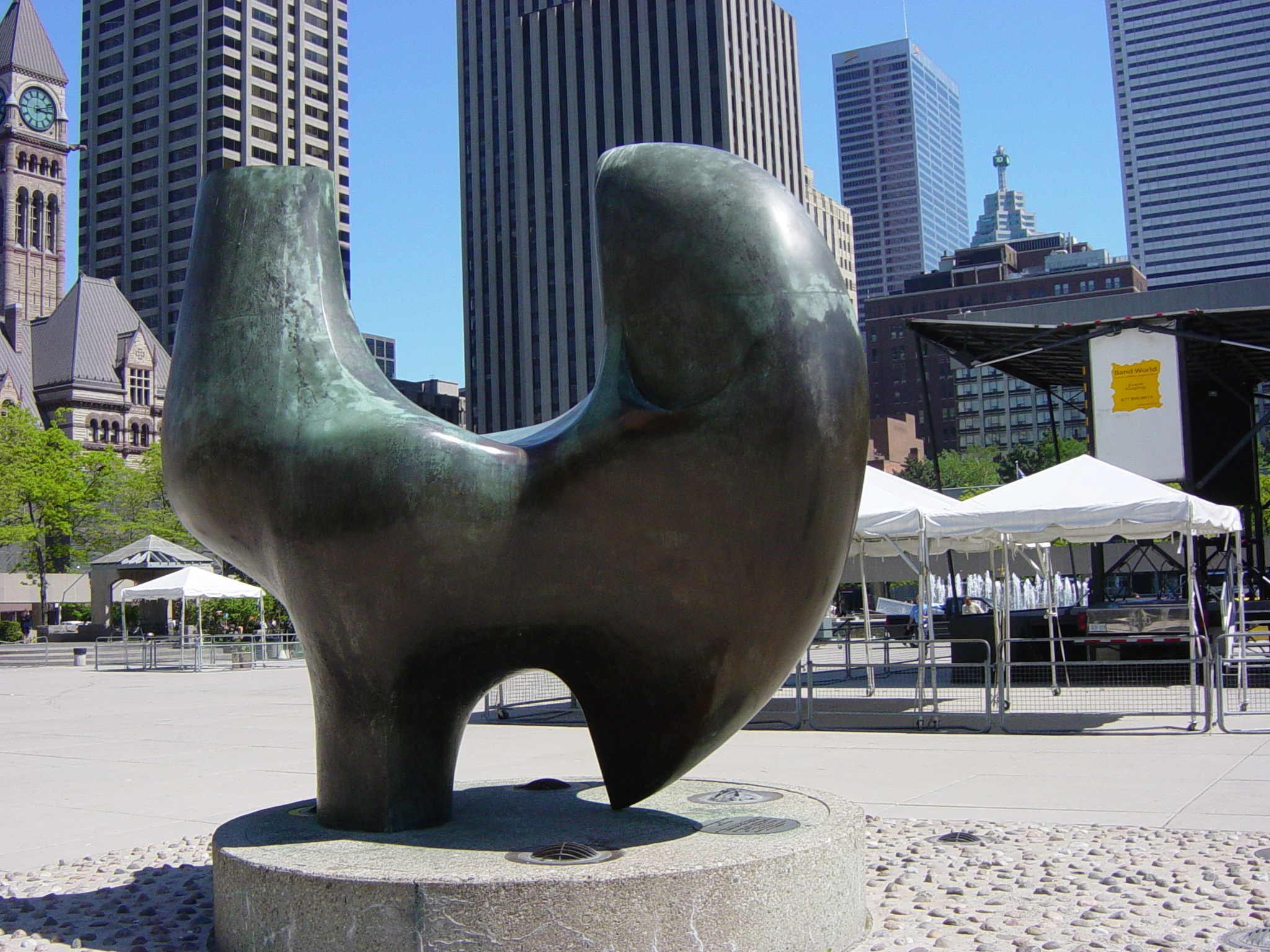
Toronto

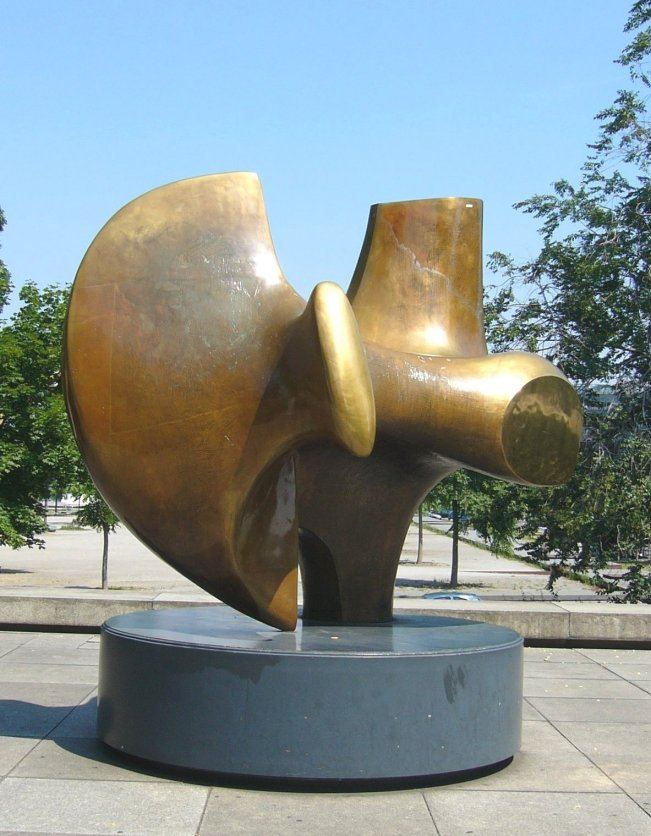
Berlin

== Columbia cast ==
The example at Columbia University has a granite base which measures approximately 2 feet, 8 inches and has a diameter of 7 feet, 7 inches. It was dedicated on October 3, 1973. It was surveyed and deemed "treatment needed" by Smithsonian Institution's "Save Outdoor Sculpture!" program in February 1993.

== See also ==
- List of sculptures by Henry Moore
