= Large Torso, Arch =

Sculpture by Henry Moore

Large Torso Arch
- Artist: Henry Moore
- Year: 1962-63
- Catalogue: LH 503
- Type: bronze
- Dimensions: 199 cm × 144 cm × 130 cm (78.5 in × 56.5 in × 51 in)
- Location: Lynden Sculpture Garden; Milwaukee, Wisconsin; 43°10′35.3″N 87°56′12.4″W
- Owner: Bradley Family Foundation

Large Torso Arch (LH 503) is a public art work by English artist Henry Moore located at the Lynden Sculpture Garden near Milwaukee, Wisconsin.

== Description ==
The bronze sculpture is an abstract, organic bone-like archway; it is installed on the lawn.

== See also ==
- List of sculptures by Henry Moore
- The Arch 1979–1980
