= List of sculptures by Henry Moore =

Henry Moore (30 July 1898 – 31 August 1986) was an English artist, best known for his semi-abstract carved sculptures in both wood and marble and for his monumental bronzes. These works often depicted abstractions of the human figure, with mother-and-child pairings, family groups and reclining figures being among the recurrent themes in his career along with sculptures based on interlocking structures and combinations of internal and external forms. As well as Moore's public commissions and works in museums, this list includes works in private collections that have been shown in exhibitions of his work.

The LH number, in the Designation column, refers to the number assigned to the work in the six-volume catalogue raisonné of sculptures by Moore published by Lund Humphries between 1944 and 2003. This list follows the conventions used in that publication;- versions of a work in different materials are assigned the same LH number while the entry in the Date column refers to the first identified work in a particular series.

Where an Edition of ... quantity is stated, this number will include the Artist's Copy, also known as the Reserved Copy or cast 0.

Dimensions are given in the order height by width by depth unless stated otherwise.

== 1920 to 1924 ==
Image	Title / subject	Location and coordinates	Date	Type	Material	Dimensions	Designation	Wikidata	Notes
	Small Animal Head	Henry Moore Foundation	1921		Boxwood	11.4 cm high	LH 1a		
	Dog	The Henry Moore Foundation	1922		Marble	17.8 x 13.7 x 10.0 cm	LH 2		
	Head of a Girl	Manchester Art Gallery	1922		Wood	23.5 x 7.5 x 10.0 cm	LH 4		
	Standing Woman	Manchester Art Gallery	1923		Walnut wood	39.0 x 11.7 x 10.0 cm	LH 5		
	Head of the Virgin	The Henry Moore Foundation	1922		Marble relief	31.0 x 19.0 x 53.3 cm	LH 6		
	Figure	Private collection	1923		Green marble	39.4 cm high	LH 8		
	Two Heads: Mother and Child	Private collection	1923		Serpentinite	11.0 x 18.0 x 11.5 cm	LH 13		
	Head of a Girl	The Henry Moore Foundation	1923		Clay	17.5 cm high	LH 15		
	Seated Figure	The Henry Moore Foundation	1924		Hopton Wood Stone	25.4 cm high	LH 19		
	Snake	Private collection	1924		Marble	17.1 cm high	LH 20		
	Mask	Private collection	1924		Green marble	17.8 cm high	LH 21		

== 1925 to 1929 ==
Image	Title / subject	Location and coordinates	Date	Type	Material	Dimensions	Designation	Wikidata	Notes
	Maternity	Leeds Art Gallery	1925		Hopton Wood Stone	220.4 x 14.0 x 15.0 cm	LH 22		
	Woman with Upraised Arms	Henry Moore Foundation	1925		Hopton Wood Stone	48.2 x 21.0 x 15.7 cm	LH 23		
	Two Heads	The Henry Moore Foundation	1925		Mansfield stone	33.3 x 26.5 x 23.0 cm	LH 25		
More images	Mother and Child	Manchester Art Gallery	1925		Hornton stone	57.0 cm high	LH 26		
	Standing Woman	N/A	1926		Stone	86.3 cm high	LH 33		Destroyed
	Head of a Woman	The Hepworth Wakefield	1926		Concrete	22.0 x 27.0 x 17.1 cm	LH 36		
	Six Garden Reliefs	Unknown	1926		Portland stone	87.6 cm high	LH 36a		
	Bird	University of Michigan Museum of Art, Private collection	1927		Bronze edition of two	19.0 x 22.6 x 13.3 cm	LH 39		
	Suckling Child	Unknown	1927		Concrete	43.2 cm high	LH 42		
	Reclining Woman	Private collection	1927		Cast concrete	63.5 cm long	LH 43		
	Mask	The Henry Moore Foundation	1927		Green stone	21.8 x 11.5 x 14.3 cm	LH 46		
	Head and Shoulders	Unknown	1927		Green marble	45.7 cm high	LH 48		
	Chairback Relief	Private collection	1928		Teak	78.7 cm high	LH 50a		
	Double Head	Bronze - The Henry Moore Foundation	1928		Stone, Bronze edition of seven cast c.1949	7.7 x 5.8 x 3.0 cm	LH 53		Stone carving destroyed
More images	Mask	Tate Britain	1928		Green gneiss	21.2 x 19.0 x 8.7 cm	LH 54		
More images	West Wind	St James's Park tube station, London	1929		Portland stone	243.8 cm long	LH 58	Q19759569	
	Reclining Figure	Leeds Art Gallery	1929		Brown Hornton stone	54.0 x 82.0 x 37.0 cm	LH 59		
	Figure with Clasped Hands	Tel Aviv Museum	1929		Travertine	51.0 x 34.0 x 16.0 cm	LH 60		
	Mask	The Henry Moore Foundation	1929		Stone	14.0 x 18.0 x 12.5 cm	LH 61		
	Mask	Leeds Art Gallery	1929		Concrete	24.0 x 21.0 x 12.3 cm	LH 62		
More images	Mask	Tate Britain	1929		Concrete	20.0 cm high	LH 63		
	Mask	Tate Britain	1929		Concrete	20.0 cm high	LH 64		
	Seated Figure	The Henry Moore Foundation	1929		Cast concrete	44.5 x 17.0 x 23.4 cm	LH 65		
	Half-Figure	British Council, Private collection	1929		Concrete - two casts	42.0 x 27.0 x 19.5 cm	LH 67		
	Reclining Figure	Unknown	1929		Alabaster	47.7 cm high	LH 71		
	Mask	Private collection	1929		Lead	21.6 cm high	LH 72		
	Head	Unknown	1929		White alabaster	19.5 x 22.5 x 5.5 cm	LH 73		

== 1930 to 1934 ==
Image	Title / subject	Location and coordinates	Date	Type	Material	Dimensions	Designation	Wikidata	Notes
	Head	Private collection	1930		Alabaster	20.3 cm high	LH 76		
	Figure	Private collection	1930		Ebony	25.4 cm high	LH 80		
	Mother and Child	Private collection	1930		Ancaster stone	25.4 cm high	LH 82		
	Mother and Child	Private collection	1930		Hamstone	78.7 cm high	LH 83		
More images	Reclining Woman	National Gallery of Canada	1930		Green Hornton stone	41.3 x 94.0 x 59.7 cm	LH 84		
	Reclining Figure	Ironstone & bronze - Sainsbury Centre for Visual Arts; Bronze - The Henry Moore Foundation, Private collection	1930		Ironstone; Bronze edition of three cast 1962	11.4 x 17.1 x 3.3 cm	LH 85		
	Head	Private collection	1930		Ironstone	15.5 cm high	LH 87		
	Head	Private collection	1930		Ironstone	20.3 cm high	LH 88		
	Head	Unknown	1930		Slate	25.4 cm high	LH 89		
	Reclining Figure	Unknown	1930		Corsehill stone	49.5 cm high	LH 90		
	Half Figure	National Gallery of Victoria	1930		Ancaster stone	49.4 x 35.0 x 23.0 cm	LH 91		
	Girl with Clasped Hands	British Council	1930		Cumberland alabaster	42.5 x 30.0 x 23.5 cm	LH 93		
	Reclining Figure	Detroit Institute of Arts	1930		Ancaster stone	53.3 cm long	LH 94		
	Mother and Child	Unknown	1930		Alabaster	25.4 cm high	LH 95		
	Suckling Child	Pallant House Gallery	1930		Alabaster	19.7 cm high	LH 96		
	Mother and Child	Private collection	1931		Cumberland alabaster	40.6 cm high	LH 97		
	Composition	Private collection	1931		Blue Hornton stone	48.3 cm high	LH 99		
	Mother and Child	Unknown	1931		Burgundy stone	35.6 cm high	LH 100		
	Reclining Figure	Lead - unknown; Bronze - Museo de Arte Moderno, The Henry Moore Foundation	1931		Lead, Bronze edition of six cast 1962	25.0 x 53.5 x 25.0 cm	LH 101		
More images	Composition	The Henry Moore Foundation	1931		Cumberland alabaster	37.5 x 44.0 x 27.9 cm	LH 102		
	Mother and Child	Hirshhorn Museum and Sculpture Garden	1931		Cumberland alabaster	44.5 x 22.7 x 17.5 cm	LH 105		
	Mother and Child	Hirshhorn Museum and Sculpture Garden	1931		Sycamore wood	76.2 cm high	LH 106		
	Mother and Child	Private collection	1931		Green marble	20.3 cm high	LH 107		
	Mother and Child	Shri Bhavani Museum	1931		Cumberland alabaster	45.5 cm high	LH 107a		
More images	Girl	Tate Britain	1931		Ancaster stone	86.5 x 60.0 x 43.3 cm	LH 109		
	Seated Girl	Private collection	1931		Anhydrite	44.5 cm high	LH 110		Later, an edition of plaster casts were created
More images	Figure	Tate Britain	1931		Beech wood	24.8 x 17.8 x 12.1 cm	LH 111		
	Girl	Dallas Museum of Art	1933		Boxwood	36.8 x 7.9 x 6.6 cm including base	LH 112		
	Figure	Private collection	1932		Boxwood	30.5 cm high	LH 113		
	Figure	Unknown	1932		Beech wood	36.2 cm high	LH 114		
More images	Half Figure	Tate	1932		Armenian marble	68.6 x 38.1 x 27.9 cm	LH 117		
More images	Composition	Tate	1932		African wonder stone	44.5 x 45.7 x 29.8 cm	LH 119		
	Mother and Child	Dallas Museum of Art	1932		Concrete	17.8 cm high	LH 120		
	Mother and Child	Sainsbury Centre for Visual Arts	1932		Green Hornton stone	99.5 x 53.5 x 38.0 cm	LH 121		
	Reclining Figure	Saint Louis Art Museum	1932		Concrete	109 cm long	LH 122		
	Head	Unknown	1932		Concrete	44.5 cm long	LH 123		
	Composition	Private collection	1932		Dark African wood	38.7 cm high	LH 128		
	Head and Shoulders	Unknown	1933		African wonder stone	25.4 cm high	LH 130		
	Composition	Unknown	1933		African wonder stone	33.0 cm long	LH 131		
	Composition	Walnut - Private collection; Bronze - The Henry Moore Foundation	1933		Walnut wood; Single bronze cast c.1972	35.6 x 23.0 x 15.0 cm	LH 132		
	Composition	British Council	1933		Carved concrete	59.0 x 40.0 x 29.0 cm	LH 133		
	Reclining Figure	Detroit Institute of Arts	1933		Carved concrete	52.7 x 80.0 x 31.1 cm	LH 134		
	Composition	Unknown	1933		Lignum vitae	45.7 cm high	LH 135		
	Figure	Unknown	1934		Travertine	40.5 cm high	LH 137		
	Figure	Unknown	1934		Corsehill stone	77.5 cm high	LH 138		
	Composition	Bronze -British Council, Hirshhorn Museum and Sculpture Garden, Nelson-Atkins Museum of Art, Arts Council England, Smart Museum of Art;- Bronze & concrete - The Henry Moore Foundation	1934		Concrete; Bronze edition of eleven cast 1961	19.5 x 42.5 x 20.0 cm	LH 140		
	Carving	The Henry Moore Foundation	1934		African wonder stone	11.9 x 10.4 X 7.5 cm	LH 142		
	Sculpture	Fogg Museum	1934		Ironstone	17.8 cm long	LH 145		
	Two Forms	Metropolitan Museum of Art	1934		Ironstone; Bronze edition of 7 cast 1967	18.4 cm high	LH 146		
	Three Piece Carving	Unknown	1934		Ebony	43.2 cm long	LH 149		
	Head and Bull	Henry Moore Foundation	1934		Cumberland alabaster	51.0 cm long	LH 151		
	Bird and Egg	Yale Center for British Art	1934		Cumberland alabaster	55.9 cm long	LH 152		
	Two Forms	MoMA New York	1934		Pynkado wood	53.3 cm long	LH 153		
More images	Four-Piece Composition: Reclining Figure	Tate Britain	1934		Cumberland alabaster on a Portland stone base	50.8 cm long	LH 154	Q28963242	
More images	Hole and Lump	The Henry Moore Foundation	1934		Elm wood	54.5 x 29.7 x 29.0 cm	LH 154a		
	Square Form	The Henry Moore Foundation	1934		Burgundy stone	31.7 x 29.0 x 25.0 cm	LH 154b		

== 1935 to 1939 ==
Image	Title / subject	Location and coordinates	Date	Type	Material	Dimensions	Designation	Wikidata	Notes
More images	Reclining Figure	The Henry Moore Family Trust	1935		Corsehill stone	62.2 cm long	LH 155		
	Carving	Israel Museum, The Henry Moore Foundation	1935		African wonder stone; Bronze edition of seven cast c.1945	15.2 cm high	LH 157		Original stone version destroyed
More images	Family	The Henry Moore Foundation	1935		Elm wood	99.4 x 43.5 x 22.0 cm	LH 157a		
More images	Carving	The Henry Moore Foundation	1935		Walnut wood	96.5 cm high	LH 158		
	Carving	Private collection	1935		African wood	40.6 cm high	LH 160		
	Sculpture	Art Institute of Chicago	1935		White marble	55.9 cm long	LH 161		
	Reclining Figure	Buffalo AKG Art Museum	1936		Elm wood	48.3 x 93.3 x 44.5 cm	LH 162		
	Head	Location unknown	1936		Hopton Wood Stone	26.7 cm high	LH 163		
	Carving	The Henry Moore Foundation	1936		Travertine	52.0 x 49.2 x 24.0 cm including base	LH 164		
	Mother and Child	British Council	1936		Brown Ancaster stone	50.0 x 33.0 x 27.0 cm	LH 165		
	Two Forms	The Henry Moore Foundation	1936		Brown Hornton stone	51.0 x 64.0 x 35.5 cm including base	LH 166		
	Square Form	Private Collection	1936		Brown Hornton stone	58.4 x 56.5 x 24.8 cm including base	LH 168		
	Carving	Private collection	1936		Brown Hornton stone	53.3 cm long	LH 169		
	Two Forms	Philadelphia Museum of Art	1936		Brown Hornton stone	106 cm high	LH 170		
	Mother and Child	Leeds Art Gallery	1936		Green Hornton stone	114.0 cm high	LH 171		
	Four Forms	Eskenazi Museum of Art	1936		African wonder stone	18.4 x 63.8 x 15.6 cm	LH 172		
	Sculpture to Hold	Kykuit	1936		Yew wood	33.0 cm long	LH 173		
More images	Reclining Figure	The Hepworth Wakefield	1936		Elm wood	106.7 cm long	LH 175		
	Carving	Unknown	1937		Bronze	30.5 cm long	LH 176		
	Head	Private collection	1937		Hopton Wood Stone	53.3 cm high	LH 177		
	Reclining Figure	Fogg Museum	1937		Hopton Wood Stone	83.8 cm long	LH 178		
	Sculpture	Metropolitan Museum of Art	1937		Hopton Wood Stone	52.7 x 50.8 x 50.8 cm	LH 179		
	Figure	Art Institute of Chicago	1937		Marble from Birdseye, Utah	50.8 cm high	LH 181		
More images	Stringed Relief	Beechwood - Private collection; Bronze - The Henry Moore Foundation	1937		Beechwood and string; Bronze edition of three cast 1976	49.5 cm long	LH 182		
	Head	The Henry Moore Foundation	1937		Plaster, Green Serpentinite carved 1968	33.7 x 22.0 x 12.8 cm	LH 182a		
	Stringed Figure	Hirshhorn Museum and Sculpture Garden	1937		Cherry wood and string	51.1 x 13.5 x 16.8 cm	LH 183		
	Reclining Figure	Nelson-Atkins Museum of Art, The Henry Moore Foundation	1937		Bronze, Later edition of nine cast 1968	7.1 x 18.1 x 3.5 cm	LH 183a		
	Recumbent Figure	Museum Ludwig, McNay Art Museum, The Henry Moore Foundation	1937		Clay, Lead edition of three cast 1937, Bronze editions of 10 c.1948 and of 11 in 1957-58	13.0 x 14.0 x 7.5 cm	LH 184		Maquette / sketch model for LH 191 (1938)
	Mother and Child	Plaster - Leeds Art Gallery, The Henry Moore Foundation; Bronze - The Museum of Modern Art, Gunma, The Henry Moore Foundation	1938		Plaster edition of two; Lead and string edition of two; Bronze edition of ten cast 1985	11.4 x 7.8 x 5.9 cm	LH 186		
	Reclining Figure: One Arm	Clay & bronze - The Henry Moore Foundation	1938		Clay, Lead, Bronze edition of ten cast 1968	12.2 x 31.0 x 5.4 cm	LH 186a		
	Stringed Figure	Plaster - The Henry Moore Foundation; Bronze - Arts Council England, Mead Art Museum, Tate	1938		Plaster and string; Bronze edition of 13 cast 1960	28.0 x 34.3 x 20.0 cm	LH 186b		
	Stringed Figure: Bowl	Yale University Art Gallery, Palm Springs Art Museum, The Henry Moore Foundation	1938		Bronze and string edition of ten cast 1967	53.0 x 23.0 x 25.5 cm	LH 186c		
	Stringed Figure	Lead - The Henry Moore Foundation; Bronze - Dallas Museum of Art, The Henry Moore Foundation	1938		Lead and string, Bronze and string edition of nine cast 1966	17.5 x 5.0 x 5.1 cm	LH 186e		
	Stringed Mother and Child	Private collections	1938		Lead and string, Bronze and string	12.1 cm long	LH 186f		
	Stringed Head	Art Gallery of Ontario, Israel Museum, Würth Collection, The Henry Moore Foundation - 2 casts	1938		Bronze and string edition of six cast c.1966	11.4 x 5.5 x 5.0 cm	LH 186g		Terracotta model in the Israel Museum
	Stringed Object	Peggy Guggenheim Collection, The Henry Moore Foundation	1938		Bronze and string edition of ten cast 1956	4.5 x 7.0 x 4.5 cm	LH 187		
	Head	2 Willow Road, Hampstead	1938		Elm and string	20.3 cm high	LH 188		
	Stringed Figure	Unknown	1938		Lignum vitae and string	35.6 cm high	LH 190		
More images	Recumbent Figure	Tate	1938		Green Hornton stone	88.9 x 132.7 x 73.7 cm	LH 191	Q28803293	
	Reclining Figure	Bronze - MoMA New York, Leeds Art Gallery, Peggy Guggenheim Collection	1938-46		Lead; Bronze edition of four cast 1938-46	33.0 cm long	LH 192		
	Mother and Child	MoMa New York	1938		Elm	91.4 cm high	LH 194		
	Head	Art Gallery of Ontario, The Henry Moore Foundation - 2 bronze casts	1939		Lead and string edition of two, Bronze edition of seven cast after 1968	14.0 cm high	LH 195		
	Stringed Reclining Figure	Plaster - Leeds Art Gallery; Bronze - University of Michigan Museum of Art	1939		Plaster and string, Bronze edition of eleven cast c.1956	25.4 cm long	LH 197		
	Stringed Ball	San Diego Museum of Art, Fogg Museum, The Henry Moore Foundation	1939		Lead and string; Bronze edition of ten cast c.1945	10.7 x 11.2 x 9.3cm	LH 198		
	Reclining Stringed Figure	The Henry Moore Foundation	1939		Plaster and string	9.5 x 25.7 x 10.0 cm	LH 199a		
	Mother and Child	Lead & wire - Fogg Museum; Bronzes - Baltimore Museum of Art, Montreal Museum of Fine Arts, The Henry Moore Foundation	1939		Lead and wire; Bronze and string edition of ten cast c.1957	18.0 x 19.1 x 6.7 cm	LH 201		
	Reclining Figure	Lead - Tate Britain; Bronze - British Council, The Henry Moore Foundation	1939		Terracotta, lead, bronze edition of four cast 1949-56	29.8 cm long	LH 202		
	Reclining Figure: Blanket	Plaster - The Henry Moore Foundation; Bronze - British Council	1939		Plaster, Lead, Bronze editions of 3 cast after 1945; of 9 cast 1959	11.0 x 21.0 x 12.0 cm	LH 203		
More images	Bird Basket	The Henry Moore Foundation	1939		Lignum vitae and string	37.5 x 41.9 x 23.4 cm	LH 205		
	Stringed Figure	Lead - The Henry Moore Foundation; Bronze - Leeds Art Gallery	1939		Lead and string, Bronze edition of ten cast after 1945	14.8 x 30.0 x 11.3 cm	LH 206		
	Stringed Figure	Bronze - The Henry Moore Foundation (2 casts); Plaster - The Henry Moore Foundation	1938		Lead and wire, Bronze edition of ten cast 1968, Plaster cast 1968	21.0 X 21.0 X 14.3 cm	LH 207		
More images	Reclining Figure	Detroit Institute of Arts	1939		Elm wood	205.8 cm long	LH 210	Q19759259	
More images	The Helmet	Lead - Scottish National Gallery of Modern Art; Bronze - The Henry Moore Foundation	1939-40		Lead, Bronze	31 x 24.5 x 15.5 cm	LH 212		

== 1940 to 1944 ==
Image	Title / subject	Location and coordinates	Date	Type	Material	Dimensions	Designation	Wikidata	Notes
More images	Reclining Figure: Snake	Bronze - The Henry Moore Foundation	1940		Lead, Bronze edition of nine cast c.1959	13.6 x 30.6 x 10.7 cm	LH 208a		
	Three Points	Plaster and Cast iron - The Henry Moore Foundation, Bronze - Tate, Palm Springs Art Museum	1940		Plaster, Lead 1939-40; Cast iron before 1957; Bronze edition of two before 1949, bronze edition of nine 1959	17.0 x 24.1 x 13.2 cm	LH 211		
	The Bride	MoMA New York, Private collection	1940		Lead and copper wire edition of two	23.8 x 10.3 x 10.0 cm	LH 213		
	Madonna and Child	Terracotta - Private collection. Bronze - Tate, Museum of Fine Arts, Boston, The Henry Moore Foundation	1943		Terracotta, Bronze edition of eight cast 1945-55	13.9 x 7.3 x 7.2 cm	LH 216		
	Madonna and Child	Bronze - Tate, The Henry Moore Foundation	1943		Terracotta, Bronze edition of seven cast 1944-45	18.2 x 15.0 x 6.4 cm	LH 222		Sketch model for LH 270
	Madonna and Child	Bronze - Museum of Fine Arts, Boston, Tate, Museum of Art Fort Lauderdale	1943		Terracotta, Bronze edition of eight cast c.1945	14.5 x 5.5 x 6.5 cm	LH 223		
	Madonna and Child	Bronze - British Council, Northampton Museum and Art Gallery, Tate Britain, Sainsbury Centre for Visual Arts, Yale Center for British Art	1943		Terracotta, Bronze edition of eight cast c.1945	15.5 x 8.4 x 6.6 cm	LH 224		Sketch model for LH 226
	Madonna and Child	Bronze - The Henry Moore Foundation	1943		Terracotta, Bronze edition of seven cast c.1945	15.9 cm high	LH 225		
More images	Madonna and Child	St Matthew's Church, Northampton	1944		Hornton stone	150 cm high	LH 226		
	Family Group	Bronze - Neue Nationalgalerie, Tate	1944		Terracotta, Bronze edition of eight cast 1945	18.1 cm high	LH 227		Model for LH 364
	Family Group	Bronze - David Owsley Museum of Art	1944		Terracotta, Bronze edition of eight cast 1945	20.0 cm high	LH 229		
	Family Group	Terracotta - The Henry Moore Foundation; Bronze - San Diego Museum of Art, Nelson-Atkins Museum of Art	1944		Terracotta, Bronze edition of ten cast 1956	15.8 cm high	LH 231		Model for LH 364
	Family Group	The Henry Moore Foundation	1944		Terracotta	16.2 cm high	LH 232		
	Family Group	Terracotta - Private collection, Bronze - Aberdeen Art Gallery, Montreal Museum of Fine Arts, MoMA New York, San Francisco Museum of Modern Art	1944		Terracotta, Bronze edition of ten cast 1956	14.9 x 12.7 x 7.0 cm	LH 233		

== 1945 to 1949 ==
Image	Title / subject	Location and coordinates	Date	Type	Material	Dimensions	Designation	Wikidata	Notes
	Family Group	Bronze - University of Hull, Montreal Museum of Fine Arts, Peggy Guggenheim Collection	1945		Terracotta, Bronze editions of seven cast c.1945, of ten cast 1955-57	14.7 x 11.0 x 7.7 cm	LH 235		Sketch model for LH 265
	Family Group	Private collections	1945		Terracotta, Bronze edition of ten cast 1969	14.0 cm high	LH 237		
	Family Group	Cleveland Museum of Art, Tate Britain	1945		Bronze edition of eight	17.8 x 10.2 x 6.0 cm	LH 238		
	Two Women and a Child	San Diego Museum of Art, Auckland Art Gallery, Hirshhorn Museum and Sculpture Garden	1945		Bronze edition of eight	16.5 x 11.8 x 7.2 cm	LH 241		Also known as Two Seated Women and a Child
	Reclining Figure	The Henry Moore Foundation	1944		Terracotta	15.2 cm long	LH 247		Working model for LH 263
	Reclining Figure	Allen Memorial Art Museum	1945		Bronze edition of eight	16.5 x 38.1 x 13.3 cm	LH 256		
	Reclining Figure	Bronze - San Francisco Museum of Modern Art	1945		Terracotta, Bronze edition of seven	44.5 cm long	LH 257		
	Three Standing Figures	Plaster - Tate; Clay - The Henry More Foundation; Bronze - San Francisco Museum of Modern Art, Smith College Museum of Art, Wadsworth Atheneum	1945		Clay, Plaster, Terracotta, Bronze edition of six	22.9 x 16.5 x 10.2 cm	LH 258		Maquette for LH 268
	Family Group	Plaster - The Henry More Foundation; Bronze - British Council, Ca' Pesaro, The Henry Moore Foundation	1945		Plaster, Bronze edition of ten	23.1 x 18.4 x 12.1 cm	LH 259		Working model for LH 269
More images	Memorial Figure	Dartington Hall	1946		Hornton stone	142.3 cm long	LH 262	Q17533280	
	Reclining Figure	Location unknown	1946		Elm wood	190.0 cm	LH 263		
More images	Three Standing Figures	Battersea Park	1948		Darley Dale stone	213.0 cm high	LH 268	Q19691893	
More images	Family Group	Barclay Academy, Tate Britain, MoMA New York, Hakone Open-Air Museum, Norton Simon Museum, The Henry Moore Foundation	1948-49		Bronze edition of five cast 1948, one cast c.1985	152.0 x 113.0 x 76.0 cm with base	LH 269	Q19760121	
More images	Mother and Child	Heidelberg Children’s Hospital, The Henry Moore Foundation	1949		Bronze edition of two	81.0 cm high	LH 269b		Derived from LH 269
More images	Claydon Madonna and Child	St Mary and St Peter's Church, Barham	1949		Hornton stone	122.0 cm high	LH 270	Q19758868	
	Seated Figure: Armless	Plaster - Art Gallery of Ontario, The Henry Moore Foundation; Bronze - The Henry Moore Foundation	1949		Plaster edition of two, Bronze edition of four	23.2 x 10.6 x 11.6 cm	LH 272a		

== 1950 to 1954 ==
Image	Title / subject	Location and coordinates	Date	Type	Material	Dimensions	Designation	Wikidata	Notes
	Rocking Chair No. 2	Hirshhorn Museum and Sculpture Garden	1950		Bronze edition of seven	28.0 x 31.3 x 8.2 cm	LH 275		
	Rocking Chair No. 4: Miniature	Manchester Art Gallery	1950		Bronze edition of ten cast 1952	14.3 x 12.0 x 4.0 cm	LH 277		
	Helmet Head No.1	Lead - The Henry Moore Foundation; Bronze - MoMA New York, Tate Britain, The Higgins Art Gallery & Museum, David and Alfred Smart Museum of Art	1950		Lead edition of two; Bronze edition of ten cast 1960	40.0 x 35.5 x 30.0 cm	LH 279		
More images	Helmet Head No.2	Lead -Staatsgalerie Stuttgart; Bronze - Ca' Pesaro, Art Gallery of New South Wales, Art Gallery of Ontario, Palm Springs Desert Museum, Kunstmuseum Bochum	1950		Lead, Bronze edition of ten cast 1955	33.8 x 23.7 x 24.0 cm	LH 281		
	Small Helmet Head	Private collection	1950		Bronze	14.5 cm high	LH 283		
	Maquette for Openwork Head No.1	Private collection	1950		Bronze	18.0 cm high	LH 284		
	Openwork Head and Shoulders	Private collection	1950		Bronze	45.5 x 39.0 x 26.0 cm	LH 287		
	Maquette for Openwork Head No.2	Private collection	1950		Bronze	14.5 x 8.5 x 5.5 cm	LH 288		
	Maquette for Strapwork Head	Lead - Private collection; Bronze - Gori Collection, The Henry Moore Foundation	1950		Lead, Bronze edition of ten cast 1972	11.5 x 10.0 x 8.8 cm with base	LH 289a		
More images	Standing Figure	Bronze - Keswick Estate, Saint Louis Art Museum; Fibreglass - The Henry Moore Foundation	1950		Bronze edition of four; fibreglass 1971	230.0 x 61.0 x 54.0 cm with base	LH 290	Q19760179	
	Working model for Reclining Figure: Festival	The Henry Moore Foundation	1950		Bronze edition of eight	43.0 cm long	LH 292		
More images	Reclining Figure: Festival	Plaster - Tate, Art Gallery of Ontario; Bronze - Scottish National Gallery of Modern Art, Musee d'Art Moderne de la Ville de Paris	1951		Plaster edition of two, Bronze edition of six	106.0 x 228.6 x 73.7 cm	LH 293	Q18209516	
More images	Upright Internal/External Form: Flower	Plaster -The Henry Moore Foundation; Bronze - Hakone Open-Air Museum, Didrichsen Art Museum	1951		Plaster, Bronze edition of seven cast 1965	76.5 cm high	LH 293b		
More images	Upright Internal/External Form	Plaster- Tate; Plaster with surface colour - The Henry Moore Foundation; Bronze - Hamburger Kunsthalle	1953		Plaster, Bronze edition of four cast 1958-60	201.5 x 68.0 x 75.0 cm	LH 296		
More images	Interior Form	Plaster - The Henry Moore Foundation; Bronze - Mary and Leigh Block Museum of Art	1951		Plaster, Bronze edition of eight cast 1981	145.0 x 48.0 x 48.0 cm	LH 296a		
	Upright Internal/External Form	Buffalo AKG Art Museum	1954		Elm wood	261.0 cm high	LH 297		
More images	Large Upright Internal/External Form	Bronze - The Henry Moore Foundation	1954		Polystyrene; Bronze edition of two cast 1981-82	673.0 cm high	LH 297a		
More images	Large Interior Form	Bronze - Nelson-Atkins Museum of Art, Trinity University, Würth Collection, Art Institute of Chicago, The Henry Moore Foundation	1954		Polystyrene; Bronze edition of seven cast 1981	498.0 cm high	LH 297b	Q6489055	
More images	Reclining Figure: External Form	Israel Museum, Toledo Museum of Art, Vermögen und Bau, Baden-Württemberg, Galleria Nazionale d'Arte Moderna, Virginia Museum of Fine Arts, Museo Nacional de Bellas Artes	1954		Bronze edition of seven cast 1957	110.0 x 213.0 x 85.0 cm	LH 299	Q19760164	
	Animal Head	Plaster - Tate; Bronze - The Henry Moore Foundation	1951		Plaster, Bronze edition of nine	27.0 x 29.0 x 20.0 cm	LH 301		
	Goat's Head	Plaster & bronze - The Henry Moore Foundation	1952		Plaster edition of two; Bronze edition of eleven	20.6 x 8.5 x 14.4 cm	LH 302		
	Helmet Head and Shoulders	Plasticine - The Henry Moore Foundation; Bronze - Cleveland Museum of Art, Tate Britain, Pallant House Gallery	1952		Plasticine, Bronze edition of twelve	20.2 x 14.6 x 12.7 cm	LH 304		
	Mother and Child on Ladderback Rocking Chair	Private collections	1952		Bronze edition of ten	21.0 cm high	LH 312		
More images	Mother and Child on Ladderback Chair	Ferens Art Gallery, McNay Art Museum	1952		Bronze edition of eight	40.5 cm high	LH 313		
	Maquette for Mother and Child	The Henry Moore Foundation	1952		Bronze edition of ten	21.6 cm high	LH 314		
	Mother and Child	Tate Britain, Hirshhorn Museum and Sculpture Garden	1953		Bronze edition of nine	50.8 x 23.0 x 23.5 cm	LH 315		
	Standing Figure No.1	Israel Museum, Hirshhorn Museum and Sculpture Garden	1952		Bronze edition of ten	24.1 x 3.9 x 4.4 cm	LH 317		
	Standing Figure No.2	Private collections	1952		Bronze edition of ten	28.0 cm high	LH 318		
	Standing Figure No.4	The Henry Moore Foundation	1952		Bronze edition of ten	27.9 x 10.1 x 10.1 cm with base	LH 320		
	Maquette for Three Standing Figures	Private collections, unknown locations	1952		Bronze edition of eight	25.4 x 24.1 x 8.8 cm	LH 321		
	Three Standing Figures	Blanden Memorial Art Museum Iowa, Peggy Guggenheim Museum, Norton Simon Art Museum, Hakone Open-Air Museum, Hamburger Kunsthalle	1953		Bronze edition of nine	73.0 x 67.0 x 28.5 cm	LH 322		
	Leaf Figure No.4	University of Iowa Museum of Art, Hirshhorn Museum and Sculpture Garden, Museo Nacional Centro de Arte Reina Sofia	1952		Bronze edition of twelve cast 1955	47.8 x 13.2 x 19.6 cm	LH 326		
	Reclining Figure No.1	Plaster - The Henry Moore Foundation	1954		Plaster, Bronze edition of ten	20.5 cm long	LH 327		
More images	Reclining Figure No.2	Plaster - The Henry Moore Foundation; Bronze- Hugh Lane Gallery, Winnipeg Art Gallery, Nelson-Atkins Museum of Art, Israel Museum	1953		Plaster with surface colour, Bronze edition of eight cast 1953	91.4 cm long	LH 329		
	Reclining Figure No.3	Plaster - The Henry Moore Foundation	1952		Plaster, Bronze edition of twelve	21.6 long	LH 330		
	Reclining Figure No.4	Plaster - The Henry Moore Foundation; Bronze - Metropolitan Museum of Art, Hirshhorn Museum and Sculpture Garden, Royal Museums of Fine Arts of Belgium	1954		Plaster with surface colour, Bronze edition of eight	39.4 x 59.7 x 31.8 cm	LH 332		
	Draped Reclining Figure: Fragment	The Henry Moore Foundation	1953		Bronze edition of ten	9.7 x 16.7 x 7.8 cm	LH 332a		
	Reclining Figure No.5	Private collections, unknown locations	1952		Bronze edition of ten	22.0 cm long	LH 333		
More images	Draped Reclining Figure	Plaster - Art Gallery of Ontario; Bronze - The Henry Moore Foundation, Hirshhorn Museum and Sculpture Garden, Museum Ludwig, Time Life, London; Concrete - The Henry Moore Foundation	1953		Plaster, Bronze edition of four, Concrete	110.0 x 157.5 x 87.5 cm	LH 336	Q5305835	
	Working model for Time-Life Screen	The Henry Moore Foundation	1952		Bronze edition of ten	101.0 cm long	LH 343		
More images	Time/Life Screen	New Bond Street, London	1953		Portland stone	808.0 cm long	LH 344	Q19759467	
More images	King and Queen	Middelheim Open Air Sculpture Museum, Keswick Estate, Hirshhorn Museum and Sculpture Garden, Norton Simon Museum, Tate Britain, MOA Museum of Art, The Henry Moore Foundation	1953		Bronze edition of seven cast 1952-85	167.0 x 140.0 x 85.5 cm	LH 350	Q16980945	
More images	Head	St Andrew's Church, Much Hadham	1953		Corsham stone	35.5 cm high	LH 356a		
More images	Head	St Andrew's Church, Much Hadham	1953		Corsham stone	35.5 cm high	LH 356b		
More images	Warrior with Shield	Bronze - Art Gallery of Ontario, City of Arnhem, British Institute of Florence, Birmingham Museum and Art Gallery, Minneapolis Institute of Art, Staditsche Kunsthalle	1954		Painted plaster, Bronze edition of seven	153.0 x 72.0 x 92.0 cm	LH 360	Q19760210	
	Seated Torso	Plaster & bronze- The Henry Moore Foundation	1954		Plaster, Bronze edition of ten cast 1956	40.0 x 47.0 x 25.0 cm	LH 362		
	Bird	Art Gallery of Ontario, The Henry Moore Foundation	1954		Bronze edition of thirteen cast 1955-61	7.4 x 14.6 x 8.0 cm	LH 393		

== 1955 to 1959 ==
Image	Title / subject	Location and coordinates	Date	Type	Material	Dimensions	Designation	Wikidata	Notes
More images	Harlow Family Group	Harlow Art Trust	1955		Hadene stone	163.0 cm high	LH 364	Q19759024	
	Wall Relief: Maquette No 1	The Henry Moore Foundation	1955		Bronze edition of thirteen	57.0 cm long	LH 365		
	Three Forms Relief	Plaster - The Henry Moore Foundation; Bronze - Israel Museum	1955		Plaster, Bronze edition of twelve cast 1960	18.5 x 32.5 x 2.0 cm	LH 374		
More images	Wall Relief no. 1	Bouwcentrum, Rotterdam	1955		Brick	18.6 X 8.4 metres	LH 375	Q19883765	
	Upright Motive: Maquette No 1	The Henry Moore Foundation	1955		Bronze edition of eleven	30.5 cm high	LH 376		
More images	Upright Motive No. 1: Glenkiln Cross	Plaster - Art Gallery of Ontario; Bronze - Keswick Estate, Kroller-Muller Museum, Amon Carter Museum of American Art, Hirshhorn Museum and Sculpture Garden, Museum Folkwang, Maschpark, Hannover, Yorkshire Sculpture Park	1956		Plaster, Bronze edition of seven	332.7 x 97.8 x 96.5 cm	LH 377	Q7899201	
More images	Upright Motive No. 2	Plaster - unknown; Bronze - Kröller-Müller Museum, Yorkshire Sculpture Park, Municipality of Jeddah, Amon Carter Museum of American Art, Harlow Art Trust	1956		Plaster, Bronze edition of six cast 1958-62	335.3 x 76.8 x 97.2 cm	LH 379	Q19760206	
More images	Upright Motive No.5	Plaster - The Henry Moore Foundation; Bronze - Norton Simon Museum, Montreal Museum of Fine Arts, Art Gallery of Ontario, The Henry Moore Foundation, Pt. Leo Estate Sculpture Park	1956		Plaster, Bronze edition of seven	213.5 x 59.0 x 47.0 cm	LH 383		
More images	Upright Motive No.7	Plaster - Unknown; Bronze - Kröller-Müller Museum, Israel Museum, Amon Carter Museum of American Art, Yorkshire Sculpture Park, The Henry Moore Foundation	1956		Plaster, Bronze edition of six cast 1958-61	340.0 x 97.0 x 76.0 cm	LH 386	Q19760207	
More images	Upright Motive No.8	Plaster - Art Gallery of Ontario; Bronze - National Museum Cardiff, Norton Simon Museum, University of Tennessee, Fogg Museum, Columbia Museum of Art, The Henry Moore Foundation	1956		Plaster, Bronze edition of eight	207.0 x 60.0 x 56.5 cm	LH 388		
More images	Animal Head	Plaster - Art Gallery of Ontario; Bronze - Kröller-Müller Museum, Tate, Nelson-Atkins Museum of Art, Museum Ostwall, The Henry Moore Foundation	1956		Plaster, Bronze edition of eleven cast c.1957-62	57.0 x 51.5 x 29.0 cm	LH 396	Q19758839	
	Head: Lines	Bolton Art Gallery, Library & Museum, Arts Council of England	1955		Bronze edition of seven	29.9 x 26.0 x 25.9 cm	LH 397		
More images	Reclining Figure	Plaster - Art Gallery of Ontario; Bronze - Academy of Arts, Berlin, Norton Simon Museum, Donald M. Kendall Sculpture Gardens, Art Gallery of Western Australia, Palm Springs Art Museum, Sainsbury Centre for Visual Arts	1956		Plaster, Bronze edition of nine cast 1961-63	95.0 x 244.0 x 101.5 cm	LH 402	Q19760157	
	Upright Figure	Solomon R. Guggenheim Museum	1956-60		Elm wood	274.5 cm high	LH 403		
	Maquette for Fallen Warrior	The Henry Moore Foundation	1956		Bronze edition of eleven	22.9 cm long	LH 404		
More images	Falling Warrior	Clare College, Cambridge, Tate Britain, Huddersfield Art Gallery, Walker Art Gallery, Art Institute of Chicago, Hakone Open-Air Museum, Hirshhorn Museum and Sculpture Garden, Bavarian State Painting Collections	1957		Bronze edition of eleven	65.0 x 154.0 cm x 85.0 cm	LH 405		Plaster of shield - Henry Moore Foundation
	Mother and Child with Apple	Israel Museum, Fitzwilliam Museum (loan from private collection)	1956		Bronze edition of eleven	72.0 x 45.0 x 50.0 cm	LH 406		
	Mother with Child on Knee	Private collections / unknown	1956		Bronze edition of twelve	19.7 x 9.1 x 7.6 cm	LH 409		
	Seated Woman: One Arm	Plaster & bronze - The Henry Moore Foundation	1956		Plaster, Bronze edition of ten	14.8 x 17.2 x 8.5 cm	LH 410		
	Draped Reclining Figure	Plaster - The Henry Moore Foundation; Bronze - Montreal Museum of Fine Arts	1957		Plaster, Bronze edition of eleven	6.4 x 15.7 x 4.8 cm	LH 411		
	Reclining Figure: Goujon	Plaster - The Henry Moore Foundation; Bronze - Art Gallery of Ontario, The Henry Moore Foundation	1956		Plaster, Bronze edition of ten cast 1971	17.7 x 24.0 x 9.5 cm	LH 411a		
	Reclining Figure	Private collections	1958		Bronze edition of thirteen	70.0 cm high	LH 413		
	Maquette for UNESCO Reclining Figure	Plaster - Art Gallery of Ontario, Bronze - The Henry Moore Foundation, Leeds Art Gallery	1956		Plaster, Bronze edition of six cast 1957	16.2 x 21.6 x 11.4 cm	LH 414		
More images	Working Model for UNESCO Reclining Figure	Plaster - Art Gallery of Ontario; Bronze - Kunsthaus Zürich, Tate Britain, Carnegie Museum of Art, Art Institute of Chicago, Stedelijk Museum Amsterdam	1957		Plaster, Bronze edition of seven	238.0 cm long	LH 415	Q19760228	
More images	UNESCO Reclining Figure	UNESCO Headquarters, Paris	1958		Travertine marble	508.0 cm long	LH 416	Q19759528	
	Seated Woman with Book	Plaster - The Henry Moore Foundation	1956		Plaster, Bronze edition of ten cast 1964	20.0 cm high	LH 418b		
	Woman with Cats	The Henry Moore Foundation, Private collection	1957		Bronze edition of two	21.0 x 21.2 x 21.6 cm	LH 419		
	Seated Girl	Israel Museum, The Henry Moore Foundation	1956		Bronze edition of ten	21.3 x 13.2 x 19.1 cm	LH 420		
	Seated Figure against Curved Wall	Plaster - The Henry Moore Foundation; Bronze - Art Gallery of South Australia, Arts Council of England, Boston Museum of Fine Arts, Dudmaston Hall, Hirshhorn Museum and Sculpture Garden	1956-57		Plaster, Bronze edition of thirteen	52.0 x 92.0 x 53.5 cm	LH 422		
	Girl Seated against Square Wall	Plaster - The Henry Moore Foundation; Bronze - Norton Simon Museum, University of Arizona Museum of Art, Frederick R. Weisman Art Foundation	1958		Plaster, Bronze edition of thirteen cast c.1958-63	106.7 x 85.4 x 71.4 cm	LH 425		
	Working model for Draped Seated Woman: Figure on Steps	The Henry Moore Foundation	1956		Painted plaster with paper & hessian on metal support	65.0 cm high	LH 427		
More images	Draped Seated Woman	Plaster - Art Gallery of Ontario; Bronze - Tate Britain, National Gallery of Victoria, Hebrew University of Jerusalem, Kunst und Museumsverein, Wuppertal, Canary Wharf, Yale University Art Gallery, Royal Museums of Fine Arts of Belgium	1958		Plaster, Bronze edition of seven cast c.1958-63	184.2 x 215.9 x 145.7 cm	LH 428	Q1216286	
More images	Draped Reclining Woman	Plaster - Art Gallery of Ontario; Bronze - Staatsgalerie Stuttgart, Glyndebourne on loan from Tate, Norton Simon Museum, Sainsbury Centre for Visual Arts, Bavarian State Painting Collections	1958		Plaster, Bronze edition of seven	134.6 x 208.3 x 91.4 cm	LH 431	Q1214557	
	Seated Woman with Crossed Feet	Plaster - Art Gallery of Ontario; Bronze - The Henry Moore Foundation	1957		Bronze edition of seven cast 1965	17.4 x 18.5 x 6.7 cm	LH 432		
More images	Seated Woman on Curved Block	Bronze - Nelson-Atkins Museum of Art, The Henry Moore Foundation	1957		Plaster, Bronze edition of seven cast 1964-65	30.2 x 19.2 x 13.6 cm	LH 433		
	Working Model for Seated Woman	The Henry Moore Foundation, Pola Museum of Art	1956		Bronze edition of ten cast 1980	76.0 cm high	LH 433b		
More images	Seated Woman	Plaster - Tate; Bronze - Hakone Open Air Museum, Nelson Atkins Museum of Art, Hirshhorn Museum and Sculpture Garden, Neues Museum	1957		Plaster, Bronze edition of seven cast 1957-62	157.5 x 142.9 x 105.1 cm	LH 435	Q7441988	
	Seated Figure on Circular Steps	Princeton University Art Museum, Nelson Atkins Museum of Art	1957		Bronze edition of ten	18.0 x 31.7 x 20.2 cm	LH 437		
	Armless Seated Figure against Round Wall	Plaster -The Henry Moore Foundation; Bronze - Hirshhorn Museum and Sculpture Garden	1957		Plaster with surface colour, Bronze edition of thirteen	25.2 x 25.5 x 19.0 cm	LH 438		
More images	Woman	Tate Britain, Israel Museum, Montreal Museum of Fine Arts, Portland Art Museum, Museum Ludwig, British Council, Palm Springs Art Museum	1958		Bronze edition of nine	144.1 x 79.1 x 92.1 cm	LH 439	Q19760212	
	Mother and Child	Plaster, Plaster on flint, Bronze - The Henry Moore Foundation	1958		Plaster, Plaster on flint, Bronze edition of eight cast 1974	13.7 cm high	LH 439a		
	Seated Woman	Plaster - The Henry Moore Foundation; Bronze - Nelson-Atkins Museum of Art, J. Paul Getty Museum, City of Herning, The Henry Moore Foundation	1958-59		Plaster, Bronze edition of seven cast 1975	207.0 x 97.5 x 116.0 cm	LH 440		
	Three Motives against Wall No.1	Plaster - The Henry Moore Foundation; Bronze - National Gallery of Art, Tate, The Henry Moore Foundation	1959		Plaster, Bronze edition of thirteen	47.0 x 106.5 x 42.0 cm	LH 441		
	Three Motives against Wall No.2	Plaster - Art Gallery of Ontario; Bronze - Tate, Nelson-Atkins Museum of Art, The Henry Moore Foundation	1959		Plaster, Bronze edition of eleven	52.0 x 107.0 x 38.0 cm with base	LH 442		
	Bird	Plaster - The Henry Moore Foundation; Bronze - Tate, Palm Springs Art Museum, Norton Simon Museum	1959		Plaster, Bronze edition of four	12.1 x 37.5 x 13.0 cm	LH 445		
	Horse	Plaster & bronze - The Henry Moore Foundation	1959		Plaster, Bronze edition of two	19.0 cm high	LH 447		
	Rearing Horse	Plaster - The Henry Moore Foundation; Bronze - Art Gallery of Ontario, The Henry Moore Foundation	1959		Plaster, bronze edition of ten cast 1972	13.0 x 9.5 x 3.3 cm	LH 447a		
More images	Relief No. 1	Plaster - The Henry Moore Foundation; Bronze - Israel Museum, Tate, Norton Simon Museum, Art Gallery of Ontario, The Henry Moore Foundation	1959		Plaster, Bronze edition of seven	231.0 x 136.5 x 76.0 cm	LH 450	Q19760168	
More images	Reclining Figure	The Henry Moore Foundation	1959, completed 1964		Elm wood	114.5 x 261.5 x 91.0 cm	LH 452		
	Mother and Child: Arch	Plaster - Art Gallery of Ontario; Bronze - Bolton Museum, The Henry Moore Foundation	1959		Plaster, Bronze edition of seven cast 1967	56.0 x 56.0 x 34.0 cm with base	LH 453a		
More images	Two Piece Reclining Figure No. 1	Fibreglass - Keswick Estate; Bronze - Lehmbruck Museum, Saint Louis Art Museum, Buffalo AKG Art Museum, Chelsea College of Art and Design, Hakone Open Air Museum	1959		Bronze edition of eight, Fibreglass	193.0 cm high	LH 457	Q19760168	
	Maquette for Two Piece Reclining Figure No.1	Plaster - unknown; Bronze - The Henry Moore Foundation (2 casts)	1959		Plaster, Bronze edition of ten cast 1974	10.9 x 15.3 x 10.4 cm	LH 457a		

== 1960 to 1964 ==
Image	Title / subject	Location and coordinates	Date	Type	Material	Dimensions	Designation	Wikidata	Notes
	Fledgling	Henry Moore Foundation	1960		Bronze edition of ten	11.1 x 17.0 x 9.0 cm long	LH 446		
	Headless Animal	Plaster - The Henry Moore Foundation; Bronze - Nelson-Atkins Museum of Art, Tate, Art Gallery of Ontario, The Henry Moore Foundation	1960		Plaster, Bronze edition of seven cast 1964	15.8 x 22.4 x 9.4 cm	LH 449		
	Sheep	Plaster & bronze - The Henry Moore Foundation	1960		Plaster, Bronze edition of ten cast 1968	24.0 cm long	LH 449a		
	Two Seated Figures against Wall	Plaster - Art Gallery of Ontario; Bronze - Arkansas Arts Center, Palm Springs Art Museum	1960		Plaster, Bronze edition of thirteen	48.2 cm high	LH 454		
	Maquette for Seated Figure: Arms Outstretched	Plaster - The Henry Moore Foundation; Bronze - Montreal Museum of Fine Arts, MoMA New York	1960		Plaster, Bronze edition of ten	14.0 x 11.5 x 11.5 cm	LH 463		
	Working Model for Seated Figure: Arms Outstretched	Plaster & bronze - The Henry Moore Foundation	1960		Plaster, Bronze edition of ten cast 1984	61.0 x 51.0 x 51.0 cm	LH 463a		
	Square Head	University of Arizona Museum of Art	1960		Bronze edition of eleven	31.0 x 16.5 x 9.5 cm	LH 466		
	Helmet Head No.3	Plaster - The Henry Moore Foundation; Bronze - Yale Center for British Art, The Broad, Hirshhorn Museum and Sculpture Garden, Fitzwilliam Museum, Arts Council of England, The Henry Moore Foundation	1960		Plaster, Bronze edition of fourteen	35.0 x 32.0 x 28.0 cm	LH 467		
	Sculptural Object	Plaster - Art Gallery of Ontario; Bronze - Smith College Museum of Art, Kettle's Yard, Arts Council of England, Government Art Collection	1960		Plaster, Bronze	46.5 x 39.0 x 37.0 cm	LH 469		
More images	Three Part Object	Plaster;- The Henry Moore Foundation; Bronze - City of Yokohama, Tate, Nelson-Atkins Museum of Art, Collezione Maramotti, The Henry Moore Foundation	1960		Bronze edition of ten	123.2 x 71.1 x 63.5 cm	LH 470		
	Three-Quarter Figure	Plaster -Tate, Bronze -The Henry Moore Foundation	1961		Plaster, Bronze edition of ten	38.0 cm high	LH 487		
	Reclining Figure on Pedestal	Plaster - Art Gallery of Ontario; Bronze - Museo de Bellas Artes (Caracas), Didrichsen Art Museum, Binghamton University Art Museum	1960		Plaster, Bronze edition of ten cast 1960-63	130.0 cm high	LH 456		
More images	Two Piece Reclining Figure No. 2	Plaster - Art Gallery of Ontario; Bronze - Kröller-Müller Museum, Saint Louis Art Museum, MoMA New York, Tate, Scottish National Gallery of Modern Art, Modern Art Museum of Fort Worth, The Henry Moore Foundation	1960		Plaster, Bronze edition of eight	135.0 x 259.0 x 140.0 cm	LH 458	Q19760195	
	Seated Woman: Thin Neck	Bronze - Laing Art Gallery, Des Moines Arts Center, Toyota Municipal Museum of Art	1961		Plaster, Bronze edition of eight cast 1966	170.2 x 81.4 x 101.5 cm	LH 472		
More images	Two Piece Reclining Figure No. 3	Plaster - Art Gallery of Ontario; Bronze - Brandon Estate, Dallas Museum of Art, Everson Museum of Art, Franklin D. Murphy Sculpture Garden, Sainsbury Centre for Visual Arts, Palm Springs Art Museum, City of Gothenburg	1961		Plaster, Bronze edition of eight cast 1961-64	239.0 cm long	LH 478	Q19760198	
	Two Piece Reclining Figure No.4	Plaster - Art Gallery of Ontario; Bronze - Buffalo AKG Art Museum, Stedelijk Museum Amsterdam, The Hepworth Wakefield, Winnipeg Art Gallery, MoMA New York	1961		Plaster, Bronze edition of nine	69.5 x 109.6 x 58.9 cm	LH 479		
	Reclining Mother and Child	Plaster - unknown; Bronze - Walker Art Center, Sara Hildén Art Museum	1961		Plaster, Bronze edition of eight cast 1967	132.1 x 228.6 x 35.5 cm	LH 480		
	Working Model for Standing Figure: Knife Edge	Plaster - The Henry Moore Foundation; Bronze - Hakone Open-Air Museum, Neu Oper, Frankfurt Am Main, Hirshhorn Museum and Sculpture Garden; Fibreglass - Art Gallery of Ontario, The Henry Moore Foundation	1961		Plaster, Bronze edition of eight cast 1964, fibreglass edition of three cast 1973	170.2 cm high	LH 481		
More images	Standing Figure: Knife Edge	Bronze - St Stephen's Green, Norton Simon Museum, Kreeger Museum, City of Essen, Walker Art Center	1961		Plaster, Bronze edition of eight cast 1961-64	297.2 x 116.8 x 109.2 cm	LH 482	Q19760180	
More images	Large Standing Figure: Knife Edge	Bronze - Greenwich Park on loan from The Henry Moore Foundation, North Carolina Museum of Art, National Museum of Art, Osaka, Henie Onstad Kunstsenter, Stiftung Landis and Gyr, City of Little Rock	1961		Plaster, Bronze edition of eight cast c.1976-78	358.0 x 145.0 x 123.0 cm with base	LH 482a	Q19760134	
	Reclining Figure: Bunched	Plaster - The Henry Moore Foundation; Bronze - McNay Art Museum, Tate Britain	1961		Bronze on stone base, edition of ten cast c.1961-63	13.0 x 16.6 x 9.3 cm	LH 489		Maquette for LH 489a.
	Working Model for Stone Memorial	Plaster - The Henry Moore Foundation; Bronze - Sara Hilden Art Museum, Honolulu Museum of Art, Westphalian State Museum of Art and Cultural History, The Henry Moore Foundation	1961		Plaster, Bronze edition of eleven cast 1971-76	55.5 x 60.0 x 61.0 cm	LH 491a		
	Stone Memorial	National Gallery of Art	1961		Travertine marble	180.0 cm long	LH 491b		
More images	Three Piece Reclining Figure No. 1	Plaster - Art Gallery of Ontario, Bronze - Tate, Montreal Museum of Fine Arts, Meadows Museum, Los Angeles County Museum of Art, Baltimore Museum of Art, Rochester Institute of Technology, Yorkshire Sculpture Park	1962		Plaster, Bronze edition of eight	169.3 x 280.1 x 136.6 cm	LH 500	Q19760185	
	Large Slow Form	Plaster- unknown; Bronze - Museo Rufino Tamayo, Mexico City, Tate, Hakone Open-Air Museum, The Henry Moore Foundation	1962		Plaster, Bronze edition of eleven cast 1968	48.0 x 84.4 x 46.0 cm	LH 502a		
	Large Torso, Arch	Plaster - unknown; Bronze - MoMA New York, Lynden Sculpture Garden, Cantor Arts Center, Nelson Atkins Museum of Art	1963		Plaster, Bronze edition of eight cast 1962-69	199.5 cm high	LH 503		
	Maquette for Large Torso: Arch	Plaster - The Henry Moore Foundation; Bronze - Art Gallery of Ontario, Nasher Sculpture Center, Hiroshima City Museum of Contemporary Art	1962		Plaster, Bronze edition of eleven cast 1971	11.2 x 8.2 x 7.5 cm high	LH 503a		
More images	Large Arch	Fibreglass- The Henry Moore Foundation, Bronze - Cleo Rogers Memorial Library, Hiroshima City Museum of Contemporary Art, Henie Onstad Kunstsenter, The Henry Moore Foundation	1963		Bronze edition of four cast 1969, Fiberglass 1969, Polystyrene 1969	610.0 x 360.0 x 340.0 cm high	LH 503b	Q16970017	
	Divided Head	Plaster - unknown; Bronze - The Henry Moore Foundation	1963		Plaster, Bronze edition of ten	34.8 x 18.0 x 18.6 cm	LH 506		
More images	Helmet Head No.4: Interior-Exterior	Plaster - The Henry Moore Foundation; Bronze - Tate Britain, The Henry Moore Foundation	1963		Plaster, Bronze edition of eight cast 1963-70	47.6 cm high	LH 508		
More images	Three-Piece Reclining Figure No. 2: Bridge Prop	Plaster - Art Gallery of Ontario; Bronze - Tate Britain, Leeds Art Gallery, Hirshhorn Museum and Sculpture Garden, Kreeger Museum, Brown University, The Henry Moore Foundation on loan from a private collection	1963		Plaster, Bronze edition of seven cast 1963-66	104.9 x 241.7 x 110.3 cm	LH 513	Q7797233	
More images	Working Model for Locking Piece	Plaster - Art Gallery of Ontario; Bronze -Ulster Museum, Munson-Williams-Proctor Arts Institute, National Museum of Art of Romania, Donald M. Kendall Sculpture Gardens, Lehmbruck Museum, The Henry Moore Foundation; Fibreglass - The Henry Moore Foundation	1962		Plaster, Bronze edition of ten, fibreglass	104.0 x 88.0 x 85.0 cm with base	LH 514		
More images	Locking Piece	Bronze - Tate Britain, Kunstmuseum Den Haag, The Henry Moore Foundation; Fibreglass - Homerton College, The Henry Moore Foundation	1963		Bronze edition of four, Fibreglass edition of two cast 1971	292.0 cm high	LH 515	Q19760140	
More images	Knife Edge Two Piece	College Green, London, Kykuit, Queen Elizabeth Park, British Columbia	1962		Bronze edition of four cast 1962-65	275.0 x 418.0 x 172.5 cm	LH 516	Q6422110	
More images	Two Piece Reclining Figure No. 5	Plaster - The Henry Moore Foundation; Bronze - Kenwood House on loan from Tate, Louisiana Museum of Modern Art, Kunsthalle Recklinghausen	1963		Plaster, Bronze edition of four cast 1963-67	372 cm long	LH 517	Q19760201	
More images	Working Model for Reclining Figure (Lincoln Center)	Plaster - Art Gallery of Ontario; Bronze - Charing Cross Hospital on loan from Tate, Massachusetts Institute of Technology	1963-65		Plaster, Bronze edition of two	235.0 x 372.3 x 165.2 cm	LH 518	Q19759593	
More images	Reclining Figure (Lincoln Center)	Lincoln Center	1963-65		Bronze	550.0 x 855.0 cm	LH 519	Q19759280	
	Moon Head	Plaster - Art Gallery of Ontario; Bronze - Tate Liverpool	1964		Plaster, Bronze edition of ten	57.0 cm high	LH 521		
More images	Moon Head	The Henry Moore Foundation (2 casts)	1964		Porcelain edition of eight cast 1968-71	30.5 cm high	LH 522		
	Thin Head	Plaster - The Henry Moore Foundation; Bronze - Dallas Museum of Art	1963		Plaster, Bronze edition of ten	11.4 x 8.3 x 3.8 cm	LH 523		
	Two Forms	Unknown	1964		White marble	46.0 cm long	LH 529		
	Oval Sculpture	Unknown	1964		White marble	44.0 cm high	LH 530		
	Torso	Private collection	1964		White marble	78.7 cm high	LH 554		
	Maquette for Atom Piece	Plaster - Art Gallery of Ontario, The Henry Moore Foundation; Bronze - National Gallery of Art, The Henry Moore Foundation	1964		Plaster edition of two, Bronze edition of thirteen cast 1970	16.2 x 13.3 x 13.3 cm	LH 524	Q19759136	
More images	Atom Piece (Working Model for Nuclear Energy)	Plaster - Art Gallery of Ontario; Bronze - Tate Britain, Hiroshima City Museum of Contemporary Art, Didrichsen Art Museum, Hakone Open-Air Museum, Kykuit	1964-65		Plaster, Bronze edition of seven	118.2 x 91.5 x 91.5 cm	LH 525		

== 1965 to 1969 ==
Image	Title / subject	Location and coordinates	Date	Type	Material	Dimensions	Designation	Wikidata	Notes
More images	Nuclear Energy	Chicago Pile-1 at the University of Chicago	1966		Bronze	366 cm high	LH 526	Q4355111	
	Working Model for Sundial	St Stephen Walbrook, The Henry Moore Foundation	1965		Bronze edition of 21	51.5 cm high x 49.5 cm diameter	LH 527		
More images	Man Enters the Cosmos	Adler Planetarium, Würth Haus Rorschach	1966		Bronze edition of two, cast 1966 and 1979	366.0 cm high	LH 528	Q6746177	
More images	Three Way Piece No.1: Points	Plaster- The Henry Moore Foundation; Bronze - Columbia University, Des Moines Art Center, Fairmount Park Philadelphia, Nelson-Atkins Museum of Art	1965		Plaster with surface colour, Bronze edition of four	198.1 x 208.3 x 236.2 cm	LH 533	Q19760191	
More images	Three Way Piece No.2: Archer	Plaster - unknown; Bronze - Nathan Phillips Square Toronto, Alte Nationalgalerie Berlin	1965		Plaster, Bronze edition of two	325.0 x 224.0 x 365.0 cm	LH 535	Q19760697	
	Reclining Interior Oval	Unknown	1965-68		Red travertine marble	100.0 x 213.0 cm long	LH 538		
	Two Three-Quarter Figures on Base	Plasters - The Henry Moore Foundation	1965		Plaster edition of two, Bronze edition of ten	19.4 cm high	LH 539a		
	Two Piece Sculpture No.7: Pipe	Plaster - Art Gallery of Ontario; Bronze - Tate, The Whitworth	1967		Plaster, Bronze edition of ten	94.0 cm long	LH 543		
	Helmet Head No.5	Plaster - unknown; Bronze - Bolton Museum	1966		Plaster, Bronze edition of two	42.0 x 33.0 x 25.0 cm	LH 544		
	Owl	Plaster & two bronze casts - The Henry Moore Foundation	1966		Plaster, Bronze edition of six	18.5 x 13.0 x 13.0 cm	LH 546		
	Three Rings	Baltimore Museum of Art	1966		Rosa aurora marble	100.0 cm long	LH 548		
	Three Way Ring	The Henry Moore Foundation (2 casts)	1966		Porcelain edition of seven	26.5 x 37.0 x 34.0 cm	LH 550		
	Two Forms	Private collection	1966		Red travertine marble	93.0 x 114.5 cm long	LH 555		
	Upright Form: Knife Edge	Tate	1966		Rosa aurora marble	66.0 x 58.5 x 41.0 cm	LH 551		
More images	Large Two Forms (in German)	Bronze - Bundeskanzleramt, Bonn, Art Gallery of Ontario, Neuberger Museum of Art, The Henry Moore Foundation	1969		Bronze edition of five, fibreglass, polystyrene	360.0 x 610.0 x 435.0 cm	LH 556	Q19760137	
	Reclining Figure	Norton Simon Museum	1966		White marble	114.0 cm long	LH 557		
	Double Oval	Private collection	1966		Rosa aurora marble	97.0 cm long	LH 559		
More images	Double Oval	Plaster - Unknown; Bronze - Donald M. Kendall Sculpture Gardens, Exchange Square (Hong Kong), The Henry Moore Foundation	1966		Plaster, Bronze edition of three	380.0 x 635.0 x 405.0 cm	LH 560	Q19760111	
	Two Nuns	Würth Collection	1968		White marble	151.0 cm high	LH 562		
	Standing Girl: Bonnet and Muff	Plaster and bronze - Unknown	1966		Plaster, Bronze edition of eight cast 1968	23.0 cm high	LH 563		
	Reclining Figure: Cloak	Plaster - The Henry Moore Foundation; Bronze - Detroit Institute of Arts, The Henry Moore Foundation	1967		Plaster, Bronze edition of ten	21.0 x 45.5 x 21.0 cm	LH 565		
	Standing Figure: Shell Skirt	Plaster and bronze - Unknown / Private collection	1966		Plaster, Bronze edition of ten cast 1967	18.0 cm high	LH 566		
	Doll Head	Plaster - Unkown; Bronze - The Henry Moore Foundation	1967		Plaster, Bronze edition of ten cast 1967-69	11.7 x 9.5 x 7.7 cm	LH 567		
	Torso	Bronze - Nelson-Atkins Museum of Art	1967		Plaster, Bronze edition of eight	107.0 cm high	LH 569		
	Working Model for Divided Oval: Butterfly	Plaster - The Henry Moore Foundation (2 casts); Bronze - Frederik Meijer Gardens & Sculpture Park, The Henry Moore Foundation	1967		Plaster edition of two, Bronze edition of seven cast 1982	91.4 cm long	LH 571a		
More images	Large Divided Oval: Butterfly	Tiergarten, Berlin	1983		Bronze	450.0 cm high	LH 571b	Q19759066	
	Mother and Child	The Henry Moore Foundation	1967		Rosa aurora marble	95.0 x 130.3 x 64.2 cm	LH 573		
More images	Sculpture with Hole and Light	Kröller-Müller Museum	1967		Red travertine	127.0 cm long	LH 575		
More images	Two-Piece Reclining Figure No. 9	Bronze - Tate, Lynden Sculpture Garden, Norton Simon Museum, Nelson-Atkins Museum of Art, National Library of Australia, de Young Museum	1968		Plaster, Bronze edition of eight	143.5 x 243.8 x 134.9 cm	LH 576	Q7858673	
More images	Large Totem Head	Bronze - City of Nuremberg, Yorkshire Sculpture Park on loan from Tate, Montreal Museum of Fine Arts, Nelson Atkins Museum of Art, The Henry Moore Foundation	1968		Plaster, Bronze edition of nine	246.0 x 133.0 x 122.0 cm	LH 577	Q19760136	
	Maquette for Three Piece No.3: Vertebrae	Montreal Museum of Fine Arts	1968		Bronze edition of ten	19.0 cm long	LH 578		
More images	Working Model for Three Piece No.3: Vertebrae	Bronze - Tate, Hirshhorn Museum and Sculpture Garden, Memorial Art Gallery, Art Gallery of Ontario	1968		Plaster, Bronze edition of nine	236.0 cm long	LH 579	Q7797232	
More images	Three Piece Sculpture: Vertebrae	Bronze - Landesbausparkasse, Münster, Seattle Art Museum, Israel Museum, The Henry Moore Foundation	1969		Plaster, Bronze edition of four	280.0 x 710.0 x 355.0 cm	LH 580	Q19760188	
	Two Piece Sculpture No.10: Interlocking	Bronze - Kunsthalle Bielefeld, National Museum of Norway, National Gallery Prague, The Henry Moore Foundation	1968		Plaster, Bronze edition of eight	54.0 x 91.0 x 53.2 cm	LH 581		
	Two Piece Carving: Interlocking	Unknown	1968		White marble	71.1 cm long	LH 583		
More images	Working Model for Spindle Piece	Plaster - The Henry Moore Foundation; Bronze - Calouste Gulbenkian Foundation, Hakone Open-Air Museum, The Henry Moore Foundation	1967		Plaster with surface colour, Bronze edition of eleven cast 1968-69	84.0 cm high	LH 592		
More images	Large Spindle Piece	Plaster - The Henry Moore Foundation; Bronze - Yorkshire Sculpture Park, Kenyon College, North Carolina Museum of Art, City of Houston, Miyagi Museum of Art	1968		Plaster, Bronze edition of seven cast c.1974	335.0 x 310.0 x 235.0 cm	LH 593	Q19760133	
More images	Oval with Points	Bronze - Columbia Museum of Art, Kunsthalle Bielefeld, Municipality of Jeddah, Princeton University, Exchange Square in Hong Kong, The Henry Moore Foundation	1968-70		Plaster, Bronze edition of seven	327.0 cm high	LH 596	Q19760151	
	Maquette for Square Form with Cut	Plaster - Art Gallery of Ontario; Bronze - Metropolitan Museum of Art, The Henry Moore Foundation	1969		Plaster, Bronze edition of ten	16.5 cm high	LH 597		
	Square Form with Cut	Marble - Foundation Bartolome March; Concrete - The Henry Moore Foundation	1969		Black marble, concrete, fibreglass	140.0 cm long	LH 598		
	Two Piece Points: Skull	Fiberglass - Art Gallery of Ontario, The Henry Moore Foundation (3 casts)	1969		Plaster, Fiberglass edition of four	76.2 x 58.0 x 58.0 cm	LH 600		
	Pointed Torso	Plaster - unknown; Bronze - Royal College of Art, MoMA New York, Johannesburg Art Gallery, The Henry Moore Foundation	1969		Plaster, Bronze edition of thirteen	66.0 cm high	LH 601		
	Architectural Project	Plaster - The Henry Moore Foundation; Bronze - Nelson-Atkins Museum of Art, Johannesburg Art Gallery, The Henry Moore Foundation	1969		Plaster, Bronze edition of thirteen	64.0 cm long	LH 602		
More images	Reclining Connected Forms	Bronze - Trinity College, Dublin, Nelson-Atkins Museum of Art, Storm King Art Center, University of Adelaide, The Henry Moore Foundation	1969		Plaster, Bronze edition of ten	93.0 x 224.0 x 132.5 cm	LH 612	Q19760153	
	Two Forms	Manchester Art Gallery	1969		Carrara marble	57.5 x 100.0 x 58.3 cm	LH 614		
More images	Reclining Figure: Bunched	Marble - Private collection, Bronze - Snape Maltings on loan from The Henry Moore Foundation	1969		Travertine marble, Bronze edition of two cast 1985	110.0 x 192.0 x 102.0 cm	LH 489a		

== 1970 to 1974 ==
Image	Title / subject	Location and coordinates	Date	Type	Material	Dimensions	Designation	Wikidata	Notes
	Three Forms Vertebrae	Dallas City Hall	1978		Bronze	1219.0 cm long	LH 580a		
	Interlocking Two Piece Sculpture	Roche, Basel	1970		White marble	315.0 cm long	LH 584		
More images	Large Square Form with Cut (in Italian)	Piazza San Marco, Prato	1971		Rio Serra marble	545.0 cm high	LH 599	Q3748112	
More images	Two-Piece Reclining Figure: Points	Hofgarten, Düsseldorf, Hirshhorn Museum and Sculpture Garden, Hakone Open-Air Museum, Bayerische Staatsgemäldesammlungen, Munich, The Henry Moore Foundation	1970		Bronze edition of eight	230.0 x 365.5 x 183.0 cm with base	LH 606	Q19760151	
More images	Reclining Figure	Bronze - Tel Aviv Museum, Hakone Open-Air Museum, Louisiana Museum of Modern Art, Columbia University	1970		Plaster, Bronze edition of seven	343.0 cm long	LH 608	Q7302581	
More images	Reclining Figure: Arch Leg	Belém Cultural Center, Hakone Open-Air Museum, San Diego Museum of Art, Musée d'Art et d'Histoire (Geneva), The Henry Moore Foundation	1970		Bronze edition of seven	260.5 x 465.0 x 206.0 cm with base	LH 610	Q19760163	
More images	Large Reclining Connected Forms	Aria resort, Las Vegas	1974		Roman travertine	202.0 x 530.0 x 300.0 cm	LH 613		
	Large Animal Form	Unknown	1970		Travertine marble	274.0 cm long	LH 617		
	Arch Form	Private collection	1970		Serpentine	210.0 cm long	LH 618		
	Oblong Composition	Staatliche Kunsthalle Karlsruhe	1970		Red travertine	120.0 cm long	LH 620		
	Standing Figure	The Henry Moore Foundation	1971-72		White Carrara marble	221.0 x 60.0 x 60.0 cm	LH 290b		
	Fledglings	Plaster and bronze - The Henry Moore Foundation	1973		Plaster, Bronze edition of ten	7.0 x 16.0 x 8.0 cm	LH 622		
More images	Bird Form I	The Henry Moore Foundation	1973		Black serpentine	36.0 x 32.0 x 28.5 cm	LH 623		
More images	Bird Form II	The Henry Moore Foundation	1973		Black marble	38.9 x 36.5 x 31.7 cm	LH 624		
More images	Sheep Piece	Seefeld (Zürich), Donald M. Kendall Sculpture Gardens, The Henry Moore Foundation	1972		Bronze edition of four	570.0 cm high	LH 627		
More images	Large Four Piece Reclining Figure	Louise M. Davies Symphony Hall, Yamanashi Prefectural Art Museum, Fogg Art Museum	1973		Bronze edition of eight	402.0 cm long	LH 629	Q17016283	
More images	Circular Altar	St Stephen Walbrook	1972		Travertine	102.0 cm long	LH 630		
	Three Way Piece Carving	Unknown	1972		Carrara marble	48.0 cm long	LH 631		
	Double Tongue Form	Private collection	1972		Carrara marble	53.0 x 76.0 x 58.5 cm	LH 632		
	Head	Neue Pinakothek	1972		Travertine	45.5 x 22.5 x 33.0 cm	LH 633		
More images	Hill Arches	Bronze - Karlskirche, National Gallery of Australia, The Henry Moore Foundation	1973		Plaster, Bronze edition of four	550.0 cm long	LH 636	Q19760126	
	Serpent	Plaster - The Henry Moore Foundation; Bronze - McNay Art Museum, The Henry Moore Foundation	1973		Plaster, Bronze edition of ten	24.0 cm long	LH 637		
	Column	Plaster and bronze - The Henry Moore Foundation	1973		Plaster, Bronze edition of seven	17.0 cm high	LH 639		
More images	Goslar Warrior	Plaster -unknown; Bronze - City of Goslar, Santa Cruz de Tenerife, The Henry Moore Foundation	1974		Plaster, Bronze edition of eight	249.0 cm long	LH 641	Q19729666	
	Reclining Figure: Bone	Plaster & bronze - The Henry Moore Foundation	1973		Plaster, Bronze edition of ten	12.0 x 28.3 x 10.0 cm	LH 642		
	Carving: Points	Albertinum, Dresden	1974		Rosa aurora marble	36.3 x 86.3 x 34.0 cm	LH 644		

== 1975 to 1979 ==
Image	Title / subject	Location and coordinates	Date	Type	Material	Dimensions	Designation	Wikidata	Notes
	Reclining Figure: Bone	The Henry Moore Foundation	1975		Travertine marble	63.1 x 157.5 x 61.0 cm	LH 643		
More images	Reclining Mother and Child	Plaster - The Henry Moore Foundation; Bronze - Ohara Museum of Art, New Orleans Museum of Art, The Henry Moore Foundation	1976		Plaster, Bronze edition of eight	245.0 x 125.0 x 85.0 cm	LH 649		
	Broken Figure	The Henry Moore Foundation	1975		Black marble	46.0 x 107.5 x 51.2 cm	LH 663		
	Helmet Head No.6	Plaster - The Henry Moore Foundation; Bronze - Bulgarian Government Collection, The Henry Moore Foundation	1975		Plaster, Bronze edition of ten	44.0 x 49.0 x 55.0 cm with base	LH 651		
More images	Three Piece Reclining Figure: Draped	Plaster - Unknown; Bronze - City of Gävle, MIT, Tehran Museum of Contemporary Art, Louisiana Museum of Modern Art, The Henry Moore Foundation	1975		Plaster, Bronze edition of eight	265.0 x 474.0 x 264.5 cm	LH 655	Q19760187	
	Reclining Figure: Holes	Private collection	1976-78		Elm wood	123.0 x 222.0 x 106.0 cm	LH 657		
	Reclining Mother and Child: Shell Skirt	Plaster - The Henry Moore Foundation; Bronze- Art Gallery of Ontario, The Henry Moore Foundation	1975		Plaster, Bronze edition of ten	20.0 cm long	LH 665		
	Two Piece Reclining Figure: Holes	Plaster - The Henry Moore Foundation; Bronze - Tehran Museum of Contemporary Art, The Henry Moore Foundation	1975		Plaster, Bronze edition of ten	22.0 cm long	LH 666		
	Two Piece Reclining Figure: Bust	Plasters & bronze - The Henry Moore Foundation	1975		Plaster edition of two, Bronze edition of ten	19.0 cm long	LH 668		
	Two Forms	Private collection	1975		Roman travertine marble	88.0 cm long	LH 670		
	Girl: Bust	Private collection	1975		Roman travertine marble	62.2 x 36.8 x 46.9 cm	LH 671		
More images	Reclining Figure: Angles	Bronze - Art Gallery of New South Wales, Nasher Sculpture Center, Hakone Open-Air Museum, Speed Art Museum, The Henry Moore Foundation	1979		Plaster, Bronze edition of ten	122.6 x 229.2 x 156.8 cm	LH 675	Q19760162	
	Seated Mother and Child	Plaster & bronze - The Henry Moore Foundation	1975		Plaster, Bronze edition of ten	22.9 cm long	LH 679		
	Girl and Dwarf	Plaster & bronze - The Henry Moore Foundation	1975		Plaster, Bronze edition of ten	15.5 cm high	LH 680		
	Standing Mother and Child	Plaster & bronze - The Henry Moore Foundation	1975		Plaster, Bronze edition of ten	20.6 x 7.0 x 3.6 cm	LH 683		
	Mother and Child: Gothic	Plaster & bronze - The Henry Moore Foundation	1975		Plaster, Bronze edition of ten	19.0 x 10.5 x 10.5 cm	LH 684		
	Two Piece Reclining Figure: Armless	Plaster - The Henry Moore Foundation; Bronze - Art Gallery of Ontario	1975		Plaster, Bronze edition of ten	61.0 cm long	LH 685		
	Reclining Figure: Curved	Private collection	1977		Black marble	144.0 cm long	LH 689		
	Mother and Child: Pisano	Bronze - Nelson-Atkins Museum of Art	1976		Plaster, Bronze edition of ten	14.0 cm high	LH 696		
	Maquette for Mother and Child: Arms	Plaster and Bronze- The Henry Moore Foundation;	1976		Plaster with surface colour, Bronze edition of eleven	13.1 x 20.3 x 13.5 cm	LH 697		
	Mother and Child: Arms	Plaster - Art Gallery of Ontario; Bronze - Fukushima Prefectural Museum of Art, National Gallery of Victoria, The Henry Moore Foundation	1976-80		Plaster, Bronze edition of ten	65.0 x 80.0 x 47.0 cm with base	LH 698		
	Twin Heads	Plaster & Bronze - The Henry Moore Foundation	1976		Plaster edition of two, Bronze edition of ten	16.0 cm long	LH 700		
	Working Model for Draped Reclining Figure	Plaster - The Henry Moore Foundation; Bronze - Castleford Civic Centre, Rozelle House Galleries, University Museum (University of Tokyo), The Henry Moore Foundation	1976-79		Plaster, Bronze edition of ten	99.4 cm long	LH 705	Q19759578	
	Draped Reclining Figure	The Henry Moore Foundation;	1978		Travertine marble	115.5 x 200.3 x 120.0 cm	LH 706		
	Maquette for Reclining Figure No. 7	Plaster - The Henry Moore Foundation (two casts); Bronze - Didrichsen Art Museum, The Henry Moore Foundation	1978		Plaster edition of two, Bronze edition of ten	20.0 cm long	LH 751		Maquette for LH 752
More images	Reclining Figure: Hand	Bronze - Headquarters of the United Nations, Ulrich Museum, The Henry Moore Foundation	1979		Plaster, Bronze edition of ten	221.0 cm long	LH 709	Q19760165	
	Mother and Child: Egg Form	The Henry Moore Foundation	1977		White marble	200.0 x 70.0 x 70.0 cm	LH 717		
	Egg Form: Pebbles	Unknown	1977		White crystalline marble	100.0 cm long	LH 719		
	Reclining Figure: Bone Skirt	Unknown	1978		Roman travertine	87.0 x 173.5 x 74.0 cm	LH 724		
	Three Bathers - After Cézanne	Plaster and Bronze - The Henry Moore Foundation;	1978		Plaster, Bronze edition of eight	30.5 cm long	LH 741		
More images	Mother and Child	The Henry Moore Foundation	1978		Stalactite	84.0 x 89.0 x 48.0 cm	LH 754		
More images	Working Model for Two Piece Reclining Figure: Cut	Bronze - Itochu Building, Osaka, Nelson-Atkins Museum of Art, Yale Center for British Art, The Henry Moore Foundation	1979		Plaster edition of two, Bronze edition of ten	78.2 x 94.9 x 45.5 cm	LH 757	Q19729771	
More images	Upright Motive No. 9	Plaster - The henry Moore Foundation; Bronze - Yorkshire Sculpture Park, Nelson-Atkins Museum of Art, Hofstra University, Northwestern Mutual Life Insurance in Honolulu, The Henry Moore Foundation	1979		Plaster, Bronze edition of seven	355.5 x 92.0 x 92.0 cm	LH 586a	Q19760209	
	Thin Reclining Figure	The Henry Moore Foundation;	1979-80		White marble	83.0 x 210.0 x 95.0 cm	LH 734		

== 1980 to 1986 ==
Image	Title / subject	Location and coordinates	Date	Type	Material	Dimensions	Designation	Wikidata	Notes
More images	The Arch	Kensington Gardens, London	1980		Travertine marble	580.0 x 455.0 x 355.0 cm	LH 503c	Q19691888	
	Reclining Figure No. 7	Bronze - National Gallery of Victoria, The Henry Moore Foundation	1980		Plaster, Bronze edition of ten	91.4 cm long	LH 752		
	Girl with Crossed Arms	The Henry Moore Foundation	1980		Travertine marble	72.4 cm high	LH 776		
	Three-Quarter Figure: Lines	Plaster & bronze - The Henry Moore Foundation	1980		Plaster, Bronze edition of ten	83.0 x 31.0 x 25.5 cm	LH 797		
	Three Upright Motives (Standing Figures)	Plaster - The Henry Moore Foundation; Bronze - Hiroshima City Museum of Contemporary Art, The Henry Moore Foundation	1980		Plaster dated 1977, Bronze edition of eight	20.0 cm high	LH 715		
	Two Standing Figures	The Henry Moore Foundation;	1981		Travertine marble	246.5 x 201.0 x 125.0 cm	LH 715a		
	Single Standing Figure	St Albans Cathedral on loan from The Henry Moore Foundation;	1981		Travertine marble	246.5 cm high	LH 715b		
	Large Spindle Piece	Hotel Intercontinental, Miami	1981		Travertine	450.0 cm high	LH 593a		
More images	Reclining Figure	Bronze - Fondation Pierre Gianadda, Caracas Museum of Contemporary Art, The Henry Moore Foundation	1982		Plaster, Bronze edition of ten	118.0 x 235.5 x 110.0 cm with base	LH 677a		
More images	Two Piece Reclining Figure: Cut	Bronze - Yorkshire Sculpture Park, City of Strasbourg, Hakone Open-Air Museum, The Henry Moore Foundation	1981		Plaster, Bronze cast 1979-81	399.0 x 470.0 x 225.0 cm	LH 758	Q19760202	
More images	Reclining Woman: Elbow	Plaster - Unknown; Bronze - Leeds Art Gallery, Segerstrom Center for the Arts	1981		Plaster, Bronze edition of ten	221 cm	LH 810	Q19760167	
More images	Figure in a Shelter	Bronze - City of Vaduz, The Henry Moore Foundation	1983		Plaster, Bronze edition of seven	168.0 x 228.5 x 228.5 cm	LH 652a	Q19760122	
More images	Mother and Child: Hood	St Paul's Cathedral on loan from The Henry Moore Foundation	1983		Travertine marble	183.0 cm high	LH 851		
	Maquette for Reclining Figure: Circle	Plaster & bronze - The Henry Moore Foundation	1983		Plaster, Bronze edition of ten	7.3 x 15.4 x 4.5 cm	LH 902		
More images	Large Reclining Figure	Fibreglass - The Henry Moore Foundation, Bronze - Oversea-Chinese Banking, Singapore, Fitzwilliam Museum on loan from The Henry Moore Foundation	1984		Fiberglass, Bronze edition of two, Polystyrene - destroyed	420.0 x 940.0 x 290.0 cm	LH 192b	Q19760131	
More images	Two Three-Quarter Figures on Base	Plaster - The Henry Moore Foundation; Bronze - Nelson-Atkins Museum, The Henry Moore Foundation	1984		Plaster, Bronze edition of ten	101.0 x 54.5 x 36.6 cm	LH 539b		
	Horse	Bronze - The Henry Moore Foundation;	1984		Plaster, Bronze edition of ten;	57.6 x 68.5 x 38.1 cm with base	LH 740a		
More images	Mother and Child: Block Seat	Bronze - Hakone Open-Air Museum, Nagashima Museum, Ville de Luxembourg, The Henry Moore Foundation	1984		Plaster, Bronze edition of ten	238.0 x 111.5 x 134.8 cm	LH 838	Q19760148	
More images	Bronze Form	Bronze - Wellington Botanic Garden, Frederik Meijer Gardens & Sculpture Park, A.P. Moller-Maersk Group Copenhagen, J Paul Getty Museum, Kawamura Memorial DIC Museum of Art	1985		Plaster, Bronze edition of seven	442.0 x 240.0 x 76.0 cm	LH 652d	Q19759121	
More images	Large Figure in a Shelter	City of Guernica, The Henry Moore Foundation	1986		Bronze edition of two	497.0 x 640.0 x 575.0 cm	LH 652c	Q19760129	
