= Goslar Warrior 1973–1974 =

Sculpture series by Henry Moore

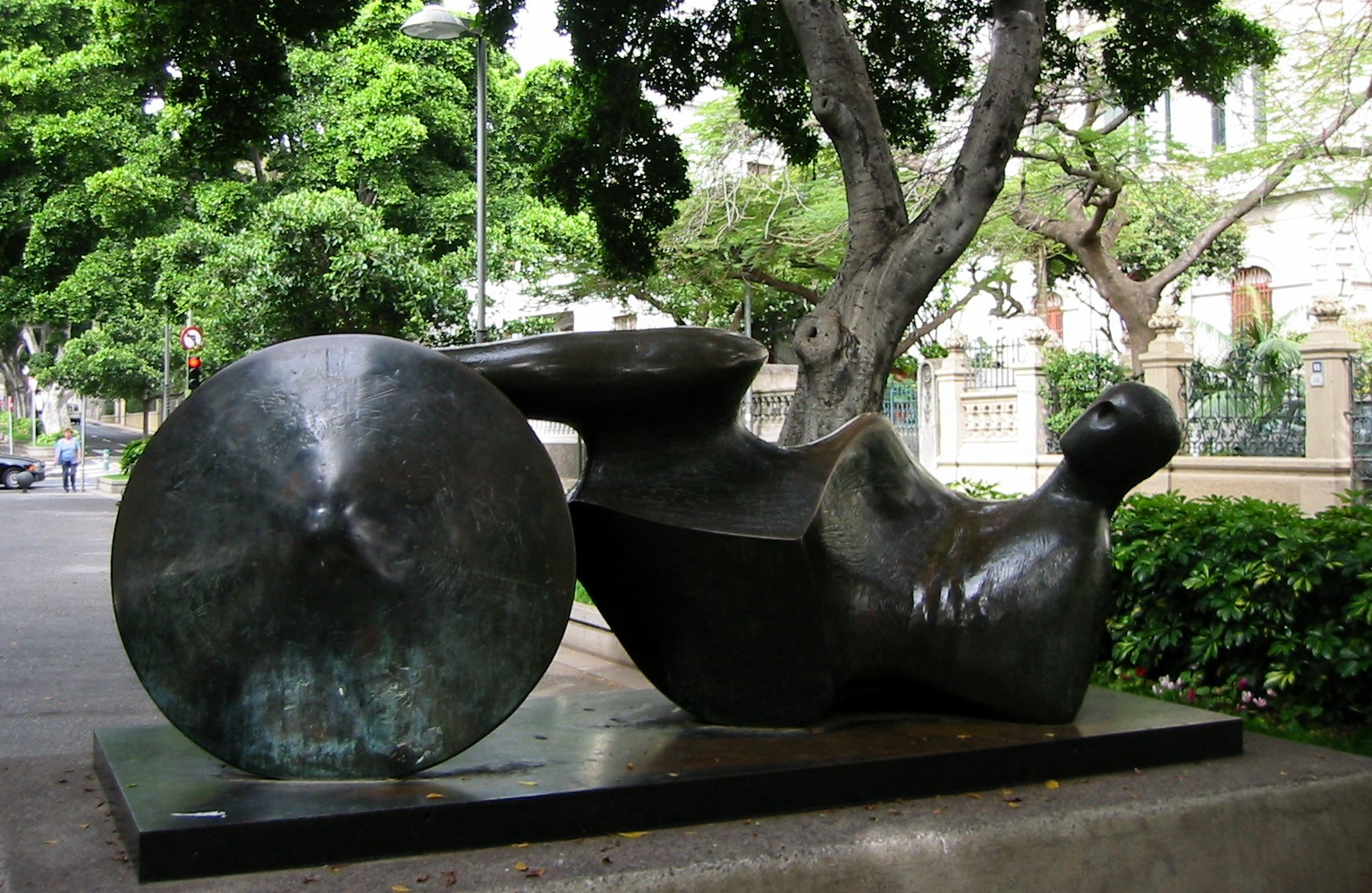
- The Santa Cruz cast of the sculpture in April 2005
- Artist: Henry Moore
- Year: 1973 to 1974
- Catalogue: LH 641
- Medium: Bronze
- Dimensions: 3 m (9.8 ft)

Goslar Warrior 1973–1974 is a bronze sculpture by Henry Moore, catalogued as LH 641. It is approximately 3m long.

== Casts ==
Seven casts were made. Two of the casts are publicly exhibited; one in the gardens of the Imperial Palace of Goslar in Goslar, Germany, and another in Santa Cruz, Tenerife.

The seventh and final cast of the Goslar Warrior sold at auction at Christies in London in February 2011 for £1.8 million.

== See also ==
- List of sculptures by Henry Moore
