= Three Way Piece No.2: Archer =

Sculpture by Henry Moore

Coordinates: 43.65283°N 79.3840°W

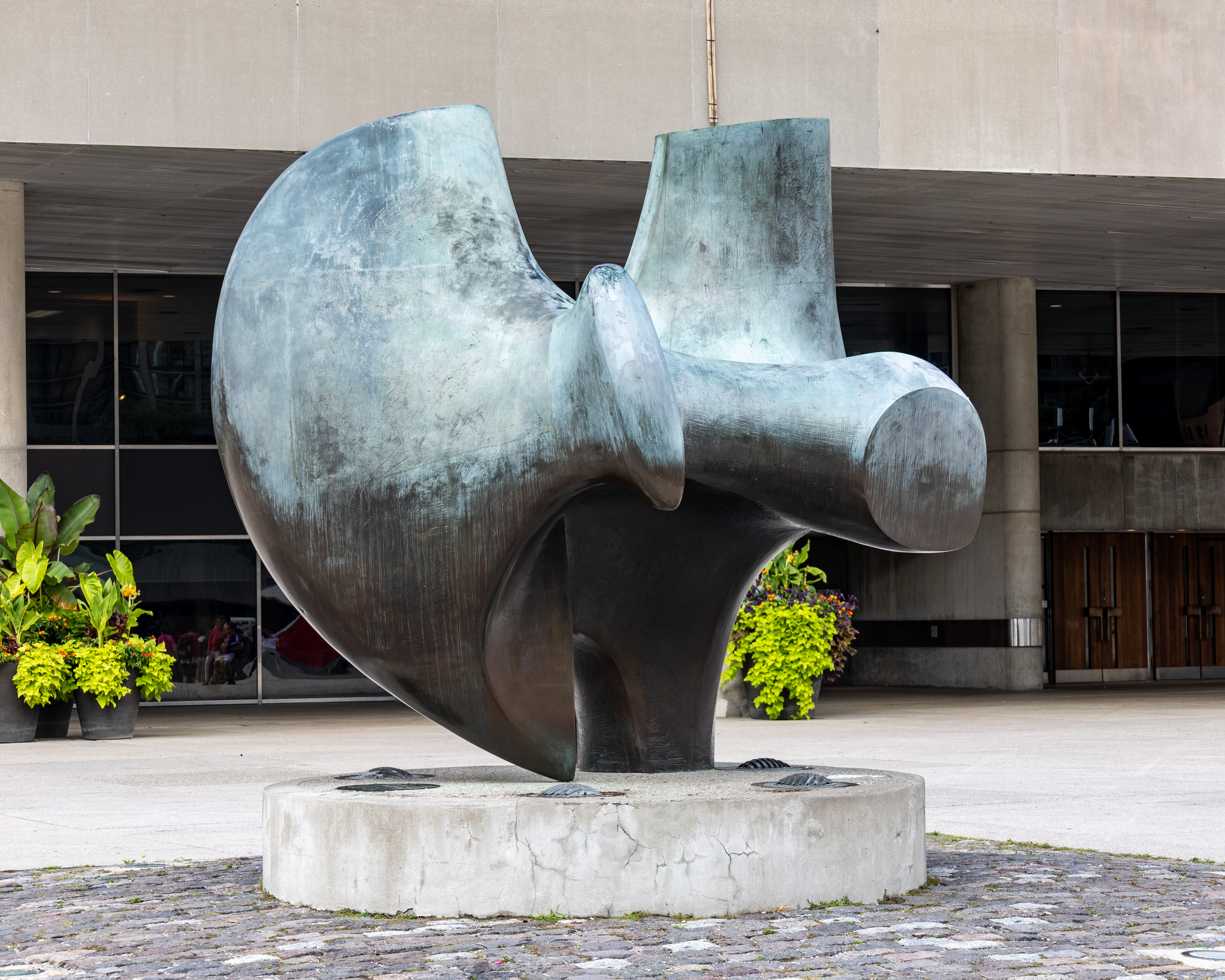
- Cast 1 in Toronto's Nathan Phillips Square
- Artist: Henry Moore
- Year: 1966
- Catalogue: LH 535
- Medium: Bronze sculpture
- Dimensions: 325 cm × 340 cm (128 in × 130 in)
- Location: Toronto, Canada; Berlin, Germany
- Owner: Municipal government of Toronto; National Gallery (Berlin)

Three Way Piece No.2: Archer is a large sculpture by the British artist Henry Moore. Two casts exist: cast 1 in Toronto, cast 2 is owned by the National Gallery, Berlin. The work is 340 cm long and 325 cm high. A plaster cast of the work was also made, and was shown in June 1965 at the Queen's Theatre in London as part of a memorial service to T.S. Eliot.

== History ==
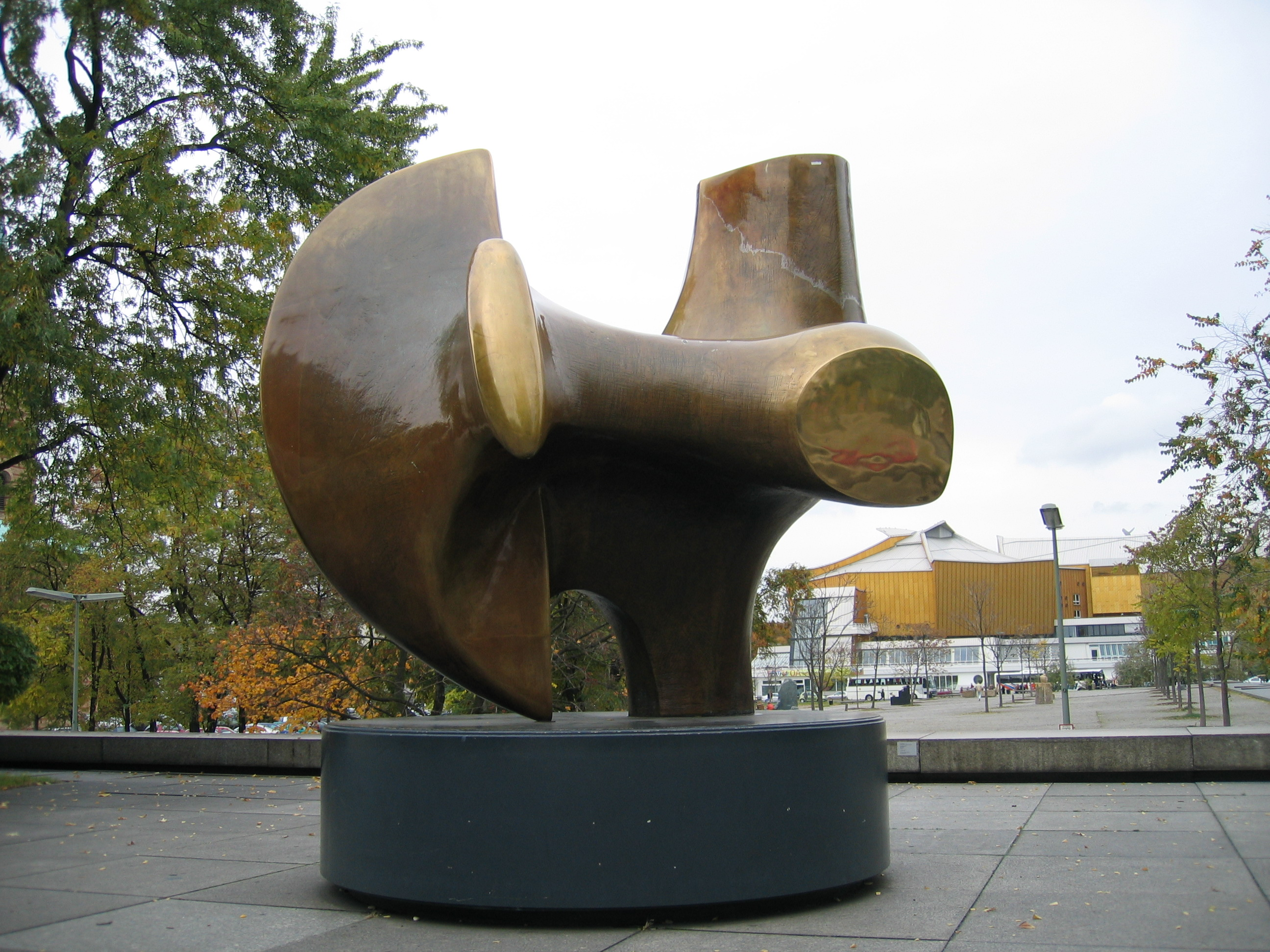
Cast 2 of the sculpture outside the National Gallery in Berlin

The Finnish architect Viljo Revell asked Moore to create a sculpture in keeping with the flowing lines of his new Toronto City Hall on Nathan Phillips Square. The sculpture, although controversial when purchased in 1966 is now considered part of Toronto's civic heritage. The work was originally to cost $120,000; Moore eventually sold the bronze to Toronto for $100,000, on the condition that he could make a second cast for the National Gallery in Berlin. The first bronze cast was exhibited for the first time in Arnhem, The Netherlands, in 1966; it was unveiled in Toronto on October 26 that year.

== Smaller models ==
The work had begun life in 1964 as a plaster maquette, probably based on a stone that Moore had collected. Many of Moore's maquettes for larger works were cast in bronze, but the maquette for the Archer never was. A medium-sized version of the sculpture, Working Model for Three Way Piece No.2: Archer, was cast in bronze in edition of seven, along with an artist's cast. The Working Model is 78 cm long and 79 cm high. The artist's cast is now owned by the Tate, which was presented the work by Moore in 1978. The bronze Working Model was first exhibited at the Marlborough Galleria d'Arte in Rome in 1965.

A unique marble version of the Archer, about the same size as the Working Model (78 cm x 75 cm) was carved by Moore in 1965, and is owned by the Didrichsen Art Museum in Helsinki, which acquired the work in 1967.

== See also ==
- List of sculptures by Henry Moore
