= Seated Woman, 1957 =

Sculpture series by Henry Moore

- Artist: Henry Moore
- Year: 1956-1957
- Catalogue: LH 435
- Type: Bronze
- Dimensions: 160 cm × 142.9 cm × 105.1 cm (62 in × 56 1/4 in × 41 3/8 in)
- Location: Washington, D.C. and Kansas City

Seated Woman is a bronze sculpture by Henry Moore, catalogued as LH 435. Examples are in the Hirshhorn Museum and Sculpture Garden, Washington, D.C., and Nelson-Atkins Museum of Art in Kansas City.

== See also ==
- List of sculptures by Henry Moore
- List of public art in Washington, D.C., Ward 2
