= Draped Reclining Figure, 1952–53 =

Sculpture series by Henry Moore

Draped Reclining Figure
- Draped Reclining Figure - (LH 336 cast d)
- Artist: Henry Moore
- Year: 1952–1953
- Catalogue: LH 336
- Type: Bronze
- Dimensions: (40 7/8 in × 66 5/8 in × 34 1/8 in)

Draped Reclining Figure, 1952–53 is a bronze sculpture by Henry Moore, catalogued as "LH 336".

== Casts ==
The sculpture was cast in an edition of four (or "3+1"; one being retained by the artist). The artist's copy, cast d, was given to the Henry Moore Foundation and is on display in their sculpture garden around his old house at Perry Green, Hertfordshire. Other copies in the edition are in the Hirshhorn Museum and Sculpture Garden in Washington, D.C., and the Museum Ludwig in Cologne, Germany.

== Origin ==
The work was a precursor to later draped figures. According to the artist's foundation, it "successfully added the contours of natural forms as well as a distinct hint of classicism to the repose of his figures, yet preserved that sense of immutability conveyed by the Mexican Chacmool figures that had so profoundly influenced the younger artist."

== See also ==
- List of sculptures by Henry Moore
- List of public art in Washington, D.C., Ward 2
