= Reclining Figure: External Form 1953–1954 =

Sculpture series by Henry Moore

Reclining Figure: External Form 1953–54
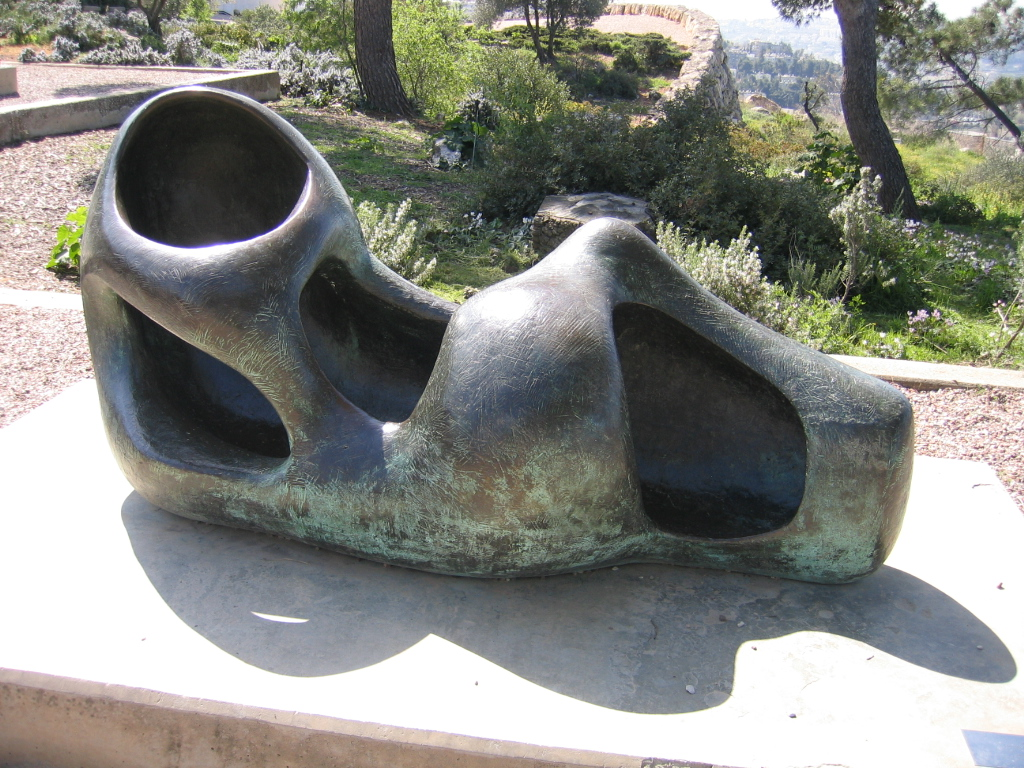
- At the Israel Museum in 2006
- Artist: Henry Moore
- Year: 1953-1954
- Catalogue: LH 299
- Type: Bronze
- Dimensions: 213.5 cm (84.1 in)
- Location: Israel Museum, Jerusalem

Reclining Figure: External Form 1953–54 is a bronze sculpture by Henry Moore, catalogued as LH 299. It is approximately 2.1 m long. Casts are owned by de:Vermögen und Bau Baden-Württemberg; the National Gallery of Modern Art, Rome; and the National Museum of Fine Arts, Buenos Aires.

== See also ==
- List of sculptures by Henry Moore
