= Three Piece Reclining Figure No. 2: Bridge Prop =

Sculpture series by Henry Moore

Three-Piece Reclining Figure No. 2: Bridge Prop
- Artist: Henry Moore
- Year: 1963
- Catalogue: LH 513
- Type: Bronze
- Dimensions: 116 cm × 252 cm × 132 cm (46 in × 99 in × 52 in)
- Weight: 895 kg (1,973 lb)

Three-Piece Reclining Figure No. 2: Bridge Prop is a sculpture by Henry Moore, created in 1963, and produced in an edition of six copies.

== Locations ==
Casts include:

- The Tate Modern in London
- The Henry Moore Foundation in their sculpture garden around his old house at Perry Green, Hertfordshire (on loan from Leeds Museums and Galleries)
- David Winton Bell Gallery in Providence, Rhode Island. Installed in 1963 on the main campus green at Brown University. It is catalogued as LH513.
- The Hirshhorn Museum and Sculpture Garden in Washington, D.C.

== History ==
According to the Henry Moore Foundation:

Over the years Moore made a large and varied number of drawings in which the reclining figure is almost supine yet with acutely uplifted knees. Three Piece Reclining Figure: No.2: Bridge Prop, an enlarged and more angular version of Three Piece Reclining Figure 1963 (LH 513a), takes the idea of separating or fragmenting the figure to an extreme level. The three elements are pulled far away from each other, appearing disparate and disjointed on the flat expanse of the base, so that connecting them and their intervening negative spaces to form a sculptural whole places considerable demands on the viewer.

Moore himself said:

The two-piece sculptures pose a problem of relationship: the kind of relationship between two people. It’s very different once you divide a thing into three. In the two-piece you have just the head end and the body end, or the head end and the leg end, but once you get the three-piece you have the middle and the two ends; and this became something that I wanted to do.

== See also ==
- List of sculptures by Henry Moore
- List of public art in Washington, D.C., Ward 2
