= Corsehill (stone) =

Type of building stone

Corsehill stone is a type of building stone, extracted from Corsehill Quarry in Annandale, Dumfries and Galloway, Scotland. It is a red sandstone of Triassic age, used extensively for buildings in the 19th and 20th centuries.

== Quarry ==
On November 8th, 1993, the United States Senate passed a resolution calling for the construction of a memorial to honour the victims of the Lockerbie Bombing. Blocks of red sandstone from the Corsehill Quarry were used to build the Lockerbie Bombing cairn in Arlington National Cemetery.
