= Reclining Figure 1939 =

Sculpture by Henry Moore

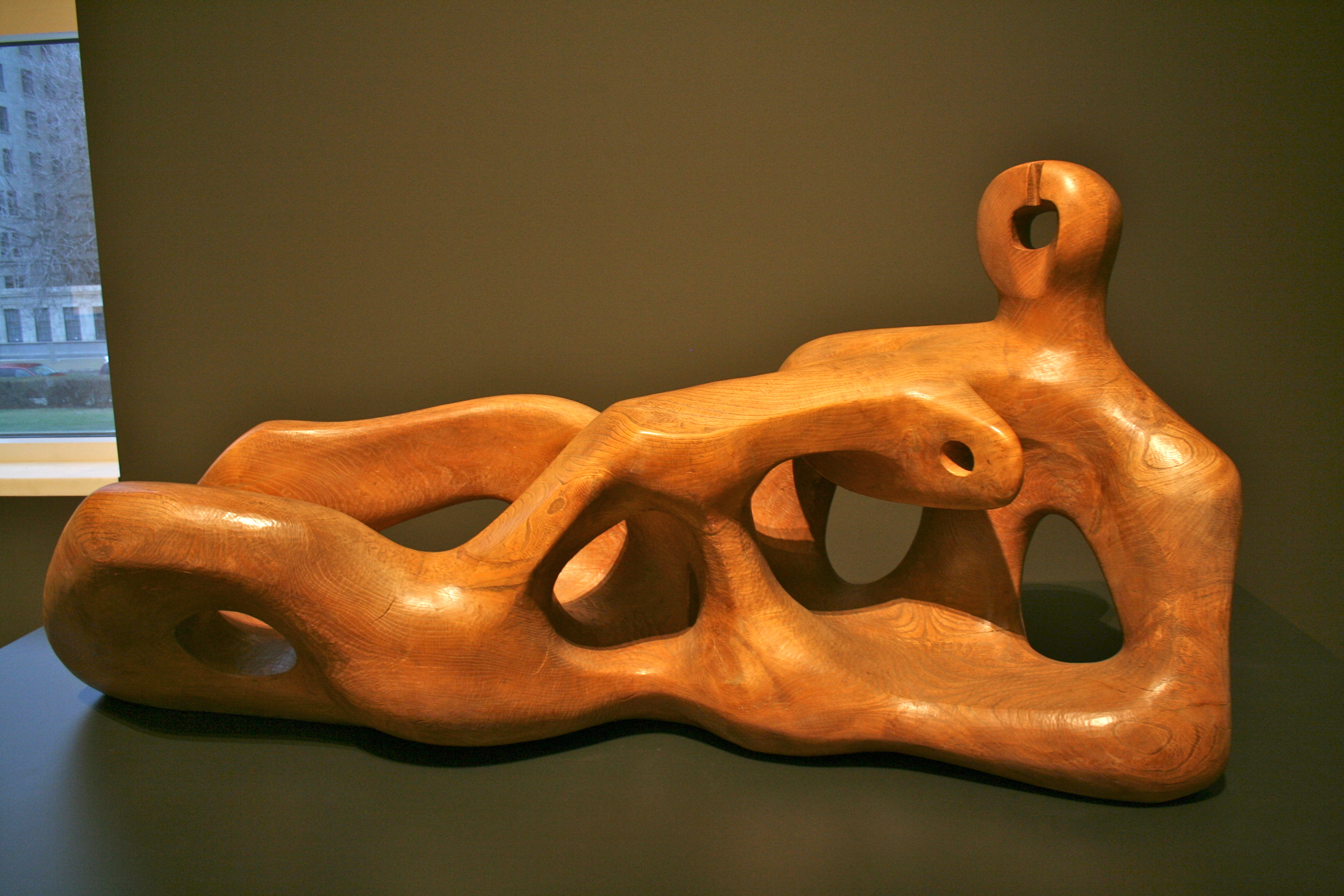
- Sculpture at the Detroit Institute of Art
- Artist: Henry Moore
- Year: 1939
- Catalogue: LH 210
- Medium: Elm wood
- Dimensions: 205.8 cm (81.0 in)
- Location: Detroit Institute of Art

Reclining Figure 1939 (LH 210) is an elmwood sculpture by Henry Moore. It is an abstracted reclining human figure, with looped head, shoulders, and sinuous body and limbs.

== Predecessor ==
The sculpture draws on Moore's small terracotta 1938 Reclining Figure (8.5 inches (22 cm) long, now lost) which was cast in bronze (LH 185, in an edition of 7+1: seven casts for sale, and one artist's copy).

== Description ==
Moore scaled up the earlier sculpture up to carve in wood, creating a unique work which measures 94 by 200.7 by 76.2 centimetres (37.0 in × 79.0 in × 30.0 in). It is one of six large reclining figures in elmwood carved by Moore between 1935 and 1978. The wide grain of elm made it a good choice for his larger carvings, and he uses the grain to emphasise different parts of the work.

== Sales ==
Moore sold the wooden sculpture to fellow artist Gordon Onslow Ford for £300, and used the money to buy other half of his house, Hoglands, in Perry Green, Hertfordshire. The sculpture was acquired by the Detroit Institute of Arts in 1965.

== See also ==
- List of sculptures by Henry Moore
