= The Arch 1979–1980 =

Sculpture by Henry Moore (LH 503c, Kensington Gardens, London)

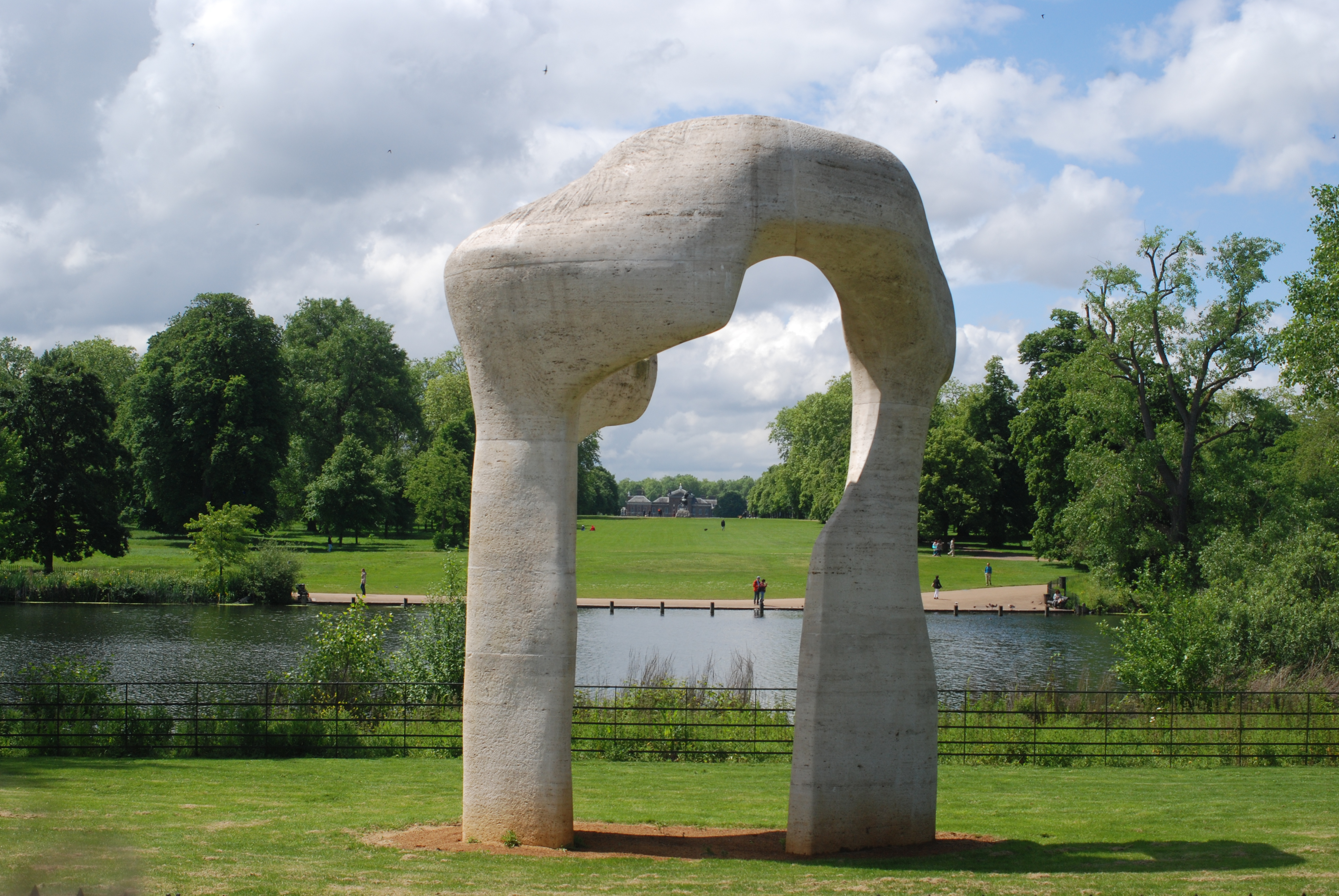
- Kensington Gardens, May 2014
- Interactive fullscreen map
- Artist: Henry Moore
- Year: 1979–1980
- Catalogue: LH 503c
- Type: Stone sculpture
- Medium: Travertine
- Dimensions: 580 cm × 455 cm × 355 cm (230 in × 179 in × 140 in)
- Location: Kensington Gardens, London; 51°30′26.99″N 0°10′23.31″W

The Arch 1979–1980 by Henry Moore, Kensington Gardens, August 2026

The Arch 1979–1980 (LH 503c) is a large stone sculpture by Henry Moore located in Kensington Gardens, London. It was given to the park by Moore in 1980.

== Comment of the artist ==
In a 1980 interview Moore said that "After the 1978 exhibition at the Serpentine Gallery in London, in which several large pieces were located in Kensington Gardens, there was a request for me to leave a sculpture there permanently, which I agreed to do. I thought the Large Arch was very naturally sited, particularly as it could be seen reflected in the water from across the lake. During the exhibition, many people believed the sculpture to be made of marble, but in fact it was a fibreglass exhibition cast made originally for my exhibition at the Forte di Belvedere in Florence (1963), because of the difficulty of getting a very heavy bronze or marble on to the site. Therefore, so that it could be left as a permanent sculpture in Kensington Gardens, I produced a version in travertine marble which is a very lasting material."

== Restoration ==
The Arch was found to be unstable in 1996, and was subsequently dismantled and placed into storage. It was restored and replaced in its original location in 2012.

== See also ==
- List of sculptures by Henry Moore
