= Didrichsen Art Museum =

Art museum in Helsinki, Finland

Coordinates: 60°11′7″N 24°51′23″E

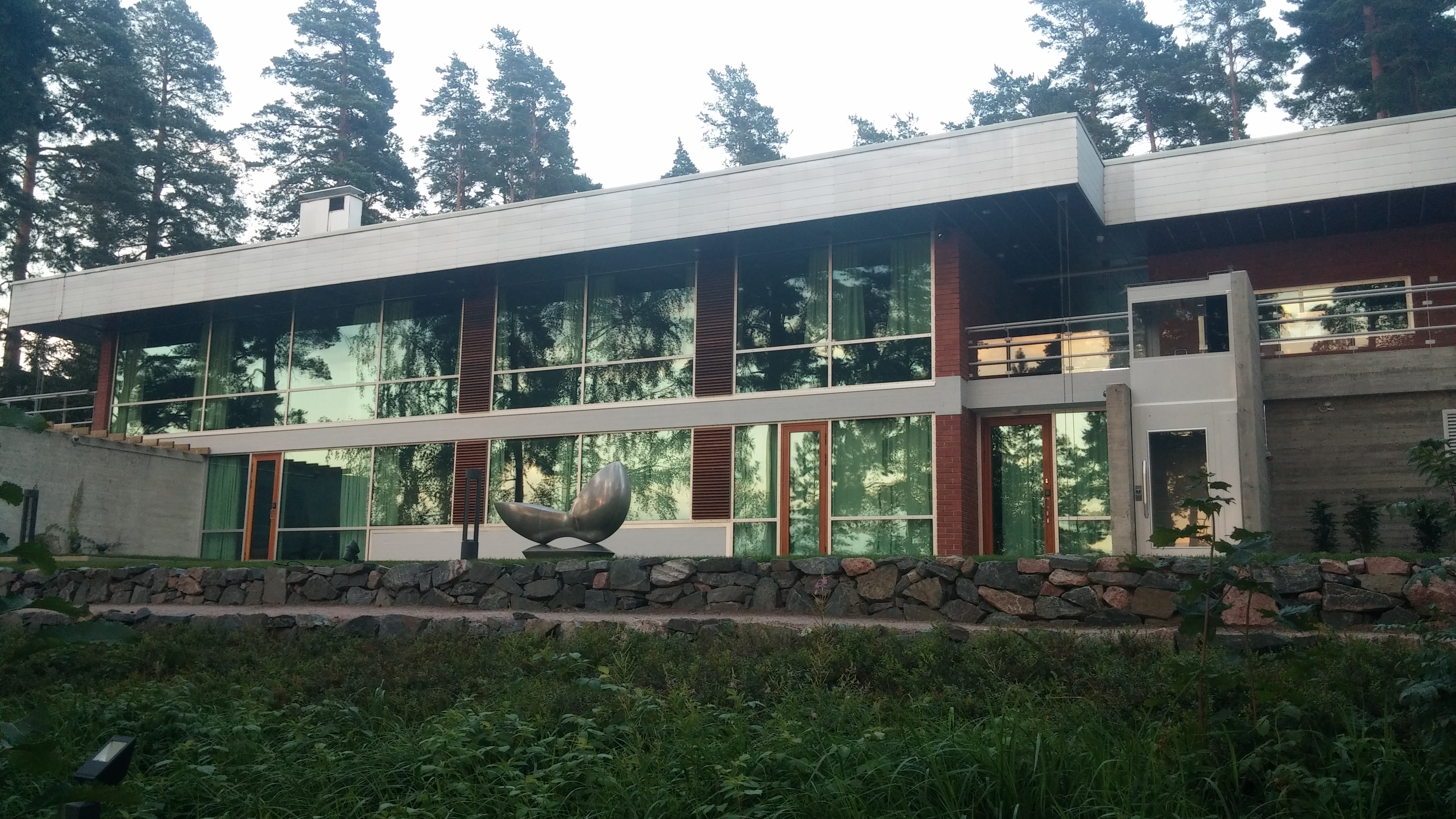
- Interactive map of the Didrichsen Art Museum area

General information
- Architectural style: Modernist
- Location: Helsinki, Finland
- Completed: 1965, 1967

Design and construction
- Architect: Viljo Revell

Didrichsen Art Museum (Finnish: Didrichsenin taidemuseo, Swedish: Didrichsens konstmuseum) is an art museum in Helsinki, Finland.

== History ==
The art museum was founded by Marie-Louise and Gunnar Didrichsen, who asked Finnish architect Viljo Revell to build the first of two phases in 1958 and again in 1965.

The modernist buildings are built to the contours of the land and surrounded by trees.

== Location ==
The museum is located on the island of Kuusisaari. The founders have since died and are buried within the compound of the museum.

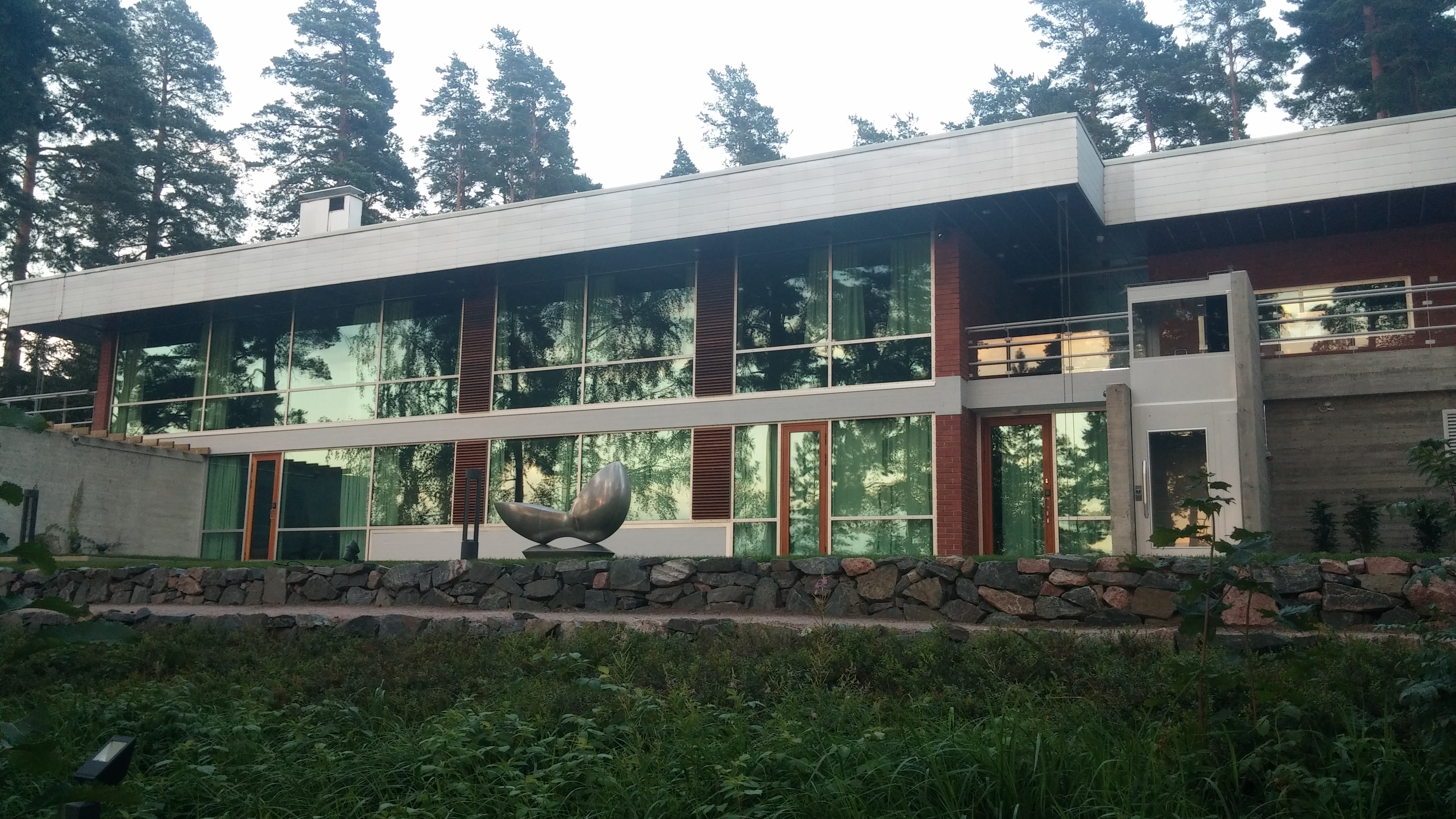
