= Laureate (disambiguation) =

The word Laureate has come to signify eminence or association with literary awards or military glory.

Laureate may also refer to:

- Laureate Academy, a secondary school in Hemel Hempstead, Hertfordshire, England
- Laureate Education, an American public-benefit corporation
- The Laureate, an upcoming British film about poet Robert Graves
