= John Nash, Baron Nash =

British barrister, businessman and schools minister (born 1949)

The Right Honourable The Lord Nash
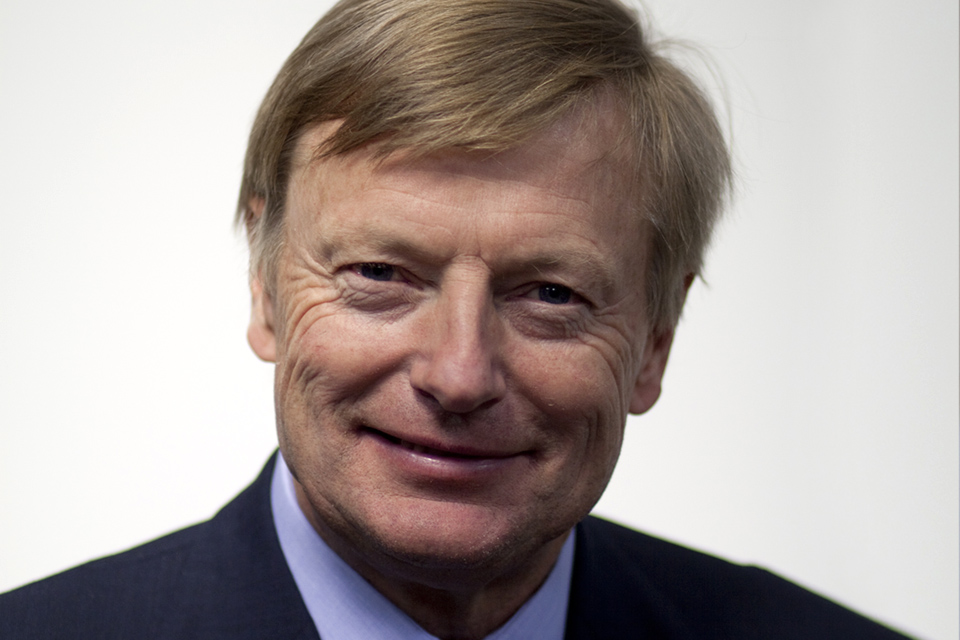

Parliamentary Under-Secretary of State for School System
- In office 7 January 2013 – 28 September 2017
- Prime Minister: David Cameron; Theresa May
- Preceded by: The Lord Hill of Oareford
- Succeeded by: The Lord Agnew of Oulton

Member of the House of Lords
- Lord Temporal
- Life peerage 21 January 2013

Personal details
- Born: 22 March 1949 (age 77)
- Education: Milton Abbey School, Dorset
- Alma mater: Corpus Christi College, Oxford
- Occupation: investor

John Alfred Stoddard Nash, Baron Nash (born 22 March 1949) is a Venture Capitalist and former Conservative Parliamentary Under Secretary of State for Schools. Nash was chair of the British Venture Capital Association (1988–89), on the board of the Conservative think-tank, the Centre for Policy Studies and a Trustee of the Education Policy Institute. With his wife, Caroline Nash, he founded the charity Future, which was appointed by the Labour Government in 2008 to sponsor Future Academies, a trust managing school academies in London and Hertfordshire with a total of 7000 pupils; he is joint chairman of the governors of Pimlico Academy, one of the institutions run by Future Academies. Future also supports other organisations focussed on less advantaged children and young people.

== Education ==
John Nash was educated at Milton Abbey School, a boarding independent school in the village of Milton Abbas (near Blandford Forum) in Dorset, followed by Corpus Christi College, Oxford, where he read Law, and obtained an M.A.

== Career ==
After reading Law at Corpus Christi College, Oxford, Nash became a barrister before moving into finance. Nash was Assistant Director of Lazard Brothers and Co Ltd (1975–1983) before moving to private equity firm Advent Limited, becoming its managing director in 1986. He was co-founder of private equity firm Sovereign Capital, as well as being chair of the British Venture Capital Association from 1988 to 1989. He is a former judge of The Prince of Wales Award for Innovation. He is also the former chairman of one of the biggest contractors to the NHS, Care UK. In January 2013 Nash left Sovereign Capital to pursue his political interests.

== Political career ==
In January 2013 Lord Nash was appointed as schools minister. He became a life peer as Baron Nash, of Ewelme in the County of Oxfordshire on 21 January 2013. Prior to that, he was a non-executive director of the Department for Education between 2010 and 2013. As schools minister he was responsible for the academies and free schools programmes. During his tenure the number of academies grew from c2000 to c7000 and several hundred free schools were opened. He was also responsible for school capital allocation, independent schools, faith schools and state boarding schools. He initiated the Boarding Schools Partnership to encourage local authorities to send more less advantaged children and children in care to state and independent boarding schools on bursaryships. Nash spearheaded the Academy Ambassador programme, which has now recruited over 1,500 volunteers with business backgrounds to improve the governance and financial controls of academy schools.

During his tenure he took five Acts of Parliament through the House of Lords: The Children and Families Act 2014, The Education and Adoption Act 2016, The Childcare Act 2016, The Technical and Further Education Act 2017 and The Children and Social Work Act 2017.

He and his wife have donated almost £300,000 to the Conservative Party and according to the Telegraph, the appointment raises concern about a potential conflict of interest and appointment of donors though the Department for Education said he would not make business decisions whilst in office.

In October 2016, following a backlash from schools and parents and the national boycott of the school census expansion, he wrote that newly collected pupils' nationality and country of birth data would not be included in the National Pupil Database (NPD). In a letter to peers seen by Schools Week, Nash defended the sharing of pupil address and school data with the Home Office, but stated the new information called for a different approach, saying, "given the sensitivity of the new information being collected we will not add this to the NPD, so no-one outside the department will be able to access it." Members of the House of Lords went on to oppose the law change in a debate and motion-of-regret, which was tabled by the Liberal Democrat education spokesperson Lord Storey.

On 31 October 2016 the House of Lords agreed after debate, with the regret motion on the expansion of the collection of pupil data: "That this House regrets that information about pupils' nationality and country of birth collected under the Education (Pupil Information) (England) (Miscellaneous Amendments) Regulations 2016 (Statutory Instrument 2016/808)[3] could be used to help determine a child's immigration status."

Lord Nash resigned from government on 28 September 2017 and was replaced by Sir Theodore Agnew DL as an unpaid Parliamentary Under Secretary of State at the Department for Education.

He was the lead non-executive director across government and a non-executive director of The Cabinet Office between 2020 and 2022.

Orders of precedence in the United Kingdom
Preceded by The Lord Deighton	Gentlemen; Baron Nash	Followed by The Lord Berkeley of Knighton
