= Family Group (Moore) =

Sculpture series by Henry Moore

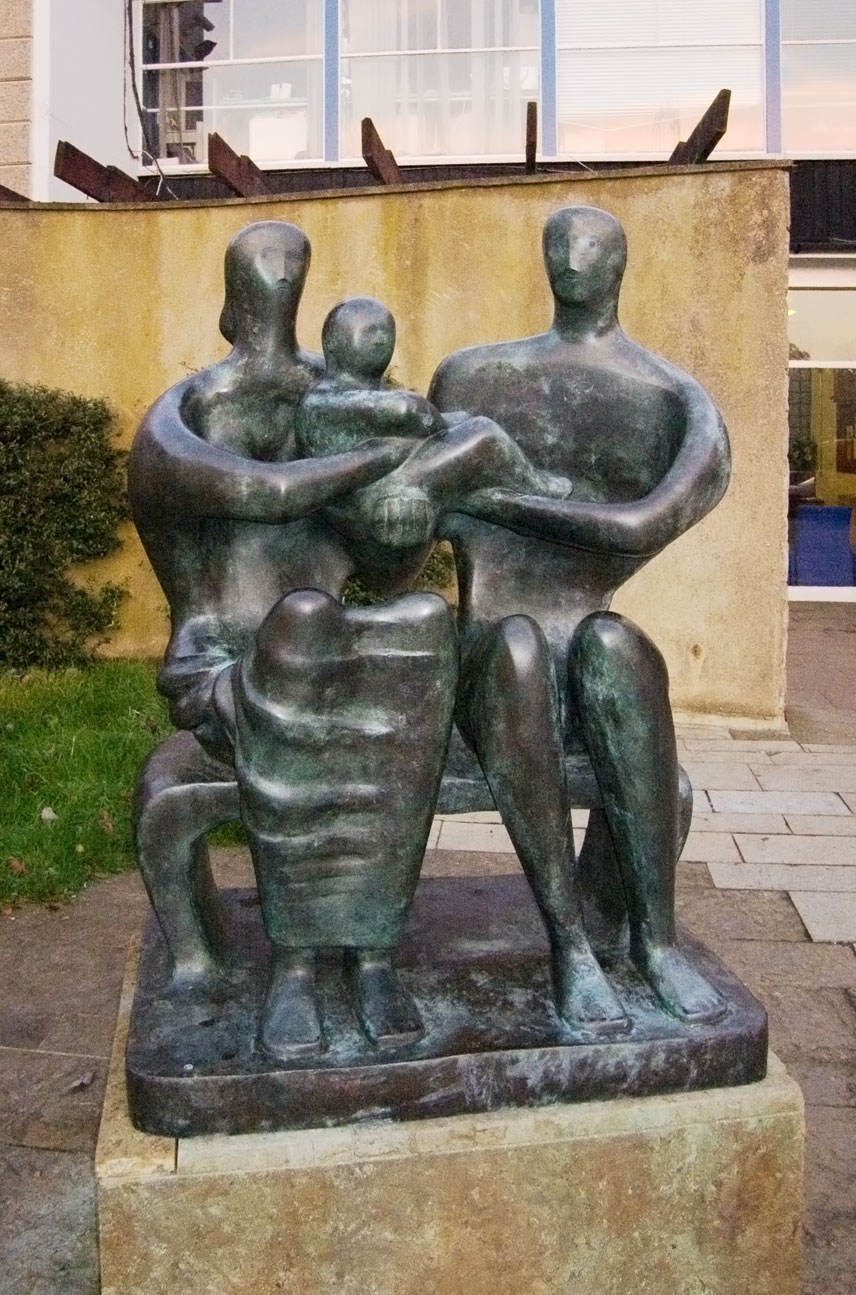
- outside Barclay School in 2005
- Artist: Henry Moore
- Year: 1949
- Catalogue: LH 269
- Medium: Bronze
- Dimensions: 152 cm (60 in)
- Location: Barclay Academy, Stevenage

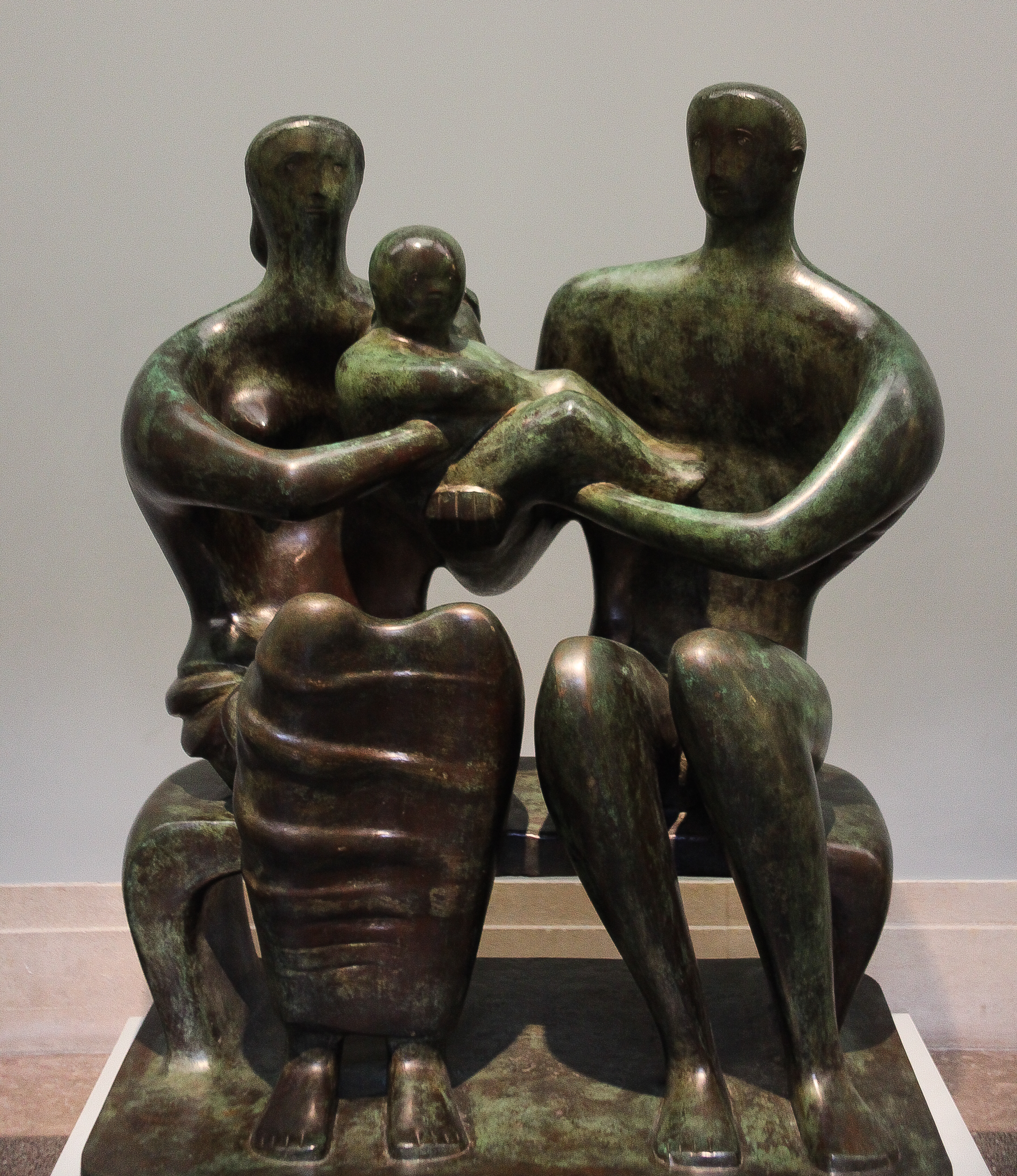
Family Group, LH 269, Tate Gallery

Family Group (LH 269) is a sculpture by Henry Moore. It was his first large-scale bronze sculpture, and his first large bronze with multiple castings. Made for Barclay School in Stevenage, it evolved from drawings in the 1930s, through a series of models to bronze castings in 1950–51. It is also one of the last important sculptures that Moore developed from preliminary drawings: in future, he worked mainly from found objects, maquettes and models.

The sculpture depicts a group of three human figures, a stereotypical nuclear family comprising a man, a woman and a small child. The two adults are sitting on a bench, holding the child between them. The figures are slightly smaller than life size. Three of the five castings from the 1950s are still owned by the original owners, Barclay School, the Tate Gallery, and the Museum of Modern Art in New York. The others are held by the Hakone Open-Air Museum in Japan, and the Norton Simon Museum in Pasadena, with a later cast at the Henry Moore Foundation in Perry Green, Hertfordshire.

== Background ==
The work began with drawings and maquettes made by Moore in the mid-1930s after Walter Gropius suggested a Moore sculpture for Impington Village College. The college opened in 1939, but the war stopped Cambridgeshire County Council giving a commission to Moore. The council's education officer Henry Morris approached Moore again in 1944, and Moore made a small clay model in 1945, now held by the Henry Moore Foundation in Perry Green, Hertfordshire. In this model, the father's head had a distinctive notch, also seen in other early works such as Four-Piece Composition: Reclining Figure of 1934, and Reclining Figure 1938. Moore also made several other clay models, some cast in bronze, with three held by the Tate. Eventually, his ideas were rejected because funding was not available, and the project in Cambridgeshire went unrealised. An example of a cast from this early work, LH 239, is held by the Tate.

Moore returned to the design in 1947, when he was asked to create a sculpture for a new school in Stevenage, at a time when Hertfordshire County Council was involved in an ambitious building programme of new schools and devoted part of the budget to sourcing artworks from leading British artists. Barclay School was designed by Yorke Rosenberg Mardall, and was the first purpose-built secondary school constructed in the UK after the Second World War. Despite some reluctance from the council members, Moore was formally commissioned in 1949. He accepted a small fee, just £750, sufficient to cover the cost of materials, casting and transport, on condition that he could make further copies for commercial sale.

He reworked a selected small clay maquette as a small plaster model, removing the notch from the male's head, so the three figures became more similar to each other (see LH 259), and then enlarged this model to a full-size plaster model, over an armature, working with his assistant Bernard Meadows. This was the first time Moore made a near-life-size plaster model. The large plaster model was completed in 1949, and they then made a plaster second model, before casting the sculpture in bronze.

== Description ==
The sculpture group comprises three human figures, on a low bench: woman, man, and child. It measures 154 by 118 by 70 centimetres (61 in × 46 in × 28 in) and weighs 475 kilograms (1,047 lb).

The woman sits to the right, with hair gathered in a bun, small breasts, and a skirt draped round her body and legs. She is holding the child in the air above her lap with both hands. The man sits to the left, supporting the child with his left hand, and resting his right hand on the woman's left shoulder. The two adults mirror each other, turning slightly towards each other and leaning slightly back, with their outside arms curving towards the centre of the composition. Moore said: "the arms of the mother and the father [intertwine] with the child forming a knot between them, tying the three into a family unity".

== Reception ==
The first bronze, for Barclay School, was cast at the Fiorini Art Bronze Foundry in London, using a lost wax process to cast sections of the work which were then assembled. The large sculpture tested their facilities, and took nearly a year to complete. It was installed in Stevenage in 1949. Local opinion was not uniformly positive: a local postman was quoted as saying it resembled something from Belsen. (A similarly unflattering comparison was made to his Reclining Figure: Festival, exhibited at the Festival of Britain in 1951.)

Meanwhile, two bronze copies were cast by Fonderie Rudier, in Paris, using a sand casting method. Both were bought by Moore's preferred art dealer in New York, Curt Valentin, and one was quickly sold to the Museum of Modern Art in New York. MOMA had housed Moore's Recumbent Figure 1938 during the Second World War, where it had been for an exhibition, before it returned to the UK. Family Group went on display at MOMA in February 1951. After discussions with John Rothenstein at the Tate Gallery, and an approach from Nelson Rockefeller who also wanted a copy, Moore sold one copy to Rockefeller, and asked Fonderie Rudier to make a third bronze in 1951; the third Rudier bronze was acquired by the Tate, and included in a solo exhibition there in May 1951. The foundry also made a fourth bronze, as an artist's copy.

Moore made several similar works, including a stone sculpture for Harlow in 1954, his Harlow Family Group (LH 364).

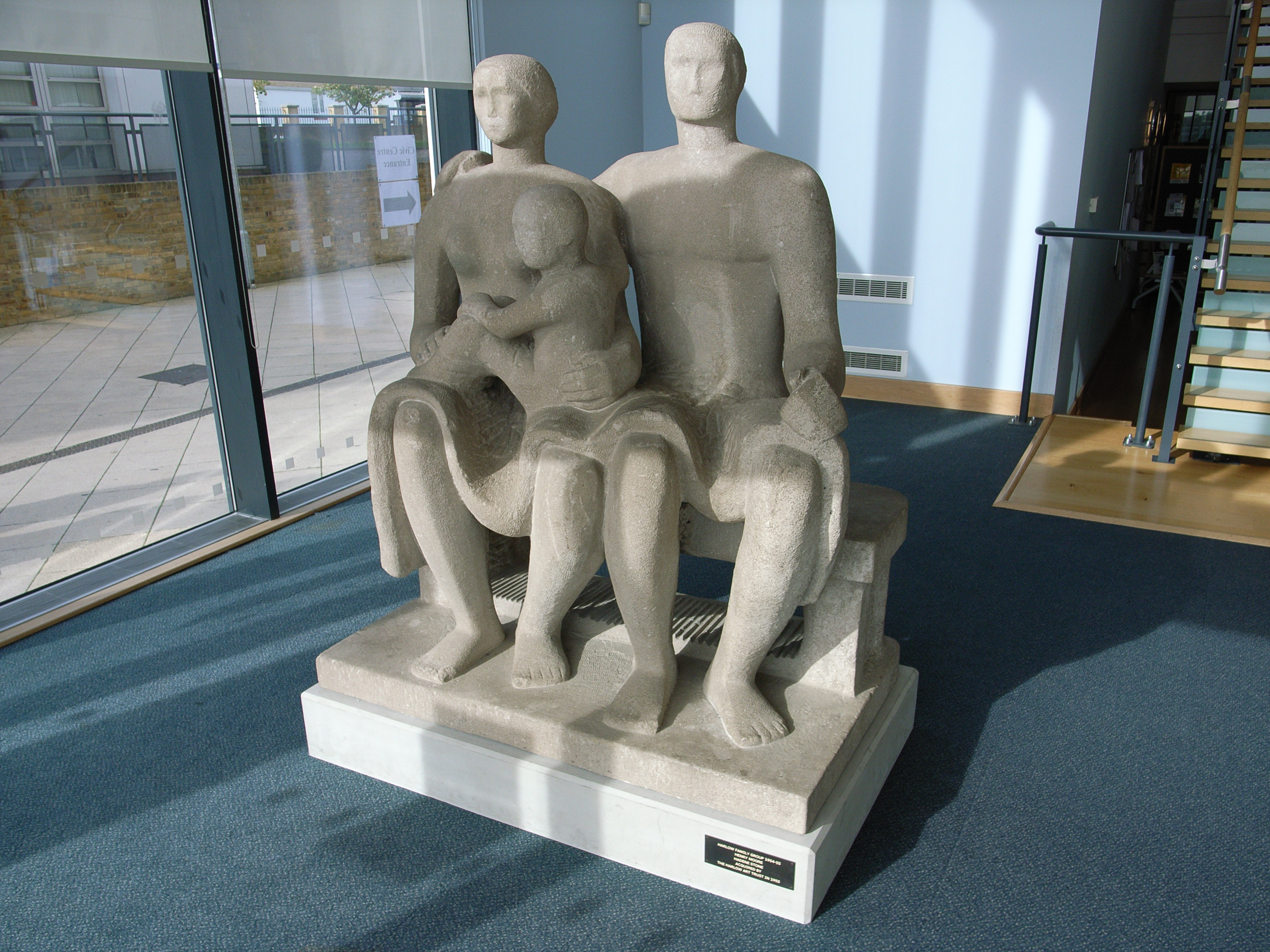
Harlow Family Group, 1954, LH 364

A second artist’s copy was cast by the Morris Singer Foundry in 1992, which is held by the Henry Moore Foundation, bringing Family Group up to an edition of 4 + 2 (four casts plus two artist's copies). Three of the five (4 + 1) original 1950s castings remain with their original owners: Barclay School, the Tate, and MOMA. Rockefeller's copy is now at the Hakone Open-Air Museum in Japan, and Moore's original artist's copy is now owned by the Norton Simon Museum in Pasadena.

The model in Stevenage was originally displayed outdoors, and remained beside a curved curtain wall outside the school's entrance for 60 years. It became a Grade II listed building in 1993. After an unsuccessful attempt to steal the sculpture in May 2010, it was moved to a more secure place inside to the school's reception area.

== See also ==
- List of sculptures by Henry Moore
