= Laureate Academy =

Location
- Warners End Road; Hemel Hempstead, Hertfordshire, HP1 3DW; England; 51°45′27″N 0°29′00″W

Information
- Type: Academy
- Motto: Libertas Per Cultum
- Established: 2018
- Local authority: Hertfordshire
- Trust: Future Academies
- Department for Education URN: 146440 Tables
- Ofsted: Reports
- Principal: Ruthie Jacobs
- Gender: Coeducational
- Age: 11 to 18
- Enrolment: 695
- Houses: Zeus, Apollo, Hera, Athena
- Colours: Blue, White, Black
- Website: https://www.laureate.futureacademies.org/

Laureate Academy is a secondary school in Hemel Hempstead, Hertfordshire, United Kingdom. The academy was launched in September 2018 on the site of Cavendish School. Laureate Academy is part of Future Academies, a multi-academy trust.

== History ==
Cavendish Grammar School was officially opened in 1962 and was one of the first of the new breed of post-war technical grammar schools. From 1970 the school became a comprehensive school, The Cavendish School.

In 2018, Cavendish School closed and reopened as Laureate Academy; the takeover was part of an expansion of Lord Nash's Future Academies multi-academy trust which controversially extended to other schools in Hertfordshire in 2019 despite concerns about the trust's governance and despite parents' opposition. Concerns were raised about the introduction of compulsory Latin at Laureate Academy, with parents fearing the trust planned a grammar school-type emphasis on academic rather than vocational options.

in July 2020, Laureate Academy was ranked the 7th worst school in Hertfordshire.

In 2022, an outdated teaching block was demolished to be replaced by a new building and a new multi-use games area.

In June 2023, the school was inspected by Ofsted and graded Good.
