= Barclay Academy =

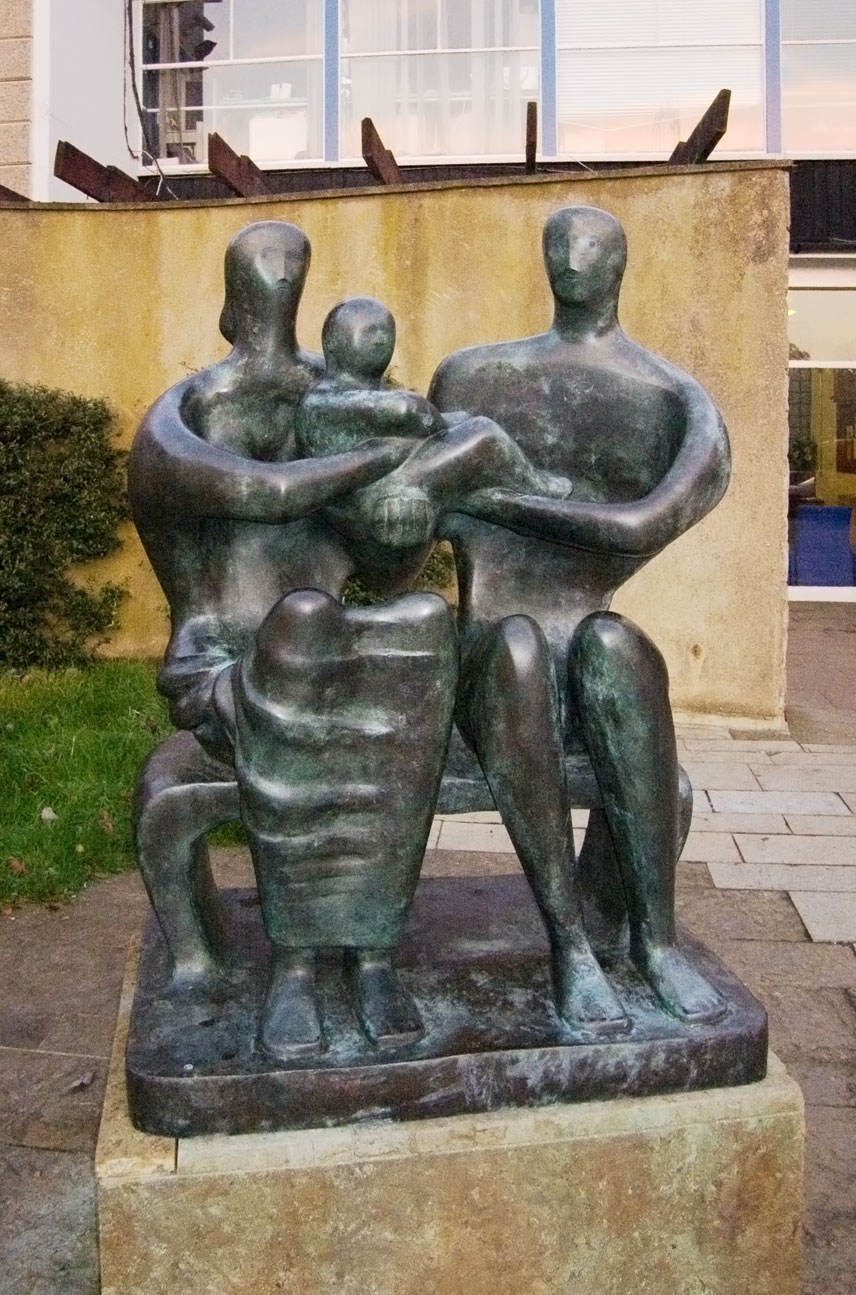

Location
- Walkern Road; Stevenage, Hertfordshire, SG1 3RB; England; 51.914537°N 0.202582°W

Information
- Former name: The Barclay School
- Type: Academy
- Motto: Libertas per cultum
- Established: 1949
- Local authority: Hertfordshire
- Department for Education URN: 144623 Tables
- Ofsted: Reports
- Head teacher: Scarlett O'Sulliva
- Gender: Mixed
- Age: 11 to 18
- Enrolment: 1100
- Houses: Zeus, Hera, Athena, & Apollo
- Colour: Blue
- Publication: Barclay Bugle
- Website: https://www.barclay.futureacademies.org

Barclay Academy is a secondary school and sixth form located in Stevenage, Hertfordshire, England. The current head teacher is Scarlett O'Sullivan.

Opening in 1949, it was the first purpose-built secondary school constructed in the UK after the Second World War and was awarded a Festival of Britain architectural award in 1951. In May 2019, the school celebrated its 70th anniversary.

The school contains a large bronze statue by Henry Moore, Family Group, which was placed at the school's main entrance and is now inside and can be seen in the front of the school. On 22 January 2018, the BBC visited the school to clear up why the statue had been moved, as there had been an attempted robbery on it in 2009.

The school was taken over by Future Academies Trust and converted into an academy in February 2019.
