= Future Academies Watford =

Location
- Horseshoe Lane; Garston; Watford, Hertfordshire, WD25 7HW; England; 51.6977°N 0.3922°W

Information
- Type: Academy
- Motto: libertas per cultum (Freedom through education)
- Established: 1954
- Local authority: Hertfordshire County Council
- Trust: Future Academies
- Department for Education URN: 135876 Tables
- Ofsted: Reports
- Principal: Sam Fox
- Gender: Co-educational
- Age range: 11–18
- Enrolment: 1,090 (2019)
- Capacity: 1,350
- Website: www.watford.futureacademies.org

Future Academies Watford is a co-educational secondary school and sixth form located in Garston, Watford, Hertfordshire, England.

== History ==
The school opened in September 1954 as Francis Combe School, a secondary modern school. It was named after Francis Combe (or Combes), a Hemel Hempstead landowner who founded a charity school in Watford in 1651, with a bequest of £10 per annum.

It became the first comprehensive in Watford in 1966. Previously a community school administered by Hertfordshire County Council, in February 2008, the school was given permission to explore becoming an academy, sponsored by West Herts College and the University of Hertfordshire (later the Meller Educational Trust). The school reopened in September 2009 as Francis Combe Academy, specialising in English, art and media.

In 2020, the name was changed to Future Academies Watford when the school became part of the Future Academies multi-academy trust.

== Facilities ==
All of the school's buildings were rebuilt in 2012 except for the English and Maths block, which was built in 2001 (currently the English, Maths, Drama and Latin building at current time September 2024). The £25 million rebuild, which connects to the older building, features three storeys and houses Science, Languages, IT and Humanities (originally Maths). The sports department includes a large sports hall, a fitness studio and changing rooms. Two new outdoor spaces, the MUGA (multi use sports and games area) and the Agora. A new entrance foyer and a new art department focuses on open plan and collaborative working with no fixed walls between classrooms.

== Notable former pupils ==
Francis Combe School and Community College

- Bradley Walsh, comedian, television presenter, actor, singer, and former professional footballer
- Kelly Smith, professional footballer
- Mark Ilott, professional cricketer
