= Future Academies =

- Established: 2006
- Type: Multi Academy Trust
- Key people: Lord Nash, Caroline Nash, Lawrence Foley
- Website: FutureAcademies.org

Future Academies is a multi-academy trust running 10 primary and secondary schools, a teacher training college and the Centre for Latin Excellence. The schools are located in London and Hertfordshire in England. The trust's motto is Libertas Per Cultum (freedom through education).

It was set up by the charity Future, established by former stockbroker Caroline Nash and her husband, Lord Nash, in 2006. Lord Nash is a venture capitalist and UK Conservative Party donor, and was a schools minister between 2013 and 2017.

== Establishments ==
=== Academies ===
Primary schools:

- Ashtree Primary Academy
- Millbank Gardens Primary Academy
- Pimlico Primary Academy

Secondary schools:

- Barclay Academy
- Future Academies Watford
- Gracewood Academy
- Laureate Academy
- Phoenix Academy
- Pimlico Academy
- The Grange Academy
- Trinity Academy

=== Teacher training college ===
- Future Teacher Training (2014 - colocated with Pimlico Academy)

== Controversies ==
In 2013 Labour councillors called for an inquiry after a new Pimlico primary school, where Nash was co-chairman of the governors, appointed an unqualified teacher as headmistress ahead of its opening with 60 pupils in September 2013. Further criticism followed in October when she resigned after four weeks in the job. The school said that the headmistress had successfully set up the school and wished to pursue other opportunities. Also in October 2013, a second headteacher, the acting head of nearby Churchill Gardens academy, was allegedly forced from her position following bullying by Future Academies managers.

In 2014, Future Academies pushed ahead and opened the Trinity Academy in an area with 200 surplus school places when it only had 17 pupils prepared to attend. It is not understood why the Conservative government did not cancel the project, as it did in 2012 with another under-subscribed school, Newham Free Academy. Previously the government had spent £18 million securing the site for the trust.

In 2016, discussing issues raised by deregulation of the education sector, the National Union of Teachers cited Future Academies after the Nashes' daughter Jo, unqualified as a teacher, was given an unpaid teaching position at the trust's Pimlico Academy. An Oxford University history graduate, Jo Nash had previously worked in the office of the Tory minister Iain Duncan Smith; she joined Future as an unqualified teacher and as an adviser to help design the history curriculum and recruit teachers.

In 2018, Hemel Hempstead's Cavendish School was reopened as Laureate Academy during an expansion of Future Academies which also extended to other schools in Hertfordshire in 2019 despite concerns about the trust's governance and despite parents' opposition. Concerns were raised about the introduction of compulsory Latin at Laureate Academy, with parents fearing the trust planned a grammar school-type emphasis on academic rather than vocational options. in July 2020, Laureate Academy was ranked the 7th worst school in Hertfordshire. In June 2023, the school was inspected by Ofsted and graded Good.

In January 2019, Future Academies was criticised for poor governance practices, having four board members of whom three were also trustees. Government guidance, supported by Nash in 2017, recommended that trust boards should have five members and that most members should be independent of the board of trustees; if members also sit on the board of trustees this "may reduce the objectivity with which the members can exercise their powers".

In 2020, Pimlico Academy appointed a new head-teacher who changed the dress code in a way that alienated pupils, staff and parents and was seen as racist, because it forbade colourful hijabs and hairstyles with a lot of height, such as afros. In September 2020 students took down a union jack that had been erected outside their school, and burned it; graffiti appeared "Ain't no black in the Union Jack …". Staff held a no confidence vote, which passed with 99%, and 98% of the staff voted for strike action.

In September 2022, teachers from the academy chain voted to go on strike, claiming the trust was "blighting the life chances of the children" with a curriculum developed by Caroline Nash that was said to be among the most narrow in the country.
