= Pimlico Academy =

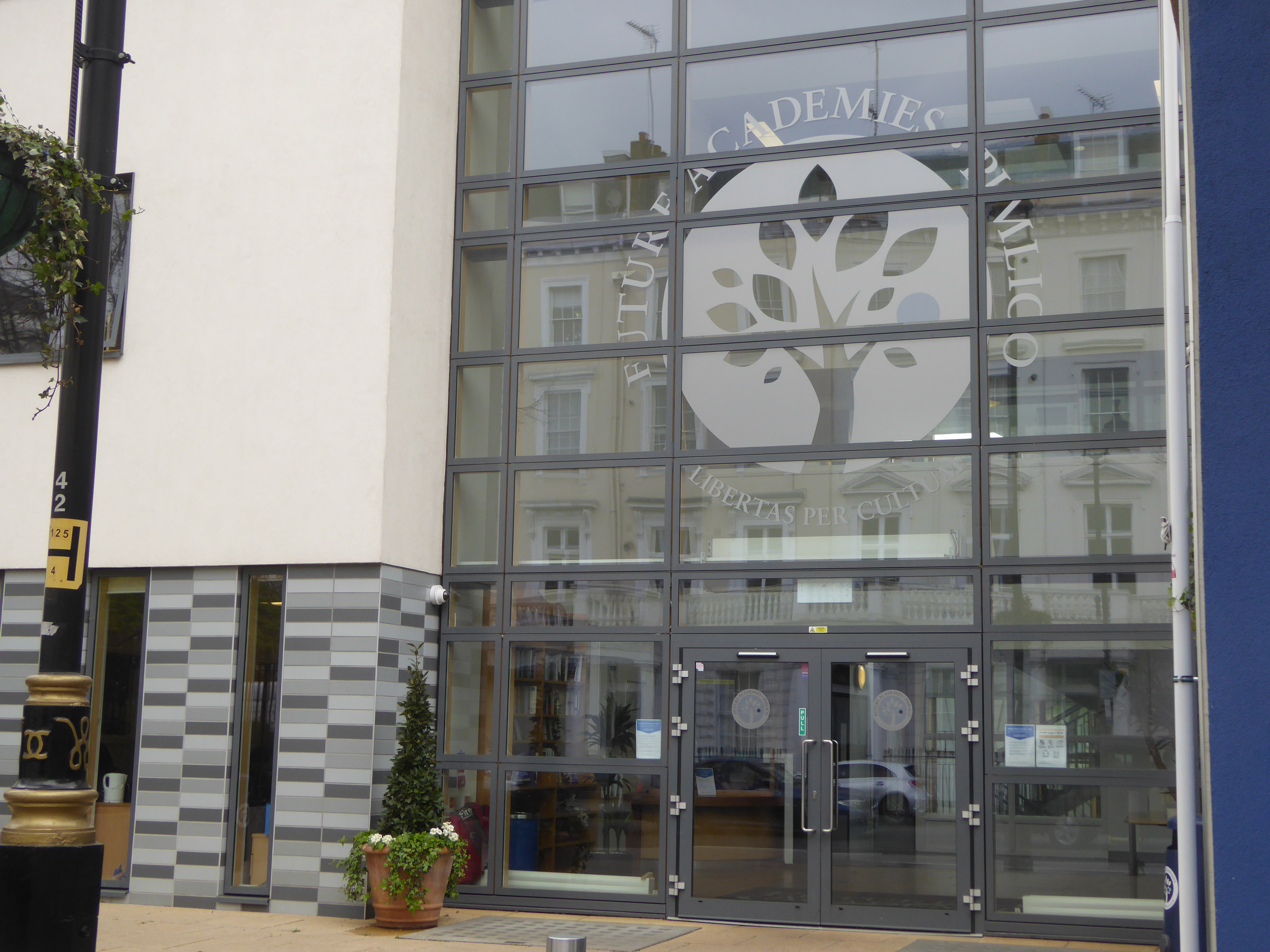
- Pimlico Academy in April 2021

Location
- Lupus Street; Westminster, London, SW1V 3AT; England; 51.488°N 0.137°W

Information
- Former name: Pimlico School
- Type: Academy
- Established: 2008
- Trust: Future Academies
- Department for Education URN: 135676 Tables
- Ofsted: Reports
- Chair: John Nash
- Head teacher: Tony Macdowall
- Gender: Male and Female
- Age: 11 to 18
- Enrolment: 1262
- Houses: Apollo, Athena, Hera and Zeus
- Colours: Apollo Blue, Athena Green, Hera Red, Zeus Yellow
- Website: www.pimlicoacademy.org

Pimlico Academy (formerly Pimlico School) is a co-ed secondary school and sixth form with academy status, located in the Pimlico area of Westminster in London.

== History ==
=== Pimlico School 1970-2008 ===
In 1970, four local schools in the Chelsea and Westminster area merged to form Pimlico Comprehensive School. These were Ebury Secondary School (Sutherland Road), Buckingham Gate School (Castle Lane), Sloane School (Hortensia Road), and Carlyle School (Hortensia Road). To make way for the site of the new Pimlico School, in the late 1960s, a row of houses on St George's Square were knocked down, which included 26 St George Square, where the writer of Dracula, Bram Stoker, had lived at the time of his death in 1912.

In 1971 the ILEA (Inner London Education Authority) incorporated a specialist music course at Pimlico School. About 15 places a year were available for children who showed an outstanding instrumental ability or potential. The activities and music tuition were specially timetabled, but for the most part the children were part of the mainstream of the school and took most of their lessons with the other pupils.

In the 1970s the ILEA also set up a centre for young musicians at Pimlico School, which used the music facilities of the school on Saturdays, which eventually became the Centre for Young Musicians, which moved to Morley College in 1990.

In response to rising anti-social behavior and crime in and around the school, as part of the then Labour Government's Street Crime Initiative, in 2002, Pimlico School was assigned a Police Officer whose role it was to patrol within and around the school, combating truancy, robberies, violence, unwanted visitors in the school (there was no uniform so non-students could enter the school with relative ease), and making links with the local community. This was PC David Atherfold, affectionately known as "PC Dave" to many of the students.

=== Conversion to academy ===
After many years of underperformance, culminating with Ofsted's decision to place the school in special measures and the resignation of former head teacher Phil Barnard in December 2006, Westminster council controversially voted in March 2008 to transform Pimlico into an academy. During this time, so called "Superhead" Jo Shuter was briefly head teacher at the school. She had earned this epithet by presiding over great improvements for a comprehensive school in North London called Quintin Kynaston School This decision was contrary to consistent expression from the school's stakeholders (teachers, students and parents) that they wanted the school to remain a community school. The Westminster NUT voted in favour of strike action to express their objections to Westminster council's strategy. Staff, students, parents and former school governors held the view that the school's underperformance was due to long-term neglect by Westminster council. During the process of Pimlico's change to an academy, the council argued that the borough's community education needs could be sufficiently served by preserving the existing community school status of Quintin Kynaston School. However, since then QK switched to a community foundation school, meaning that there were no longer any community schools in Westminster akin to the traditional inner-city comprehensive.

The charity Future, set up by John and Caroline Nash, was chosen as the academy's sponsor in 2008. The chair of the trust, Nash was Parliamentary Under-Secretary of State for School System from January 2013 until September 2017. In 2010 the school received a Grade 1 'Outstanding' rating from Ofsted. No further full inspection has been undertaken since.

In 2015, a freedom of information request revealed that Pimlico Academy, Paddington Academy and Westminster Academy were given £2 million of extra non-refundable funding to balance their budgets, 3 of 22 nationally sharing £12.6 million. Pimlico deficit funding between 2011 and 2013, was £1 million: schools are not allowed to run a deficit budget.

=== Primary school controversy ===
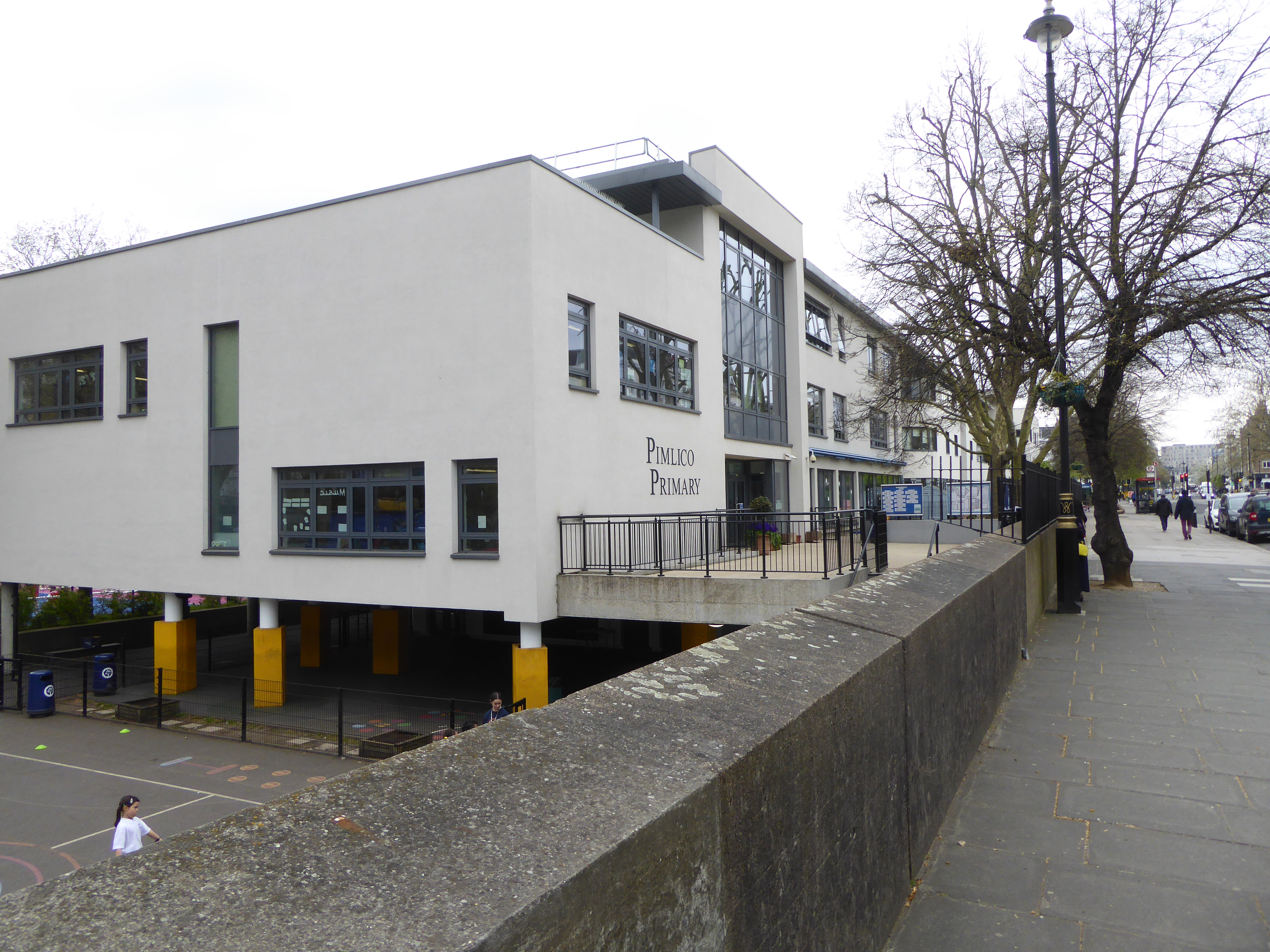
The Pimlico Primary Academy

In 2013 Labour councillors called for an inquiry after the new Pimlico primary school where Nash was co-chairman of the governors appointed an unqualified teacher as headmistress ahead of its opening with 60 pupils in September. Further criticism followed when she resigned after four weeks in the job. The school said that the headmistress had successfully set up the school and wished to pursue other opportunities.

=== Jo Nash controversy ===
In 2016, discussing issues raised by deregulation of the education sector, the National Union of Teachers cited Future Academies after Nash's daughter Jo, unqualified as a teacher, was given an unpaid teaching position at Pimlico Academy. An Oxford University history graduate, Jo Nash had previously worked in the office of the Tory minister Iain Duncan Smith; she joined Future as an unqualified teacher and as an adviser to help design the trust's history curriculum and recruit teachers.

=== Student, staff and parent protests ===
Daniel Smith, formerly a deputy at Ebbsfleet Academy, who was appointed headteacher in September 2020, made a series of unpopular changes to the school ethos, syllabus and uniform code and flew a Union Flag in the grounds, which some opposed.

Students expressed concern that the school's revised syllabus taught too little about Black history and that a strict appearance policy banning colourful hijabs and hairstyles which "block the view of others" was racist.

The students signed a petition of no confidence in Smith's leadership, and one member of staff referred to the matter in a resignation letter. Parents said that the changes did not reflect the education they had chosen for their children.

By March 2021, relations between staff and leading trust members were said to have deteriorated, resulting in protests in which students tore down and burned the Union flag. A slogan was painted reading: "there is no black in the Union Jack".

On 31 March, students staged a protest (which was falsely said to be a walkout) and gathered in the playground with those parents and teachers who supported them. The trust's chief executive, the headteacher and the vice principal met representatives of the students and agreed to all their demands. When Smith addressed the staff, the following day, he said he was using the Easter break to reflect on the changes: there were cries of "Leave". It was revealed that in the no-confidence vote, 85 members of staff had voted for the motion which resulted in a 99% vote of no-confidence, and 98% had voted to proceed to industrial action.

To start the new term, Smith issued letters to students involved in the protest threatening them with expulsion. This followed a warning letter sent out to all parents, by Lord Nash, Chair of Future Academies the previous Wednesday: "We must particularly ensure that our students, your children, understand the consequences of any future disobedience, which will undoubtedly result in disciplinary action."

'They want to expel the students for speaking out' and 'Expel the Racist Headmaster' were graffitied in support of the students on the wall on Sunday night.

Several MPs wrote a letter to the headteacher on 19 April, expressing their concern about possible action against children who had taken part in the protest.

Sir Michael Wilshaw, the former chief inspector of schools in England (2012-2016), was drafted in by Future Academies to support Smith.

Smith announced his resignation on 18 May 2021. Tony Oulton succeeded him on 31 May.

== Buildings ==
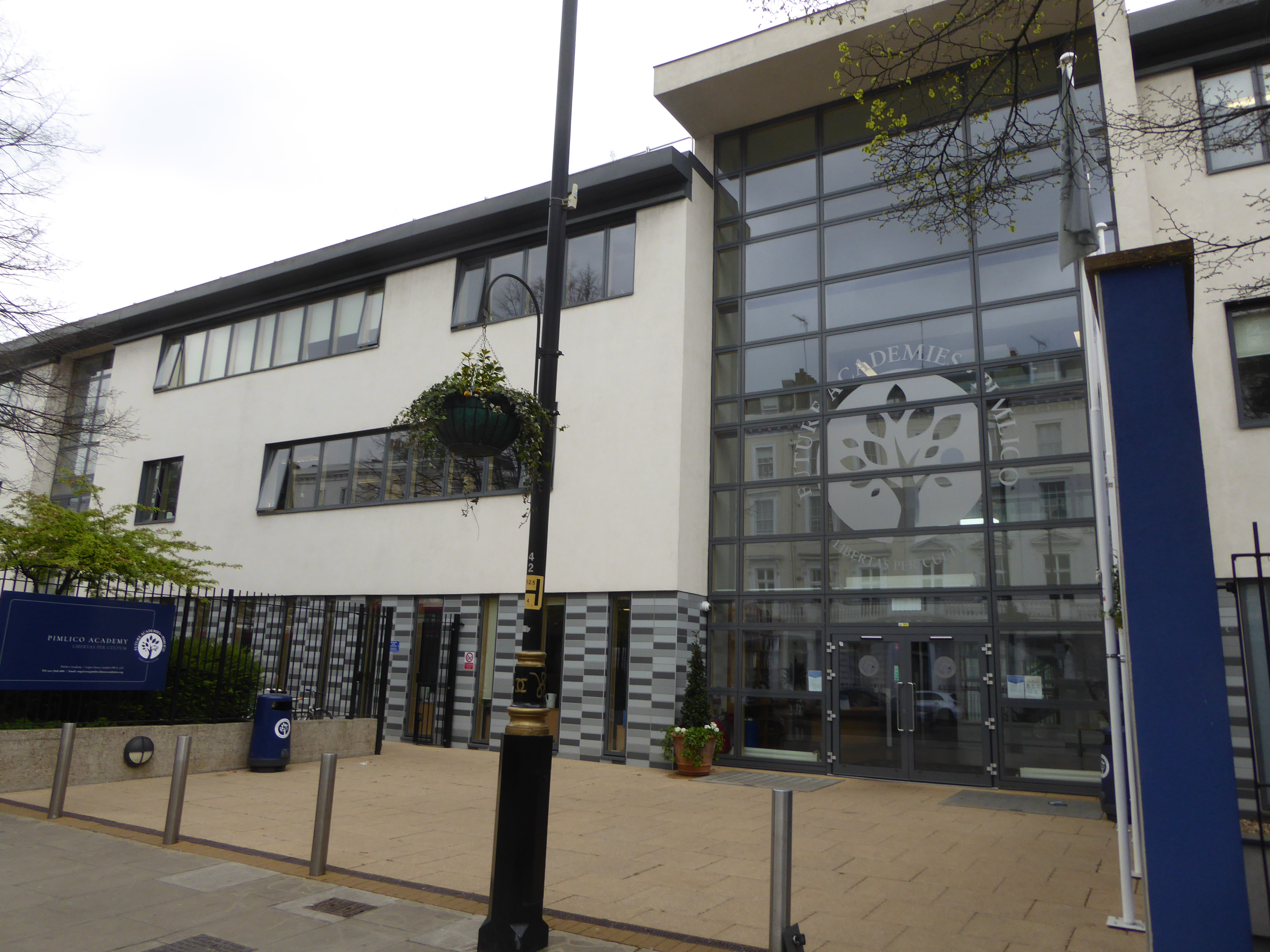
The main Lupus Street entrance to the academy in 2021

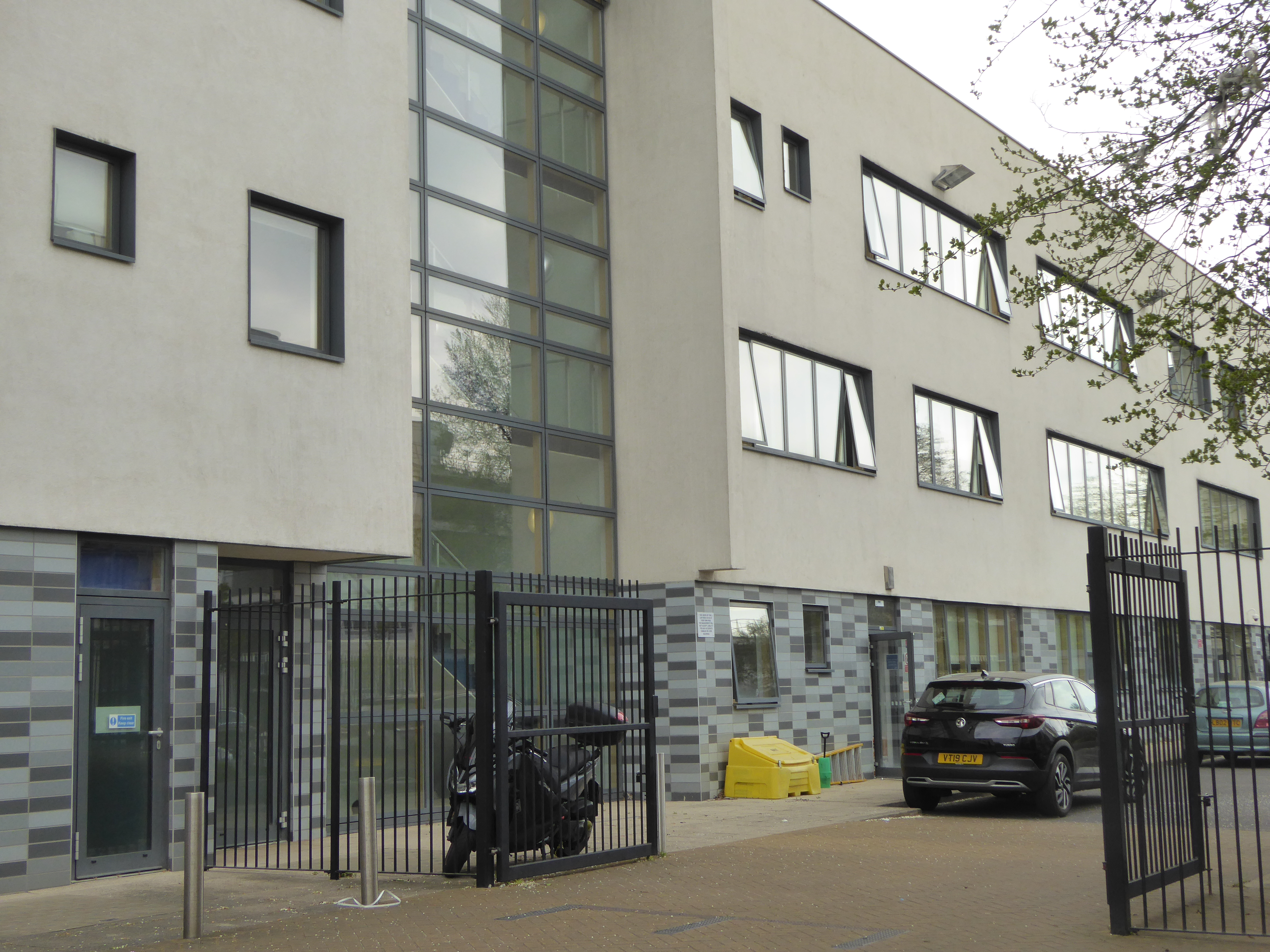
The Claverton Street elevation in 2021

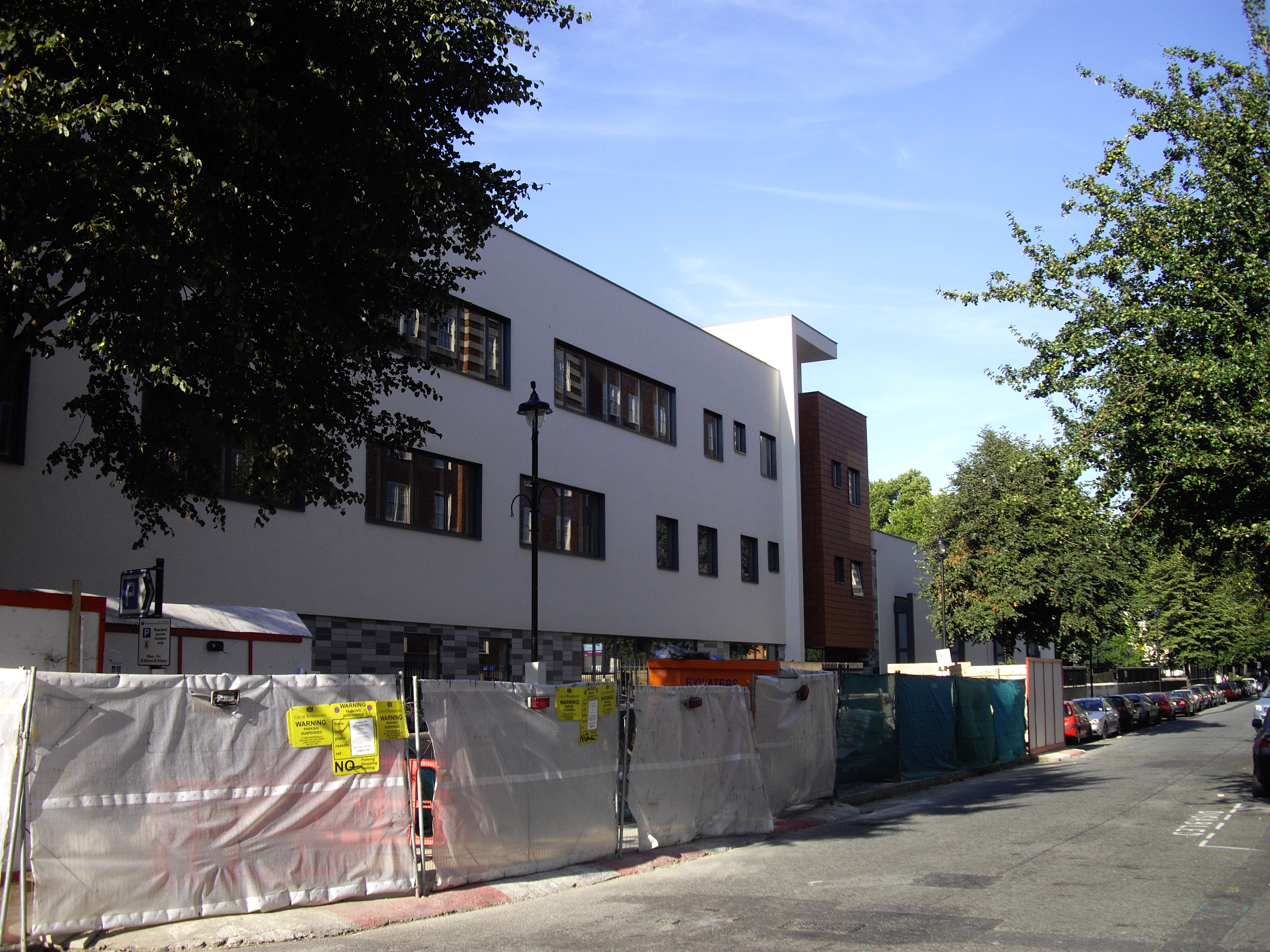
The Chichester Street elevation, nearing completion in 2009

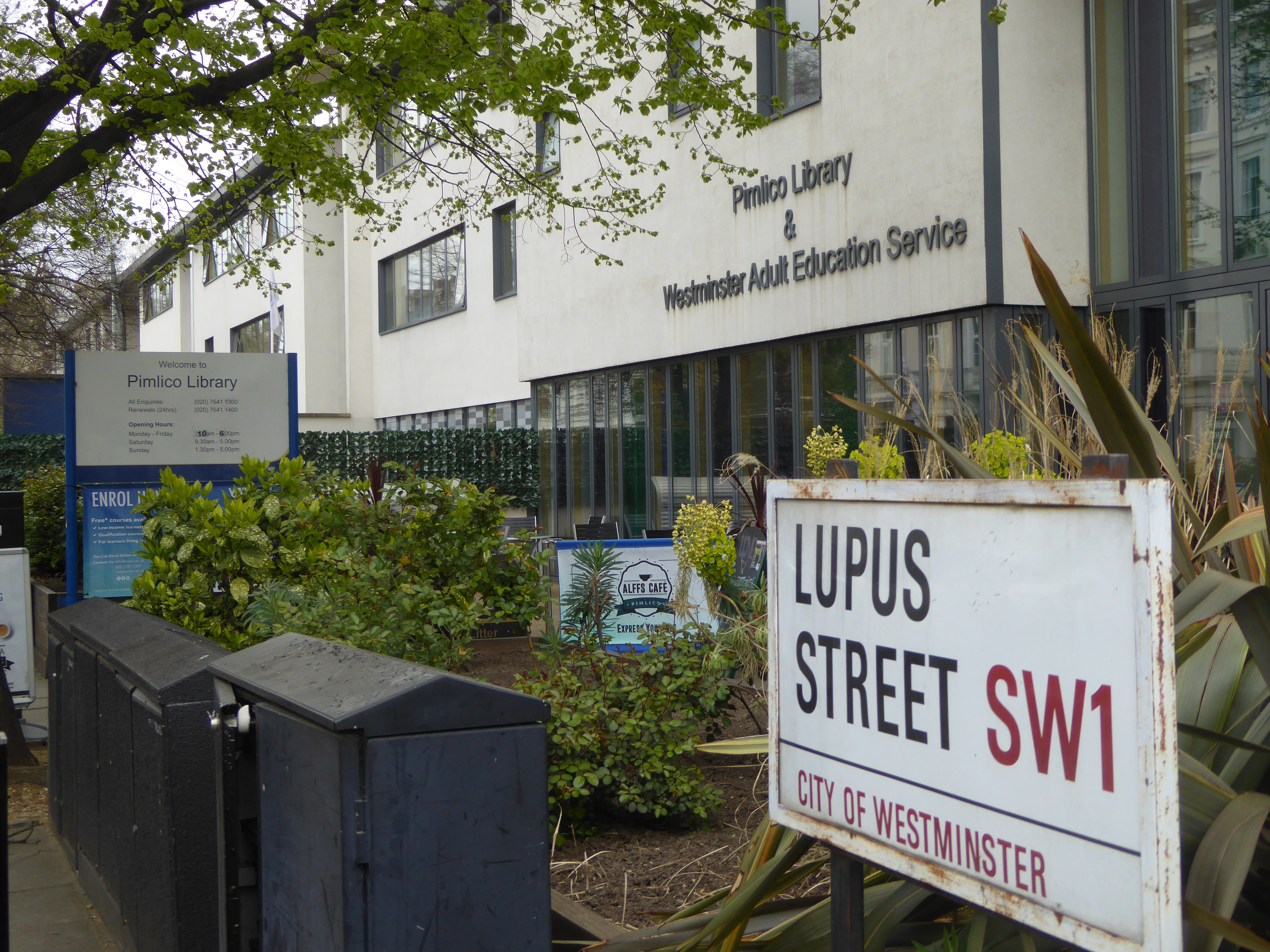
The Library Entrance

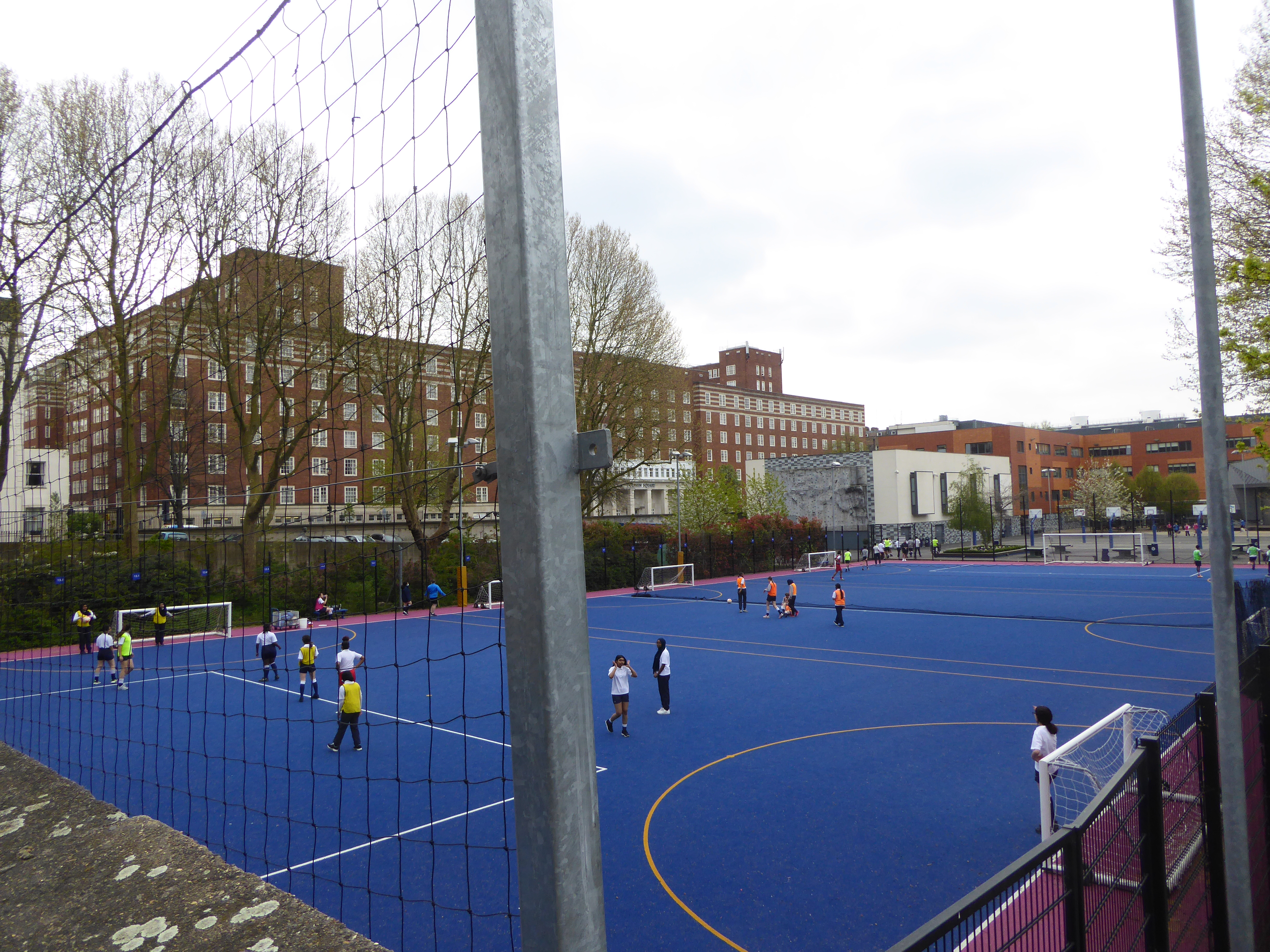
The sports pitches- with school yard, gyms and main school behind, Dolphin House to the left.

The school was rebuilt between 2008 and 2011 to a design by Architecture PLB as part of the Building Schools for the Future initiative. The design was for a school of total capacity of 1262, that is a Key Stage 3/ Key Stage 4 five form entry secondary school (1050), a 200 place sixth-form and a 12 place special unit. It included a local library and a base for Westminster Adult Education Service. The contract with Westminster City Council was valued at £20m. It was constructed by Bouygues.

=== Architectural history ===
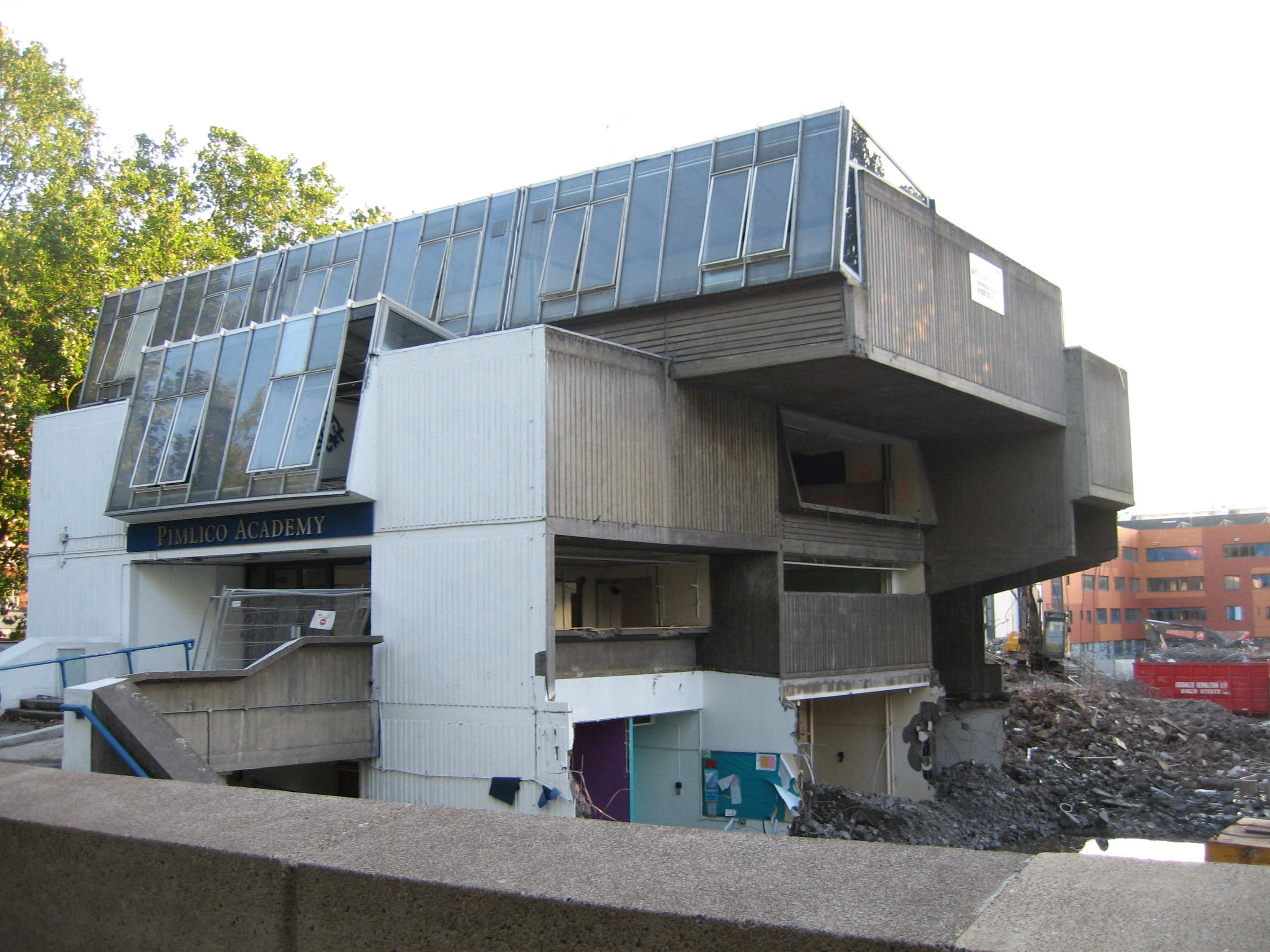
The final section of Bancroft's 1970 building to be demolished, with new academy in background

The previous school building was designed by John Bancroft of the Greater London Council's architecture department and was built in 1967–70. It was a noted example of brutalist architecture, constructed of concrete and glass without decorative claddings or ornament, and its appearance had been controversial since it opened. A contemporary critic likened it to a battleship, describing it as a "100-odd metre long, turreted, metallic grey thing lying in its own sunken rectangle".

Over time, deterioration of the building's fabric and drawbacks of its glass construction led to complaints that the building was often excessively hot in the summer and very cold in winter. Council authorities also expressed concern that the building's seventeen exits and entrances made it difficult to secure the site, and that the site lacked disabled access.

In the face of opposition from the Twentieth Century Society, and that of prominent architects and critics including Richard Rogers, RIBA president Sunand Prasad, Stephen Bayley, and John McAslan, the last remaining part of the old building was demolished in summer 2010.

== Notable former pupils ==
- Tammy Abraham, footballer
- Elisha Carter, chef
- Leo Chambers, footballer, West Ham United F.C.
- Matthew Freud, public relations executive
- Mo Gilligan, comedian
- Julian Gray, footballer
- Suzanna Hamilton, actress
- Patrick Harrington, politician in the National Front (1979-1989) and currently Third Way (UK) think-tank. General secretary of Solidarity – The Union for British Workers
- Michael Harvey, Jr (aka Harvey (MC)), musician and actor
- Elly Jackson, member of pop duo La Roux
- Amy Jenkins, novelist and screenwriter
- Alan Johnson, Labour Party politician and former Home Secretary.
- Toby Mott, artist and designer.
- Johnny Rogan, author
- Thomas Sangster, actor
- Frank Sinclair, footballer for Chelsea and Leicester City
- Rodney Smith (aka Roots Manuva), musician
- Will Straw, British policy researcher and Labour Party politician
- Abigail Thaw, actor
- Steve Walsh, disc jockey
- Ashley Walters (aka Asher D), musician [So Solid Crew] and actor
- Alyy Khan, Actor

== Academic and financial performance ==
As of the 2017/18 academic year, Ofsted rated the school's performance as Outstanding; with the financial balance for the school being reported at -£369.6k on a turnover of £9.7m.
