= The Grange Academy, Bushey =

The Grange Academy

Location
- London Road; Bushey, Hertfordshire, WD23 3AA; England; 51.6465°N 0.3698°W

Information
- Type: Academy
- Local authority: Hertfordshire
- Trust: Future Academies
- Department for Education URN: 147785 Tables
- Ofsted: Reports
- Principal: Aziza Ajak
- Gender: Co-educational
- Age: 11 to 18
- Website: https://www.thegrange.futureacademies.org/

The Grange Academy is a co-educational secondary school and sixth form located in Bushey in the English county of Hertfordshire.

== History ==
The school descends from a technical school in Watford, while the site it now occupies was originally a private junior boarding school.

Watford was a local pioneer in technical education, restructuring its School of Art, Science and Commerce in 1922, and establishing a Junior Technical School in the old public library building on Queen's Road in 1929. In the following year, these were brought together in the Watford Technical School, with an annexe to the old library building opened by Lord Eustace Percy, an advocate of technical education. Inspectors praised the school in 1934 for its high employment rate among the skilled trades. It became a prestigious selective school, though behind Watford Grammar School for Boys and Watford Grammar School for Girls. Ambitious expansion plans were drawn up by the county council, but were shelved on the outbreak of the Second World War. In 1958 the Watford Technical High School moved to cheaply constructed buildings on the north side of Bushey Hall Road. The Queen's Road site has since been demolished to make way for the Harlequin Shopping Centre. When the school became a comprehensive in 1971, it was renamed Bushey Hall School. The new school was simply a continuation of its predecessor, with no change in students, staff, and no special measures. Both road and school were named after the original Bushey Hall, which was located just to the north on Aldenham Road, and is now the site of a leisure centre and golf course.

The school relocated to the London Road site in 1988, with September 1988 marked as the inaugural year for pupils at the new site. The buildings at the old Bushey Hall Road site remained derelict for 4 years before being demolished following a drowning in the old swimming pool. A housing estate and caravan site now occupy the Bushey Hall Road site.

=== The London Road site ===
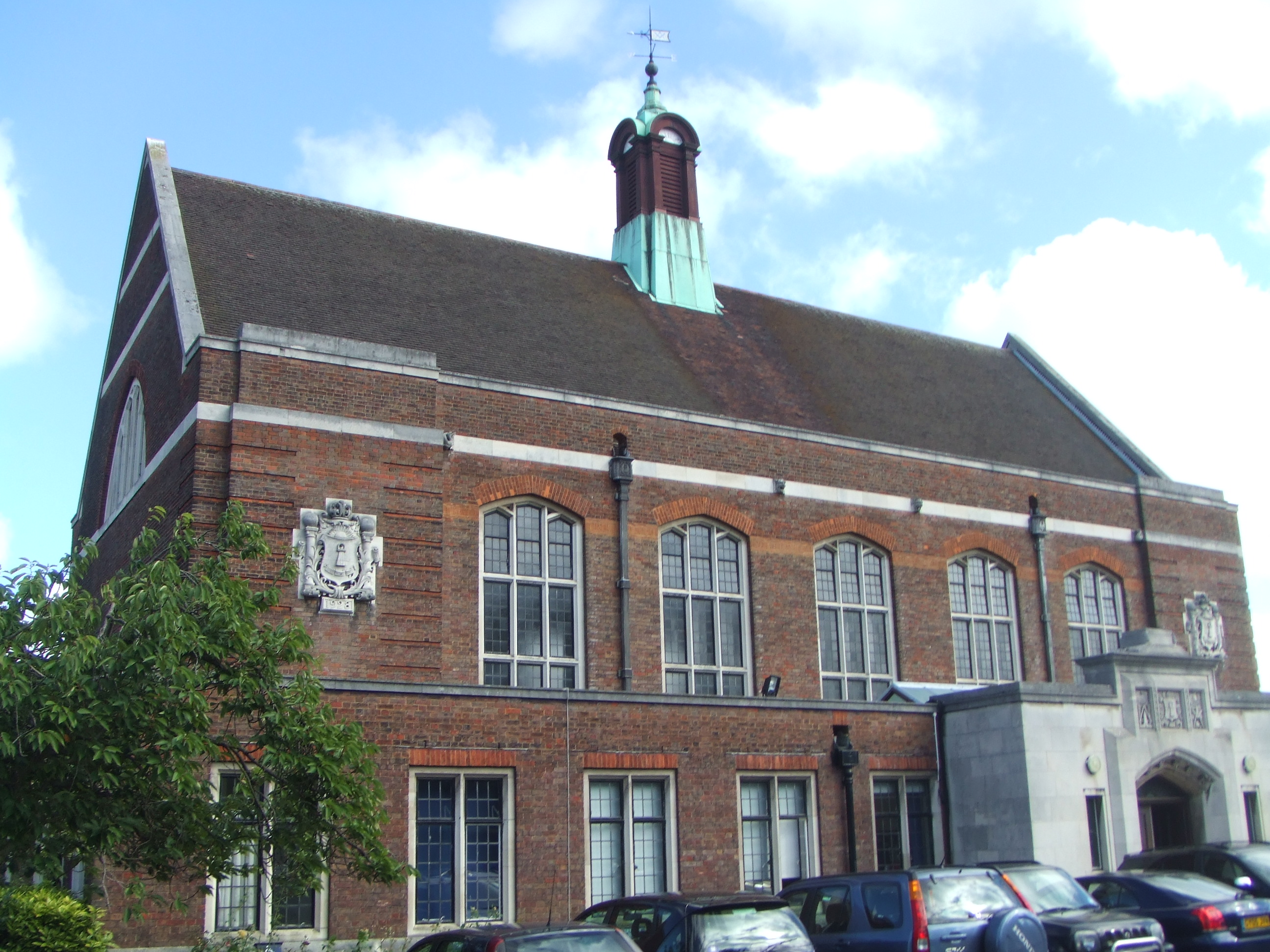
The main hall, with masonic markings

The current site is the location of the former Bushey Manor. The buildings were erected in 1928 to house the Royal Masonic School for Boys junior school, which opened in the following year. The school was designed to house 400 boarders in a line of four buildings connected by a cloister (covered walkway), across the quadrangle from the main building. The other buildings on the quadrangle were the dining hall (on the east side) and the teaching block and library (west).

Due to falling rolls, the junior school closed in 1970. The site was then home to Grange Park School (a secondary school for boys) until it closed in 1987, when Bushey Hall School moved to the site.

The building still bears evidence of its masonic heritage in the architectural detailing. The brick pillars to the main gate on London Road are topped with stone globes, unusually a lunar globe and oceanic globe. These relate closely with other celestial detailing on the site; in the main entrance hall a stained glass roof dome is marked with the 12 signs of the zodiac. Other masonic markings can be found on the stone lintels over significant doorways.

Bushey School attained grant maintained status in the mid-1990s, converting to a foundation school when grant maintained status was abolished in 1999. The library was replaced in 1993 with the construction of a learning resource centre on the green space beside the gymnasium hall. An arson attack in 1994 destroyed the gymnasium roof and it was closed due to lack of funds to replace the heavy timber trusses. A temporary structure was built on the playing fields as a replacement gymnasium.

Since to the introduction of partial selection in several other schools in southwest Hertfordshire in mid-1990s, the school's intake has been skewed toward the lower end of the ability range. Results at the school have been poor for several years and the school was placed in special measures in April 2008 following an Ofsted inspection in March 2008. As part of its improvement measures the school then applied for academy status.

=== Academy ===
The school converted to academy status in September 2009 and was renamed The Bushey Academy. The academy was originally sponsored by the David Meller Educational Trust and relocated to new buildings in January 2013. Jon Hebblethwaite was appointed as the school Principal in April 2017.

In April 2018 the school was rated 'Inadequate' by Ofsted. As a consequence of this the school became sponsored by Future Academies in February 2020 and was later renamed The Grange Academy. The current Principal, Dr Philip Hills, was appointed in July 2020.
