= Cavendish School, Hemel Hempstead =

Community school in Hertfordshire, England

The Cavendish School

Location
- Warners End Road; Hemel Hempstead, Hertfordshire, HP1 3DW; England; 51°45′27″N 0°29′00″W

Information
- Type: Community school
- Motto: Committed to achieving our personal best
- Established: 1959
- Closed: 2018
- Local authority: Hertfordshire
- Department for Education URN: 117528 Tables
- Ofsted: Reports
- Executive headteacher: Gary Lewis
- Gender: Coeducational
- Age: 11 to 18
- Enrolment: 1198
- Website: http://www.cavendish.herts.sch.uk

The Cavendish School was a secondary school in Hemel Hempstead, Hertfordshire that first opened in 1959 as a grammar school, becoming a comprehensive school in 1970. It was named after the University of Cambridge's Cavendish Laboratory. The Cavendish School closed in 2018 and reopened as Laureate Academy.

== History ==
Cavendish Grammar School opened on 8 September 1959 in buildings of the Warner's End School (later the John F Kennedy Catholic School) with 72 pupils and five staff led by founding headmaster Arthur Hayward. In 1961, pupils and staff moved into partially completed buildings on the present site, which was visited in March 1962 by Minister of Education David Eccles. The school was officially opened in June 1962 by Sir Nevill Mott, a professor of physics at the University of Cambridge's Cavendish Laboratory, after which the school was named, with one of the school's houses being named after Mott himself. One of the first of the new breed of post-war technical grammar schools, it was initially run along very traditional lines by Hayward.

In 1967 the school Sixth Form Centre was established at The Lockers.

In 1968 the school pioneered a system of learning away from traditional subject structure: the new intake that year studied 'Inter-disciplinary Enquiry' (IDE) for the first two years in place of English, Geography, History and Science. Maths and languages were taught separately. IDE was very quickly seen as a 'conspicuous failure'. The school quickly gained a reputation for innovation and modern curricula, being one of the first in the area to pioneer the Nuffield Physics syllabus, SMP for Mathematics and introducing computer studies, including the first school link to the Hatfield Polytechnic mainframe computer.

The 1969 intake was the last grammar year, and from 1970 the school became a comprehensive school, the Cavendish School. Hayward moved to Bodmin School the following year. When he died in June 2010, tributes were published in the local Hemel Hempstead newspaper.

In 1975 the Under 16s boys basketball team won the national championship. In 1977 the Under 19s girls basketball team won the national championship.

After a 2005 inspection, the school was described as 'inadequate' by Ofsted, but was rated 'satisfactory' in 2007. In 2016, Cavendish School was one of two Hemel Hempstead schools rated by Ofsted as 'Requires Improvement'. With the school ranked 'well below average' for its GCSE results, a new executive headteacher was appointed in early 2017 to try to transform the school's performance. However, a May 2017 Ofsted inspection again rated the school as 'inadequate', and it was placed in special measures. In March 2018, school governors proposed that Cavendish School be taken over by Future Academies, an organisation already running five London schools.

In 2018, the Cavendish School closed and reopened as Laureate Academy.

== Forms ==
As was traditional in grammar schools, Year 7-11 pupils were originally divided into four houses. Each was named after famous scientists from the Cavendish Laboratory at the University of Cambridge, These houses were used for administrative purposes, for competitions such as sports day and to work out which form has the best attendance. After the school converted from Grammar to Comprehensive the house system and names were retained but were referred to as 'forms' from then on. In the sixth form (years 12–13) students were redistributed into forms linked to a sixth form tutor, a member of staff, and the forms were named after the teacher concerned e.g. 6 Dean, or 6 Kilanyi.

The four original houses were:

- Maxwell
- Rutherford
- Rayleigh
- Thompson

Two more were added to cope with larger intake of pupils

- Bragg
- Mott, who opened the school in 1962

A seventh form, Pippard, was introduced in 1990.

The school adopted the modern year group naming convention of Year 7-13 in 1991.

A further form, Franklin, was introduced in 2017.

As of 2010, Year 7-13 were divided into five houses, still named after scientists. These included:

- Bragg (Green)
- Maxwell (Red)
- Rutherford (Blue)
- Thompson (Yellow)
- Franklin (Orange, introduced in 2017)

Each house had a colour, the students had two striped lines on their tie one before the little logo and one after.

== Uniform ==
Original uniform from school opening in 1959:

Girls: Winter: Long sleeved white blouse, Purple black and gold striped tie, Grey Terylene pleated skirt, Grey cardigan, Grey knickers, Black shoes, Long grey socks, Purple beret, Grey gabardine mac; Summer: Purple and white striped dress, Grey cardigan, Purple blazer with Cavendish crest, Grey knickers, Brown sandals, White ankle socks, Straw hat with purple band and tassels

Boys: Winter and summer: Purple blazer (summer or winter) with Cavendish crest, White long sleeved shirts, Purple, black and gold striped tie, Grey flannel trousers, Purple cap, Grey long sleeved pullover (summer: short sleeved), Grey gabardine ‘mac, Black shoes (summer: black or brown sandals), Long grey socks

== Music and drama ==
Cavendish had a reputation for music and drama. Its productions and concerts included The Down-Going of Orpheus Hawkins, Godspell, Dark Side of the Moon and Volpone.

== Notable alumni ==
- Brandon Austin, footballer
- Colin Edwin, bass guitarist with Porcupine Tree
- Alan Lee (cricket writer), racing correspondent from 1999 to 2015 for The Times
- Jez Moxey, sports administrator
- Jonny Phillips, actor who played Charles Lightoller in Titanic
- Dan Sarginson, rugby player
- Jo Shapcott, poet, winner of the National Poetry Competition in 1985 and 1991
- Claire Skinner, actress who starred in the TV sitcom Outnumbered
- Maggie Snowling, Professor in the Department of Experimental Psychology, University of Oxford and currently President of St John's College, Oxford
- David Vanian (David Lett), lead singer of The Damned
- Steven Wilson, musician
- Harry Winks, footballer
