= England school census =

Statutory data collection for state schools in England

The School Census is a statutory data collection for all maintained (state-funded) schools in England. This includes nursery, primary, secondary, middle-deemed primary, middle-deemed secondary, local authority maintained special and non-maintained special schools, academies including free schools, studio schools and university technical colleges and city technology colleges. Service children's education schools also participate on a voluntary basis. Schools that are entirely privately funded are not included. It is a statutory obligation for schools to complete the census and schools must ask parents for information, tell parents and pupils where data are optional, and tell them what it will be used for before submitting it to Local Authorities or Department for Education. There is no obligation for parents or children to provide all of the data.

The census dataset contains approximately eight million records per year and includes variables on the pupil's personal data, including name, home postcode, gender, age, ethnicity, special educational needs, free school meals eligibility, as well as educational history and attainment results. The census also sends sensitive data to the Department for Education, such as absence, exclusions and their reasons, indicators of armed forces or linked to indicators of children in care. The data collected on children from age 2–19, three times a year, creates a "lifetime school record" of characteristics, testing and tracking, to form a single longitudinal record over time. This single central view of a child's personal confidential data and their educational achievement, behaviours and personal characteristics, is core to the National Pupil Database, a linked database controlled by the Department for Education.

The data collected for each individual pupil is listed in the National Pupil Database User Guide.

Data is retained indefinitely and in December 2015, the National Pupil Database contained 19,807,973 individual pupil records on a named basis.

It is "one of the richest education datasets in the world" according to the National Pupil Database (NPD) User Guide.

The school census expansion in 2016 to collect nationality data, first reported on in June 2016 in Schools Week, caused controversy.

== History and coverage ==
Prior to 2007, the Schools Census dataset was known as the Pupil Level Annual Schools Census (PLASC). Comprehensive PLASC data was first collected in 2002, including individual pupil names.

MPs in the House of Commons were assured on the changes to the "Central Pupil Database" in 2002 by then Minister of State for Education and Skills, Stephen Timms, that, "The Department has no interest in the identity of individual pupils as such, and will be using the database solely for statistical purposes, with only technical staff directly engaged in the data collation process having access to pupil names."

== Frequency ==
The School Census is submitted by schools on a termly basis, in three collections each school year. The on-roll "school census day" dates and the submission deadlines are determined by the Department for Education. The first is the Autumn School Census in October, the main collection is Spring Census collected in January when the Early Years Census is also collected, and the final of the academic year is the Summer School Census collected in May. The separate Key Stage attainment datasets are updated yearly.

== School census expansion 2016–17 and nationality data controversy ==
In 2016 the British government passed legislation to expand the school census to include the country of birth, nationality, and first language of every child.

On 31 October 2016, the House of Lords agreed after debate, with the regret motion on the expansion of the collection of pupil data:

That this House regrets that information about pupils' nationality and country of birth collected under the Education (Pupil Information) (England) (Miscellaneous Amendments) Regulations 2016 (Statutory Instrument 2016/808) could be used to help determine a child's immigration status.

=== When the expansion was announced ===
The Department for Education had instructed schools to collect the new data beginning with the autumn census in October 2016. Many schools began collecting the new data before the school summer term 2016 ended, causing confusion and controversy. This expansion was to add to the data already collected, as listed in the Common basic data set (CBDS). and included further changes to existing items such as ethnicity and a unique property identifier:

- country of birth (Pupil country of birth, item 100565) added
- ethnicity and nationality, expanded to all children regardless of age (Nationality, 100564)
- multi-level detail expanded on English as an additional language, coded in five tiers
- pupil home address may automatically add a unique property identifier using BS7666 address format, in addition to the 5-line home address, and in addition to postcode which is already mandatory
- age of pupil from which data may be collected lowered to under 2, and previous restrictions on collecting ethnicity on under 5s were scrapped

Country of birth, nationality, first language, and ethnicity are all optional and can be returned as 'refused', 'not yet obtained', or 'not known'.

==== Legal changes and purposes ====
The new collection was enabled through secondary legislation, known as a Statutory Instrument (SI). The Education (Pupil Information) (England) (Miscellaneous Amendments) Regulations 2016 / 808 was laid before Parliament on 27 July 2016 and came into effect on 1 September 2016. This was during both parliamentary and school summer holidays and went without debate or scrutiny until after it came into effect.

In two parliamentary written questions (42842 and 42942) in July 2016, Nick Gibb MP, Schools Minister denied that the new data would be shared with other Government departments. "The data will be collected solely for the Department's internal use for the analytical, statistical and research purposes described above. There are currently no plans to share the data with other government departments unless we are legally required to do so. The Department have not consulted directly with parents regarding the changes to the school census."

In a July article, on the LSE Parenting for a Digital Future blog it was noted that, "There are no published plans how these data would facilitate targeting any support and this data item is not required for funding."

==== Concerns ====
Campaigners were worried that some newspapers may use it to stigmatise schools attended by migrant children. Regional data have since been disclosed in 2017 into the public domain, to individuals, through Freedom of Information requests. Campaign groups, parents and teachers also warned that these data may be used for immigration enforcement purposes.

Over 20 organisations signed a letter in September 2016, to Justine Greening, calling on the Secretary of State for Education to reverse the policy of using school census data for immigration enforcement purposes, and the collection of nationality and country of birth at national level, and to commit to protecting all children from stigma, xenophobia, and violence. Under the coalition of Against Borders for Children, formed in September 2016; parents, teachers and campaigners began a national boycott of the expanded data collection in September 2016, supported by national human rights organisations, under the hashtag #BoycottSchoolCensus calling on schools and parents to refuse, retract, and resist the nationality data collection.

On 6 October 2016, a Freedom of Information request revealed that Education officials already had an agreement in place since July 2015 to share the personal details of up to 1,500 school children a month with the Home Office, for a range of Border Force purposes under section 24 or 24A of the Immigration Act 1971, or section 35 of the Asylum and Immigration (Treatment of Claimants) Act 2004.

The National Union of Teachers, called for this use of pupil data by the HO to end, emphasising that "schools are not part of policing immigration". "Furthermore, we disapprove of the way in which information has been released from the National Pupil Database without informed consent. Government needs to ensure that use is consent based – again, so that relations between schools and parents are not compromised."

==== Intentions revealed ====
The original Memorandum of Understanding outlined an agreement to transfer individual confidential data including "Nationality (once collected)" from up to 1,500 children a month from school census data at the Department for Education to the Home Office Removals Casework team. Data handed over includes home address, school address, name, gender and date of birth from up to the last 5 years of the pupil record. This agreement had been in place since July 2015, and before the census expansion was announced publicly in May 2016, and before the law was changed to permit nationality data collection effective from September 2016. The new version of the agreement, amended from 7 October 2016, removed the reference to nationality data. The existence of the agreements did not become public knowledge until published by the magazine Schools Week in December, and available on whatdotheyknow in February 2017. The agreement states that there is no legal requirement to share these data between departments.

This intended purpose was never included in the explanation given to schools, why the school census had been expanded to start collecting nationality data from children.

Corporate Watch note in the report of April 2017, that, "The memorandum states directly that it aims to: "create a hostile environment for those who seek to benefit from the abuse of immigration control." (Section 15.1.2).

On 10 October 2016 the Secretary-of-State, Justine Greening, had insisted in Education Questions that the collection of nationality data was; 'about making sure we have the right data and evidence to develop strong policy."

The extent of secret Home Office policy to access to pupil's home address was made public for the first time on 27 October 2016 in answer to a parliamentary question 48635 by Nick Gibb, School Standards Minister with a responsibility for education data. "Between July 2015 and September 2016 […] requests relating to a total of 2,462 individuals have been made by the Home Office to DfE and 520 records have been identified within DfE data and returned to the Home Office."

In December it was revealed through the publication of information in Cabinet Office letters leaked to the BBC, that it had decided in 2015 that nationality and country of birth would be collected from school children as a compromise, and that the then Education Secretary had to "fend off" more stringent Home Office plans to refuse school places of choice to migrant children, and to require passport data collection from every child in England.

==== Outcome ====
In November 2016, in a government u-turn, the collection of nationality and country of birth was scrapped for the planned January 2017 Early Years Census, and not collected on children age 2–5 in non-school establishments in the January spring census 2017. It went ahead for 90% of children aged 19 and under, collected via the School Census.

Lord Nash told the House of Lords that the nationality data would be optional, and that parents could now retract it, if previously submitted.

"If parents have previously provided this information to schools and now wish to retract it, they should inform the school of this decision. For such cases, schools can update their systems to show a parent has refused to provide the information and this will be collected within the next school census."

He also wrote to fellow Lords that since the new data were "too sensitive" to be merged with the National Pupil Database and released, the Department for Education would hold the new information separately from other data. It was later confirmed in May 2017 via FOI that this was called the 'I-store'.

In January 2017, the Department for Education first told schools by email, and then in updated guidance, that parents and pupils could retract the data by using 'refused' in the nationality field, while it continues to be collected termly.

Many schools, and areas' guidance, fail to make clear to parents that the new data are optional, and are not required for funding. Home Office use of school pupil data continues, and schools have not been informed about this use of the data that schools submit in the school census, or change in Department policy.

The department has refused to confirm the total numbers of pupils' nationality data collected and refused, both via FOI and a Parliamentary Question.

Monthly releases of national pupil data from the school census to the Home Office Border Force Removals Casework Team continue in 2017 as per an ongoing agreement. The Department for Education released the Q1 2017 numbers of pupils' data transferred via a Freedom of Information request. The department declined to provide a requested audit report to show if and how newly collected nationality data is being used.

In October 2017, the Department for Education confirmed in an interview with Sky News that, information obtained from the National Pupil Database was used to contact families to "regularise their stay or remove them".

Campaigners continue to call for an end to the collection of nationality and country of birth data from pupils in the school census. and the human rights organisation, Liberty, is "interviewing parents and students affected so that we can challenge this toxic policy in the courts."

== Use of pupil level data ==
A wide range of aggregate outputs including official statistics are published on a regular basis, including anonymous statistics and open data. The Department for Education (DfE) publishes school-level attainment statistics for England as part of its online Performance Tables alongside wider contextual information about the setting in which schools operate.

The School Census contains data which are identifying, and too sensitive or disclosive to be published, but these data are given out to third parties in raw form. The pupil level data are personal and include sensitive personal data as defined by the Data Protection Act 1998. The data items are classed into four tiers by the Department for Education.

David Cameron announced in 2011, the government would be "opening up access to anonymised data from the National Pupil Database […]."

Since 2012, the Secretary of State has powers to share raw data from National Pupil Database under terms and conditions with named bodies and third parties who meet the Approved Persons criteria of the 2009 Prescribed Persons Act, updated in 2012/13.

Releases of the data since 2012 to third parties have not been anonymous, but have been of identifiable and highly sensitive (Tier 1), identifiable and sensitive (Tier 2), aggregated but may be identifying due to small numbers (Tier 3) and identifying non-sensitive items (Tier 4). Raw, closed data are released on a regular basis to third parties, and the majority of releases are of Tier 1 and 2 data. In January 2017, a parliamentary question showed nearly 400 requests for identifying data, have been approved for release each year since 2012.

Access is granted through an applications process to the Department for Education internal Data Management Advisory Panel (DMAP), and is subject to requesters complying with terms and conditions imposed under contractual licence arrangements. The DMAP Terms of Reference was first published in July 2016. There is no ethics committee review for the release of data directly from the National Pupil Database. The sensitive and identifying items that require DMAP approval include name, date of birth, postcode, candidate numbers, Pupil Matching Reference (Non Anonymised), detailed types of disability, indicators of adoption from care, reasons for exclusions (theft, violence, alcohol etc.).

A list of completed National Pupil Database Third Party Requests and those in the pipeline, are published on a quarterly retrospective basis.

Government uses of the data are based on a model of data sharing which is viewed by some as 'obsolete'. Intra departmental transfers of data include to the Cabinet Office for preparation of Electoral Registration Transformation work in 2013, to match participant data the National Citizen Service, and for use in the Troubled Families programme, as well as arm's length bodies such as NHS Digital for a survey "What About Youth" mailed home to 300,000 15 year olds in 2014. Not all government uses of the data are recorded in the Third Party Release register, notably police and Home Office use made public through Freedom of Information requests in 2016 and 2017, has been left out of the register, and remain undocumented (as of May 2017).

Of the documented 887 requests for identifiable data that have been through the DMAP request process in March 2012 – December 2016, only 29 have been for aggregated data, according to analysis by the NGO defenddigitalme. There were 15 rejected applications between March 2012 and September 2016, including a request "by mistake" from the Ministry of Defence to target its messaging for recruitment marketing. Approved uses include identifying and sensitive data released to Fleet Street papers, "to pick interesting cases/groups of students", and about 60% of applications approved for identifying and sensitive, pupil level data, were from think tanks, charities, and commercial companies.

In a presentation to the NPD User group in September 2016, Iain Bradley of the DfE Data Modernisation group acknowledged that the release of sensitive data: "People are accessing sensitive data, but only to then aggregate. The access to sensitive data is a means to an end to produce the higher level findings."

Academic uses of school census data make up about 40% of the requests for identifying, pupil level data, processed through and approved by the DMAP process. The raw data are sent to the requestor's own location. There is no charge made for fulfilling requests. "DfE does not charge for data (and has not since the NPD process began), nor does DfE charge for the processing and delivery of extracts to customers."

Public interest research use of pupil level data through other routes of access to the data, include projects linking individual data together with other education and employment data from citizens' interactions with other government departments and public services.

== Legal basis for the release of pupil level data by the Department for Education ==
The release of data permitting pupil level release of individuals' identifiable data to third parties was updated by 2013 changes to legislation. Section 114 of the Education Act 2005, and section 537A of the Education Act 1996, together with the 2009 Prescribed Persons Act, were amended in 2010 and 2013, to allow the release of individual children's data to third parties. Which data items are involved is based on the 2006 Act around the register data a school must hold, which has subsequently had many amendments.

Campaigners from the children's privacy NGO defenddigitalme, have questioned whether this legal basis is met for some releases between 2012 and 2017 from the National Pupil Database.

"The central concern is that parents and pupils themselves are not sufficiently aware of the way the data is being shared with third parties." "There appears to have been no concerted effort to bring the consultation or the NPD initiative to the attention of parents or pupils."
