= Four-Piece Composition: Reclining Figure =

Sculpture by Henry Moore

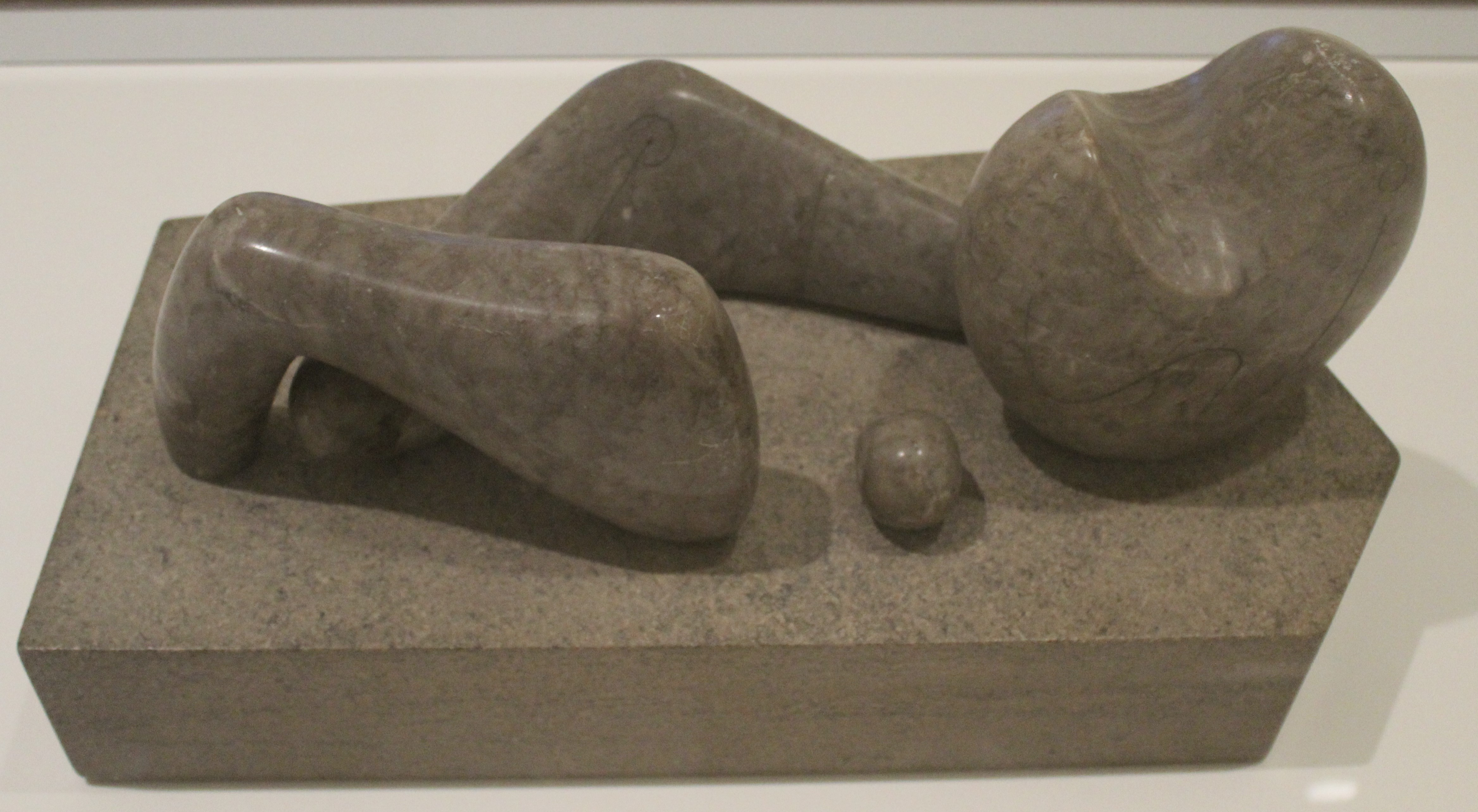
- Artist: Henry Moore
- Year: 1934
- Catalogue: LH 154
- Medium: Cumberland alabaster
- Dimensions: 50.8 cm (20.0 in)
- Location: Tate, London

Four-Piece Composition: Reclining Figure (LH154) is an important early stone sculpture by the English sculptor Henry Moore. He had been working on depictions of the reclining human figure since at least 1924, but this small piece, made in the latter half of 1934, is the first work in which Moore breaks a human figure down in to several separate pieces. It was acquired by the Tate Gallery in 1976.

== Background ==
Moore worked on the sculpture at his studio on Parkhill Road, in Hampstead, by directly carving the stone without making prior models, but rather simply responding to the material. Some of More's contemporaneous drawings display related themes, with several sheets of shapes evolved from separate body parts. Moore later explained that he "began separating forms from each other in order to be able to relate space and form together". The sculpture was not just the parts, but also how they were arranged, their relationships and the spaces between and around them.

== Description ==
The completed work measures 175 by 457 by 203 millimetres (6.9 in × 18.0 in × 8.0 in). It comprises four elements of polished Cumberland alabaster, a fine grained and soft form of opaque greyish gypsum with darker brownish mottling and veins. These four elements are arranged on a small block of Purbeck Marble, like a picture frame, but they do not touch each other. The individual elements are abstracted, but arranged together they become parts of a human figure; they were later described by Moore as a head, body, and leg, and a small piece that Moore called the umbilicus connecting the others together.

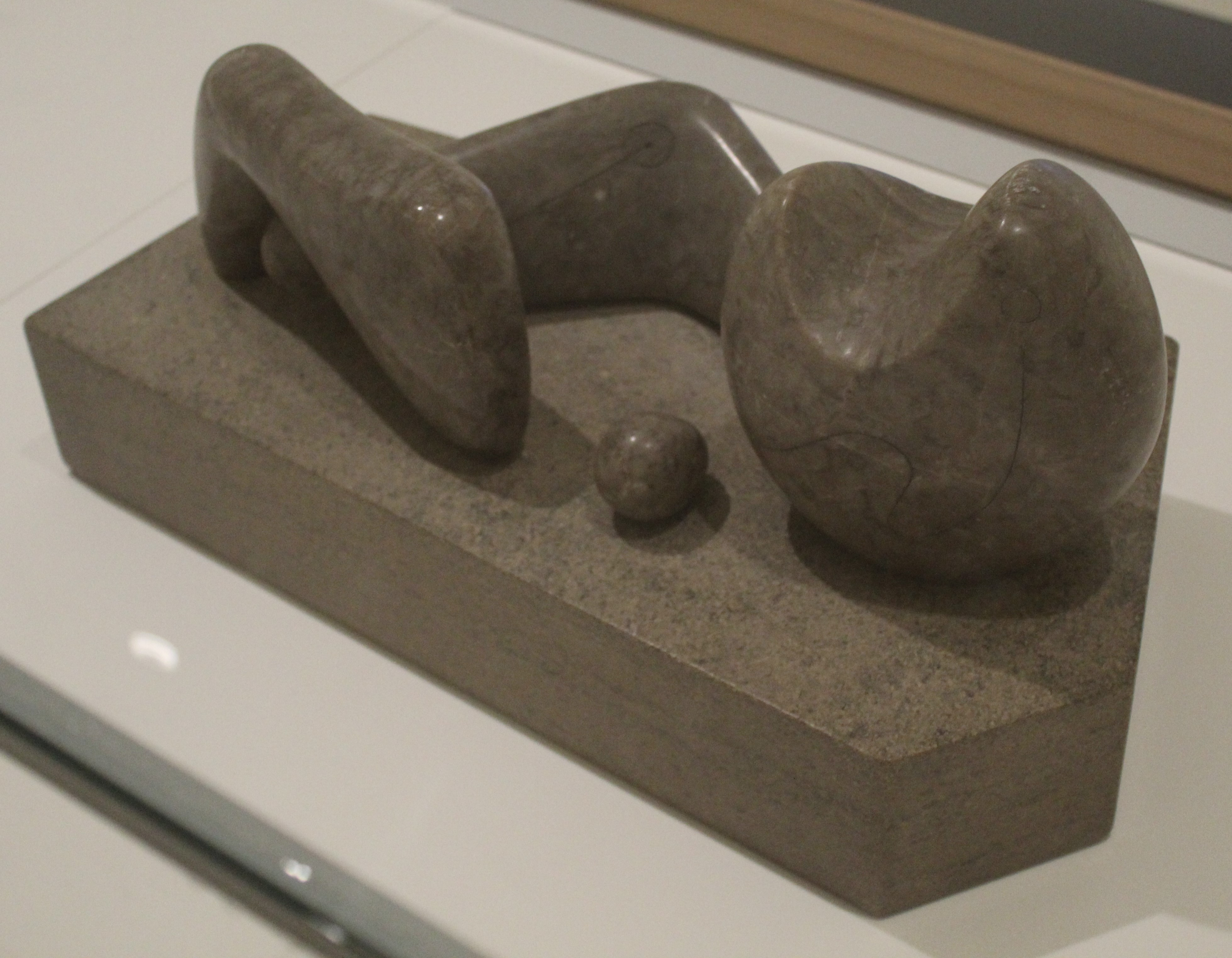
Four-Piece Composition: Reclining Figure, Tate Britain

Three elements are arranged in alignment: the head like a disc, with a large U-shaped notch to create a nose and mouth, or possibly arms and shoulders; the small rounded umbilicus like a pebble; and the leg, starting with a wider thigh or buttock and then narrowing through a knee bend. Then head has incised decoration of two differently sized circles, one perhaps an eye above the mouth-like notch, connected by a curved line. Behind these three pieces is the body, which curves underneath the leg; this piece can also be interpreted as a second leg. This element also has an incised circle linked to an incised straight line; the circle can be interpreted as a nipple or a second umbilicus. Moore later said the incised elements were inspired by Palaeolithic bone engravings, but some art critics have drawn links with the contemporaneous works of Ben Nicholson.

Some art critics have classified it as a surreal artwork, influenced by Pablo Picasso's 1928 drawing of a Project for a Monument, Alberto Giacometti's 1932 sculpture Woman with her throat cut, and works by Jean Arp or Joan Miró. Moore took photographs of the sculpture from four different angles in 1935–35, using dramatic raking light.

Moore returned to the theme of multi-part human figures the 1950s and 1960.

== Reception ==
The work was first exhibited at the Zwemmer Gallery in London, in October 1935. It did not find a buyer, and was exhibited with other works by Moore at the Leicester Galleries in 1936. It was included in a retrospective exhibition shown in New York, Chicago and San Francisco in 1946–47, and it was purchased by Lois Culver Orswell in December 1946 for $1,300. She exchanged it for a sculpture by Jacques Lipchitz in 1952, and it was still owned by the gallery of Curt Valentin on his death in 1954.

It was sold in 1955 to art dealer Martha Jackson, and retained until her death in 1969. The Purbeck marble base was replaced with black marble at some point before 1960, but Moore was commissioned to make a replica of the original base in 1972–73, and it was sold to the art dealer James Mayor, who sold it on to the art collector Robert Adeane (son of Charles Adeane) for $100,000 later in 1973. It was sold to the Tate Gallery in 1976, with funding from the National Art Collections Fund of £5,000 towards the price of £54,000.

== See also ==
- List of sculptures by Henry Moore
