= Troubled Families =

United Kingdom Government scheme

The Troubled Families programme is a UK Government scheme under the Department for Communities and Local Government with the stated aim of helping troubled families turn their lives around.

== Introduction ==
The Troubled Families programme was launched by the former Prime Minister David Cameron in 2011. Louise Casey became Director General, Troubled Families on 1 November 2011. The programme initially intends to change the repeating generational patterns of poor parenting, abuse, violence, drug use, anti-social behaviour and crime in the most troubled families in the UK, with the government investing some £4,000 per family over 3 years, and each family having an assigned family worker. Troubled families are defined as those that have problems and cause problems to the community around them, putting high costs on the public sector. The aim is to get 120,000 troubled families in England to turn their lives around by 2015 and in particular to:

- get children back into school
- reduce youth crime and anti-social behaviour
- put adults on a path back to work
- reduce the high costs these families place on the public sector each year

Mental health problems are often found in such families. David Cameron summarised the nature of the families in his Oldbury speech (New Statesman, 15.12.11) saying

'...these families are the source of a large proportion of the problems in society. Drug addiction. Alcohol abuse. Crime. A culture of disruption and irresponsibility that cascades down the generations... a small number of these families cost an extraordinary amount of money. Last year £9 billion was spent on 120,000 families'.

Although the TFP was supposedly aimed at intensive support the political rhetoric was often pejorative. Louise Casey, the 'Troubled Families Tsar' told the Daily Telegraph (20.07.12)

'We are not running some cuddly social workers programme...we should be talking about things like shame and guilt...we have lost the ability to be judgmental because we worry about being seen as nasty to poor people'.

However most of the people targeted were not involved in crime or anti-social behaviour; most were not alcohol or drug dependent. Most were poor, unemployed and with very high levels of mental / physical illnesses and disabilities in adults and children which resulted in high state support costs (see characteristics section). It is unclear how assertive, non-negotiable intervention and benefit sanctions can eliminate these costs. The evidence for long term success in 'turning around the families' is absent and on 12.06.14 Casey told a meeting at Reform

'As hard as it is to accept, the truth is despite our best efforts over many years - and I include myself in that - we just haven't got it right. We haven't succeeded in getting these families to change or in stopping the transmission of problems from generation to generation - we just haven't.

Many areas of England and Wales have renamed their local Troubled Families programmes, including Families First in Gloucestershire and Wales, Building Resilient Families and Communities (BRFC) in Staffordshire, and Think Family in Birmingham

=== Criticism ===
The family-intervention approach used by the programme has been criticised by Stephen Crossley and Michael Lambert, who say that the evidence suggests that the approach does not work well.

== Characteristics ==
Troubled families, according to anecdotal evidence collected by Casey from family interviews, are characterized by inter-generational transmission, large numbers of children, shifting family make-up, dysfunctional relationships and unhelpful family and friends, abuse, institutional care, teenage mothers, early signs of poor behaviour, troubles at school, anti-social behaviour, mental illness (particularly depression, impeding ability to function in life), and drugs & alcohol use.

The definitive report, 'National Evaluation of the Troubled Families Programme' found that 49% of those in the program were lone parent families. Underage pregnancy was statistically insignificant, with the under-18 conception rate at 2%. 90% of adults had not been convicted of a criminal offence and 93% of adults had no record of anti-social behaviour. Among children, 88% of children had no record of anti-social behaviour. 3% of adults were recorded as treated for alcohol dependency and a further 3% of adults for drug dependency. The families were reported to suffer from high levels of health problems and disabilities. 46% had an adult or adults suffering a mental health problem; 33% of children had mental health problems. 32% of adults and 20% of children had a long-standing physical illness or disability; 39% had a child or children with SEN statements; 46% had a child with school problems; 15% had a child with a temporary exclusion. The families were also poor and in social housing: 74% of households were workless; 83% received out of work benefits; 27% were in rent arrears; 21% were at risk of eviction. The statistical characteristics shared by most families were poverty, unemployment, illness and disability and a high welfare cost to the state.

== Progress ==
=== November 2013 ===
By November 2013 some 22,000 families had been 'turned round', based on metrics such as child school attendance and crimes committed, although at least some of these families continue to commit some crimes.

Casey does not believe people undertake behaviours to gain benefits, and that compulsory contraception, whilst reducing the number of children being born into such families, would lead to high-risk teens finding "something else to get into trouble with. Because they've got trouble in their souls, trouble in their heart, troubles in their head. So even if you brought in some draconian thing like that, they'd find something else to do that would actually be an expression of not having enough love or of having too much pain." But consider also Casey's and Pickles' comments in the introduction.

=== March 2015 ===
By March 2015 the Dept. for Communities and Local Government was claiming that 105,671 families of 117,910 processed had been 'turned around', some 89.6%. 8.9% of families had a member who had found a job. It could not be proved that the projects had achieved this. 80.7% had met the 'crime/ASB/education' target. However, only 7% of adults and 12% of children at project entry had an anti-social behaviour intervention. Only 10% of adults at entry had a proved offence (National Evaluation of the TFP, 2014). It must be concluded that most of the 80.7% families 'turned around' involved reduced truancy, not crime or ASB. According to the Dept. for Communities claims, each family cost the state £26,000 per annum at entry to the programme. The estimated average cost saving at exit was claimed to be £11,200 per family. This implies that although 89.6% of families had been 'turned around', 56.9% of the original family costs were still there (Troubled Families, Green Man Books, 2015, ISBN 978-1514170588).

The 120,000 troubled families allegedly cost the state £9 billion per annum according to Cameron, Pickles and Casey at programme start up. However, Pickles told the House of Commons on 15.03.15 that £1.2 billion per annum would be saved. This was a hypothetical number based on assumptions that alleged improvements in behaviour would be sustained and depended on removing the high costs associated with disabled children and chronically sick, unemployed adults (Troubled Families, Green Man Books, 2015, ISBN 978-1514170588). Pickles was challenged about the numbers in the House by Hilary Benn MP. Pickles responded

'The Rt. Hon. gentleman made a number of points on how we can demonstrate success and square the £1.2 billion with the £9 billion...this is notoriously difficult because governments of all types are absolutely terrible at measuring outcomes'

=== May 2015 ===
DCLG published that 99% of the troubled families had been turned around by May 2015, with 132 of the 152 local authorities having turned around 100% of local troubled families and only two having a success rate under 90%. However, Louise Casey had stated to the Public Accounts Committee that the programme had worked with more than the stated total number of troubled families in England, which would increase the denominator for the 99% figure.

In June 2015, Jonathan Portes said of the figure, "I doubt that the North Korean statistical office would have the cheek." The figure was later criticised as misleading by a Public Accounts Committee.

== Cost savings ==
DCLG has published documents to say that the programme saves money for the public sector by preventive action with families who rely heavily on public-sector services. A report in March 2015 claimed that the first programme had saved £1.2 billion, which was quoted in a speech by David Cameron. This figure was criticised as "unadultered fiction" by Jonathan Portes as it was based on data from only seven local authorities and were based on gross (rather than net) savings. Similar criticisms were made by Full Fact and the Daily Mirror.

A later costs report, based on data from 67 local authorities, was published in October 2016 to accompany the evaluation. This found a gross saving of £7,050 per family per year for these councils, and did not make any claims on savings for the programme as a whole.

== Expansion ==
In June 2013, the UK government announced its intention to extend this intensive help to 400,000 more families, committing £200 million in funding in 2015 to 2016. It expects, for every £4,000 spent on a family, an annual saving of £15,000 in the costs of the police, health and social services in dealing with the family.

== Evaluation leak ==
An evaluation of the initial programme led by Ecorys was leaked to the BBC in August 2016. The evaluation stated that the programme had made "no discernable impact" on unemployment, truancy or criminality in the treatment families. The BBC said that the report was leaked by a senior civil servant who felt that government officials had suppressed the report because of its negative evaluation. The Department for Communities and Local Government denied this, however. The Guardian also noted the scheme had been set up in the wake of the 2011 England riots and was due to cost 1.3 billion pounds by the end of the expanded programme. The Early Intervention Family called for DCLG to publish the report in full, but the Department replied that the evaluation work was not yet finished.

Writing in the Guardian, Anna Bawden blamed the problems on the use of a payment by results system during a period when local government budgets were being cut and said, "The programme was bound to maximise waste."

Following the leak, the House of Commons's Public Accounts Committee began an investigation and the National Audit Office was asked to provide an update on how money had been spent on the programme.

== Evaluation publication and Dispatches programme ==
The Evaluation by the National Institute for Economic and Social Research was published on 17 October 2016. The report found that there had been "no significant impact" of the scheme. A press release from NIESR stated, "we were unable to find consistent evidence that the programme had any significant or systematic impact". The Times reported the following day, "the report was published quietly last night after complaints from Whitehall insiders that it was being suppressed".

On the same day, the Channel 4 series Dispatches broadcast an investigation of the programme that was highly critical of the programme. Interviews with critics of the programme such as Stephen Crossley, Jonathan Portes and Gen Maintland Hudson suggested that the 99% success rate was achieved by councils' classifying minor complaints such as noise as evidence of being a troubled family so that they were more likely to turn the families around and by data matching of families previously worked with before the programme. Dispatches suggested that many of the problems targeted by the programme persisted in areas that claimed to have achieved 100% success.

The Evaluation was published two days before a hearing before the Public Accounts Committee on 19 October. The Public Accounts Committee had expressed concerns to Sajid Javid, the Secretary of State for DCLG, on 5 October that the evaluation documents were not provided to the Committee in advance as were requested. On the date of publication, the Committee tweeted followers to help it review the 765 pages of the Evaluation published late that day before the hearing on 19 October.

In response to the finding of "no significant impact" of the scheme, Dame Casey stated: "They (NIESR) had not, frankly, put any of the caveats in the public domain" and that "they have misrepresented their own research". NIESR responded that the caveats had been detailed in their press statement and that DCLG had approved of the press statement before its release.

The PAC published its report on 19 December 2016. They concluded that the delay in publication had been unacceptable, that DCLG had failed to demonstrate that the programme had any significant impact and that the terminology of saying that the families had been "turned around" was misleading given that many of the families had continuing problems after a result had been claimed. The PAC chairwoman, Meg Hillier, commented that the report was "far more serious" than "a slap on the wrist" for ministers.

== See also ==
- Improving Access to Psychological Therapies
