= Reclining Figure: Festival =

Sculpture series by Henry Moore

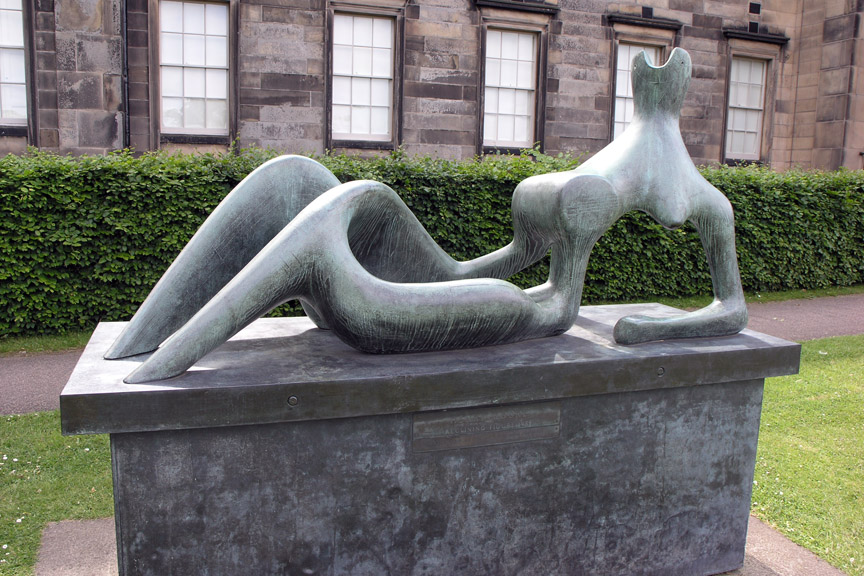
- Sculpture in the grounds of the Scottish National Gallery of Modern Art
- Artist: Henry Moore
- Year: 1951
- Catalogue: LH 293
- Type: Bronze
- Dimensions: 228 cm (90 in)
- Location: Scottish National Gallery of Modern Art

Reclining Figure: Festival (LH 293) is a bronze sculpture by English artist Henry Moore, commissioned by the Arts Council in 1949 for the Festival of Britain in 1951. The sculpture can be viewed as an abstraction of a reclining female human figure, resting on two arms, with a small head.

== Background ==
By 1949, Moore was already recognised as Britain's greatest living sculptor, having won the prize for sculpture at the Venice Biennale in 1948. The Arts Council suggested that a family group would be appropriate for its commission, based on the festival theme of "discovery", but Moore decided to create a reclining female form instead. The Tate Gallery organised a retrospective of Moore's works in 1951, to run alongside the festival on the South Bank. John Read produced a television documentary for the BBC about Moore which included the making of the sculpture, from the initial sketches to the casting of the full-size bronze.

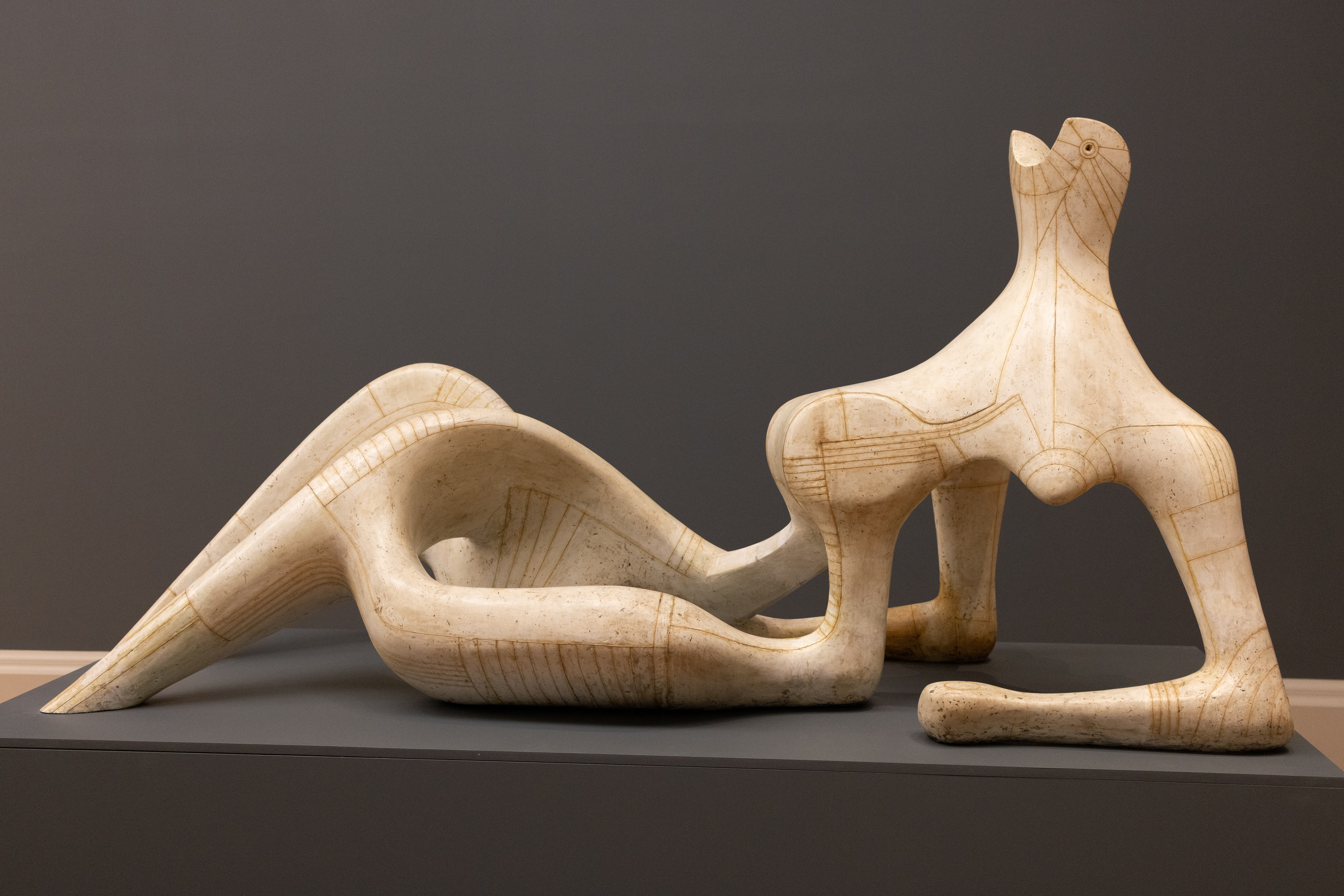
Plaster and string model at Tate Britain

For this sculpture, Moore used a new working method that he would continue to use for his later works, starting with initial sketches before making plaster maquettes, then creating a small bronze working model which would be enlarged to create the full-size final cast. Moore made his sketches and maquettes in 1950 (LH 292a, b and LH 292). A key plaster model measuring 105.5 × 227 × 89 centimetres (41.5 × 89.4 × 35.0 in) was donated to the Tate Gallery in 1978. Strings stuck to the surface create lines that draw the viewer's eye over the sculpture.

A working model was cast in bronze in 1950, in an edition of seven (plus one artist's model). One example sold at Christie's in 2008 for £553,250.

== Full-size casts ==
Finally, Moore made an edition of five full-size bronzes, plus an artist's copy, measuring 228.5 centimetres (90.0 in) in length.

Moore said in 1968, "The Festival Reclining Figure is perhaps my first sculpture where the space and the form are completely dependent on and inseparable from each other. I had reached the stage where I wanted my sculpture to be truly three-dimensional. In my earliest use of holes in sculpture, the holes were features in themselves. Now the space and form are so naturally fused that they are one." (quoted at the Tate)

In 1968, he included the work as one of his four most important works, alongside his Recumbent Figure 1938 in green Hornton Stone, the elmwood Reclining Figure 1939 now in the Detroit Institute of Arts, and first large bronze two-piece sculpture Reclining Figure 1959.

At the Festival of Britain, the first full-size bronze cast was sited in front of Brian O'Rorke's Country Pavilion. Moore knew the sculpture would be relocated after the festival so made a work that did not relate specifically to the original site but which could be viewed in the round. After the end of the Festival, this cast went on loan to Leeds City Art Gallery, and it was exhibited in the grounds of Temple Newsam House. It was vandalised with blue paint in November 1953, and removed from display in 1956. It was lent to the Scottish National Gallery of Modern Art in 1961, which acquired ownership in 1969, and there it remains.

A bronze cast, held by Musée National d'Art Moderne, is displayed in the Jardin des Tuileries near the Musée de l'Orangerie, in Paris.

A third cast was sold for £19,081,250 at Christie's in February 2012, setting a record for a British sculpture and exceeding the £10.3 million paid for Damien Hirst's The Golden Calf in 2008. A further record was set when a fourth cast was sold for £24,722,500 at Christie's in June 2016.

== See also ==
- List of sculptures by Henry Moore
- List of most expensive sculptures
