= Piché =

Piché or Piche may refer to:

== People ==
- Piche (drag queen), French drag performer

=== Surname ===
- Alphonse Piché (1917–1998), Canadian poet
- Camille Piché (1865–1909), Canadian lawyer and politician
- Doris Piché (born 1965), Canadian badminton player
- Eugène-Urgel Piché (1824–1894), Canadian lawyer and politician
- Jean Piché (born 1951), Canadian composer and video artist
- Josée Piché (born 1974), Canadian former ice dancer
- Lee A. Piché (born 1958), American Roman Catholic prelates
- Lillian Piché, or Lillian Shirt (1940–2017), Cree women's rights activist from Alberta, Canada
- Nathan Piché, Canadian musician in the band Article One
- Paul Piché (born 1953), Canadian singer-songwriter and activist
- Paul Piché, Canadian bishop of the Diocese of Mackenzie–Fort Smith in Northwest Territories
- René Piché (1931–2011), Canadian politician
- Robert Piché (born 1952), Canadian airline pilot, captain of the 2001 emergency landing of Air Transat Flight 236
- Roland Piché (born 1938), British artist
- Ron Piché (1935–2011), Canadian Major League Baseball player
- Sébastien Piché (born 1988), Canadian ice hockey player
- Sebastien Piché, Canadian musician in the band Despised Icon

== Other uses ==
- Piche, Guinea-Bissau
- Piché: The Landing of a Man (French: Piché — entre ciel et terre), a 2010 Canadian film about the 2001 Air Transat Flight 236 incident
- Marcel-Piché Prize, awarded to researchers at the Institut de recherches cliniques de Montréal

== See also ==
- Val-d'Or/Rivière Piché Water Aerodrome, Quebec, Canada
