= Henry Moore =

English sculptor (1898–1986)

Henry Moore OM CH FBA
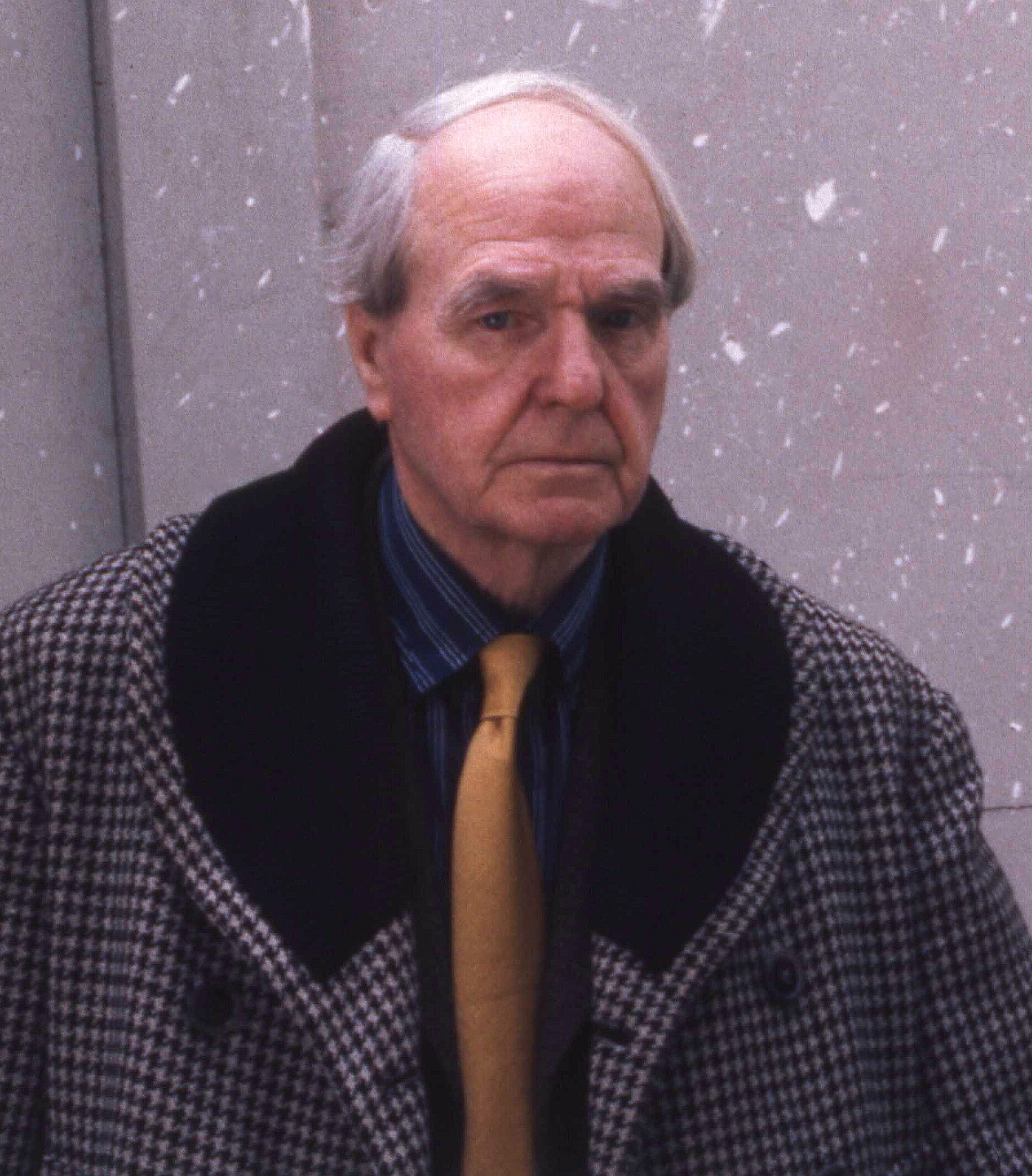
- Moore in 1975
- Born: Henry Spencer Moore; 30 July 1898; Castleford, West Riding of Yorkshire, England
- Died: 31 August 1986 (aged 88); Much Hadham, Hertfordshire, England
- Education: Leeds School of Art; Royal College of Art
- Known for: Sculpture, drawing, graphics, textiles
- Notable work: Family Group
- Movement: Bronze Sculpture, Modernism
- Spouse: Irina Radetsky (m. 1929)
- Children: 1

Henry Spencer Moore OM CH FBA (30 July 1898 – 31 August 1986) was an English visual artist. He is best known for his semi-abstract monumental bronze sculptures which are located around the world as public works of art. Moore also produced many drawings, including a series depicting Londoners sheltering from the Blitz during the Second World War, along with other graphic works on paper.

His forms are usually abstractions of the human figure, typically depicting mother-and-child or reclining figures. Moore's works are usually suggestive of the female body, apart from a phase in the 1950s when he sculpted family groups. His forms are generally pierced or contain hollow spaces. Many interpreters liken the undulating form of his reclining figures to the landscape and hills of his Yorkshire birthplace.

Moore became well known through his carved marble and larger-scale abstract cast bronze sculptures, and was instrumental in introducing a particular form of modernism to the United Kingdom. His ability in later life to fulfil large-scale commissions made him exceptionally wealthy. Despite this, he lived frugally; most of the money he earned went towards endowing the Henry Moore Foundation, which continues to support education and promotion of the arts.

== Life ==
=== Early life ===
Moore was born in Castleford, West Riding of Yorkshire, England, to Mary (née Baker) and Raymond Spencer Moore. His father was of Irish descent and became pit deputy (responsible for safety) and then under-manager of the Wheldale colliery in Castleford. He was an autodidact with an interest in music and literature. Determined that his sons would not work in the mines, he saw formal education as the route to their advancement. Henry was the seventh of eight children in a family that often struggled with poverty. He attended infant and junior schools in Castleford, where he began modelling in clay and carving in wood. He professed to have decided to become a sculptor when he was eleven after hearing of Michelangelo's achievements at a Sunday School reading.

On his second attempt he was accepted at Castleford Secondary School, which several of his siblings had attended, where his headmaster soon noticed his talent and interest in medieval sculpture. His art teacher, Alice Gostick, broadened his knowledge of art, and with her encouragement, he determined to make art his career; first by sitting for examinations for a scholarship to the local art college. Moore's earliest recorded carvings – a plaque for the Scott Society at Castleford Secondary School, and a Roll of Honour commemorating the boys who went to fight in the First World War from the school – were executed around this time.

Despite his early promise, Moore's parents had been against him training as a sculptor, a vocation they considered manual labour with few career prospects. After a brief introduction as a student teacher, Moore became a teacher at the school he had attended. Upon turning eighteen, Moore volunteered for army service in the First World War. He was the youngest man in the Prince of Wales' Own Civil Service Rifles regiment and was injured in 1917 in a gas attack, on 30 November at Bourlon Wood, during the Battle of Cambrai. After recovering in hospital, he saw out the remainder of the war as a physical training instructor, only returning to France as the Armistice was signed. He recalled later, "for me the war passed in a romantic haze of trying to be a hero." This attitude changed as he reflected on the destructiveness of war and in 1940 he wrote, in a letter to his friend Arthur Sale, that "a year or two after [the war] the sight of a khaki uniform began to mean everything in life that was wrong and wasteful and anti-life. And I still have that feeling."

=== Beginnings as a sculptor ===
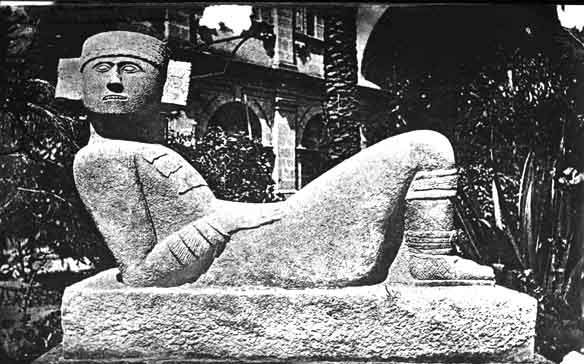
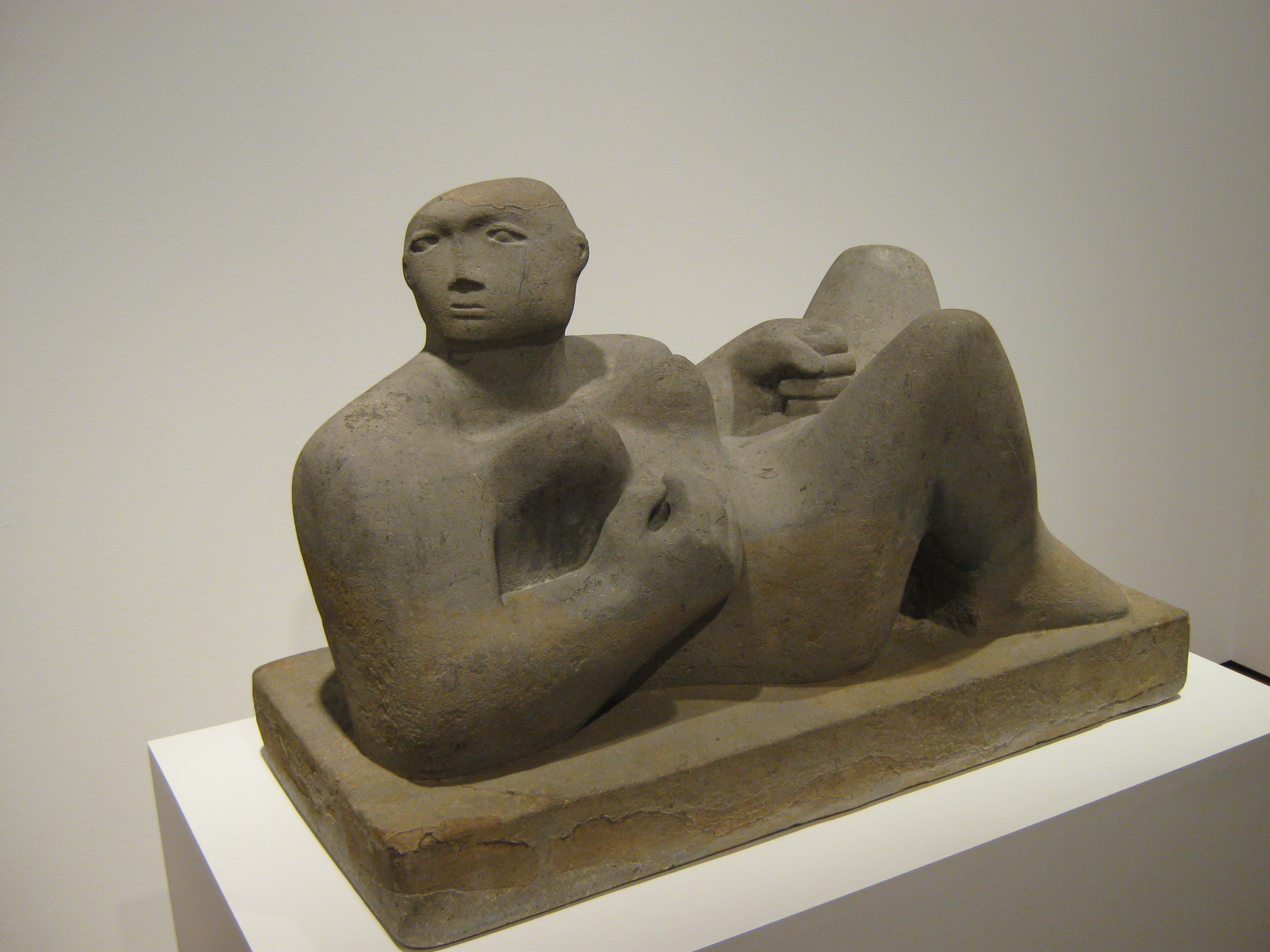
Moore's reclining figures, such as the 1930 Reclining Woman (bottom), were influenced by chacmool figures, such as this one (top) from Chichen Itza.

After the war, Moore received an ex-serviceman's grant to continue his education and in 1919 he became a student at the Leeds School of Art (now Leeds Arts University), which set up a sculpture studio especially for him. At the college, he met Barbara Hepworth, a fellow student who would also become a well-known British sculptor, and began a friendship and gentle professional rivalry that lasted for many years. In Leeds, Moore also had access to the modernist works in the collection of Sir Michael Sadler, the university Vice-Chancellor, which had a pronounced effect on his development. In 1921, Moore won a scholarship to study at the Royal College of Art in London, along with Hepworth and other Yorkshire contemporaries. While in London, Moore extended his knowledge of primitive art and sculpture, studying the ethnographic collections at the British Museum.

The student sculptures of both Moore and Hepworth followed the standard romantic Victorian style, and included natural forms, landscapes and figurative modelling of animals. Moore later became uncomfortable with classically derived ideals; his later familiarity with primitivism and the influence of sculptors such as Constantin Brâncuși, Jacob Epstein, Henri Gaudier-Brzeska and Frank Dobson led him to the method of direct carving, in which imperfections in the material and marks left by tools became part of the finished sculpture. Having adopted this technique, Moore was in conflict with academic tutors who did not appreciate such a modern approach. During one exercise set by Derwent Wood (the professor of sculpture at the Royal College), Moore was asked to reproduce a marble relief of Domenico Rosselli's The Virgin and Child by first modelling the relief in plaster, then reproducing it in marble using the mechanical aid known as a "pointing machine", a technique called "pointing". Instead, he carved the relief directly, even marking the surface to simulate the prick marks that would have been left by the pointing machine.

In 1924, Moore won a six-month travelling scholarship which he spent in Northern Italy studying the great works of Michelangelo, Giotto di Bondone, Giovanni Pisano and several other Old Masters. During this period he also visited Paris, took advantage of the timed-sketching classes at the Académie Colarossi, and viewed, in the Trocadero, a plaster cast of a Toltec-Maya sculptural form, the Chac Mool, which he had previously seen in book illustrations. The reclining figure was to have a profound effect upon Moore's work, becoming the primary motif of his sculpture.

=== Hampstead ===
On returning to London, Moore undertook a seven-year teaching post at the Royal College of Art. He was required to work two days a week, which allowed him time to spend on his own work. His first public commission, West Wind (1928–29), was one of the eight reliefs of the 'four winds' high on the walls of London Underground's headquarters at 55 Broadway. The other 'winds' were carved by contemporary sculptors including Eric Gill with the ground-level pieces provided by Epstein. 1928 saw Moore's first solo exhibition, held at the Warren Gallery in London. On 19 July 1929, Moore married Irina Radetsky, a painting student at the Royal College. Irina was born in Kiev in 1907. Her father was killed in the Russian Revolution and her mother was evacuated to Paris where she married a British army officer. Irina was smuggled to Paris a year later and went to school there until she was 16, after which she was sent to live with her stepfather's relatives in Buckinghamshire.

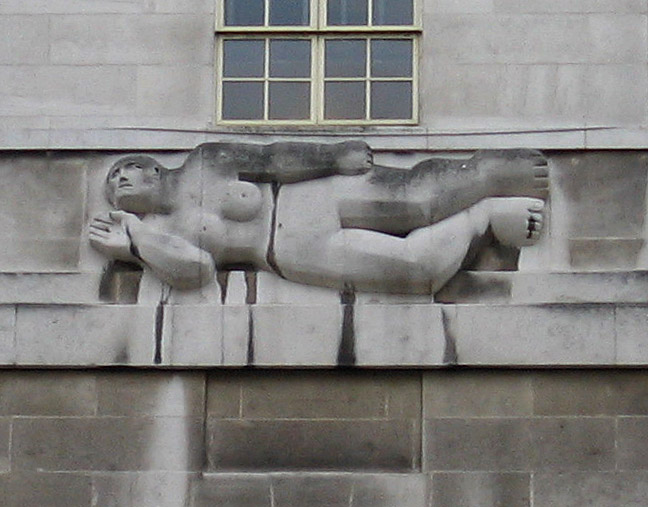
West Wind, 1928–29; Moore's first public commission was carved from Portland stone and shows the influence of Michelangelo's figures for the Medici Chapel and the Chac Mool figure.

Irina found security in her marriage to Moore and was soon posing for him. Shortly after they married, the couple moved to a studio in Hampstead at 11a Parkhill Road NW3, joining a small colony of avant-garde artists who were taking root there. Shortly afterward, Hepworth and her second husband Ben Nicholson moved into a studio around the corner from Moore, while Naum Gabo, Roland Penrose, Cecil Stephenson and the art critic Herbert Read also lived in the area (Read referred to the area as "a nest of gentle artists"). The area was also a stopping-off point for many refugee artists, architects and designers from continental Europe en route to America.

In 1932, after six years teaching at the Royal College, Moore took up a post as the Head of the Department of Sculpture at the Chelsea School of Art. Artistically, Moore, Hepworth and other members of The Seven and Five Society would develop steadily more abstract work, partly influenced by their frequent trips to Paris and their contact with leading progressive artists, notably Pablo Picasso, Georges Braque, Jean Arp and Alberto Giacometti. Moore flirted with Surrealism, joining Paul Nash's modern art movement "Unit One", in 1933. In 1934, Moore visited Spain; he visited the cave of Altamira (which he described as the "Royal Academy of Cave Painting"), Madrid, Toledo and Pamplona.

In 1936, Moore joined a group of surrealist artists founded by Roland Penrose, and the same year was honorary treasurer to the organising committee of the London International Surrealist Exhibition. In 1937, Roland Penrose purchased an abstract 'Mother and Child' in stone from Moore that he displayed in the front garden of his house in Hampstead. The work proved controversial with other residents and the local press ran a campaign against the piece over the next two years. At this time Moore gradually transitioned from direct carving to casting in bronze, modelling preliminary maquettes in clay or plaster rather than making preparatory drawings.

In 1938, Moore met Kenneth Clark for the first time. From this time, Clark became an unlikely but influential champion of Moore's work, and through his position as member of the Arts Council of Great Britain he secured exhibitions and commissions for the artist.

=== Second World War ===
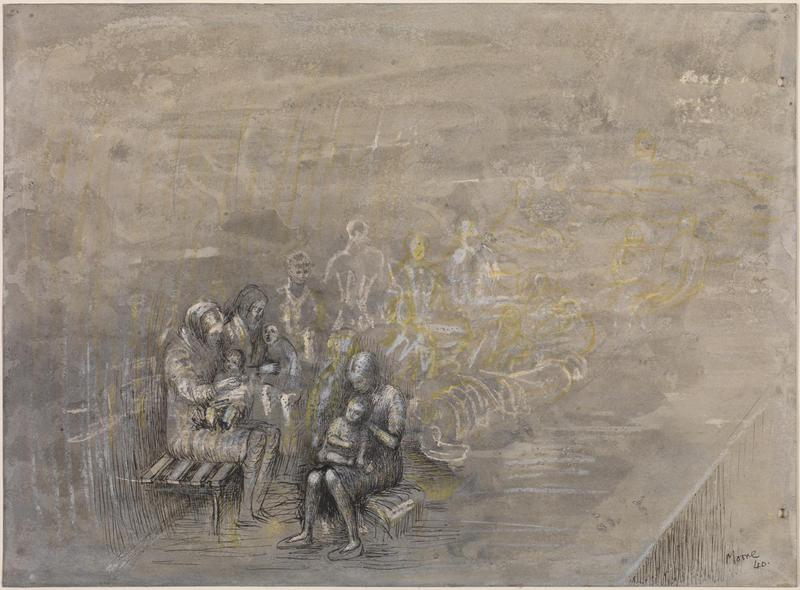
Women and Children in the Tube (1940) (Art.IWM ART LD 759)

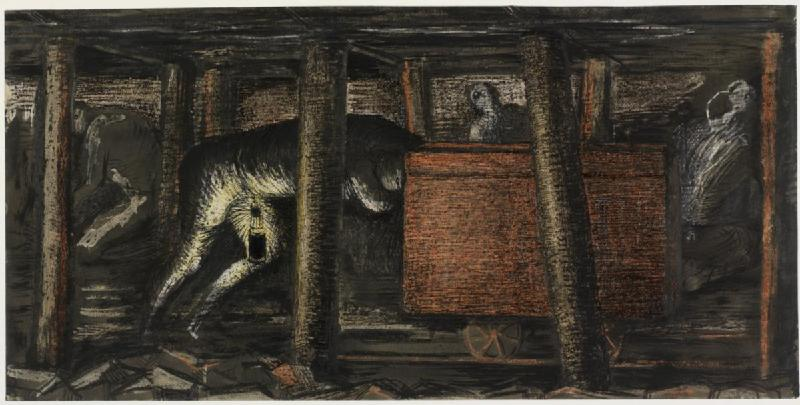
At the Coal Face. A Miner Pushing a Tub (1942) (Art.IWM ART LD 2240)

At the outbreak of the Second World War the Chelsea School of Art was evacuated to Northampton and Moore resigned his teaching post. During the war, Moore produced powerful drawings of Londoners sleeping in the London Underground while sheltering from the Blitz. Kenneth Clark, the chairman of the War Artists' Advisory Committee (WAAC), had previously tried to recruit Moore as a full-time salaried war artist and now agreed to purchase some of the shelter drawings and issued contracts for further examples. The shelter drawings WAAC acquired were completed between the autumn of 1940 and the spring of 1941 and are regarded as among the finest products of the WAAC scheme. In August 1941, WAAC commissioned Moore to draw miners working underground at the Wheldale Colliery in Yorkshire, where his father had worked at the start of the century. Moore drew the people in the shelters as passively waiting the all-clear while miners aggressively worked the coal-faces. It has been suggested that Moore's wartime drawings of the Underground and coalmines were inspired, in part, by Gustave Doré's illustrations for Dante's 'Divine Comedy'. Moore's drawings helped to boost his international reputation, particularly in America where examples were included in the WAAC Britain at War exhibition which toured North America throughout the war.

After their Hampstead home was hit by bomb shrapnel in September 1940, Moore and Irina moved out of London to live in a farmhouse called Hoglands in the hamlet of Perry Green near Much Hadham, Hertfordshire. This was to become Moore's home and workshop for the rest of his life. Despite acquiring significant wealth later in life, Moore never felt the need to move to larger premises and, apart from the addition of a number of outbuildings and studios, the house changed little over the years. In 1943 he received a commission from St Matthew's Church, Northampton, to carve a Madonna and Child; this sculpture was the first in an important series of family-group sculptures.

=== Later years ===
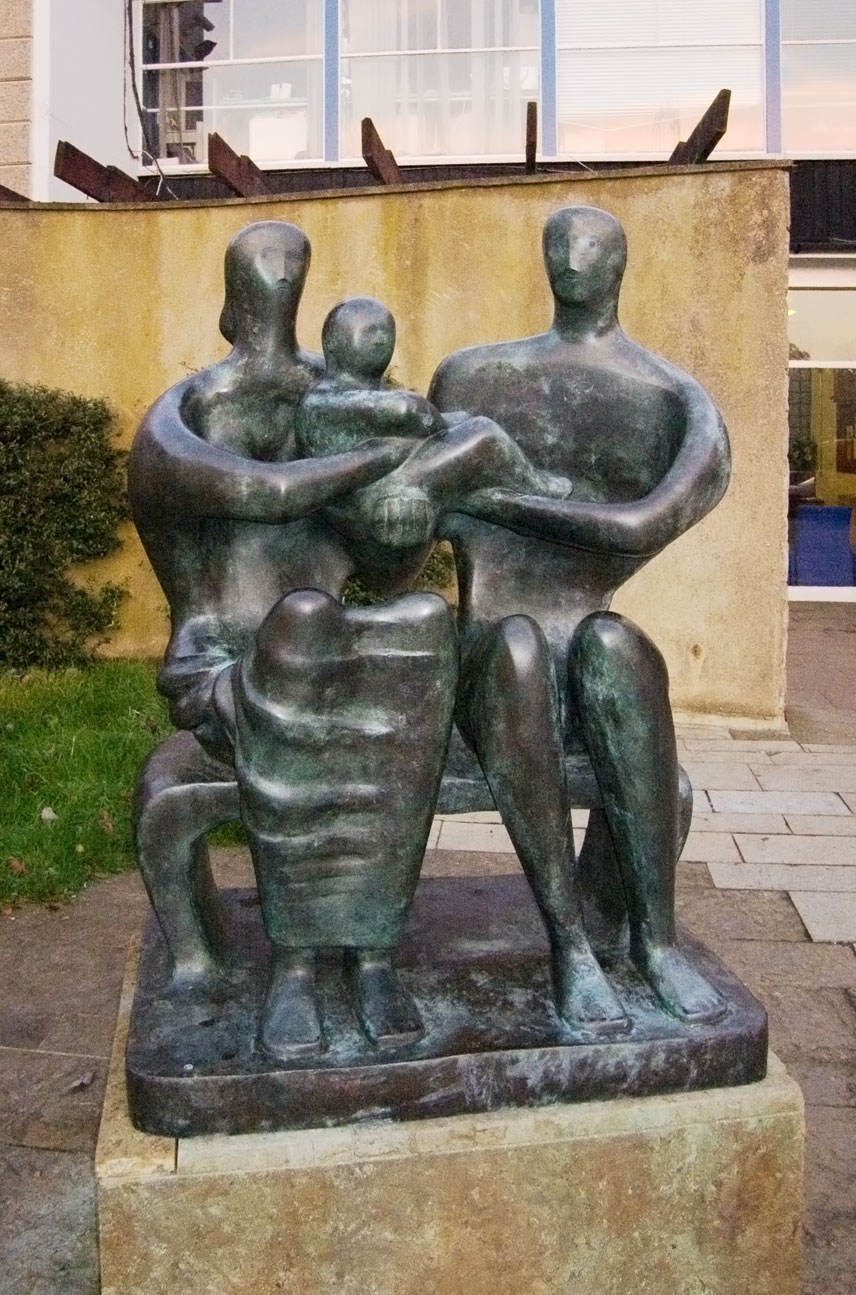
Family Group (1950) bronze, Barclay School, Stevenage, Hertfordshire. Moore's first large-scale commission after the Second World War.

After the war and following several earlier miscarriages, Irina gave birth to their daughter, Mary Moore, in March 1946. The child was named after Moore's mother, who had died two years earlier. Both the loss of his mother and the arrival of a baby focused Moore's mind on the family, which he expressed in his work by producing many "mother-and-child" compositions, although reclining and internal/external figures also remained popular. In the same year, Moore made his first visit to America when a retrospective exhibition of his work opened at the Museum of Modern Art in New York City.

Before the war, Moore had been approached by educator Henry Morris, who was trying to reform education with his concept of the Village College. Morris had engaged Walter Gropius as the architect for his second village college at Impington near Cambridge, and he wanted Moore to design a major public sculpture for the site. The County Council, however, could not afford Gropius's full design, and scaled back the project when Gropius emigrated to America. Lacking funds, Morris had to cancel Moore's sculpture, which had not progressed beyond the maquette stage. Moore was able to reuse the design in 1950 for a similar commission outside a secondary school for the new town of Stevenage. This time, the project was completed and Family Group became Moore's first large-scale public bronze.

The UNESCO piece being moved, in 1963, to allow for building work

In the 1950s, Moore began to receive increasingly significant commissions. He exhibited Reclining Figure: Festival at the Festival of Britain in 1951, and in 1958 produced a large marble reclining figure for the UNESCO building in Paris. With many more public works of art, the scale of Moore's sculptures grew significantly and he started to employ an increasing number of assistants to work with him at Much Hadham, including Anthony Caro Roland Piché Maurice Lowe and Richard Wentworth.

On the campus of the University of Chicago in December 1967, 25 years to the minute after the team of physicists led by Enrico Fermi achieved the first controlled, self-sustaining nuclear chain reaction, Moore's Nuclear Energy was unveiled on the site of what was once the university's football field stands, in the rackets court beneath which the experiments had taken place. This 12-foot-tall piece in the middle of a large, open plaza is often thought to represent a mushroom cloud topped by a massive human skull, but Moore's interpretation was very different. He once told a friend that he hoped viewers would "go around it, looking out through the open spaces, and that they may have a feeling of being in a cathedral." In Chicago, Illinois, Moore also commemorated science with a large bronze sundial, locally named Man Enters the Cosmos (1980), which was commissioned to recognise the space exploration program.

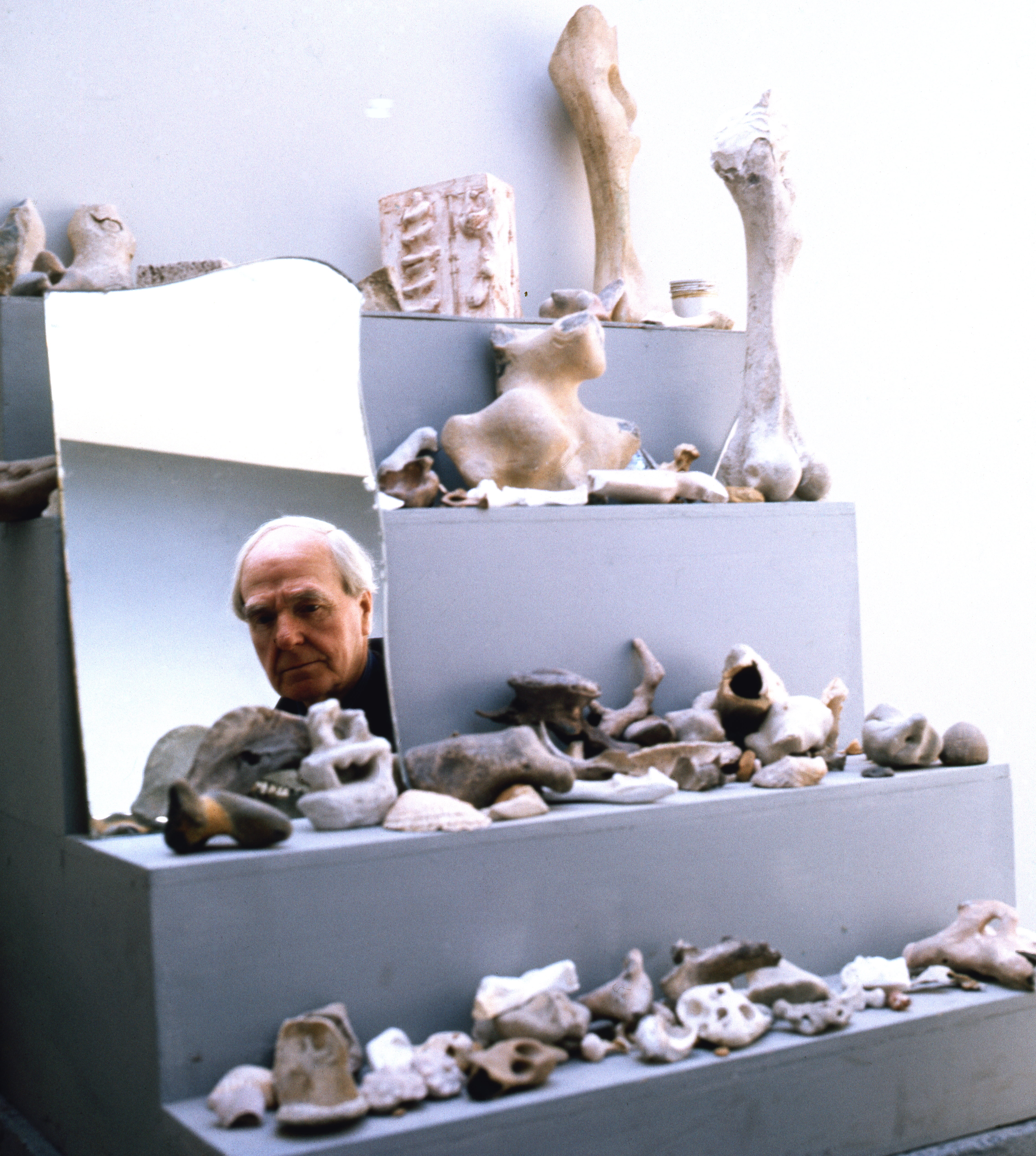
Moore in his studio in England (1975), by Allan Warren

The last three decades of Moore's life continued in a similar vein; several major retrospectives took place around the world, notably a very prominent exhibition in the summer of 1972 in the grounds of the Forte di Belvedere overlooking Florence. Following the pioneering documentary 'Henry Moore', produced by John Read in 1951, he appeared in many films. In 1964, for instance, Moore was featured in the documentary "5 British Sculptors (Work and Talk)" by American filmmaker Warren Forma. By the end of the 1970s, there were some 40 exhibitions a year featuring his work. The number of commissions continued to increase; he completed Knife Edge Two Piece in 1962 for College Green near the Houses of Parliament in London. According to Moore, "When I was offered the site near the House of Lords ... I liked the place so much that I didn't bother to go and see an alternative site in Hyde Park—one lonely sculpture can be lost in a large park. The House of Lords site is quite different. It is next to a path where people walk and it has a few seats where they can sit and contemplate it."

As his wealth grew, Moore began to worry about his legacy. With the help of his daughter Mary, he set up the Henry Moore Trust in 1972, with a view to protecting his estate from death duties. By 1977, he was paying close to a million pounds a year in income tax; to mitigate his tax burden, he established the Henry Moore Foundation as a registered charity with Irina and Mary as trustees. The Foundation was established to encourage the public appreciation of the visual arts and especially the works of Moore. It now runs his house and estate at Perry Green, with a gallery, sculpture park and studios.

In 1979, Henry Moore became unexpectedly known in Germany when his sculpture Large Two Forms was installed in the forecourt of the German Chancellery in Bonn, which was the capital city of West Germany prior to German reunification in October 1990.

Moore died on 31 August 1986 at his home in Perry Green. His body was interred at the churchyard of St Thomas's Church.

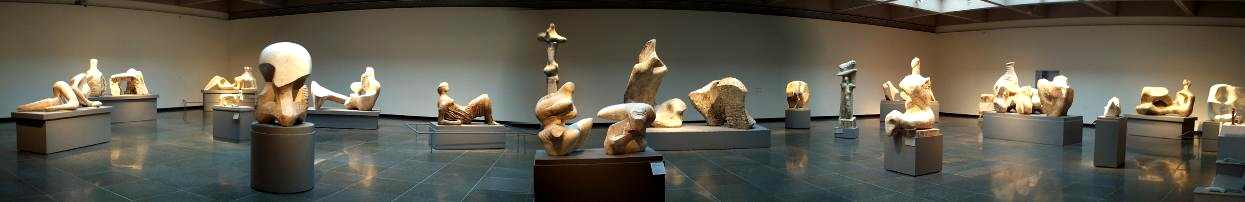
The Art Gallery of Ontario's Henry Moore collection is the largest public collection of his works in the world

== Style ==
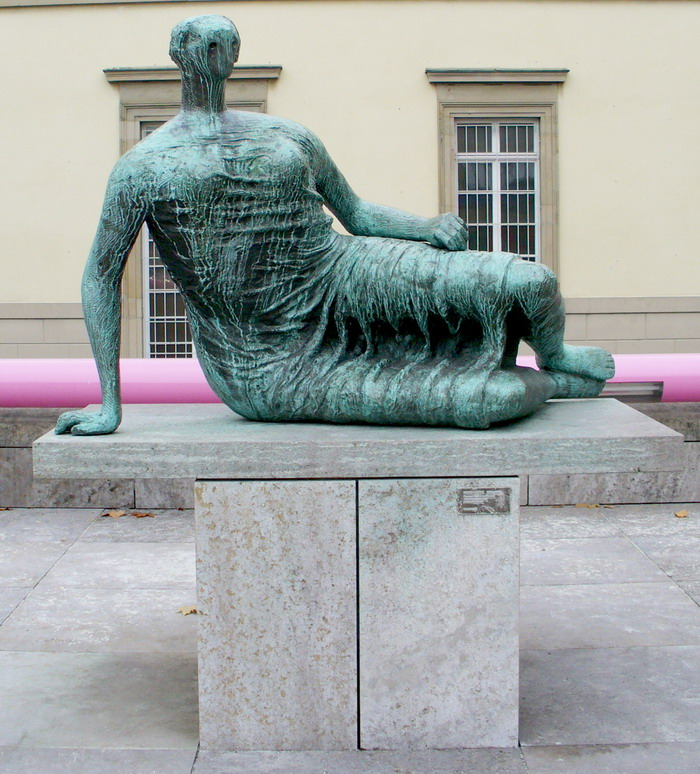
Moore's bronze Draped Reclining Woman 1957–58 ("Die Liegende") in Stuttgart, typical of his early reclining figures

Moore's signature form is a reclining figure. Moore's exploration of this form, under the influence of the Toltec-Mayan figure he had seen at the Louvre, was to lead him to increasing abstraction as he turned his thoughts towards experimentation with the elements of design. Moore's earlier reclining figures deal principally with mass, while his later ones contrast the solid elements of the sculpture with the space, not only round them but generally through them as he pierced the forms with openings.

Earlier figures are pierced in a conventional manner, in which bent limbs separate from and rejoin the body. The later, more abstract figures are often penetrated by spaces directly through the body, by which means Moore explores and alternates concave and convex shapes. These more extreme piercings developed in parallel with Barbara Hepworth's sculptures. Hepworth first pierced a torso after misreading a review of one of Henry Moore's early shows. The plaster Reclining Figure: Festival (1951) in the Tate, is characteristic of Moore's later sculptures: an abstract female figure intercut with voids. As with much of the post-War work, there are several bronze casts of this sculpture. When Moore's niece asked why his sculptures had such simple titles, he replied,

All art should have a certain mystery and should make demands on the spectator. Giving a sculpture or a drawing too explicit a title takes away part of that mystery so that the spectator moves on to the next object, making no effort to ponder the meaning of what he has just seen. Everyone thinks that he or she looks but they don't really, you know.

Moore's early work is focused on direct carving, in which the form of the sculpture evolves as the artist repeatedly whittles away at the block. In the 1930s, Moore's transition into modernism paralleled that of Barbara Hepworth; the two exchanged new ideas with each other and several other artists then living in Hampstead. Moore made many preparatory sketches and drawings for each sculpture. Most of these sketchbooks have survived and provide insight into Moore's development. He placed great importance on drawing; in old age, when he had arthritis, he continued to draw.

After the Second World War, Moore's bronzes took on their larger scale, which was particularly suited for public art commissions. As a matter of practicality, he largely abandoned direct carving, and took on several assistants to help produce the larger forms based on maquettes. By the end of the 1940s, he produced sculptures increasingly by modelling, working out the shape in clay or plaster before casting the final work in bronze using the lost wax technique. These maquettes often began as small forms shaped by Moore's hands—a process that gives his work an organic feeling. They are from the body. At his home in Much Hadham, Moore built up a collection of natural objects; skulls, driftwood, pebbles, rocks and shells, which he would use to provide inspiration for organic forms. For his largest works, he usually produced a half-scale, working model before scaling up for the final moulding and casting at a bronze foundry. Moore often refined the final full plaster shape and added surface marks before casting.

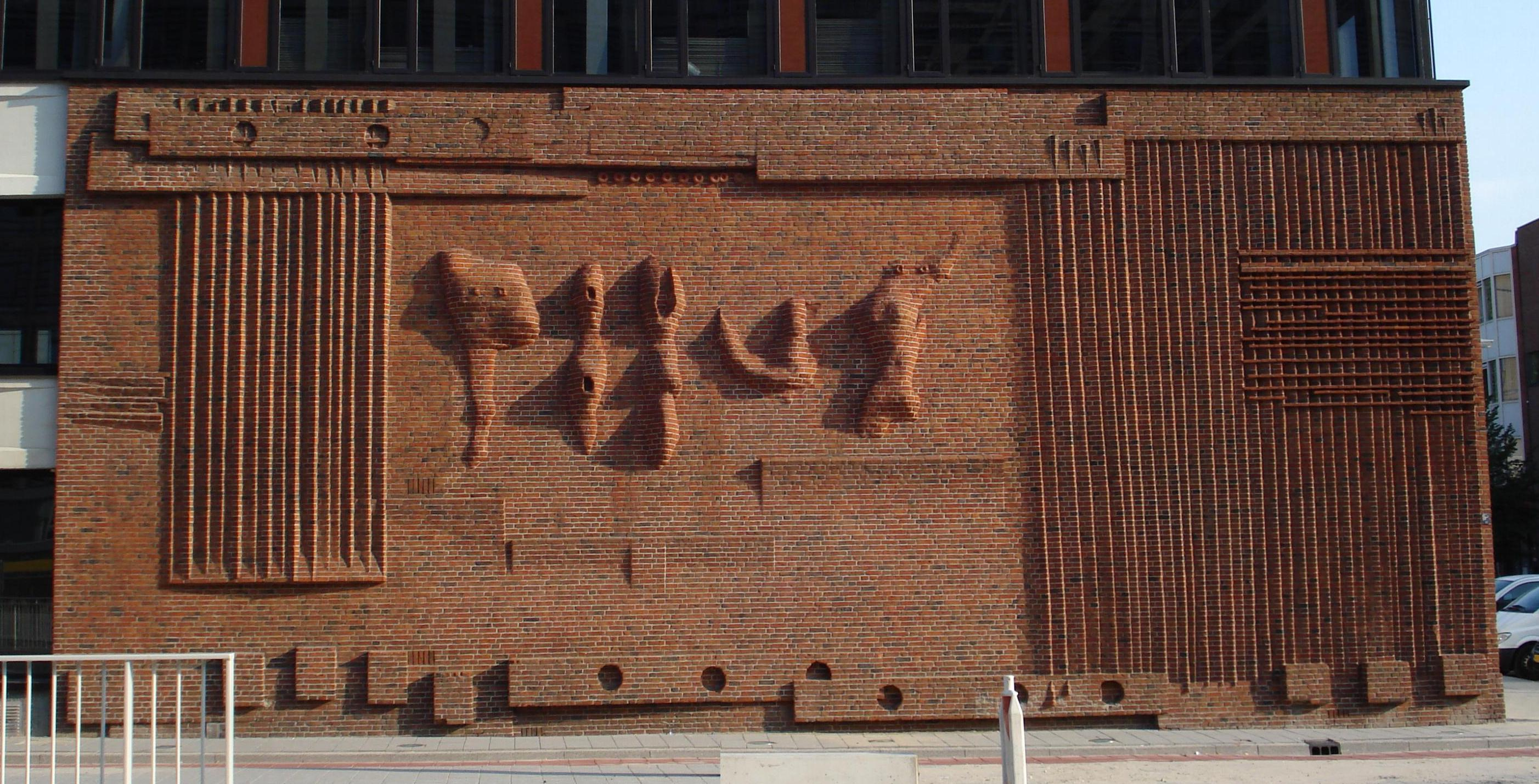
Wall Relief No. 1, (1955), Bouwcentrum, Rotterdam

Moore produced at least three significant examples of architectural sculpture during his career. In 1928, despite his own self-described "extreme reservations", he accepted his first public commission for West Wind for the London Underground Building at 55 Broadway in London, joining the company of Jacob Epstein and Eric Gill. In 1953, he completed a four-part screen carved in Portland stone for the Time-Life Building in New Bond Street, London, and in 1955 Moore turned to his first and only work in carved brick, Wall Relief at the Bouwcentrum in Rotterdam. The brick relief was sculpted with 16,000 bricks by two Dutch bricklayers under Moore's supervision.

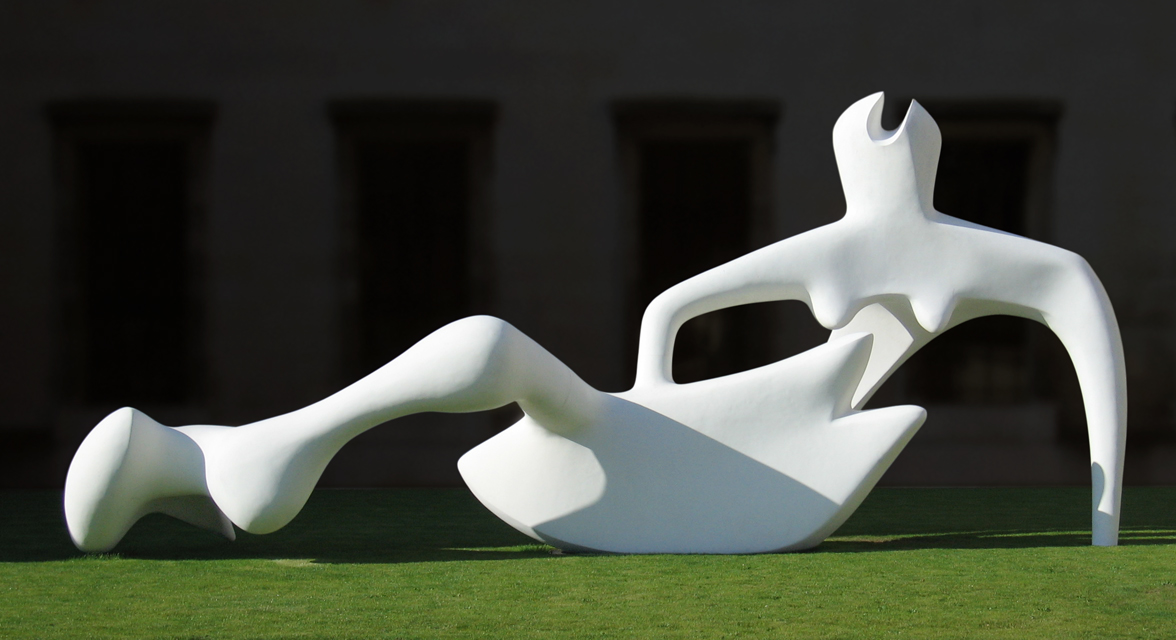
Large Reclining Figure (1984, based on a smaller model of 1938), Fitzwilliam Museum, Cambridge

The aftermath of the Second World War, The Holocaust, and the age of the atomic bomb instilled in the sculpture of the mid-1940s a sense that art should return to its pre-cultural and pre-rational origins. In the literature of the day, writers such as Jean-Paul Sartre advocated a similar reductive philosophy. At an introductory speech in New York City for an exhibition of one of the finest modernist sculptors, Alberto Giacometti, Sartre spoke of "The beginning and the end of history". Moore's sense of England emerging undefeated from siege led to his focus on pieces characterised by endurance and continuity.

== Legacy ==
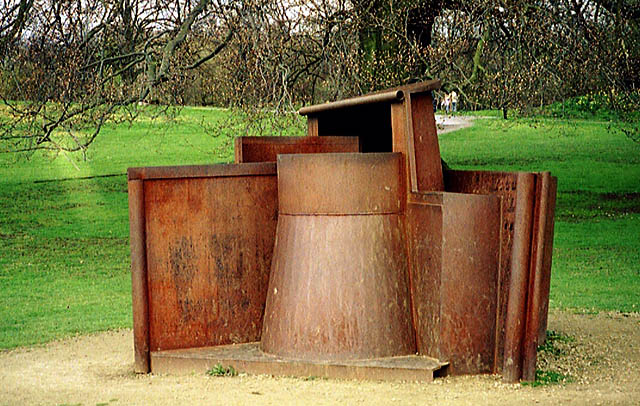
Dream City by Anthony Caro (1996), rusting steel, at the Yorkshire Sculpture Park

Most sculptors who emerged during the height of Moore's fame, and in the aftermath of his death, found themselves in his shadow. By the late 1940s, Moore was a worldwide celebrity; he was the voice of British sculpture, and of British modernism in general. The next generation was constantly compared against him, and reacted by challenging his legacy, his "establishment" credentials and his position. At the 1952 Venice Biennale, eight new British sculptors produced their Geometry of Fear works as a direct contrast to the ideals behind Moore's idea of Endurance, Continuity; his large bronze Double Standing Figure stood outside the British pavilion, and contrasted strongly with the rougher and more angular works inside.

Moore had a direct influence on several generations of both British and international sculptors. Among the artists who have acknowledged Moore's importance to their work are Sir Anthony Caro, Phillip King and Isaac Witkin, all three having been assistants to Moore. Other artists whose work was influenced by him include Helaine Blumenfeld, Drago Marin Cherina, Lynn Chadwick, Eduardo Paolozzi, Bernard Meadows, Reg Butler, William Turnbull, Robert Adams, Kenneth Armitage, and Geoffrey Clarke.

The Henry Moore Foundation helps to preserve his legacy by supporting sculptors and creating exhibitions with a goal of developing appreciation for visual arts. The Foundation was established by Moore and his family in 1977 in England, and is still active.

Today, the Henry Moore Foundation manages the artist's former home at Perry Green in Hertfordshire as a visitor destination, with 70 acres (28 ha) of sculpture grounds as well as his restored house and studios. It also runs the Henry Moore Institute in Leeds which organizes exhibitions and research activities in international sculpture. The foundation continues to promote contemporary art in the United Kingdom and abroad through its grants and exhibitions program.

=== Controversy ===
In December 2005, the two ton Reclining Figure (1969–70) – insured for £3 million – was lifted by crane from the grounds of the Henry Moore Foundation onto a lorry and has not been recovered. Two men were jailed for a year in 2012 for stealing a sculpture called Sundial (1965) and the bronze plinth of another work, also from the foundation's estate. In October 2013 Standing Figure (1950), one of four Moore pieces in Glenkiln Sculpture Park, estimated to be worth £3 million, was stolen.

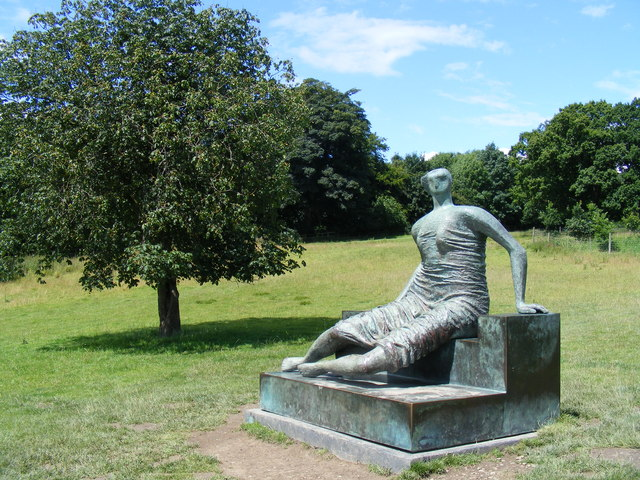
Draped Seated Woman 1957–58, Yorkshire Sculpture Park

In 2012, the council of the London Borough of Tower Hamlets announced its plans to sell another version of Draped Seated Woman 1957–58, a 1.6-tonne bronze sculpture. Moore, a well-known socialist, had sold the sculpture at a fraction of its market value to the former London County Council on the understanding that it would be displayed in a public space and might enrich the lives of those living in a socially deprived area. Nicknamed Old Flo, it was installed on the Stifford council estate in 1962 but was vandalised and moved to the Yorkshire Sculpture Park in 1997. Tower Hamlets Council later had considered moving Draped Seated Woman to private land in Canary Wharf but instead chose to "explore options" for a sale. In response to the announcement an open letter was published in The Guardian, signed by Mary Moore, the artist's daughter; Sir Nicholas Serota, Director of the Tate Gallery; filmmaker Danny Boyle; and artists including Jeremy Deller. The letter said that the sale "goes against the spirit of Henry Moore's original sale" of the work. The sale was delayed by a legal case, and a change in mayor resulted in it being retained, it is, as of 2024, on display in Cabot Square in London Docklands.

=== Popular interest ===
Popular interest in Moore's work was perceived by some to have declined for a while in the UK but has been revived in recent times by exhibitions including at Kew Gardens in 2007, Tate Britain in 2010, Hatfield House in 2011, and the Wallace Collection in 2019.

== Collections ==
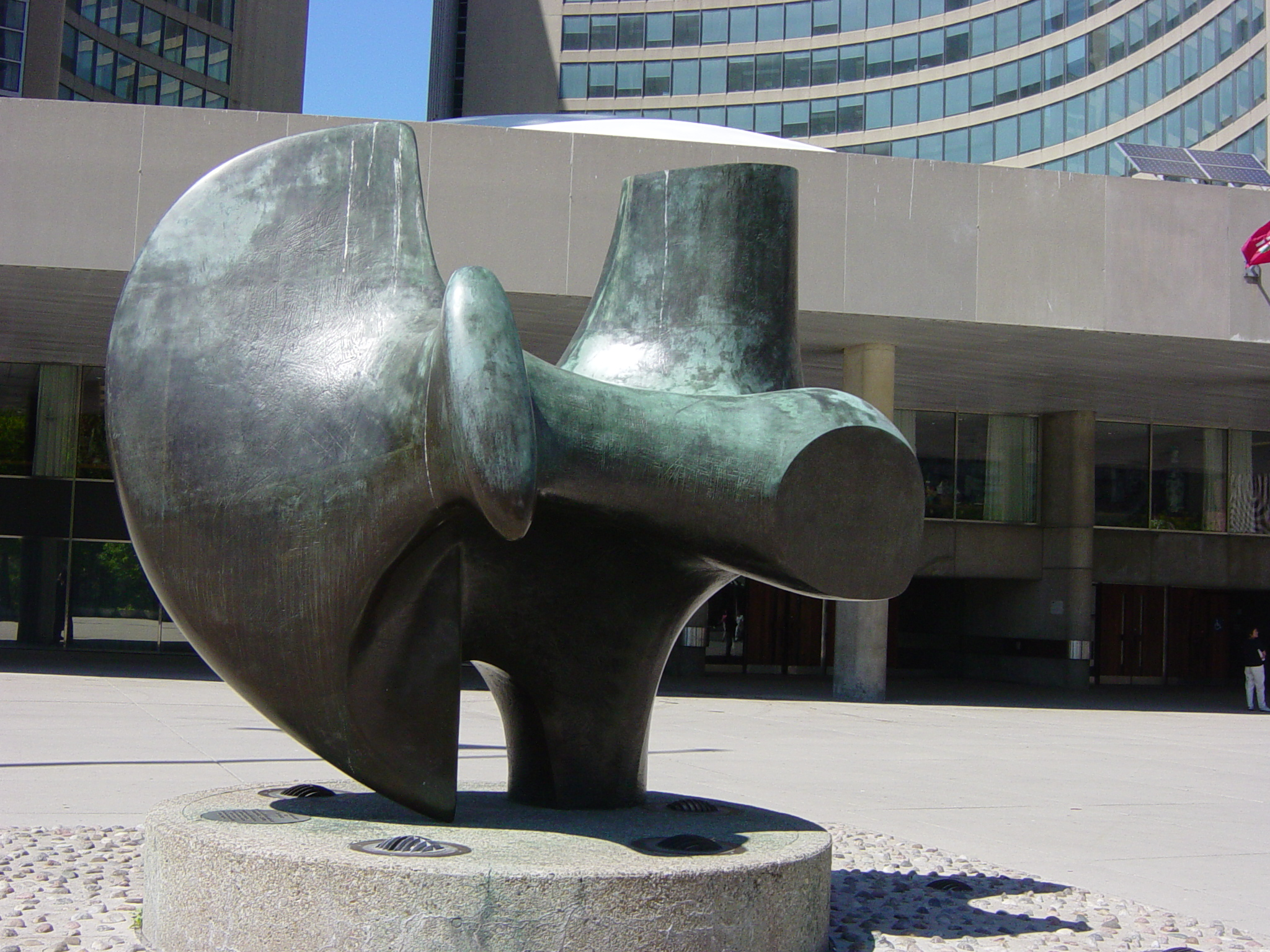
Three Way Piece No. 2 (The Archer), (1964–65) has been on display in front of Toronto City Hall in Nathan Phillips Square since 1966.

=== United Kingdom ===
The world's largest collection of Moore's work is open to the public and is housed in the house and grounds of the 70-acre estate that was Moore's home for 40 years in Perry Green in Hertfordshire. The site and the collection are now owned by the Henry Moore Foundation.

In December 2005, thieves entered a courtyard at the Henry Moore Foundation and stole a cast of Moore's Reclining Figure 1969–70 (LH 608) – a 3.6 m (12 ft) long, 2.1-tonne bronze sculpture. Closed-circuit-television footage showed that they used a crane to lower the piece onto a stolen flatbed truck. A substantial reward was offered by the foundation for information leading to its recovery. By May 2009, after a thorough investigation, British officials said they believe the work, once valued at £3 million was probably sold for scrap metal, fetching about £5,000. In July 2012 the 22 inches (56 cm) bronze Sundial 1965, valued at £500,000, was stolen from the Moore Foundation. Later that year, following the details of the theft being publicised on the BBC Crimewatch television programme, the work was recovered, and the thieves were sentenced to twelve months' custody.

Moore presented 36 sculptures, as well as drawings, maquettes and other works to the Tate Gallery in 1978.

=== Canada ===
The Henry Moore Sculpture Centre in the Art Gallery of Ontario, Toronto, opened in 1974. It comprises the world's largest public collection of Moore's work, most of it donated by him between 1971 and 1974. Moore's Three Way Piece No. 2 (The Archer) has also been on display in Nathan Phillips Square at Toronto City Hall since 1966.

=== United States ===
Works by Moore are in the collections of institutions in 25 states and the District of Columbia including the Metropolitan Museum of Art, the Museum of Modern Art, both in New York City, and the National Gallery of Art, Washington, D.C.

There are eleven large sculptural bronze works by Moore in the grounds of the Nelson-Atkins Museum of Art in Kansas City, Missouri. There is also a large bronze, the "Seated Woman" of 1957, inside the museum. This is the largest collection of Moore's monumental bronzes in the United States. The museum also contains about 43 smaller sculptures by Moore which are usually not on display. The museum's holdings also include a few works on paper and four large woven pieces, titled "Seated Figures: Ideas for Terracotta" (1981–1982), which are 7–8 foot long tapestries by British weavers based on drawings by Moore. Twenty-eight more tapestries were produced during Moore's lifetime.

== Recognition ==
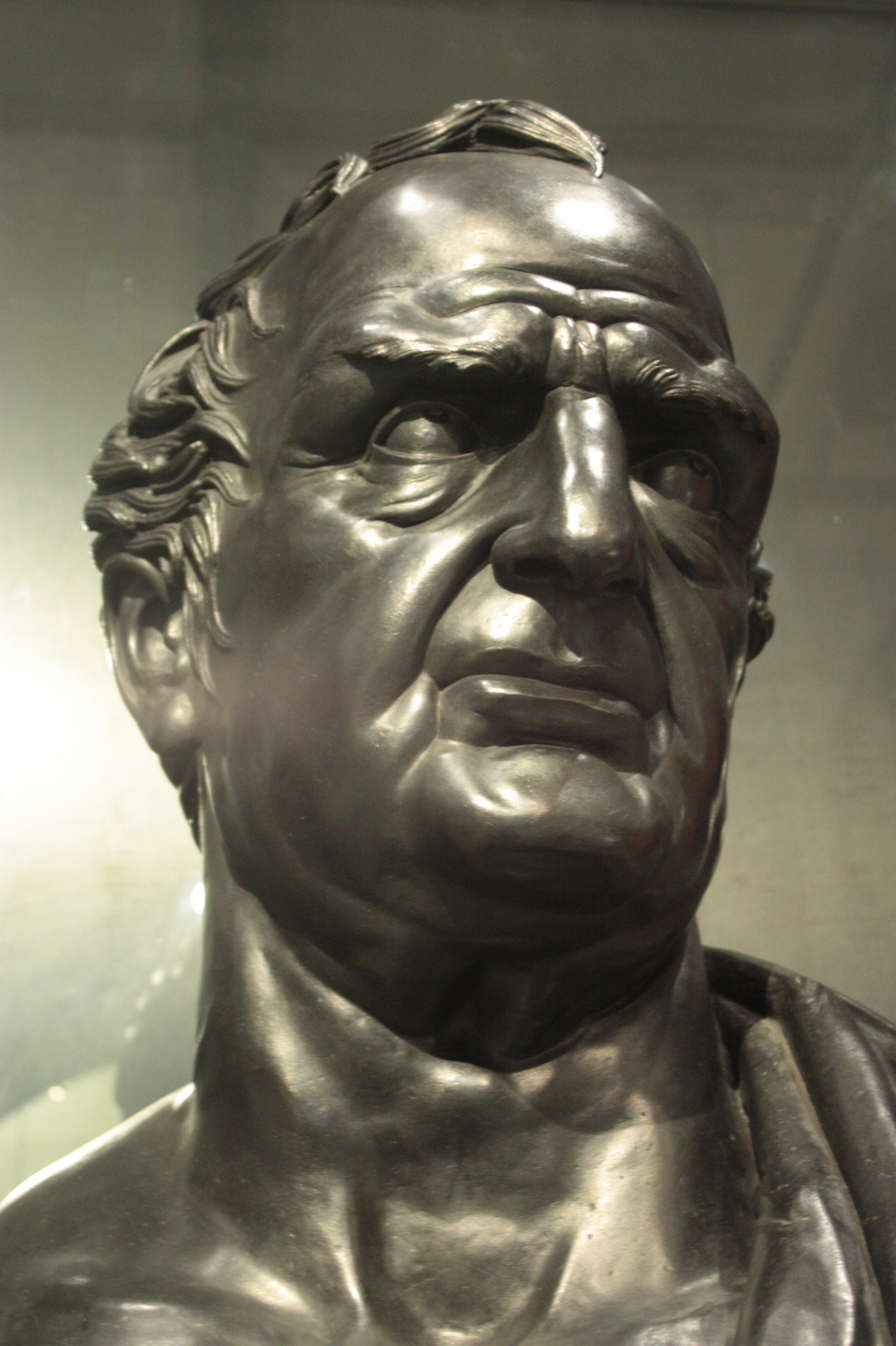
Heroic Bust, Henry Moore by Alexander Stoddart 1992

In 1948, Moore won the International Sculpture Prize at the Venice Biennale. He turned down a knighthood in 1951 because he felt that the bestowal would lead to a perception of him as an establishment figure and that "such a title might tend to cut me off from fellow artists whose work has aims similar to mine". He was, however, appointed a Member of the Order of the Companions of Honour in 1955 and a Member of the Order of Merit in 1963, and received the Erasmus Prize in 1968. He was also a member of both the American Academy of Arts and Sciences and the American Philosophical Society.

He was a trustee of both the National Gallery and Tate Gallery. His proposal that a wing of the latter should be devoted to his sculptures aroused hostility among some artists. In 1975, he became the first president of the Turner Society, which had been founded to campaign for a separate museum in which the whole Turner Bequest might be reunited, an aim defeated by the National Gallery and Tate Gallery.

Given to the City of London by Moore and the Contemporary Art Society in 1967, Knife Edge Two Piece 1962–65 is displayed in Abingdon Street Gardens, opposite the Houses of Parliament, where its regular appearance in the background of televised news reports from Westminster makes it Moore's most prominent piece in Britain. The ownership of Knife Edge Two Piece 1962–65 was disputed until its 2011 acquisition by the Parliamentary Art Collection.

== Art market ==
By the end of his career, Moore was the world's most successful living artist at auction. In 1982, four years before his death, Sotheby's in New York sold a 6-foot (1.8 m) Reclining Figure (1945), for $1.2 million to collector Wendell Cherry. Although a first record of $4.1 million was set in 1990, Moore's market slumped during the recession that followed. In 2012, his eight-foot bronze, Reclining Figure: Festival (1951) sold for a record £19.1 million at Christie's, making him the second most expensive 20th-century British artist after Francis Bacon.

== Gallery ==
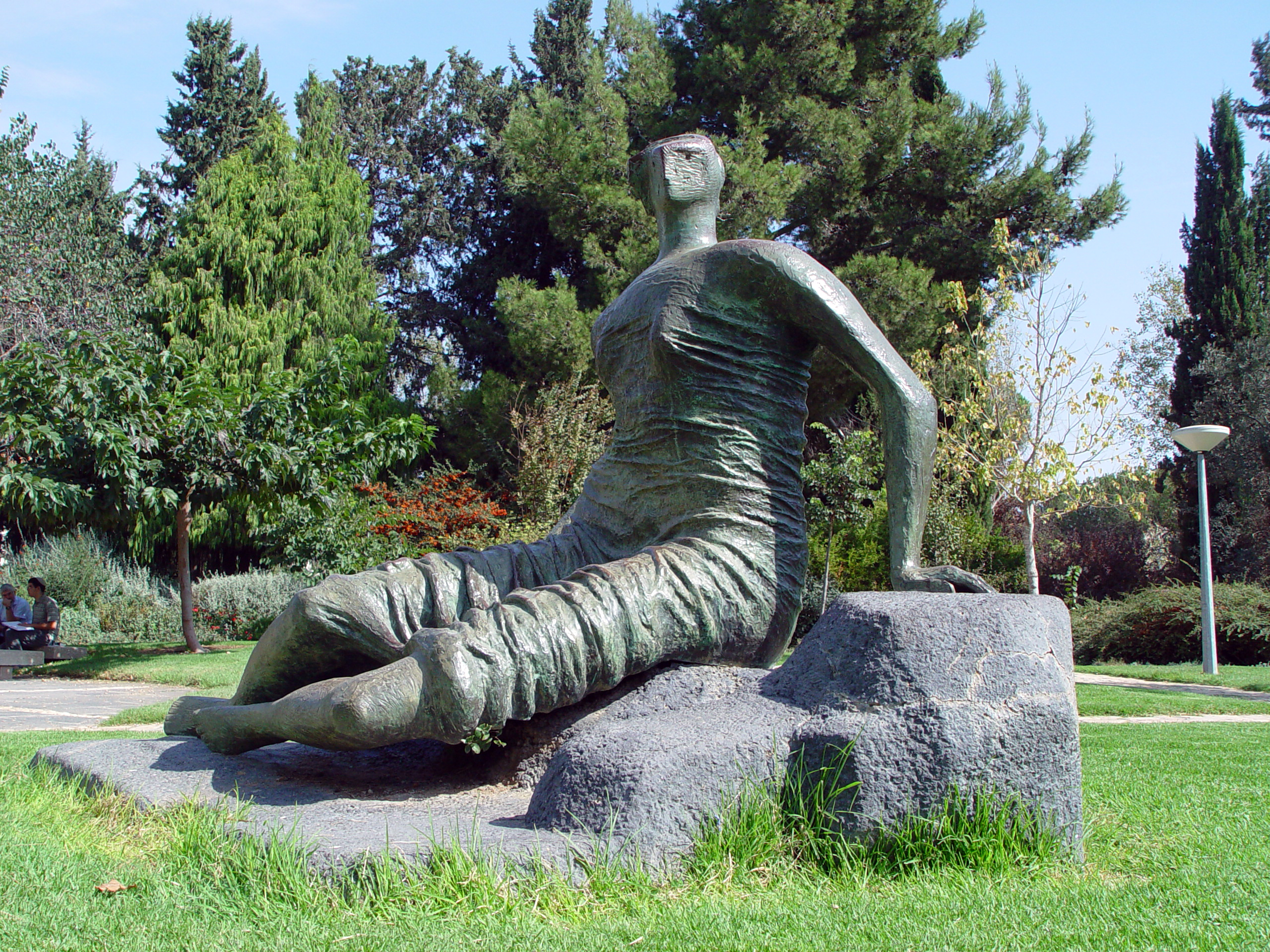
Draped Seated Woman (1957–58), Hebrew University of Jerusalem

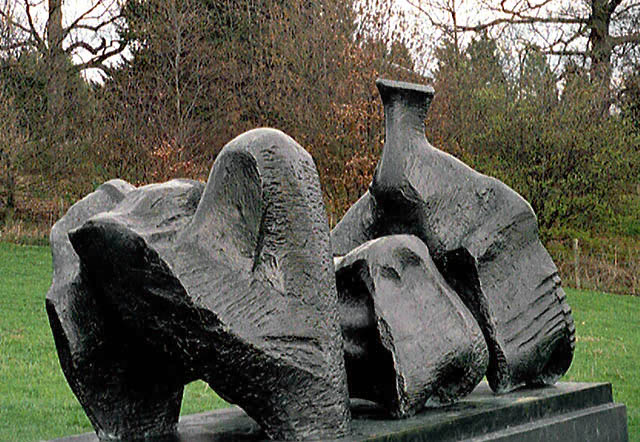
Three Piece Reclining Figure No.1 (1961), Yorkshire Sculpture Park

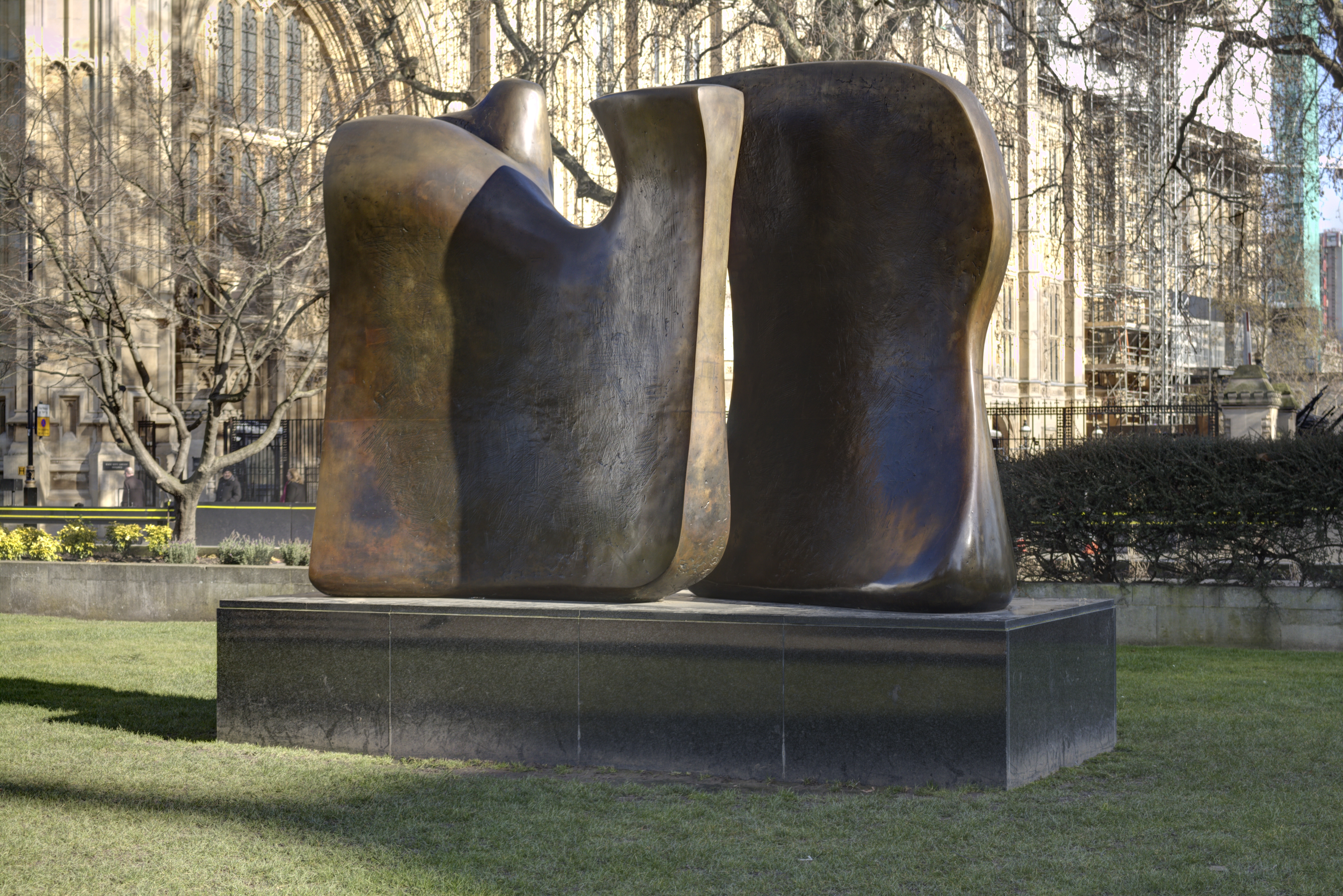
Knife Edge Two Piece (1962–65) (bronze), opposite House of Lords, London

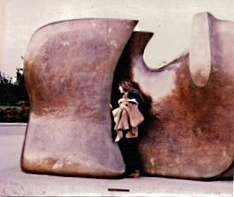
Knife Edge Two Piece (1962–65), Queen Elizabeth Park, Vancouver, B.C., Canada. 1970.

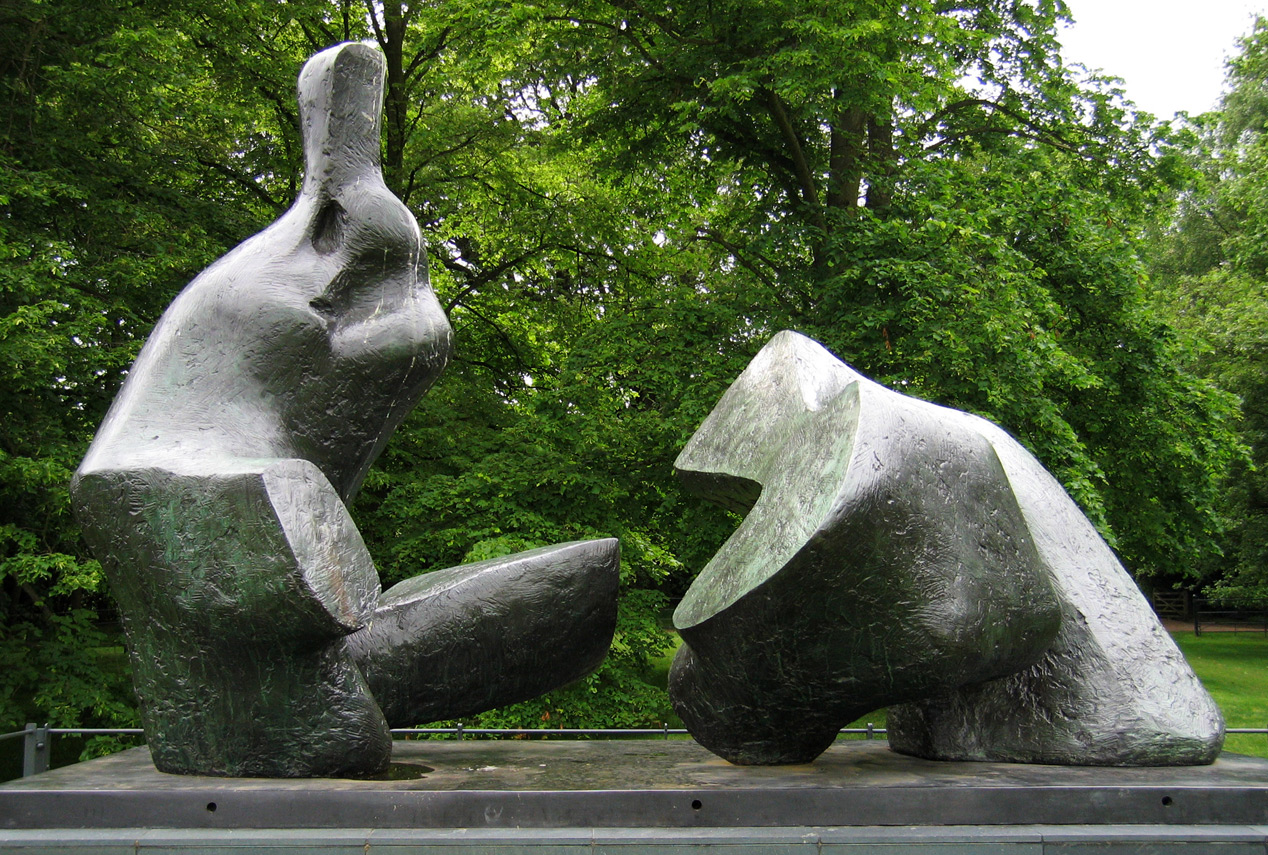
Two Piece Reclining Figure No. 5 (1963–64), bronze, Kenwood House grounds, London

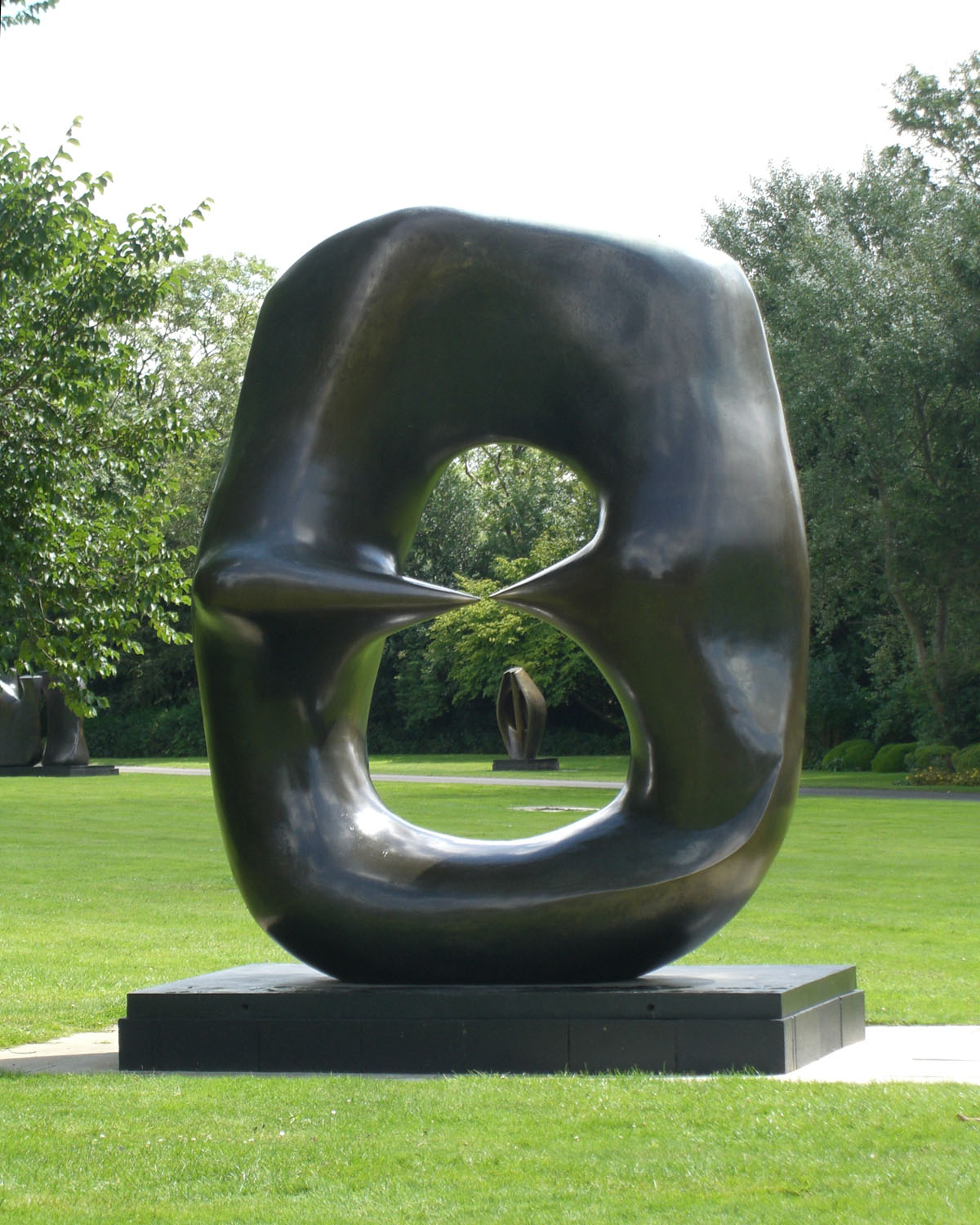
Oval with Points (1968–70), Henry Moore Foundation

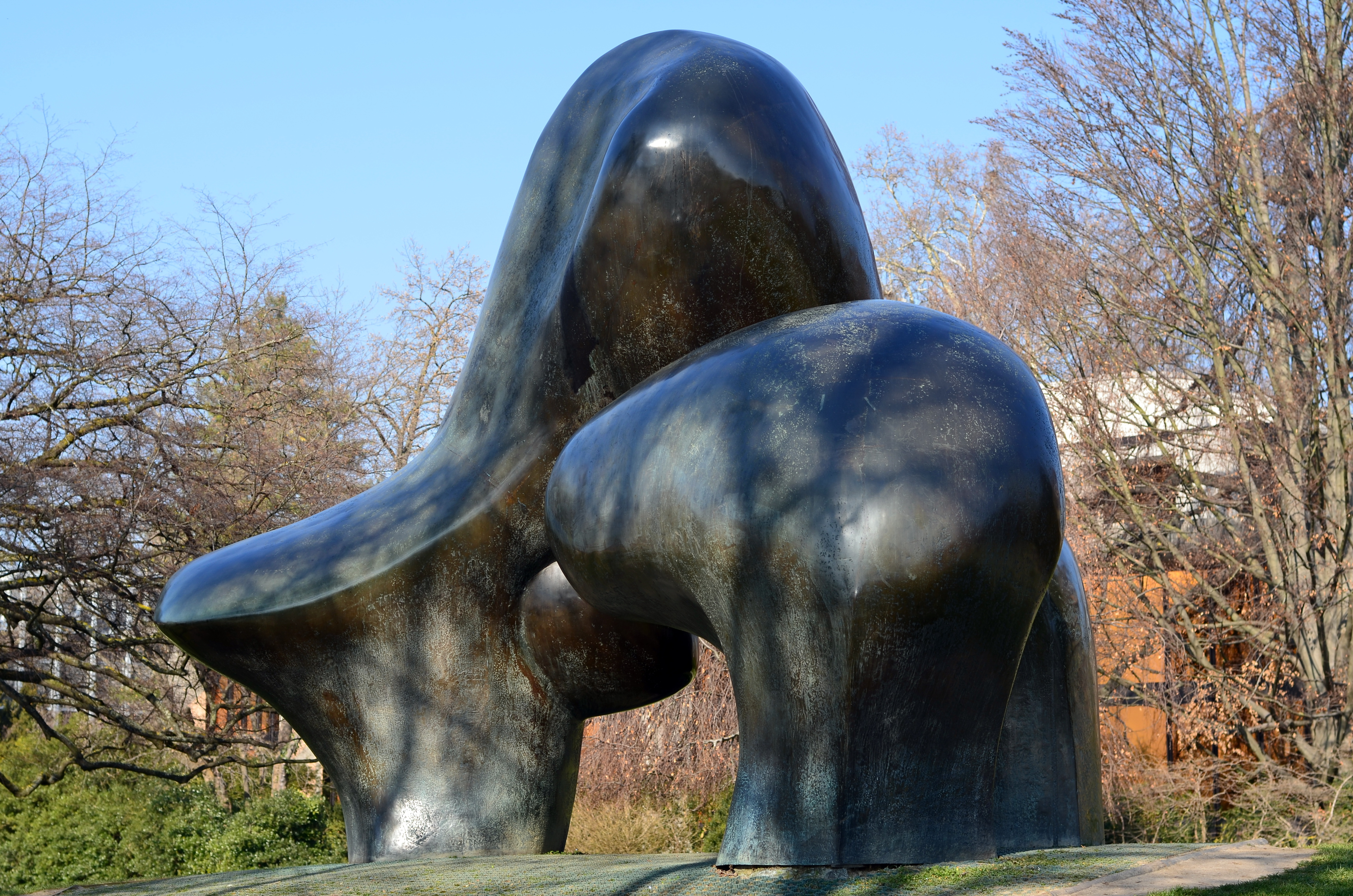
Sheep Piece (1971–72), Zürichhorn, Zürich-Seefeld, Switzerland

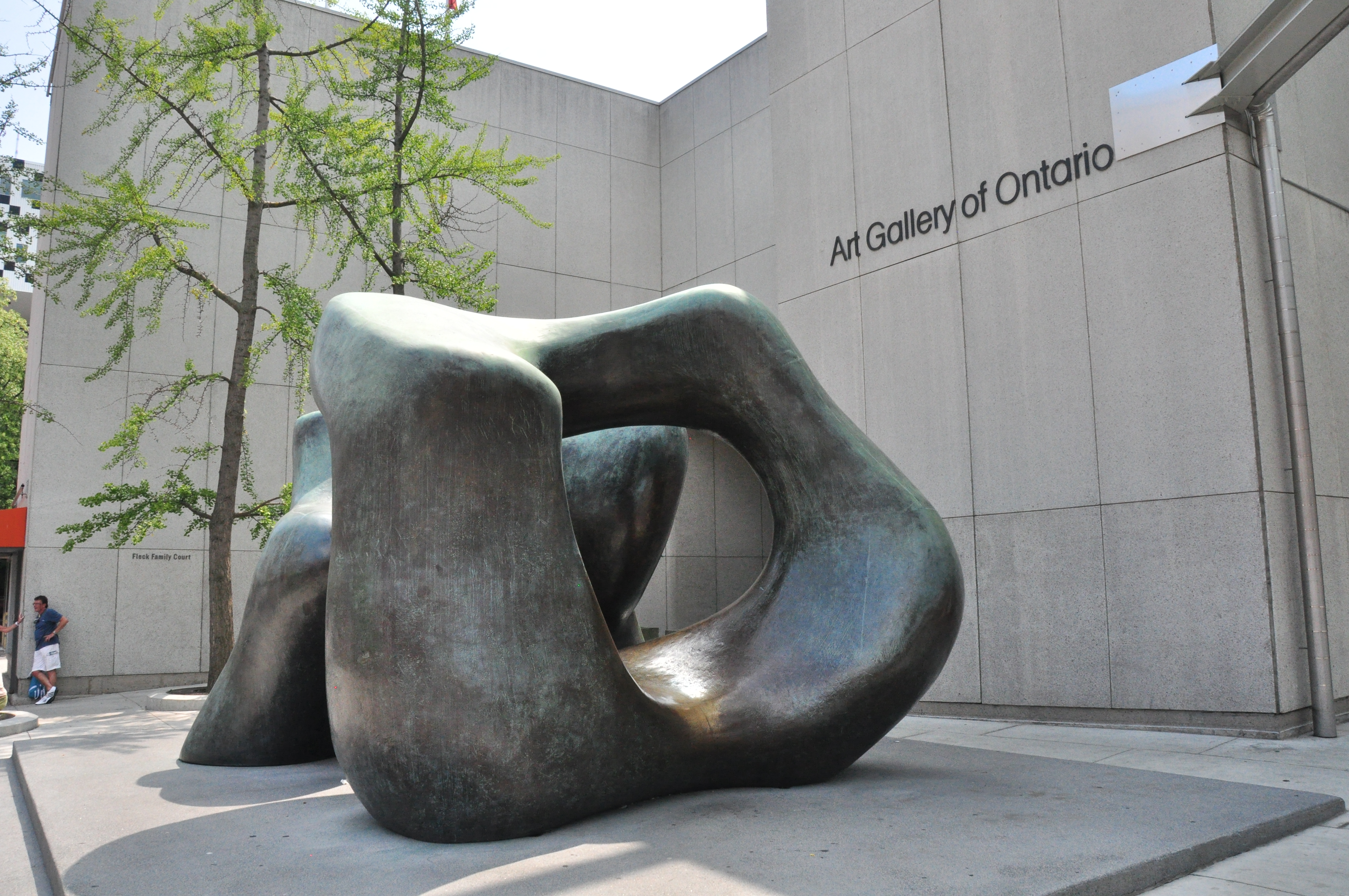
Large Two Forms (1969), Art Gallery of Ontario

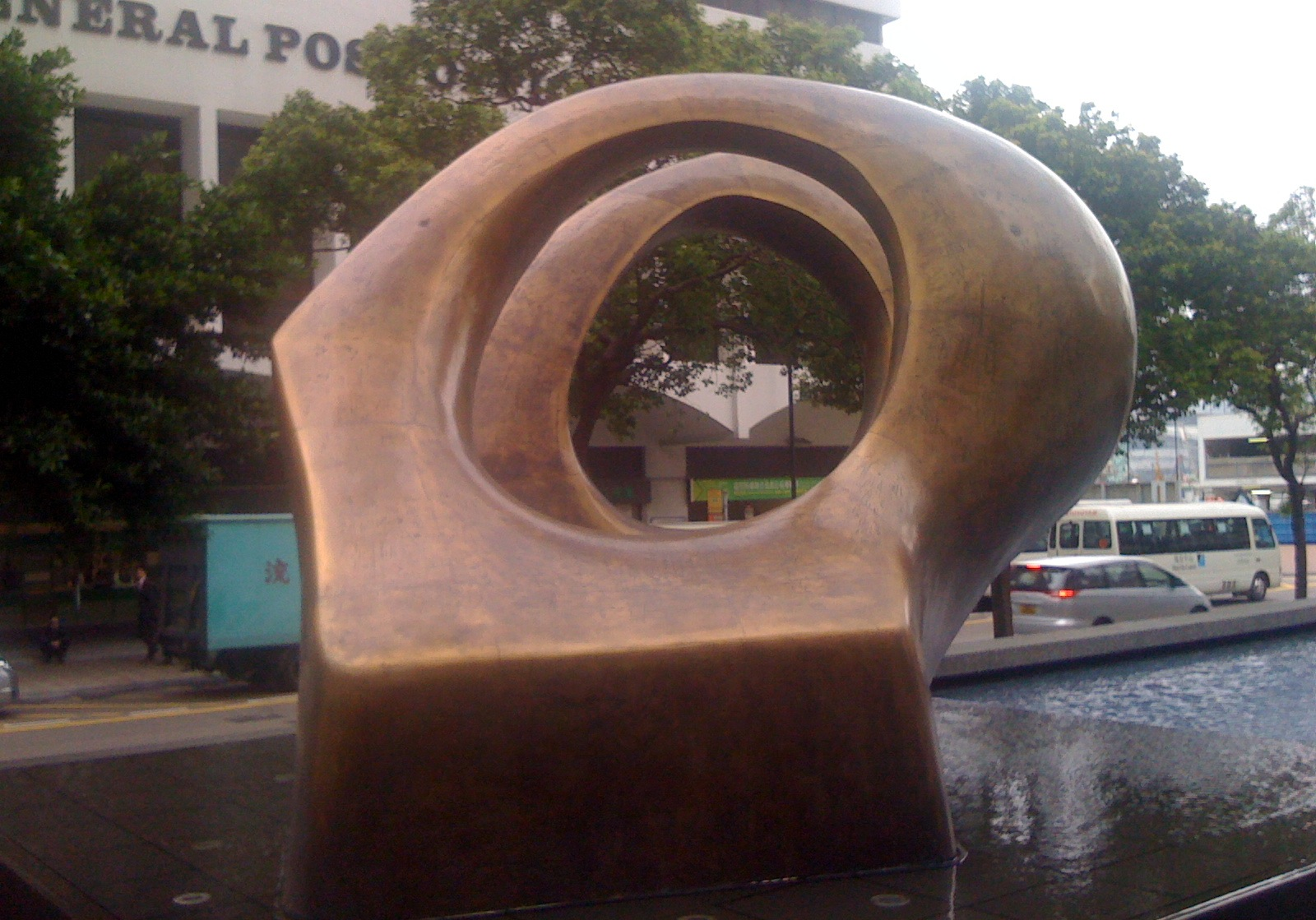
Double Oval (1966), Jardine House, Central, Hong Kong

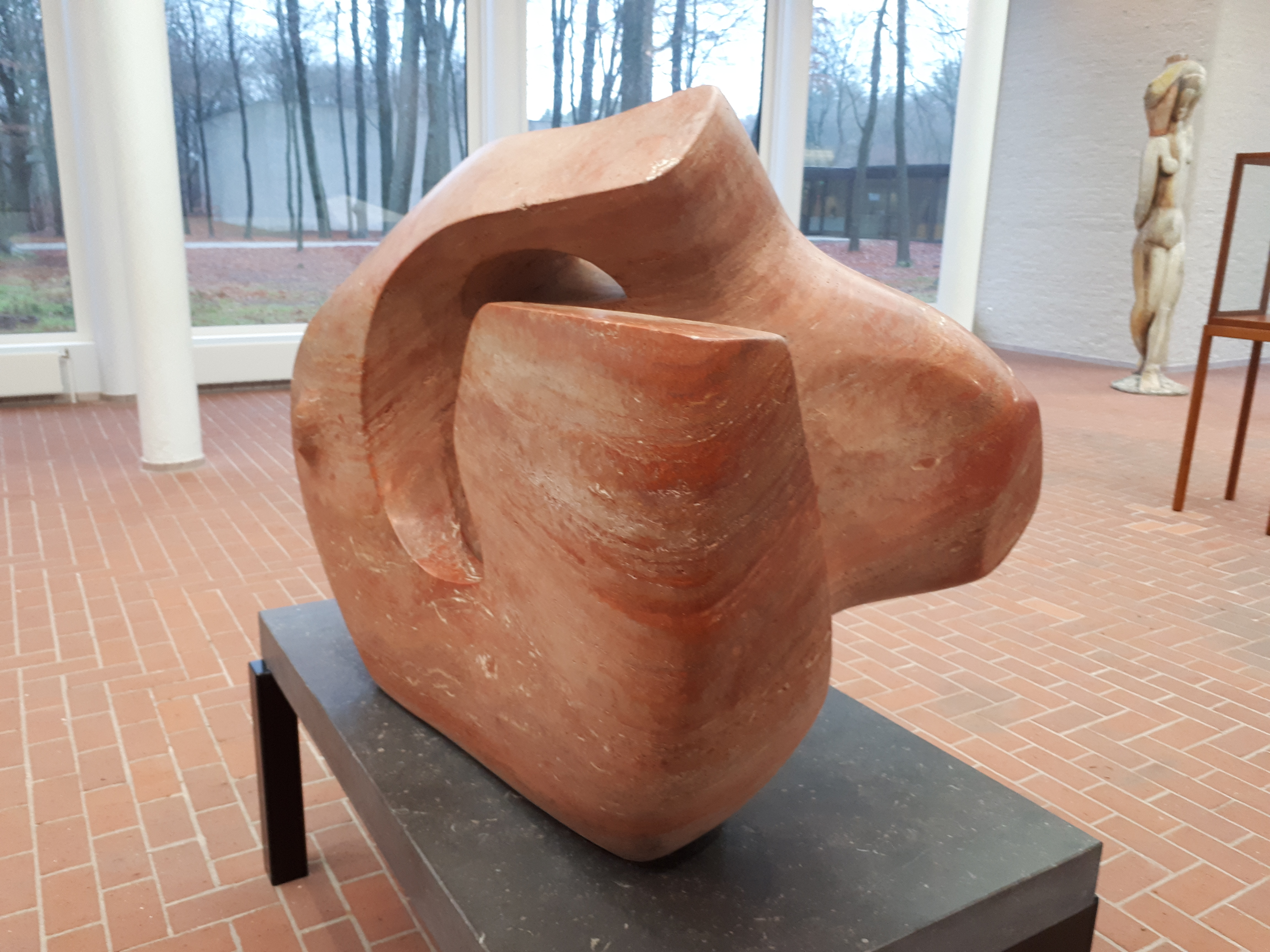
Sculpture with Hole and Light (1967), Kröller-Müller Museum, Otterlo

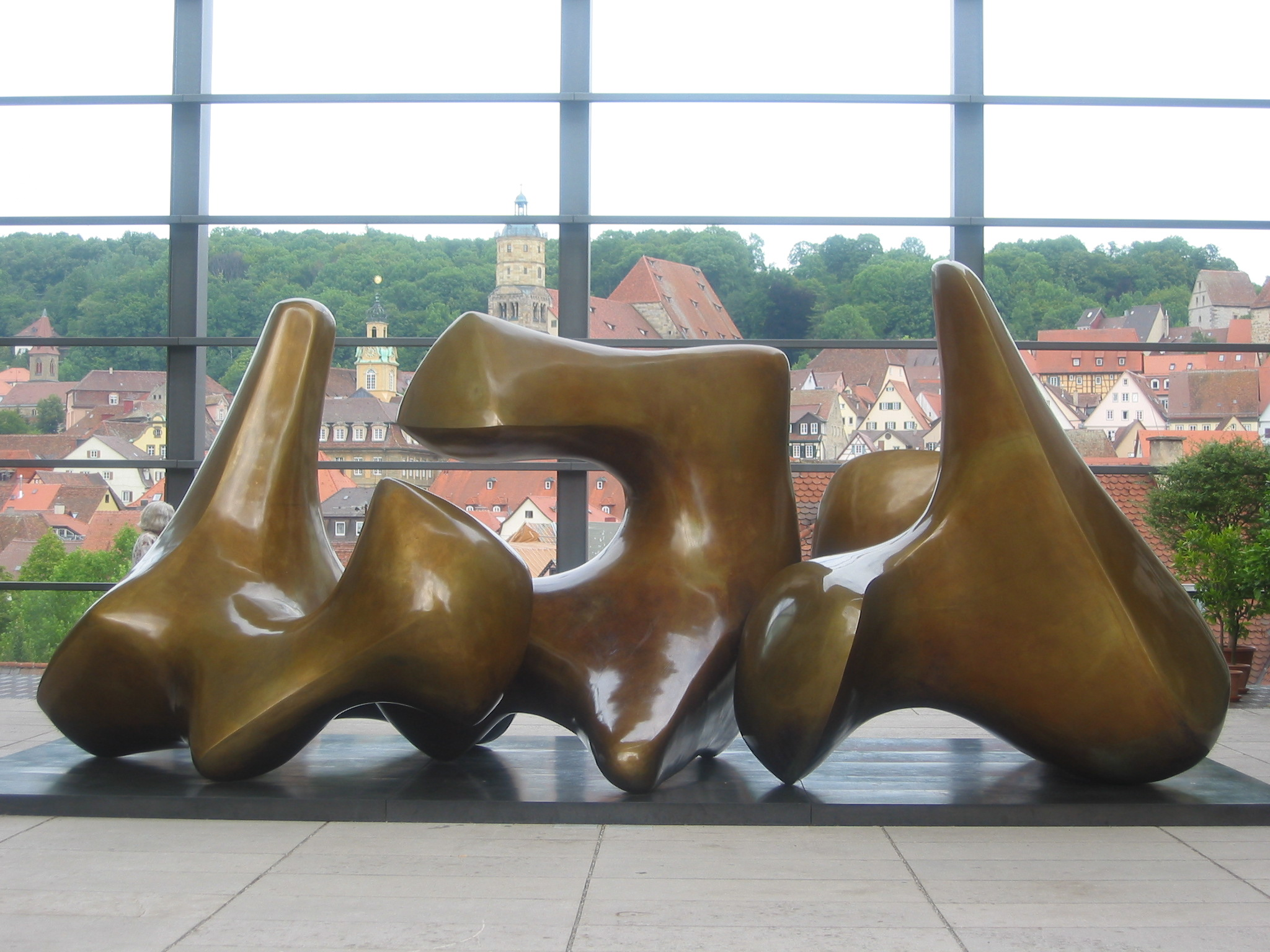
Three Piece Sculpture: Vertebrae (1968–69), Henry Moore, Kunsthalle Würth, 74523 Schwäbish Hall 2005

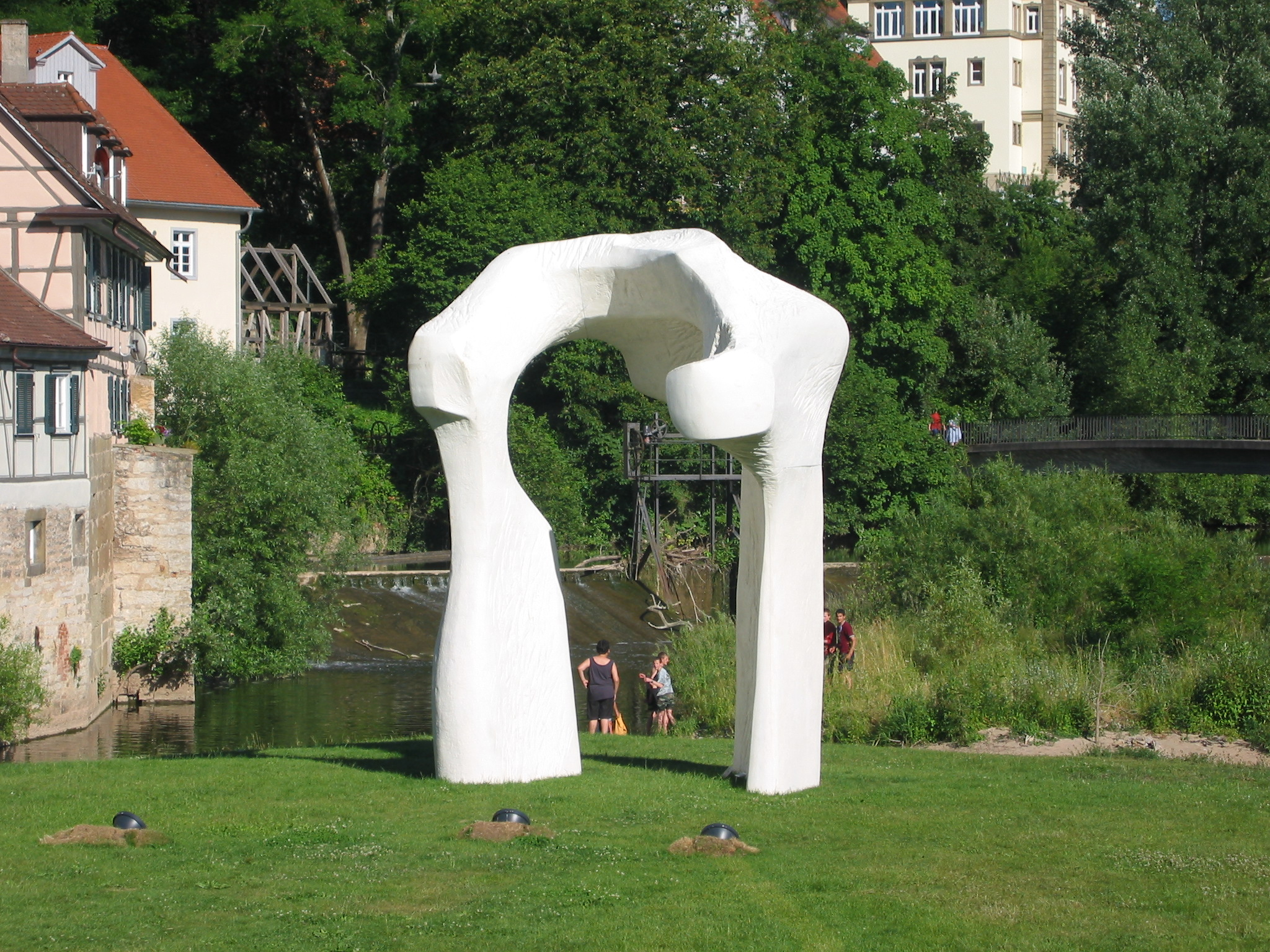
The Arch (1963/69), Henry Moore – Kunst in Schwäbisch Hall

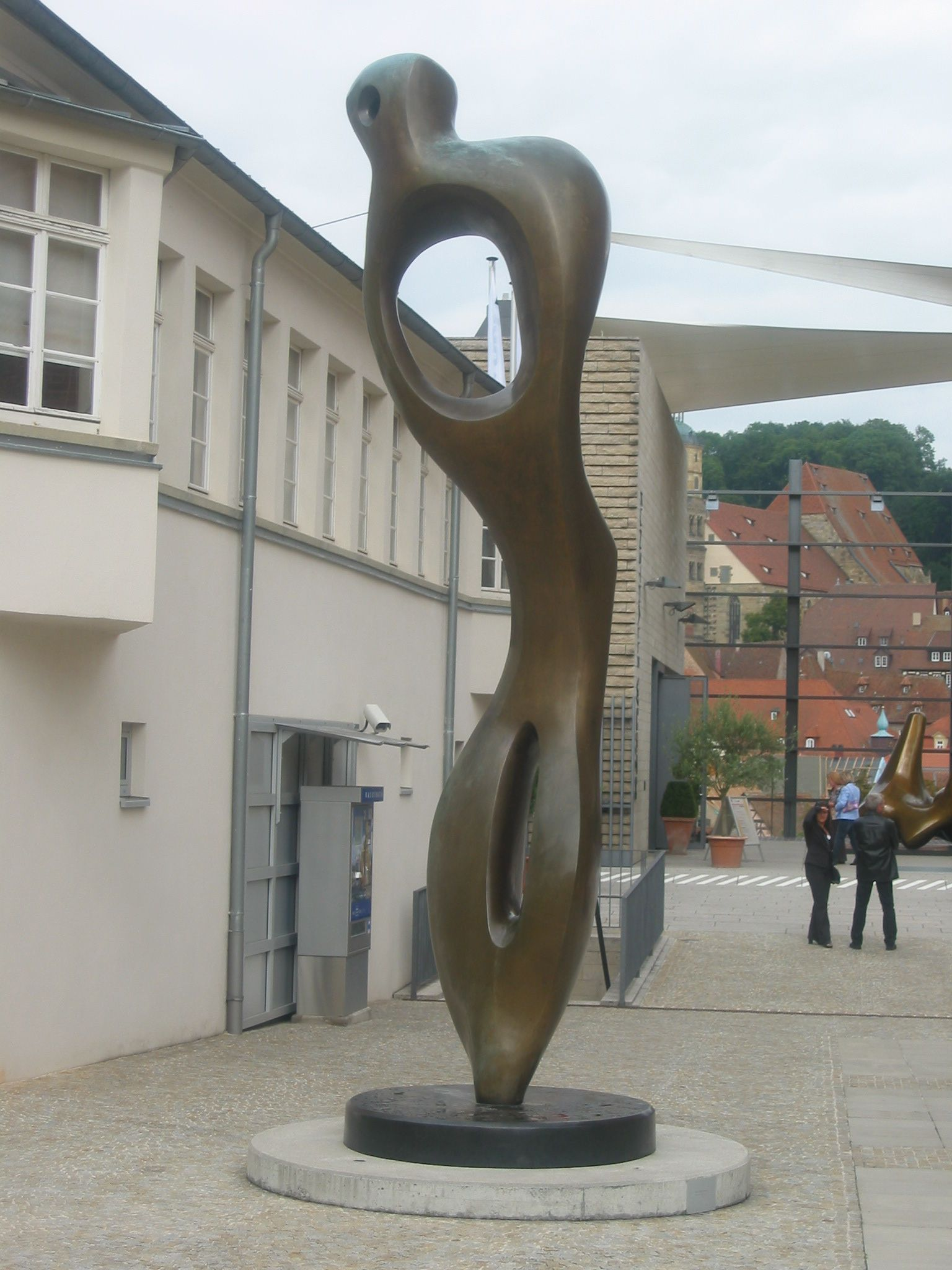
Large Interior Form (1953–54), Henry Moore – Kunst in Schwäbisch Hall

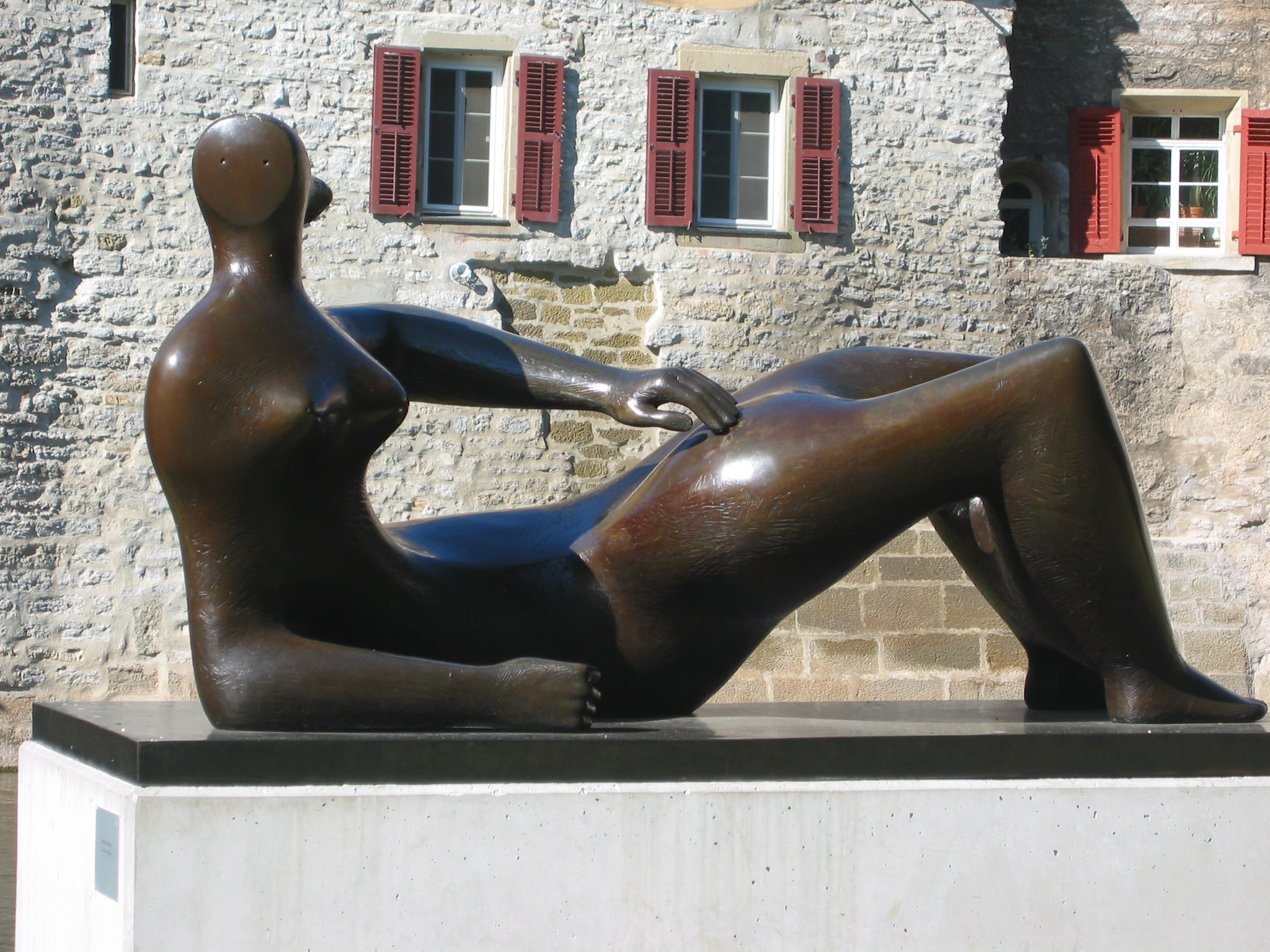
Reclining Figure (1982), Henry Moore – Kunst in Schwäbisch Hall

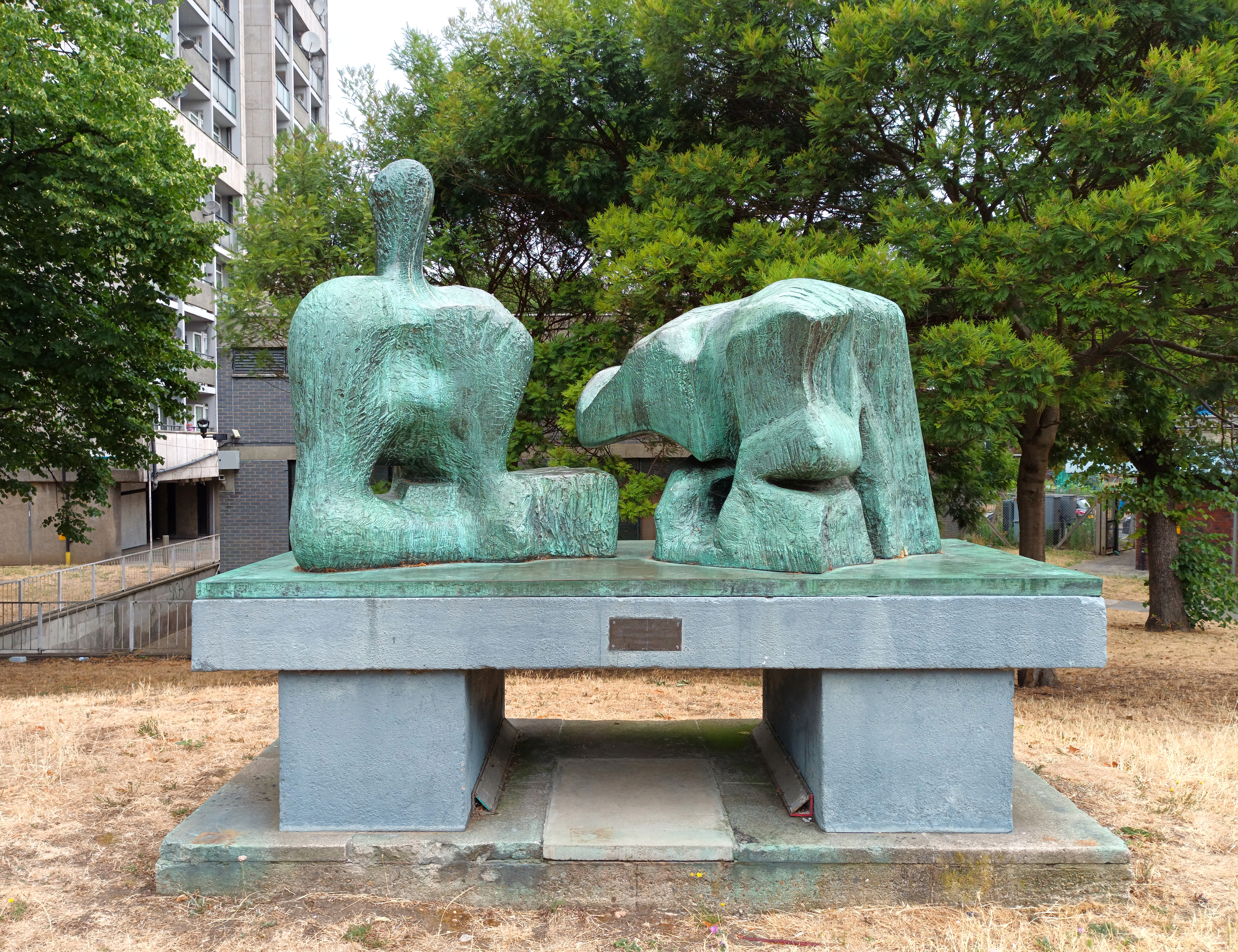
Two Piece Reclining Figure No. 3, Henry Moore, Brandon Estate, Kennington, London

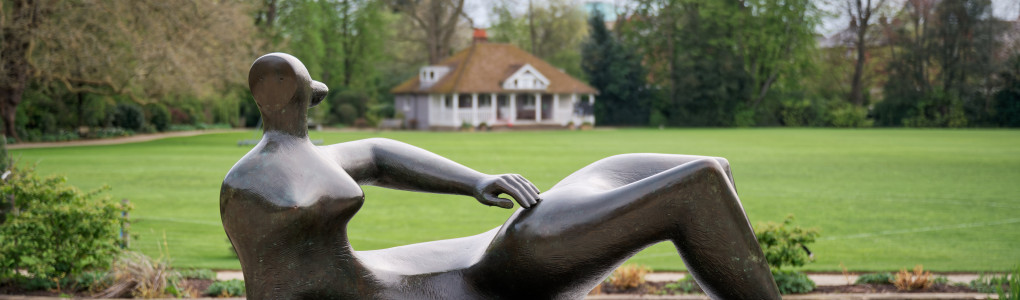
Reclining Figure (1982), Worcester College, Oxford

== See also ==
- List of sculptures by Henry Moore

== Works cited ==
- Beckett, Jane; Russell, Fiona (2003). Henry Moore: Space, Sculpture, Politics. Burlington, Vermont: Ashgate. ISBN 0-7546-0836-0.
- Berthoud, Roger (2003). The Life of Henry Moore (2 ed.). Giles de la Mare. ISBN 978-1-900357-22-7.
- Causey, Andrew (1998). Sculpture Since 1945. Oxford: Oxford University Press. ISBN 0-19-284205-6.
- Grohmann, Will (1960). The Art of Henry Moore. New York: H. N. Abrams.
- Wilkinson, Alan G. (2002). Henry Moore: Writings and Conversations. University of California Press. ISBN 0-520-23161-9.
