= Roland Piché =

British artist (born 1938)

Roland Piché (born 21 November 1938 in Hackney, London) is a British artist and teacher. He is best known for working in the Abstract style across prints and sculptures, and his work appears in international collections in the UK, Brazil, the United States and Sweden.

== Life ==
Piché was born in London in 1938 to parents who were from Montreal. He attended private school but did not enjoy it. He cites the Festival of Britain exhibition in 1951 as the reason he became interested in sculpture.

Piché began to make a name for himself in the 1960s. He studied at Hornsey College of Art from 1956 to 1960 and then the Royal College of Art from 1960 to 1964. He became a part time assistant, working for Henry Moore, in 1963 the same year he exhibited with the New Contemporaries.

He was then invited by Bryan Robertson to show alongside such artists as Phillip King, David Annesley, Michael Bolus, Tim Scott, William Tucker and Isaac Witkin at the New Generation Exhibition at Whitechapel Gallery in 1965. This led to him exhibiting at Marlborough Fine Art in 1967 where he was in contact with Francis Bacon who also influenced his work. This show left an impression on another young British sculptor, Stephen Cox, who described Piché's work as "a three-dimensional version of Francis Bacon."

He was photographed by David Bailey for British Vogue. Over the past fifty years Piché continued to work alongside teaching and has generated over 600 sculptures and 2,000 paintings.

He taught at Maidstone College of Art along with Antony Gormley.

He has refused to become a Royal Academician on two occasions. He is a member of the Royal Society of Sculptors. He retired from teaching in 2003 and in 2010 married Cherie Harvey.

In 2013 he exhibited at Canterbury Cathedral.

== Work ==
Piché's work has been noted for its unique combination of both geometric and organic forms. A cage like element was incorporated in many of his early works, such as Sunset and Deposition in a Space Frame. This feature was contextualised in a 1968 exhibition at MoMA, New York as part of a surrealist tradition and evocated comparisons with Seymour Lipton and Alberto Giacometti. This has been described as working within and against the British Modernist tradition while incorporating elements of what Surrealist André Breton described as 'biomorphic forms'. These forms have also been described as 'figurative illusions'. Many of his sculptures were made with polyester resin, fibreglass, aluminium and bronze. His sculptural forms are said to reference the work of Francis Bacon. Despite making sculptures incorporating organic looking elements, Piché saw himself as working "against nature" while Henry Moore worked "on its side". Other important influences on him have been Constantin Brâncuși, Auguste Rodin and Michelangelo.

His work is held in a number of British collections such as the Tate, Ferens Art Gallery, University of South Wales, the Arts Council and National Museum Wales. In addition his pieces are located internationally in São Paulo Museum of Art, Museum of Modern Art, New York and Gothenburg Museum of Art. He now works from his studio based in Tollesbury.
