= John Read (art film maker) =

British documentary film maker (1923–2011)

John Read (7 January 1923 – 26 July 2011) was a documentary film maker for the BBC from 1951 to 1983.

== Biography ==
John Read was born in Purley in Surrey, England in 1923, to art critic Herbert Read and his wife, Evelyn (née Roff) Read.

The family moved to Scotland in 1931 when Herbert took up the position of Watson Gordon Professor of Fine Art at the University of Edinburgh. The marriage of Read's parents had been on shaky ground for several years, and they finally split in acrimonious and somewhat scandalous circumstances in 1933. Herbert Read moved to London while Evelyn and John remained in Edinburgh. As his mother became increasingly ill with a debilitating form of paranoia, John spent much of his youth in the city's cinemas, and his desire to become a film maker himself was apparent by the time he was 18 years old.

When he was called up for military service in 1941 his father tried unsuccessfully to get him a position in the RAF Film Unit, but managed to persuade filmmaker George Hollering to let John work as a camera assistant on his film Message of Canterbury, made for the British Council in 1942.

In 1948, John Read began working for the Scottish documentary maker John Grierson, who had been placed in charge of the Film Unit at the government's Central Office of Information. He then moved into the BBC, and in 1951 he directed the BBC's first ever film about a living artist, Henry Moore. This half-hour film followed the creation of Moore's sculpture Reclining Figure as it was made for the Festival of Britain. It was followed by 12 more films on contemporary artists for the BBC over the next six years, and in 1960 John began a pioneering series of films on artists called The Artists Speaks. This series was the first to allow artists to talk about their work directly on camera.

He remained a producer at the BBC until retirement in 1983. As fellow film maker Philip Bonham Carter has said of him: 'His films were truly about the artists and not about himself.' The motivation for this approach, Read said at his retirement, was simple: 'you've got to stand up for the imaginative world'.

== Death ==
John Read died in London on 26 July 2011, aged 88.

== Family ==
The writers Piers Paul Read and Ben Read are his half-brothers.
