= Knife Edge =

Knife Edge, Knife-edge, or Knife's Edge may refer to:

== Arts ==
- Knife Edge: Chasing Michelin Stars, a 2025 docuseries
- Knife Edge (film), a 2009 British thriller about gaslighting
- "Knife-Edge" (Emerson, Lake & Palmer song)
- Knife Edge: Nose Gunner, a video game
- Young Sherlock Holmes: Knife Edge, a 2003 book in the Young Sherlock Holmes series
- Standing Figure: Knife Edge, a bronze sculpture by Henry Moore
- Knife Edge Two Piece 1962–65, an abstract bronze sculpture by Henry Moore
- Knife Edge, a 2004 novel in the Noughts & Crosses series
- "Knife Edge", a song by The Alarm from Strength

== Places ==
- Knife's Edge, a bridge in the Zambezi River near Victoria Falls in Zambia
- Knife Edge, a hiking trail on Mount Katahdin, ME, US

== Others ==
- Knife-edge effect, a redirecting of radiation from striking an obstacle
- Knife-edge flight, a radio controlled aerobatic maneuver
- Knife-edge scanning microscope
- On a Knife Edge (documentary), a 2017 film about Native Americans
- Knife-edge measurement in statistics
