= Parliamentary Art Collection =

Art collection of the British Parliament

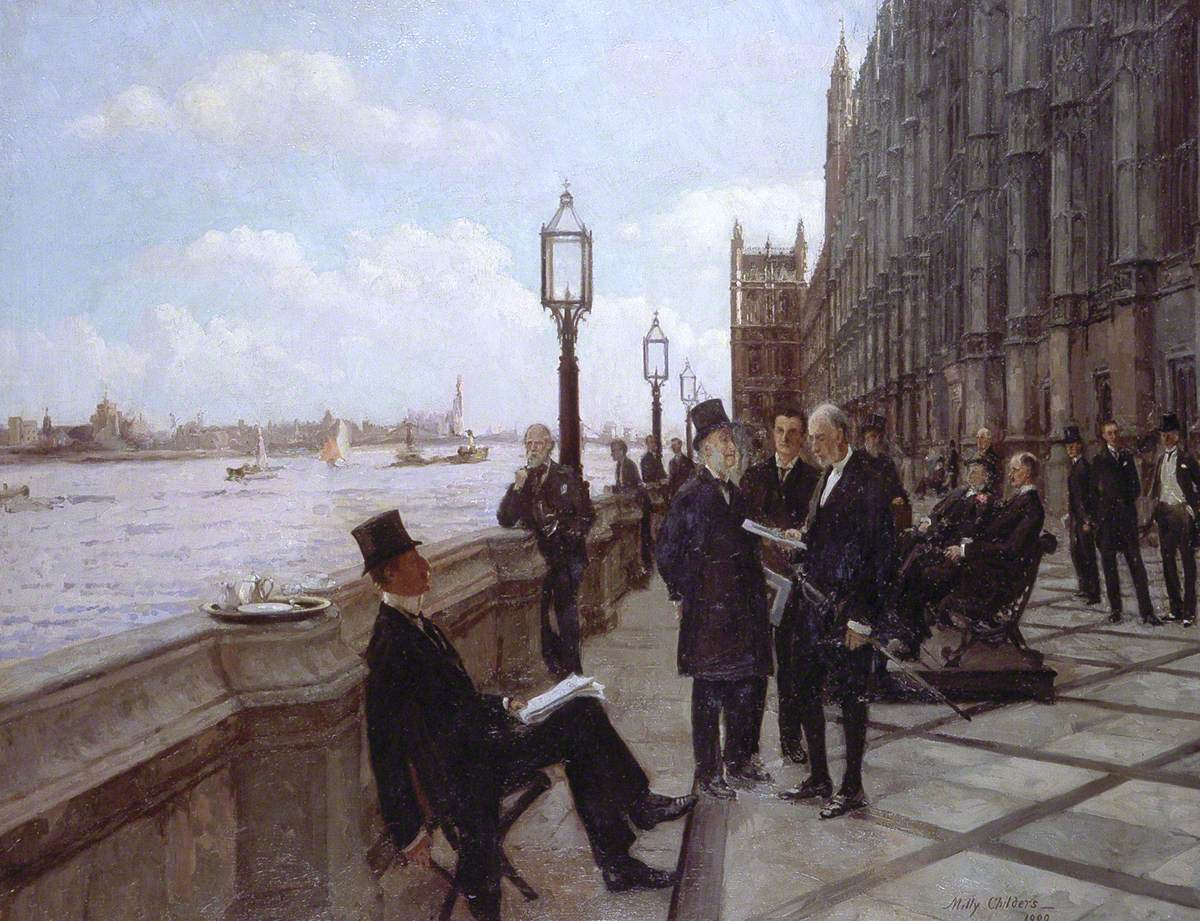
The Terrace, 1909, by Milly Childers (1909)

The Parliamentary Art Collection is a collection of around 8,500 artworks held by the United Kingdom Parliament. The works are jointly owned by the House of Commons and the House of Lords. Approximately 80% of the collection is displayed at the Palace of Westminster and associated buildings of the Parliamentary Estate nearby, but not government buildings in Whitehall, or Downing Street.

The collection includes around 7,000 paintings, drawings and other images, 700 sculptures, 600 coins and medals, and around 100 pieces in other media, such as textiles or wallpaper, with a focus mainly on British history and politics, including portrait paintings and statues of Members of Parliament, members of the House of Lords and other historical figures, and paintings of important events. As a rule, no portrait is displayed at the Palace of Westminster until the subject has been dead for at least 10 years, but works considered ineligible for the main building (for example, portraits of Shirley Williams and of Kenneth Clarke which were acquired in 2007) can be displayed elsewhere on the Parliamentary Estate, such as at 1 Parliament Street or in Portcullis House.

The earliest pieces in the collection are 14 medieval statues of kings in Westminster Hall, dated to c.1388 during the reign of Richard II, while the oldest picture is an ink drawing of the Palace of Westminster by Jan Lievens, c.1630, but most works date from the 18th century onwards. It includes many works selected by the Royal Fine Art Commission decorate the reconstructed Palace of Westminster after the catastrophic fire in 1834, which destroyed many historic artworks and tapestries. The new works include many large formal paintings for the public rooms, and statues of kings and queens around the exterior of the building. The Parliamentary Art Collection has a bronze statue of St Andrew from the cupola of the Parliamentary War Memorial, and in 2011 the Parliamentary Art Collection took responsibility for maintaining the cast of Henry Moore's Knife Edge Two Piece 1962–65, displayed on College Green.

There is an Advisory Committee on Works of Art, with a panel of advisers for the Speaker of the House of Commons and the Lord Speaker, alongside the Speaker's Advisory Committee on Works of Art established in 1954 and the Lord Speaker's Advisory Panel on Works of Art. A Curator's Office was established in 1981. The budget to acquire new works was £75,000 in 2019. Separately, the Speaker's Art Fund is a charity founded in 1929 which acquires works of art for the House of Commons.

Examples of works from the Parliamentary Art Collection

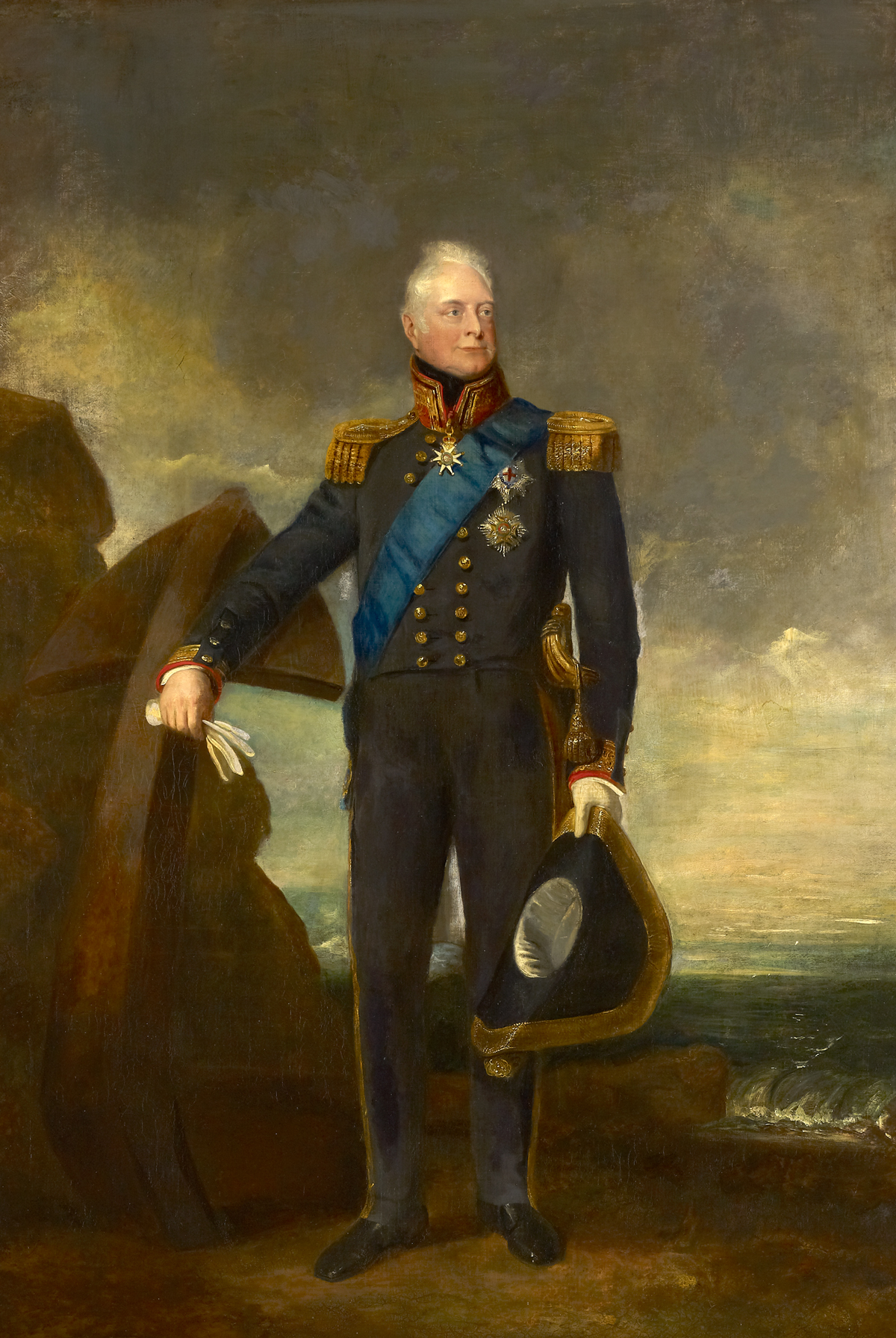
Portrait of William IV, artist and date unknown

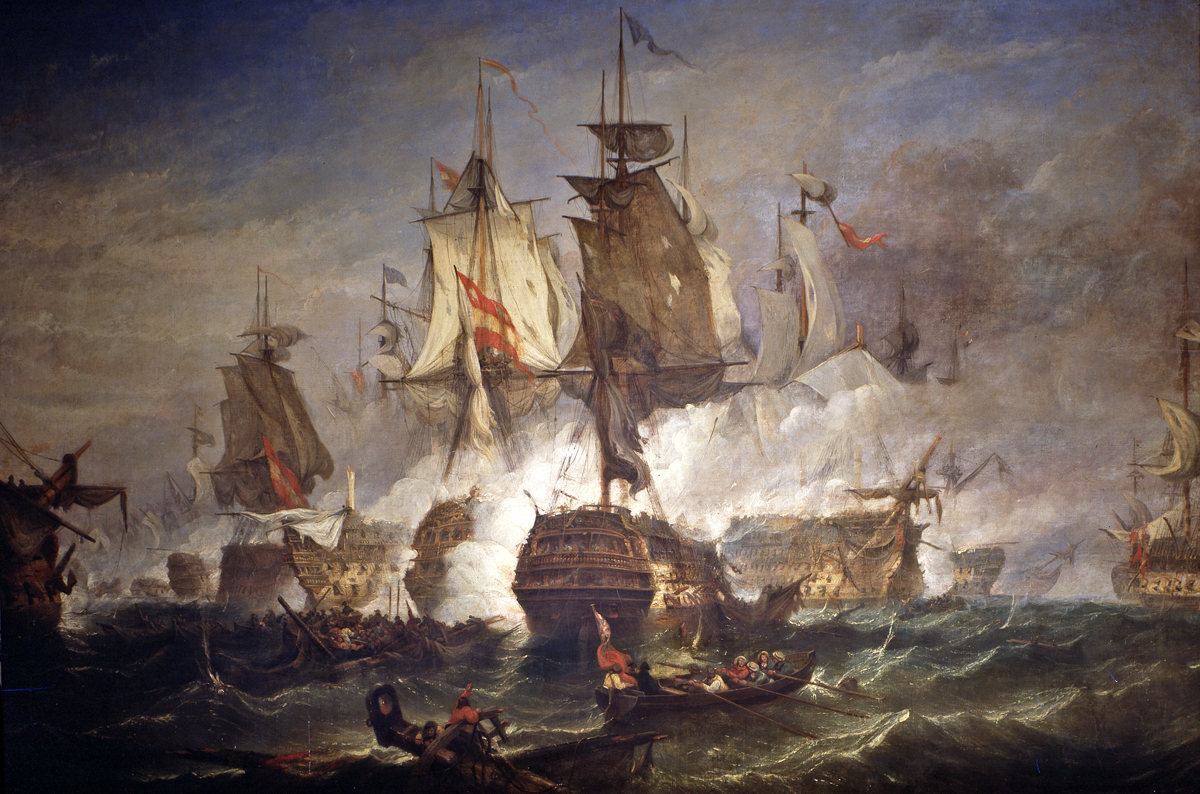
Battle off Cape St Vincent, 1797, by William Adolphus Knell (1846)

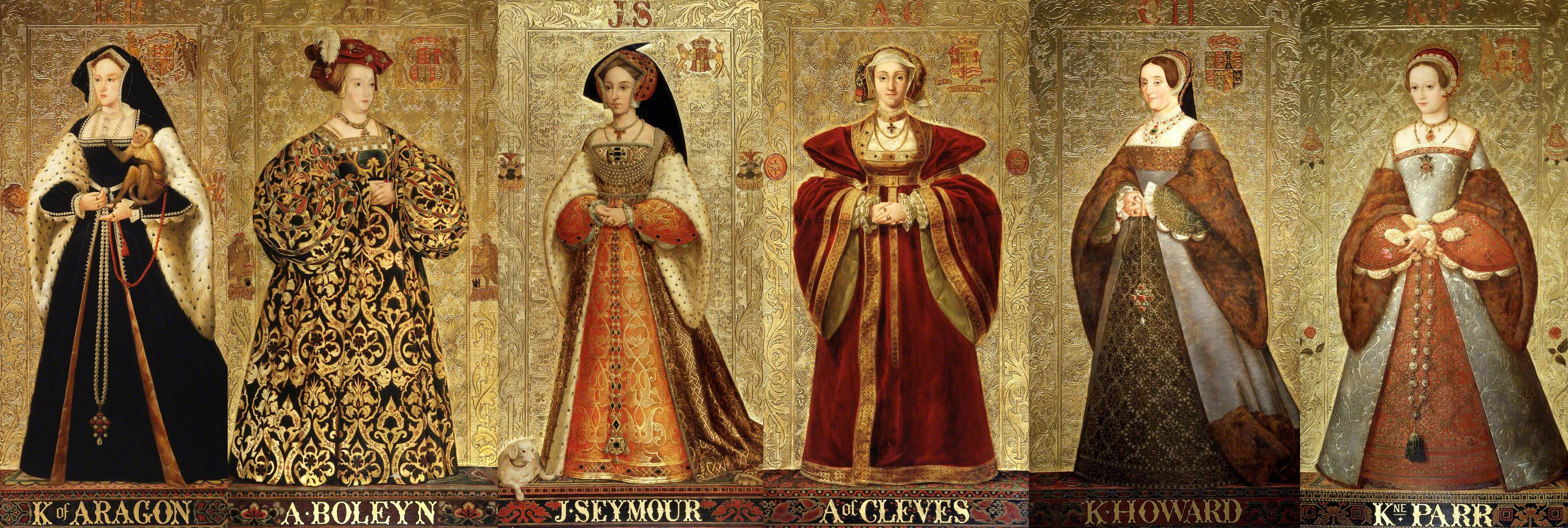
The Wives of Henry VIII by (circle of) Richard Burchett (1854–1860)

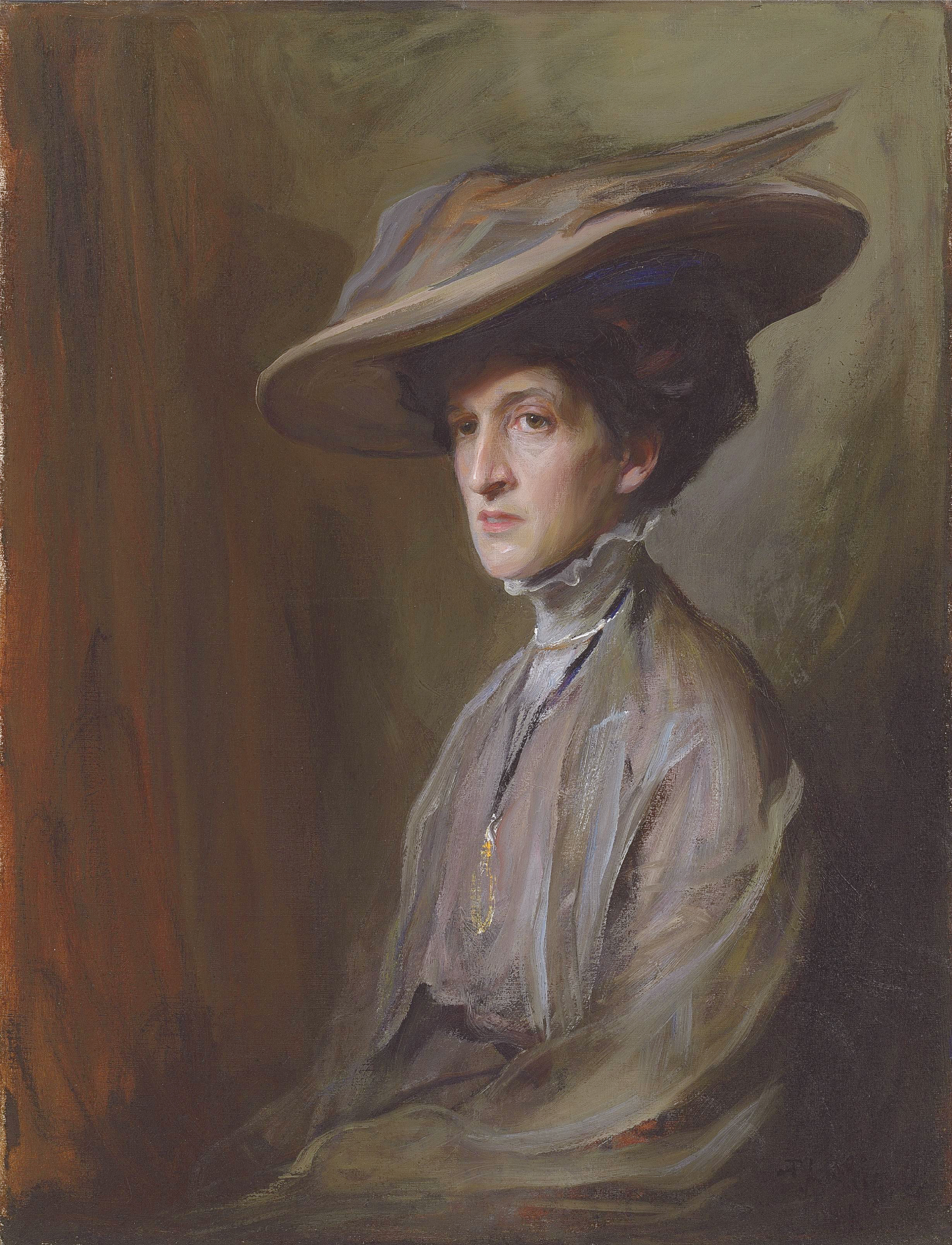
Portrait of Margot Asquith, by Philip de László (1909)

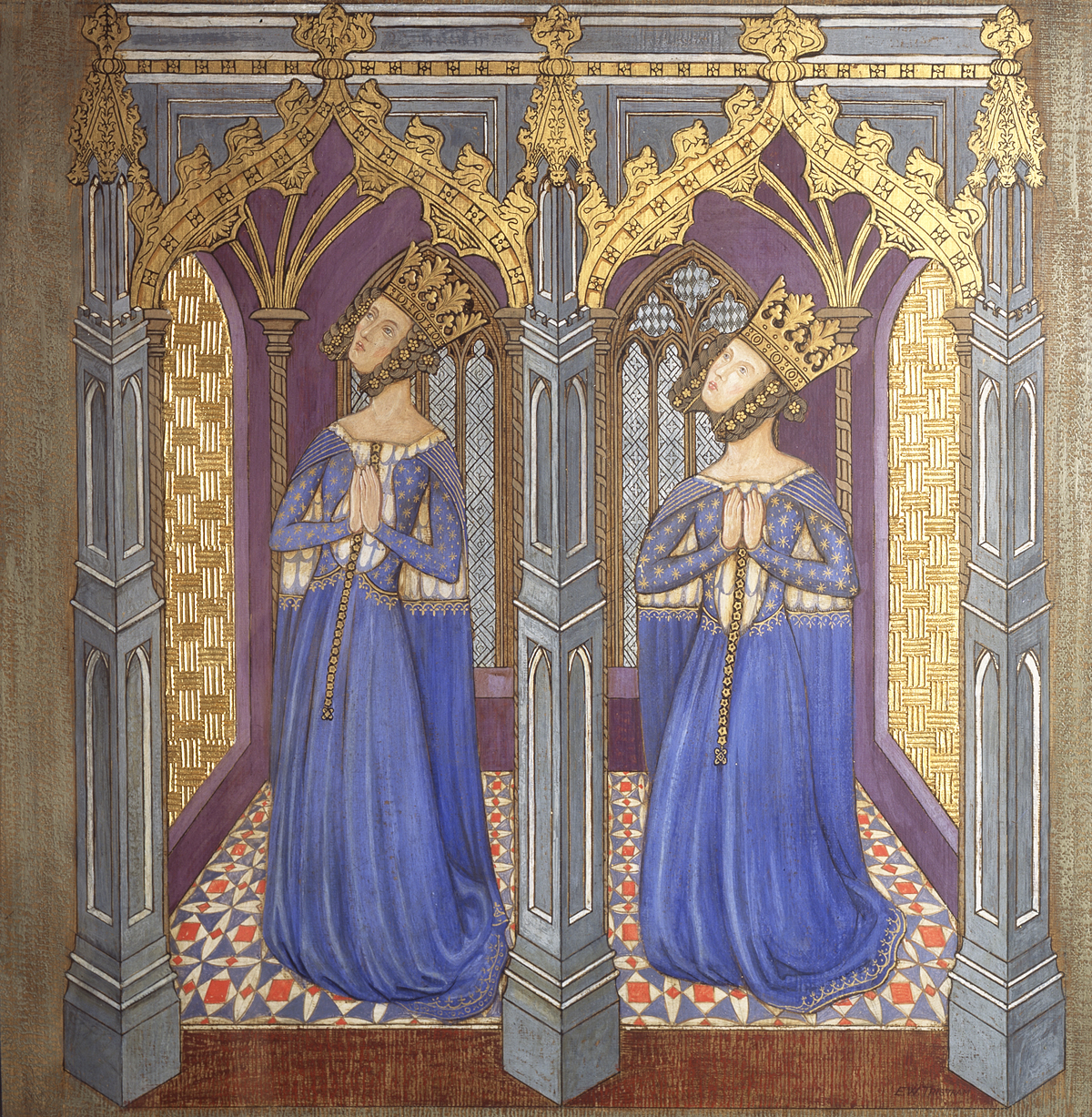
Reconstruction of a medieval mural painting, possibly Queen Philippa and her daughter, by Ernest William Tristram (1927)

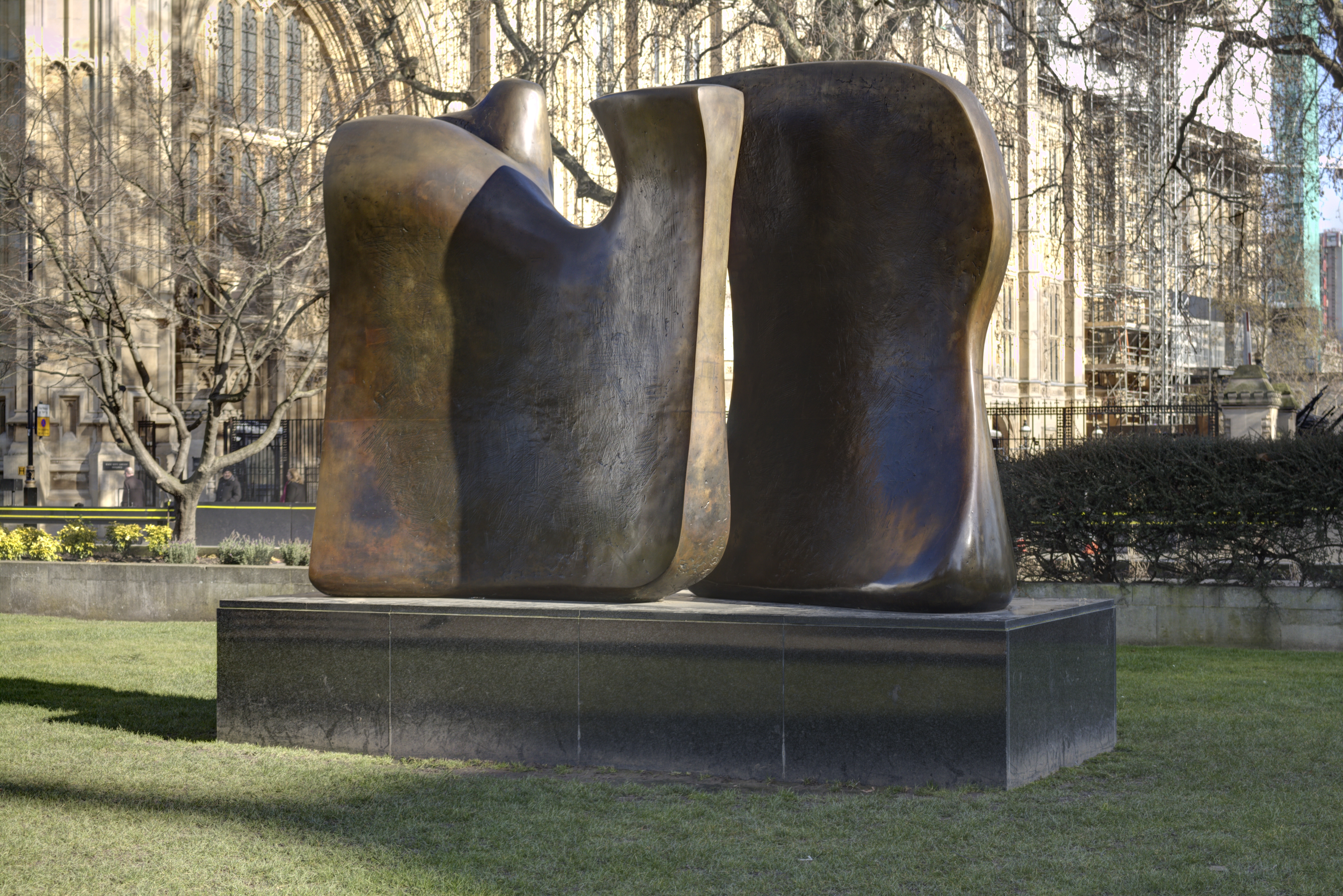
Cast of Knife Edge Two Piece 1962–65, by Henry Moore (1962-1965)

== See also ==
- Government Art Collection
- Royal Collection
