= David Erskine (serjeant-at-arms) =

Scottish military officer and Serjeant at Arms of the House of Commons

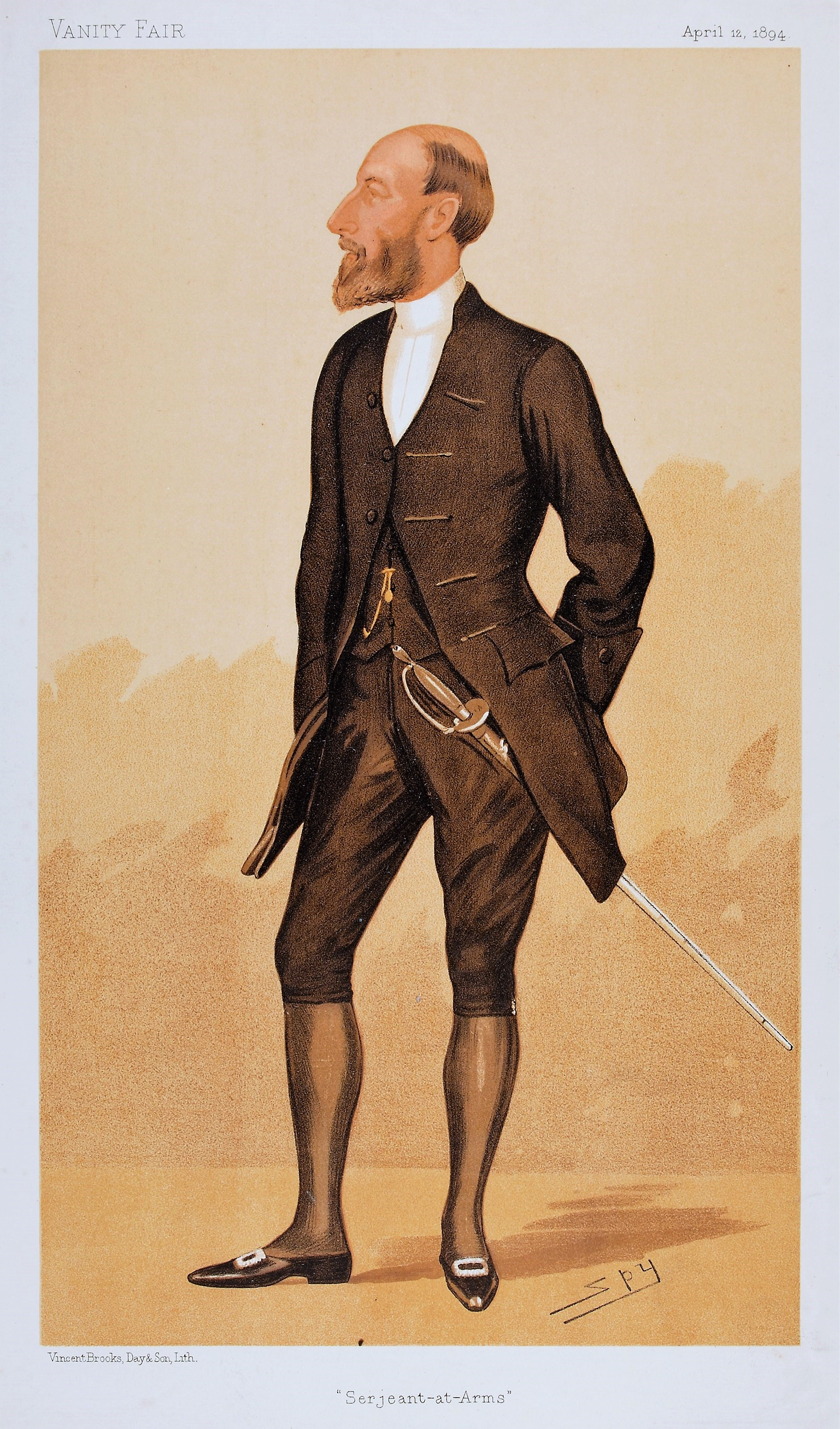
David Erskine caricatured by Spy, Vanity Fair, 12 April 1894

Capt. Sir Henry David Erskine of Cardross KCVO JP DL (5 January 1838 – 7 September 1921) was a Scottish military officer and courtier who was the Serjeant-at-Arms of the House of Commons from 1885–1915.

== Early life and education ==
Erskine was born in Bombay, the eldest son of James Elphinstone Erskine (1804–1844) and Mary Eliza Fagan, daughter of Lt.-Gen. Christopher Fagan. His branch of the family descended from the second Lord Cardross (his father's great-grandfather) and the Earls of Buchan. His father's mother was the daughter of the 11th Lord Elphinstone. Admiral of the Fleet Sir James Elphinstone Erskine was his younger brother, born just 11 months after him. His uncle was Admiral John Erskine.

His father died in 1844. In 1847, David succeeded his grandfather as laird of Cardross in Stirlingshire. Erskine was educated at Harrow School.

== Career ==
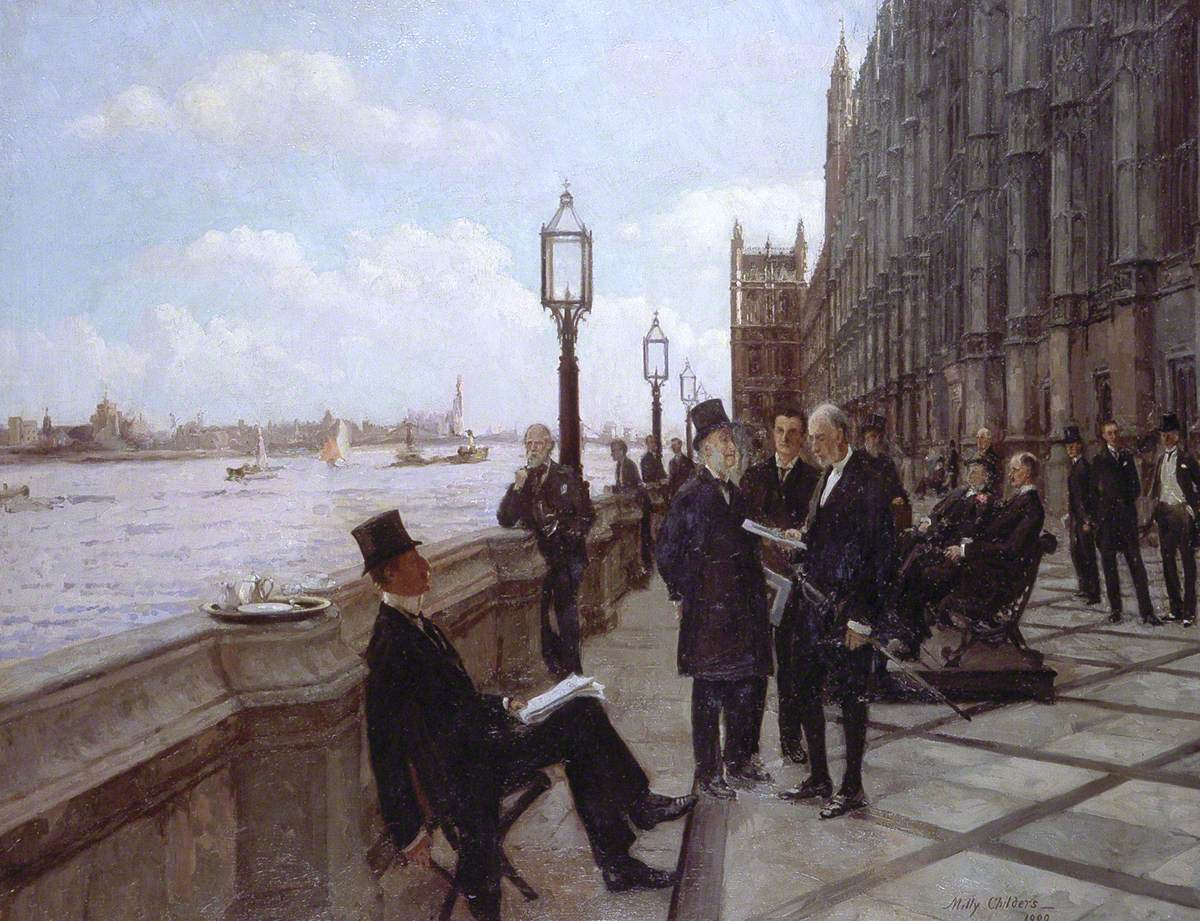
Erskine, holding the sword, depicted in The Terrace, 1909 by Milly Childers

Erskine entered the British Army in 1854 and served in the Crimean War with the 30th (Cambridgeshire) Regiment of Foot and the Scots Fusilier Guards. He retired from the army in 1861.

From 1875–1885, he served as Deputy Serjeant-at-Arms for the House of Commons. He spent the next three decades as Serjeant-at-Arms, retiring in 1915. Though his role was largely ceremonial, in May 1881 he was required to physically remove Charles Bradlaugh, whom a committee had voted to remove because of his refusal to take the oath. He was also tasked with removing the suffragettes Helen Fox and Muriel Matters during the famed "grille incident" of 28 October 1908, when they chained themselves to the Ladies Gallery of the House.

He was appointed a Commander of the Royal Victorian Order in 1901. He was knighted in the same order in 1911 Coronation Honours.

He served as a Groom of the Robes to Queen Victoria from 1870 until her death in 1901. From 1901 until his retirement in 1919, he served as Gentleman Usher to King Edward VII and then King George V.

== Family and issue ==
In 1861, at the Royal Chapel Windsor, Erskine married Horatia Elizabeth Seymour, daughter of Maj.-Gen. Francis Seymour and his wife, Lady Emily Seymour. In 1870, her father succeeded as the 5th Marquess of Hertford and his wife was then styled as Lady Horatia Erskine. They had six sons and one daughter.

- Brig.-Gen. James Francis Erskine (4 June 1862 – 26 June 1936), married Margaret Beatrix Lambton and had issue
- Adm. Seymour Elphinstone Erskine CB (23 June 1863 – 23 February 1945), married Florence Laetitia Baker, daughter of Rev. Sir Talbot Baker, 3rd Baronet
- Walter Hugh Erskine CBE (27 April 1870 – 15 February 1948), married Violet Emily Gregory
- Alan David Erskine OBE (26 August 1872 – 26 October 1947), married Enid Rate
- Rachel Augusta Erskine (30 December 1875 – 30 November 1953), married Allen Cyprian Bourne Webb, son of Bishop Allen Becher Webb
- Ronald Keith Erskine CIE (24 January 1879 – 27 March 1934), married Mabel Seabrook Dyson
- Colonel Sir Arthur Edward Erskine GCVO DSO (1 September 1881 – 24 July 1963), married Rosemary Freda Baird, daughter of Brig.-Gen. Ned Baird

He died in 1921 at 26 Barton Street, Chelsea, London.

Government offices
Preceded by Sir Ralph Gosset	Serjeant-at-Arms of the House of Commons; 1885–1915	Succeeded by Sir Colin Keppel
