= The Terrace, 1909 =

1909 painting by Milly Childers

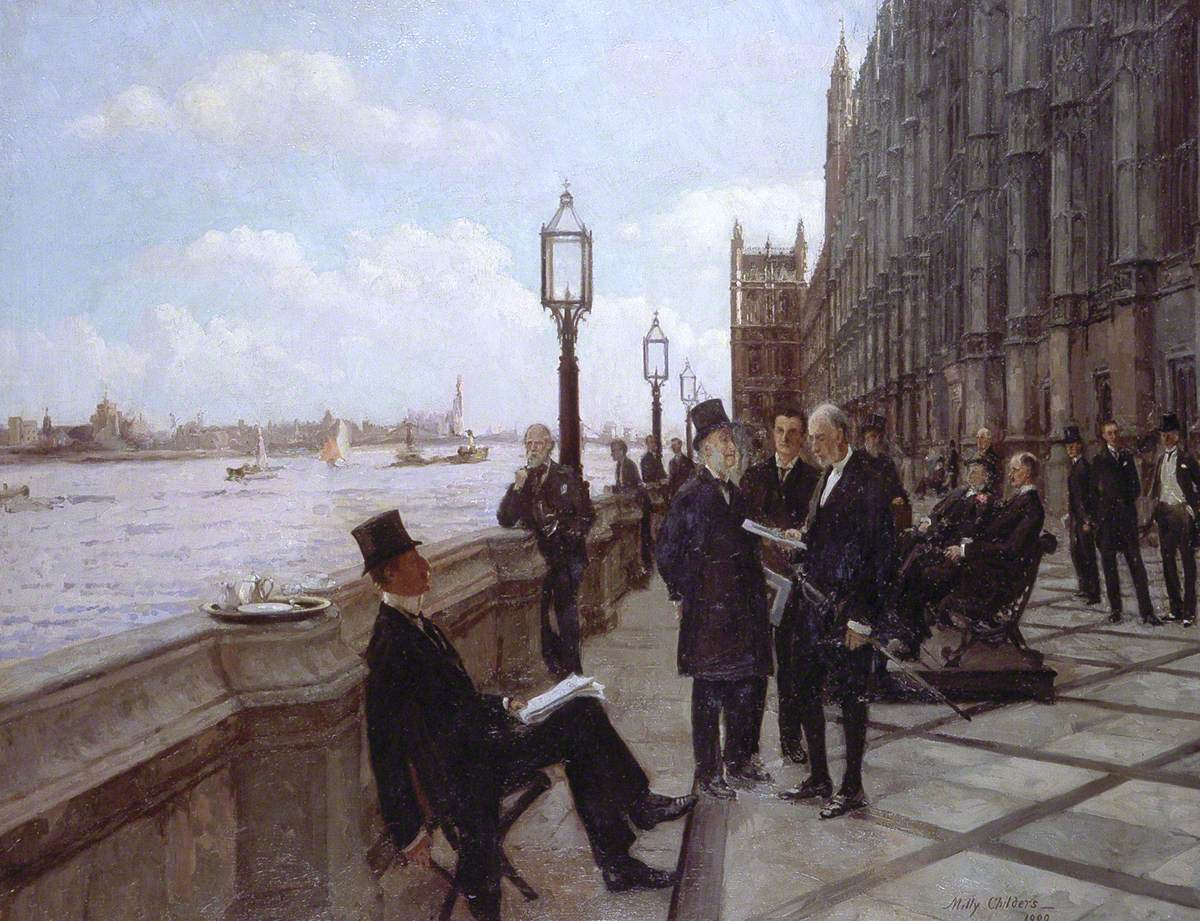
- Artist: Milly Childers
- Year: 1909
- Medium: oil paint, canvas
- Dimensions: 102 cm (40 in) × 127 cm (50 in)
- Location: Parliamentary Art Collection
- Accession: WOA 3439

The Terrace, 1909 is a landscape painting by Milly Childers showing the members' terrace of the Palace of Westminster with its view of the River Thames looking towards Lambeth Bridge. It is held by the Parliamentary Art Collection.

Painted before women could be elected to the British House of Commons, or sit in the House of Lords, the people on the terrace are all men. Childers' father Hugh Culling Eardley Childers served as Chancellor of the Exchequer and Home Secretary, which may have assisted to secure her the commission for the painting.

The bearded man with top hat in the central group is Sir John Benjamin Stone, who later took a photograph of Childers with her painting. He appears to be giving a photograph to Sir David Erskine, the Serjeant at Arms who had been responsible for removing the suffragettes Helen Fox and Muriel Matters who had chained themselves to the grilles of the ladies gallery of the House of Commons on 28 October 1908.

The man leaning against the balustrade and looking at the painter was the Labour Party leader Keir Hardie, a friend of the suffragette Emmeline Pankhurst. The man second from right is Norman Lamont.

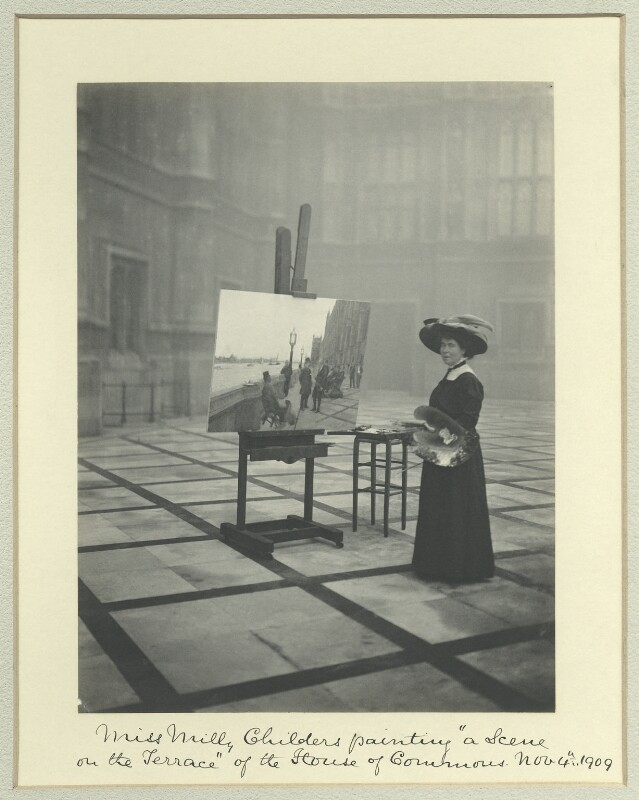
Photo of Childers by Stone on location

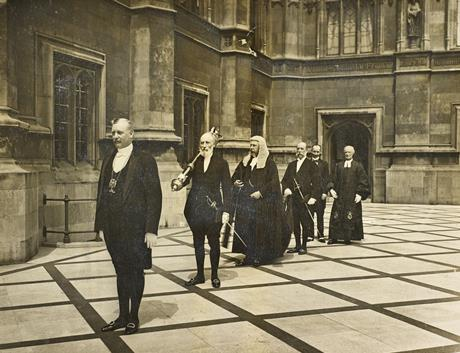
Speaker's procession of 1906 with Sir David Erskine carrying the mace.
