= Standing Figure: Knife Edge =

Sculpture series by Henry Moore

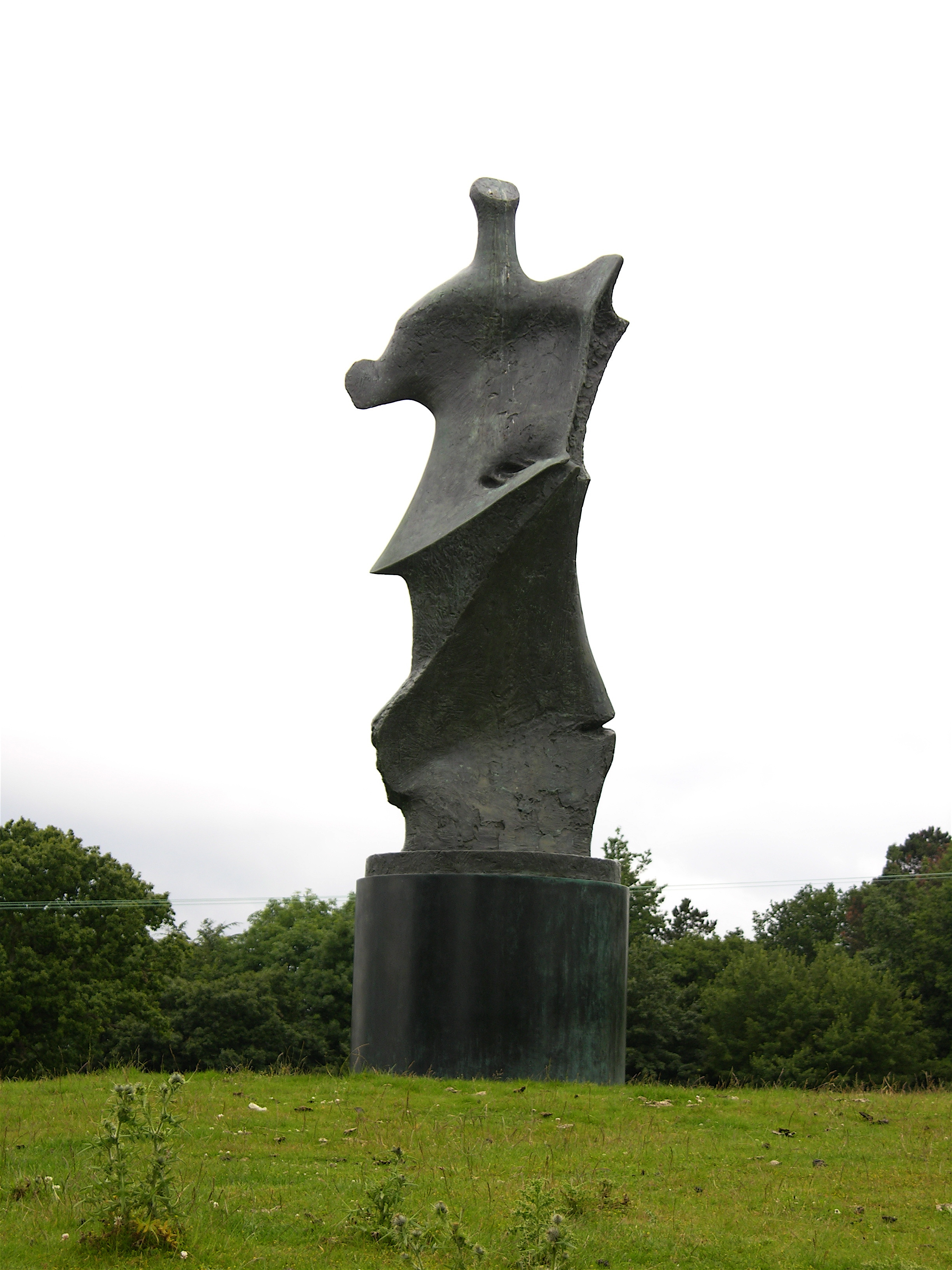
- At the Yorkshire Sculpture Park in 2007
- Artist: Henry Moore
- Year: 1961
- Catalogue: LH 482
- Medium: Bronze
- Dimensions: 280 cm (110 in)

Standing Figure: Knife Edge is a bronze sculpture by the English artist Henry Moore. It was cast in two full-size versions: Standing Figure: Knife Edge (LH 482) in 1961, and a larger Large Standing Figure: Knife Edge (LH 482a) in 1976. The sculpture also is sometimes known as Standing Figure (Bone) or Winged Figure.

Moore first conceived the work in 1961. It is based on a fragment of a bird's breastbone, to which a base and a head were added with plasticine. A rounded protrusion forms the head, and the figure has a diagonal line at its waist. The resulting composition resembles a human torso, similar to the Winged Victory of Samothrace. It had been described as the end point of Moore's investigation of upright figures, which started with Standing Figure (1950) (LH 290). He used a similar process, starting with bone fragments, for his 1962 work, Knife Edge Two Piece.

The sculpture was enlarged in three stages. First, Moore made a 162.5 centimetres (5 ft 4.0 in) high working model (LH 481) in 1961. The Henry Moore Foundation at Perry Green, Hertfordshire, has two versions, one in plaster and another in fibreglass, and other examples are held by the Hakone Open-Air Museum in Japan, and the Hirshhorn Museum and Sculpture Garden in Washington DC.

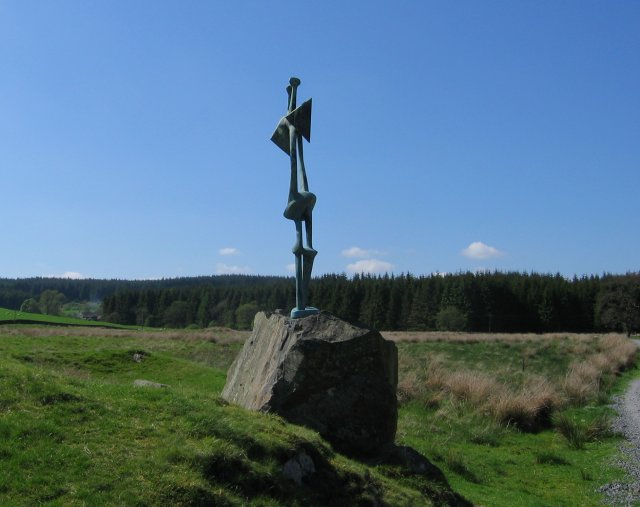
Standing Figure (1950)

Second, Moore made the 2.8 metres (9 ft 2 in) high Standing Figure: Knife Edge (LH 482), cast at the Morris Singer art foundry in 1961 in an edition of 7 (6 plus 1 artist's copy). The artist's copy, cast 0, is displayed in the W. B. Yeats Memorial Garden at St Stephen's Green in Dublin. This piece was restored in 2020. There are other examples at:

- One Maritime Plaza in San Francisco
- Norton Simon Museum in Pasadena (cast 4)
- Minneapolis Sculpture Garden
- Botanischer Garten Grugapark, Essen, Germany
- Kreeger Museum, Washington, DC

Moore enlarged the work again to create the 3.6 metres (11 ft 10 in) high Large Standing Figure: Knife Edge (LH 482a), cast in 1976 in an edition of 8 (6 plus 2 artist's copies). The two artists copies, cast 0 and cast 00, are owned by the Henry Moore Foundation, with one displayed in Greenwich Park from 1979 to 2007, and again since 2011. There are other examples at:

- Henie Onstad Kunstsenter, in Hovikodden, Norway (cast 1)
- one at the Stiftung Landis and Gyr, beside Lake Zug in Switzerland (cast 3)
- National Museum of Art, Osaka, Japan
- North Carolina Museum of Art in Raleigh, North Carolina
- Little Rock, Arkansas
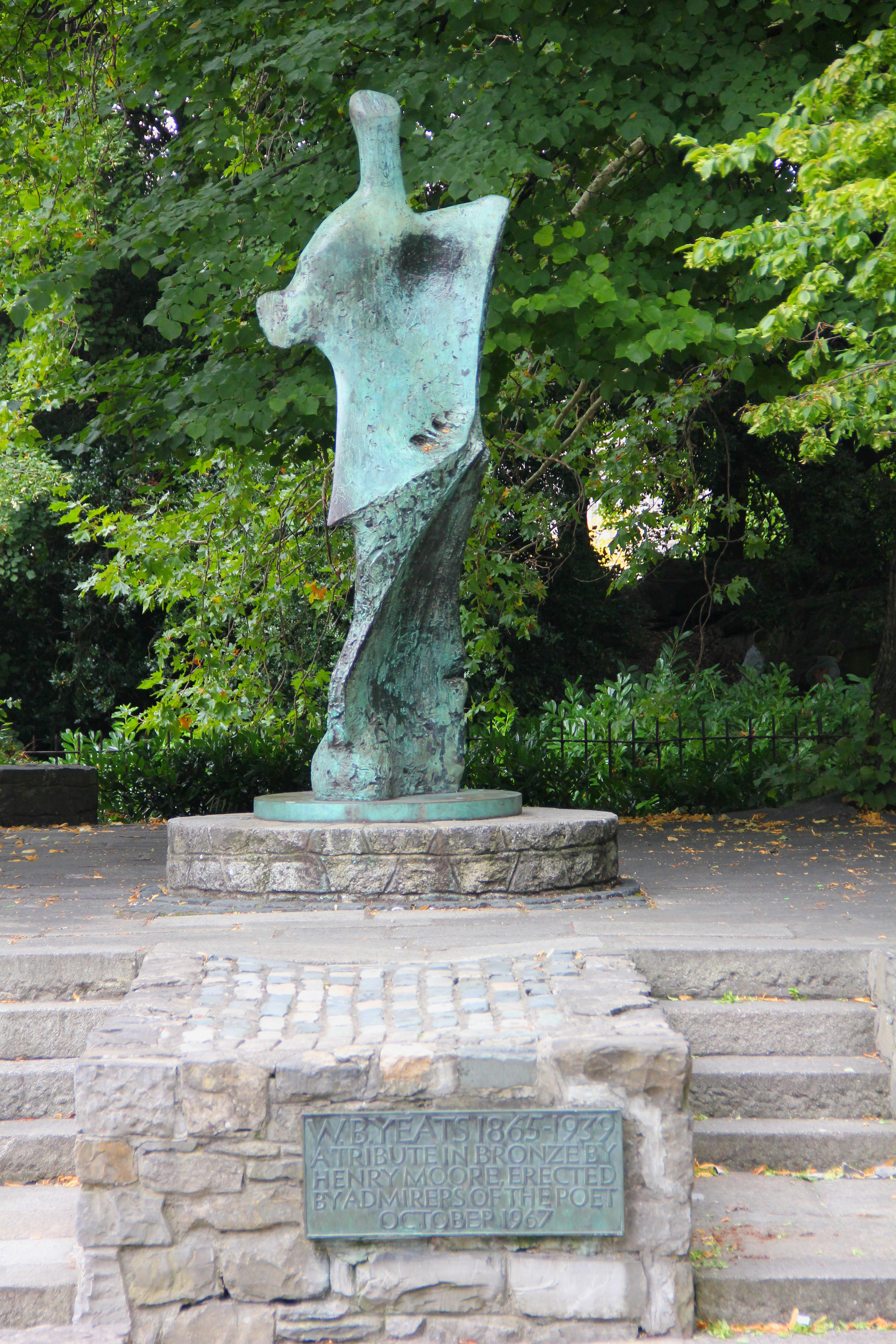
Standing Figure: Knife Edge, St Stephen's Green, Dublin

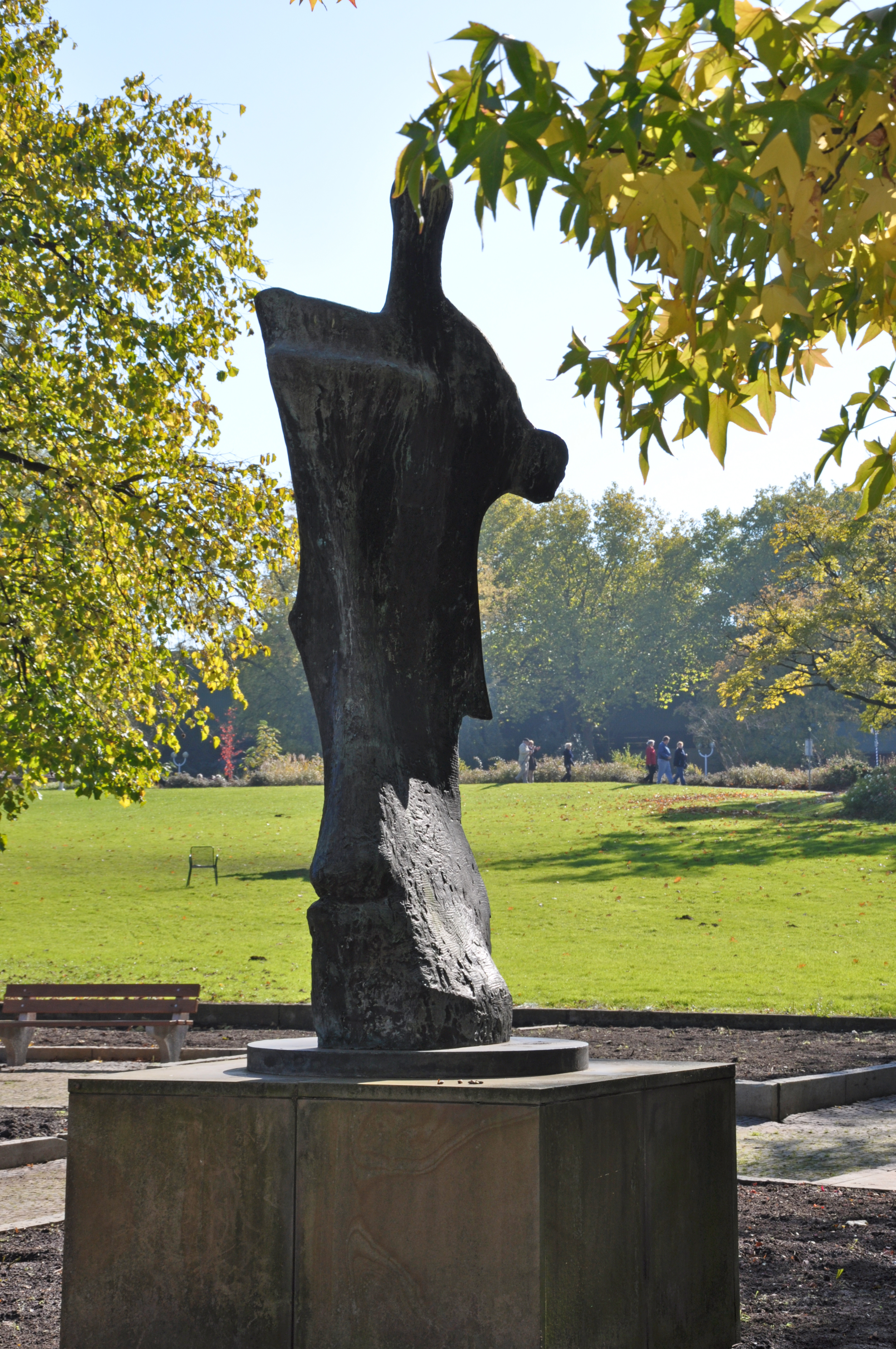
Standing Figure: Knife Edge, Essen

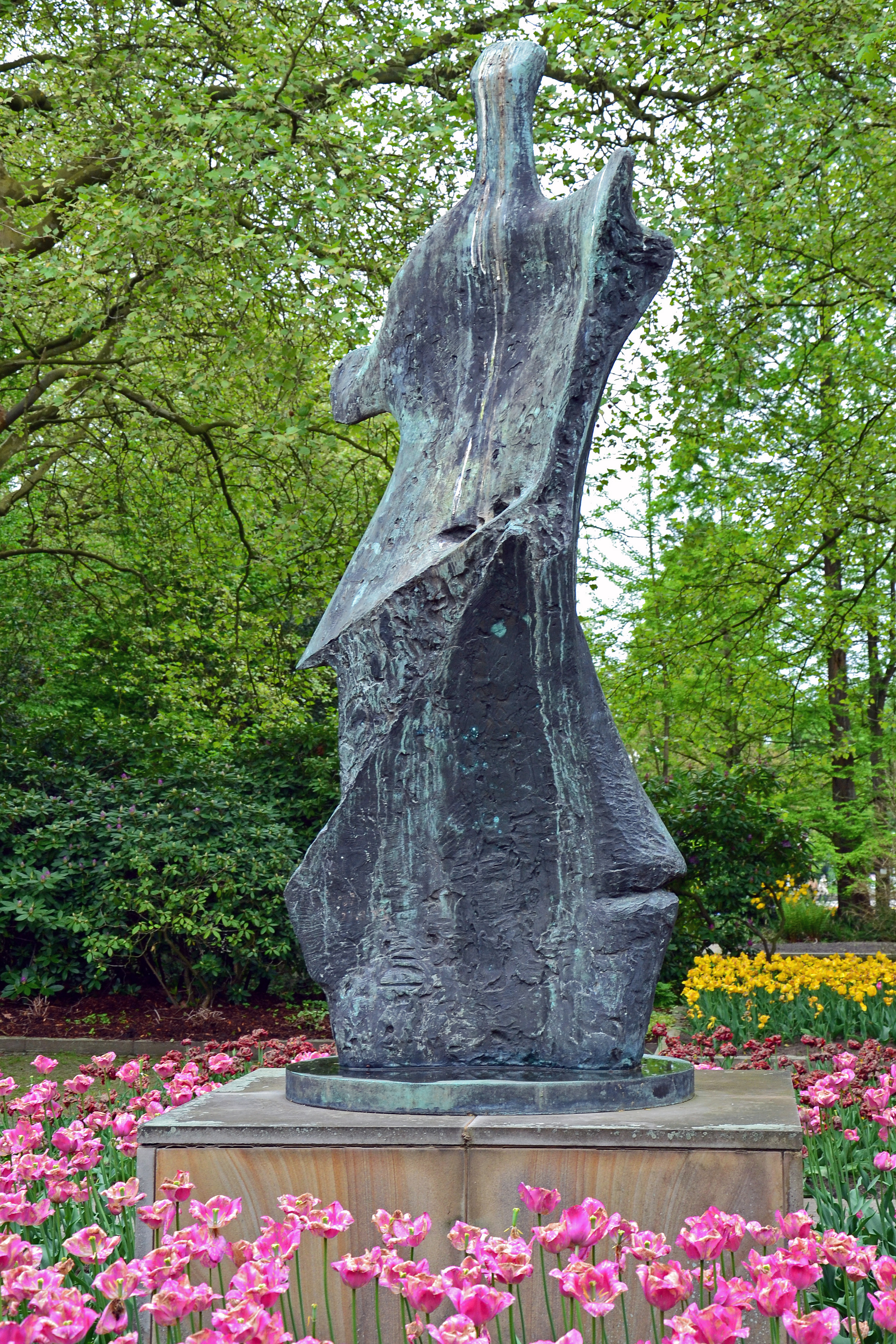
Standing Figure: Knife Edge, Essen

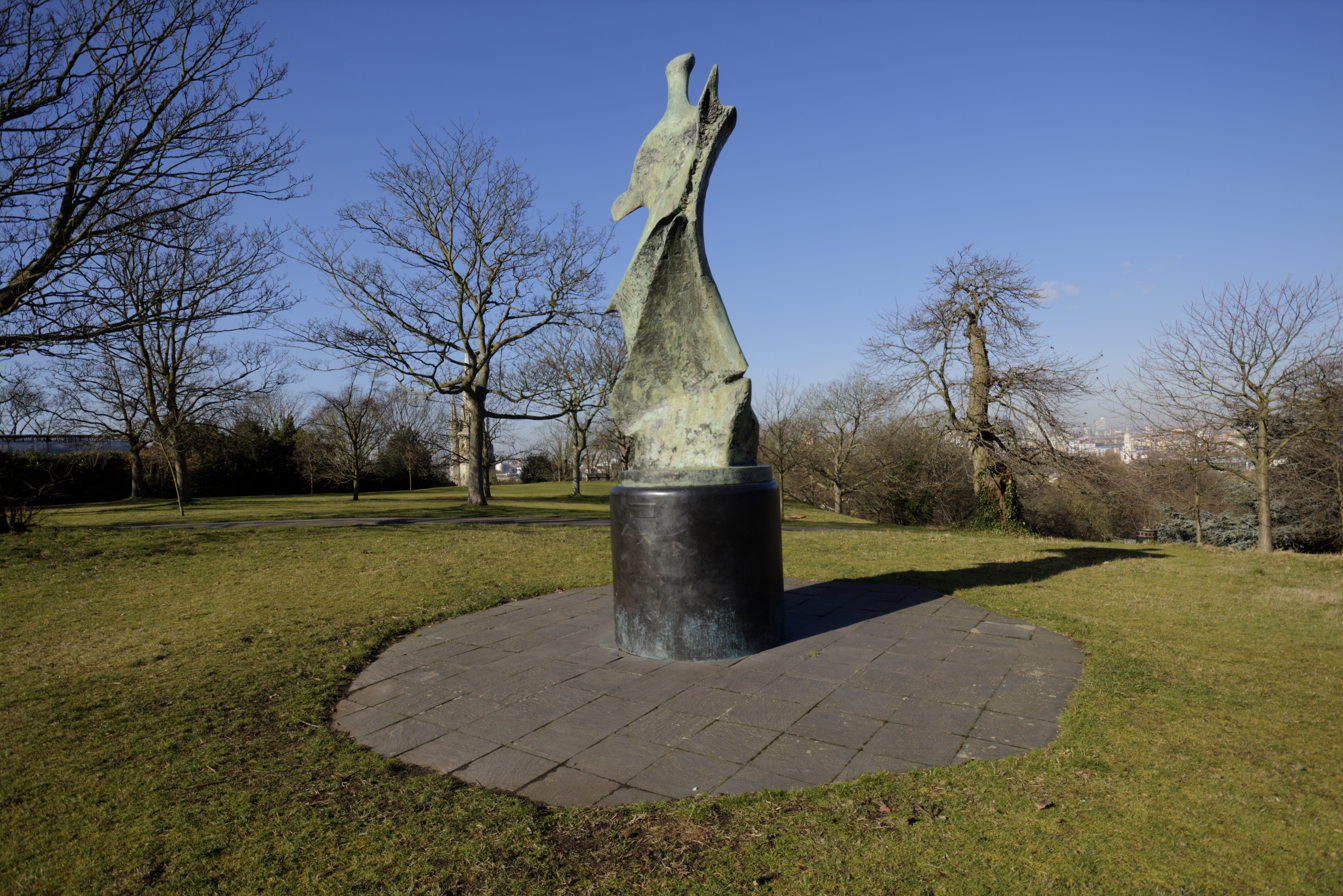
Large Standing Figure: Knife Edge, Greenwich Park

== See also ==
- List of sculptures by Henry Moore
