= College Green, London =

Public park in Westminster, London, England

College Green
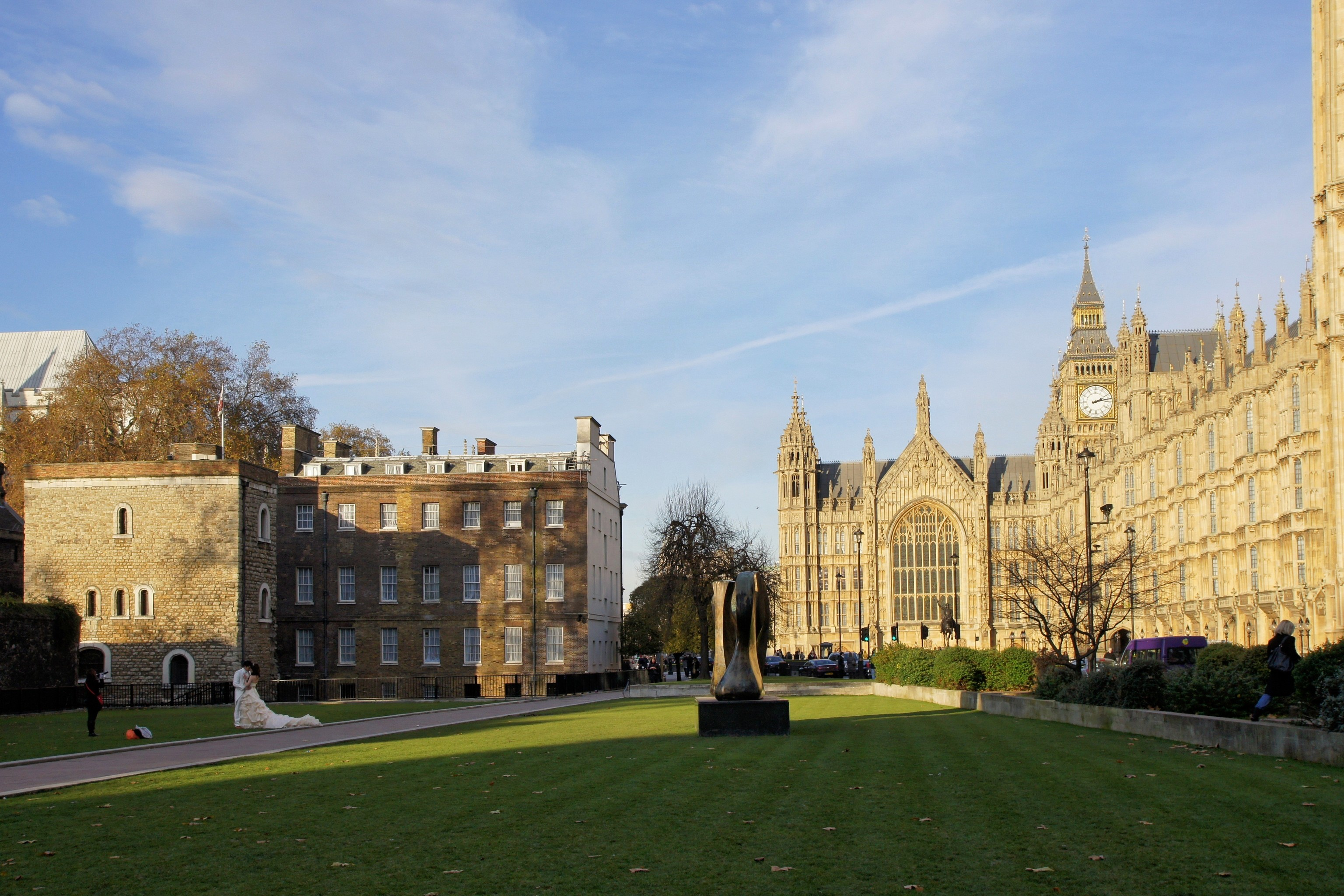
- College Green
- Interactive map of College Green
- Type: Public Park
- Location: London
- Nearest city: Westminster
- Coordinates: 51°29′52.6″N 0°7′34.2″W

College Green (aka Abingdon Green, formally known as Abingdon Street Gardens) is a public park in the City of Westminster. It is east of Westminster Abbey including Westminster Abbey Gardens and across a road from the gardens of the Houses of Parliament. The gardens are not enclosed and are accessible at all times. For many months of 2019, during the Brexit deadlock, it exclusively hosted TV broadcasts and radio and media interviews.

The park is a common place for television reporters to interview Members of Parliament. Henry Moore's bronze sculpture Knife Edge Two Piece 1962–65 is in the gardens.

The gardens are a roof to a two-storey underground car park constructed from 1963 to 1964. The site was originally a tidally flooded bank of the River Thames separated from the College Garden of Westminster Abbey by a medieval wall with a watergate. Its name refers to the collegiate church of Westminster Abbey, which includes Westminster School.
