= Knife Edge Two Piece 1962–65 =

Bronze sculpture by Henry Moore

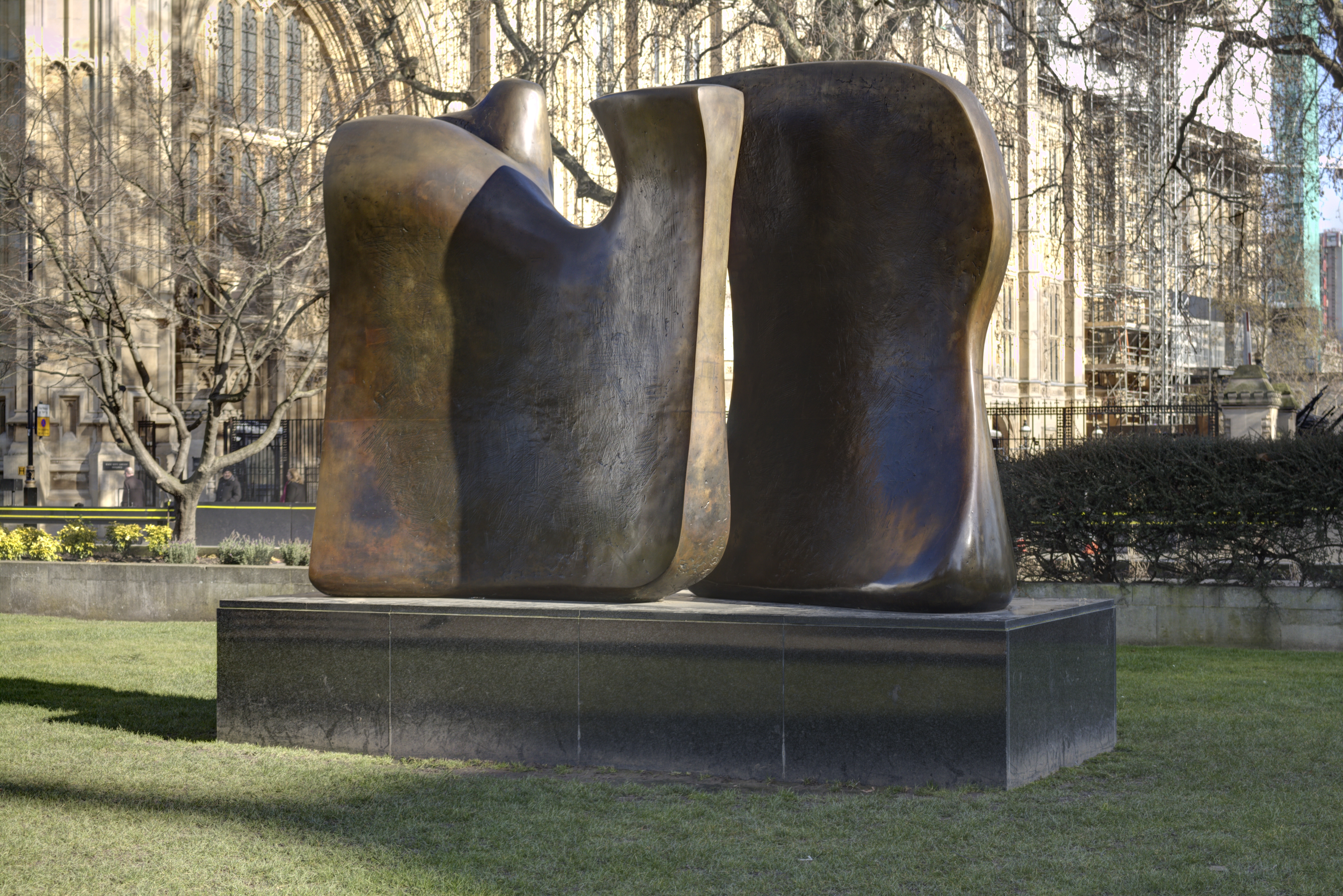
- The cast in Westminster, London, in 2015
- Artist: Henry Moore
- Year: 1962–1965
- Type: Bronze
- Dimensions: 366 cm (144 in)
- Location: 51°29′52.64″N 0°7′33.75″W (London cast) 49°14′29.37″N 123°6′49.13″W (Vancouver cast) 41°5′24.85″N 73°50′37.87″W (Kykuit cast) 51°50′10.16″N 0°5′7.24″E (Perry Green cast)

Knife Edge Two Piece 1962–65 is an abstract bronze sculpture by Henry Moore. It is one of Moore's earliest sculptures in two pieces, a mode that he started to adopt in 1959. Its form was inspired by the shape of a bone fragment. Moore created the sculpture from an edition of 10 working models in 1962; these working models are now in public collections. Moore created four full-size casts between 1962 and 1965, with one retained by him. The three casts are on public display on College Green in Westminster, London; Queen Elizabeth Park in Vancouver; and the garden at Kykuit, the house of the Rockefeller family in Tarrytown, New York. Moore's own cast is on display at his former studio and estate, 'Hoglands' in Perry Green, Hertfordshire in southern England. A similar work, Mirror Knife Edge 1977 (or Knife Edge Mirror Two Piece), is displayed at the entrance to I. M. Pei's east wing of the National Gallery of Art in Washington, D.C. The Westminster cast was donated by Moore through the Contemporary Art Society to what he believed was the City of London, but its actual ownership was undetermined for many years. The Westminster cast subsequently fell into disrepair, and was restored in 2013 after it became part of the British Parliamentary Art Collection; it was granted a Grade II* listing in January 2016.

== Background ==
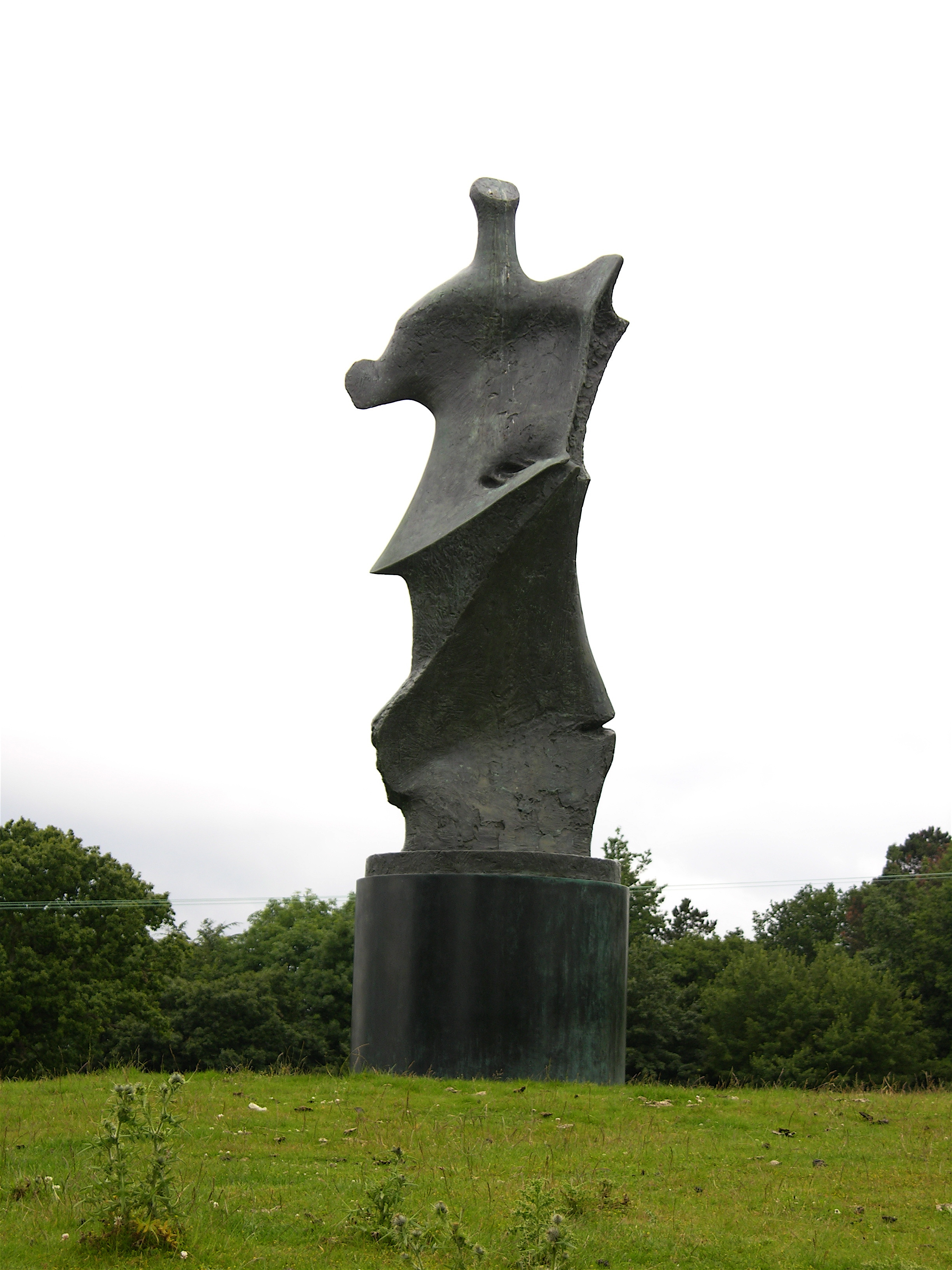
Standing Figure (Knife Edge), 1961

By 1960 Moore was moving on from his earlier works, directly inspired by the human form and with textured surfaces, such as Draped Seated Woman 1957–58, to more rounded abstract shapes, inspired by the shapes of stones or bones. Moore made a connected work in 1961, also inspired by bone, Standing Figure (Knife Edge) (LH 482).

== Working model ==
In 1962 Moore created an edition of 10 working models (LH 504) for a new two-piece sculpture. The Tate Gallery in London acquired a small working model in 1963. Other working models are in the collections of the Kunstmuseum in The Hague, the Didrichsen Art Museum in Helsinki, the Memorial Art Gallery of the University of Rochester in Rochester, New York, and the Kunsthaus in Zurich. Moore planned the full-size sculpture to be over 10 feet high, large enough for a person to walk between the two elements.

== Sculpture ==
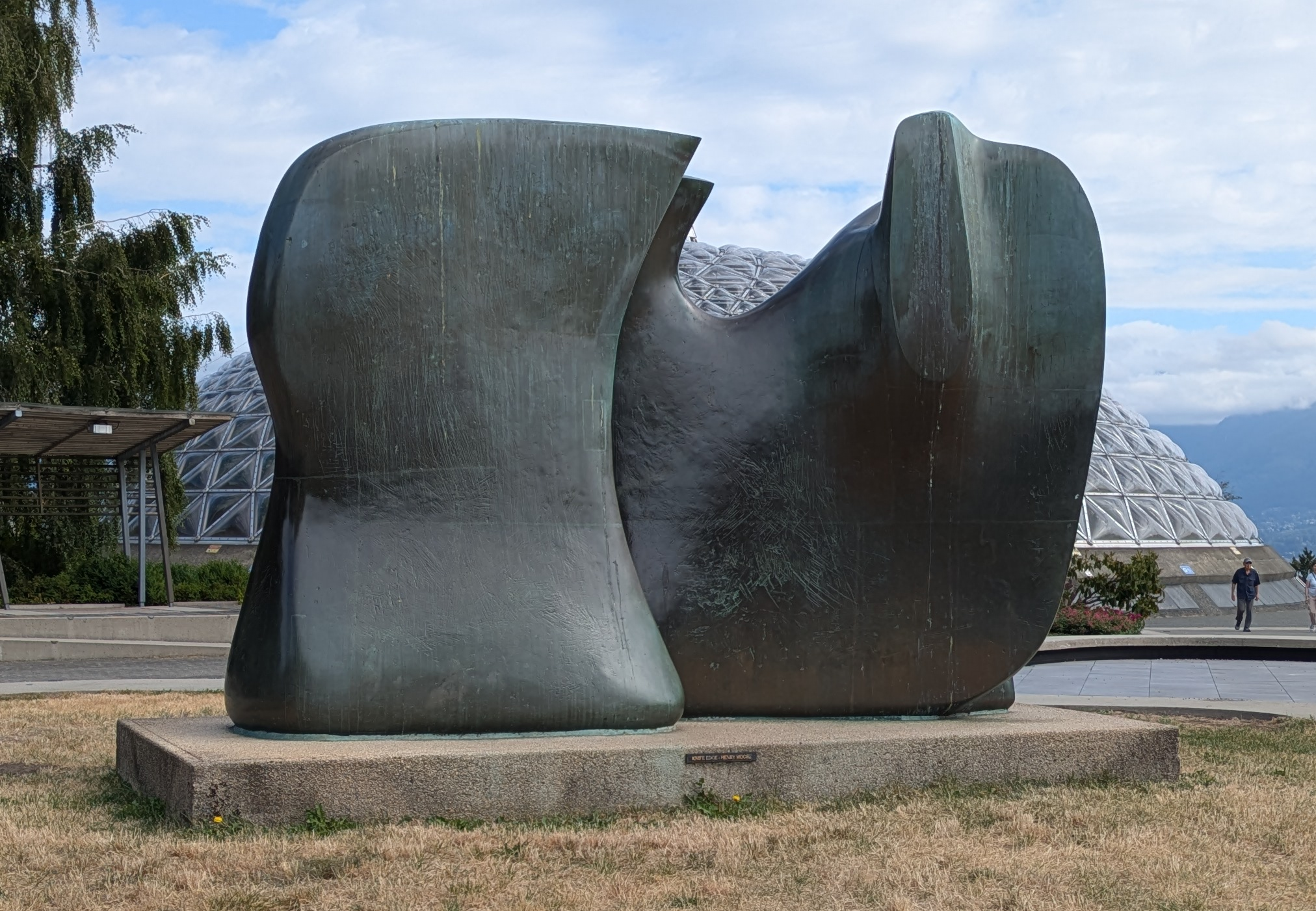
Vancouver cast

The full-size sculpture, catalogued as "LH 516", was cast in an edition of four (or "3+1"; one being retained by the artist). Moore was inspired by the "lightness and strength of bone fragment" in creating the piece. The full-size sculptures, 366 centimetres (144 in) long and weighing about 3 tonnes (3.3 tons), were cast by Hermann Noack in Berlin.

The second cast of the work is located in Abingdon Street Gardens (better known as College Green) in the City of Westminster. The other full-size casts are located near the fountains next to Bloedel Floral Conservatory in Queen Elizabeth Park in Vancouver, BC, Canada, donated by Prentice Bloedel; near the Rose Garden of the Rockefeller family house at Kykuit at Tarrytown, New York. Moore donated his artist's copy (0/3) to the Henry Moore Foundation in 1977, and it is displayed at Perry Green, Hertfordshire.

Moore made a larger and reversed version of the sculpture, Mirror Knife Edge 1977 or Knife Edge Mirror Two Piece (LH 714) – which is 5.34x7.21x3.63m or about 17.5x23.7x11.9 feet and weighs about 15 short tons (14 t) – which was commissioned for the entrance to I. M. Pei's east wing of the National Gallery of Art in Washington, D.C. The work is carefully cleaned and conserved each year to maintain the distinction between its shiny and patinated surfaces, as the artist intended.

== Westminster cast ==
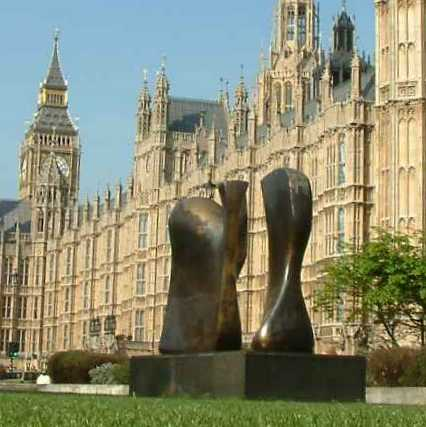
The second cast of Knife Edge Two Piece in 2004, with the Palace of Westminster in the background.

The second cast of Knife Edge Two Piece is located in Abingdon Street Gardens, also known as College Green, opposite the Palace of Westminster in London. In 1965 Whitney Straight, the chairman of the Contemporary Art Society, wrote to Charles Pannell MP, the Minister of State for Public Buildings and Works to tell him that the society was "considering the possibility of ‘making a gift of a substantial work of art to be erected at some suitable site in London". The Contemporary Art Society met with Henry Moore to discuss their proposal and Moore subsequently chose the site at Abingdon Street Gardens for the sculpture. Moore waived his usual fee, and the Contemporary Art Society paid for the cost of the casting. The sculpture was unveiled by Robert Mellish, the Minister of Public Building and Works, on 1 September 1967.

Moore liked the site so much that he did not even visit an alternative site in Hyde Park; he felt that the sculpture might have been lost in such a big park, recalling an experience he had trying to find the sculpture Riva by Jacob Epstein in the park. He welcomed the fact that the sculpture would be next to a public path and would have seating nearby to allow contemplation, and compared the gardens favourably with the setting for Hubert Le Sueur’s equestrian statue of Charles I at Charing Cross, "which, in order to look at closely and appreciate in detail, you have to risk your life in crossing a maze of traffic". The siting of the sculpture was disliked by some, with Neil Marten MP asking Parliament why "this lovely part of Westminster should be littered with something that looks like a crashed unidentified flying object."

Moore believed he had donated the work to the City of London, but the Henry Moore Foundation believed it was owned by the City of Westminster, and its delivery was accepted by the Ministry of Public Building and Works. The land where it is situated was a bombsite in the Second World War, and is owned by the Parliamentary Estate; Westminster City Council operates a car park underneath. The sculpture was moved and placed on a plinth in 1969. No formal arrangements were ever made for the ownership and care of Knife Edge Two Piece, and it fell into a state of disrepair. Though it is worth an estimated £5m, no conservation work ever took place on the sculpture, and its ownership was unresolved until the House of Commons agreed to take responsibility for it. Knife Edge Two Piece entered the Parliamentary Art Collection in 2011. It was granted a Grade II* listing in January 2016.

=== Restoration ===
16 minute documentary video from UK Parliament about the House of Commons project to conserve the sculpture.

The Chair of the House of Commons Works of Art Committee, Frank Doran MP, had been concerned by the appearance of the sculpture and enquired of the Minister for Culture, Communications and Creative Industries, Ed Vaizey MP, what plans there were for its care and maintenance. Vaizey replied that the House of Commons should take ownership of the statue and responsibility for its care. Vaizey subsequently described Knife Edge Two Piece as "one of the most televised works of art in London". Restoration work was originally planned to be completed in time for the 2012 Summer Olympics in London, but was not begun until February 2013.

Due to a lack of maintenance, the protective lacquer covering Knife Edge Two Piece degraded and exposed the surface of the sculpture to the elements. This resulted in oxidation of the bronze metal. Subsequent deterioration of the patination and years of graffiti scratched into the surface resulted in further corrosion. The conservation aimed to remove the remaining protective lacquer and surface dirt, and to remove the result of corrosion and oxidation from the sculpture, and take the surface back to the bare metal. Following the removal of graffiti the sculpture was repatinated to return it to its original colour. It was finally waxed with a weatherproof surface to protect it from future damage. The conservation work was undertaken by Rupert Harris Conservation, working in consultation with the Henry Moore Foundation. The cost of the conservation was £16,190, with £11,000 contributed by the Henry Moore Foundation.

== See also ==
- List of sculptures by Henry Moore
- List of public art in Washington, D.C., Ward 2
