= Milly Childers =

English painter (1866-1922)

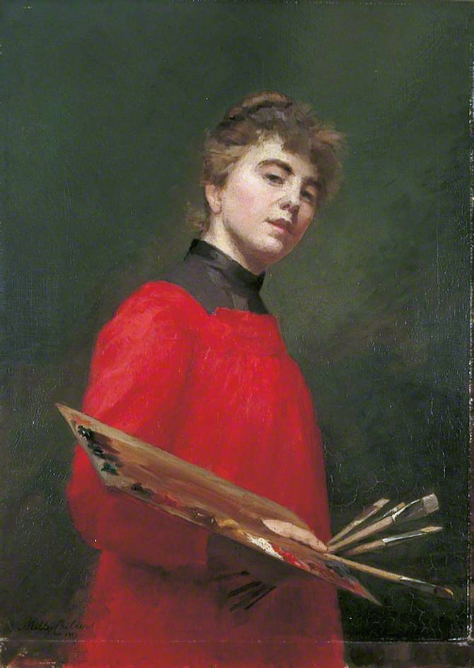
- Self portrait (1889)
- Born: Emily Maria Eardley Childers; 26 February 1866; Kensington, London
- Died: 8 February 1922 (aged 55); Hampstead, London, England
- Known for: Painting
- Notable work: The Terrace, 1909
- Father: Hugh Childers

Emily "Milly" Maria Eardley Childers (26 February 1866 – 8 February 1922) was an English painter of the later Victorian era and the early 20th century. She is best known for her portrait The Terrace, 1909 at the Palace of Westminster.

== Early life and family ==
Childers was born in 1866 at 17, Princes Garden, Kensington, into a prominent political family. She was the youngest of eight children of Hugh Childers and his wife, Emily Walker. Her father was a Member of Parliament and Cabinet minister. In 1868, her father was appointed First Lord of the Admiralty under Gladstone.

Childers' mother died in 1875, when Milly was 9 years old. Four years later, her father remarried, to Katherine Anne Elliot (née Gilbert) in Paris. She was the daughter of Ashurst Gilbert, Bishop of Chichester and the widow of Hon. Gilbert Elliot, son of the 2nd Earl Minto.

== Career ==
Childers began exhibiting her art around 1890. After her father's 1892 retirement from public service, father and daughter travelled together through England and France; Milly Childers painted landscapes, and church interiors. Her father's social and political connections brought his daughter some commissioned work, including as a restorer and copyist for Lord Halifax at Temple Newsam. Childers exhibited her work at the Palace of Fine Arts at the 1893 World's Columbian Exposition in Chicago, Illinois.

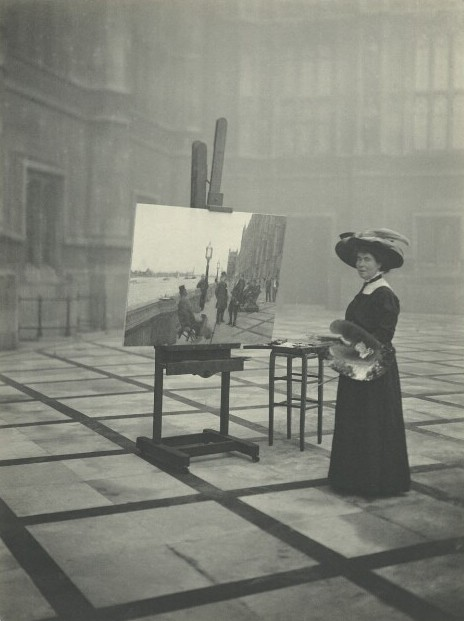
Photograph of Milly Childers painting The Terrace, 1909 by Sir John Benjamin Stone

Her landscape The Terrace, 1909 depicts the Members' Terrace outside the Palace of Westminster overlooking the River Thames. Featuring all men in Edwardian dress, it captures a time when women were barred from holding office or voting. It is now in the Parliamentary Art Collection. Other prominent paintings are the portrait of her father and a self-portrait from 1889. Others of her better-known works are Children Playing Hoops in the Street, Arromanches and The Pannier market, Barnstaple. Her style shows influences from the Impressionists.

Childers was the last artist to paint the interior of the original Reims Cathedral, which was destroyed in 1914 during the First World War.

She died in 1922, aged 55, at Hampstead General Hospital in London. She was eulogised in The Times as "an artist of rare ability, and of a charming personality."

== Gallery ==
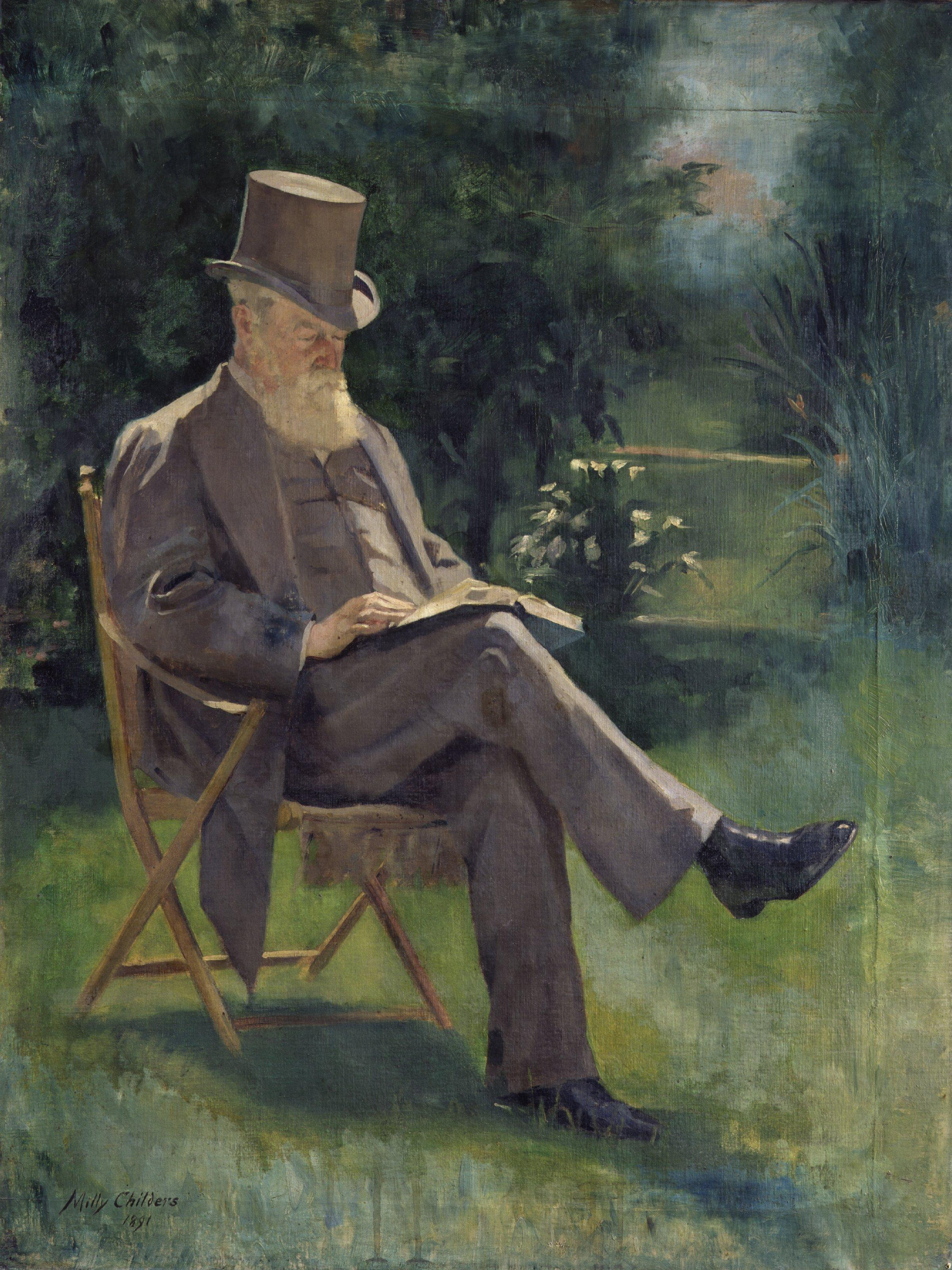
Portrait of Hugh Childers (1891)

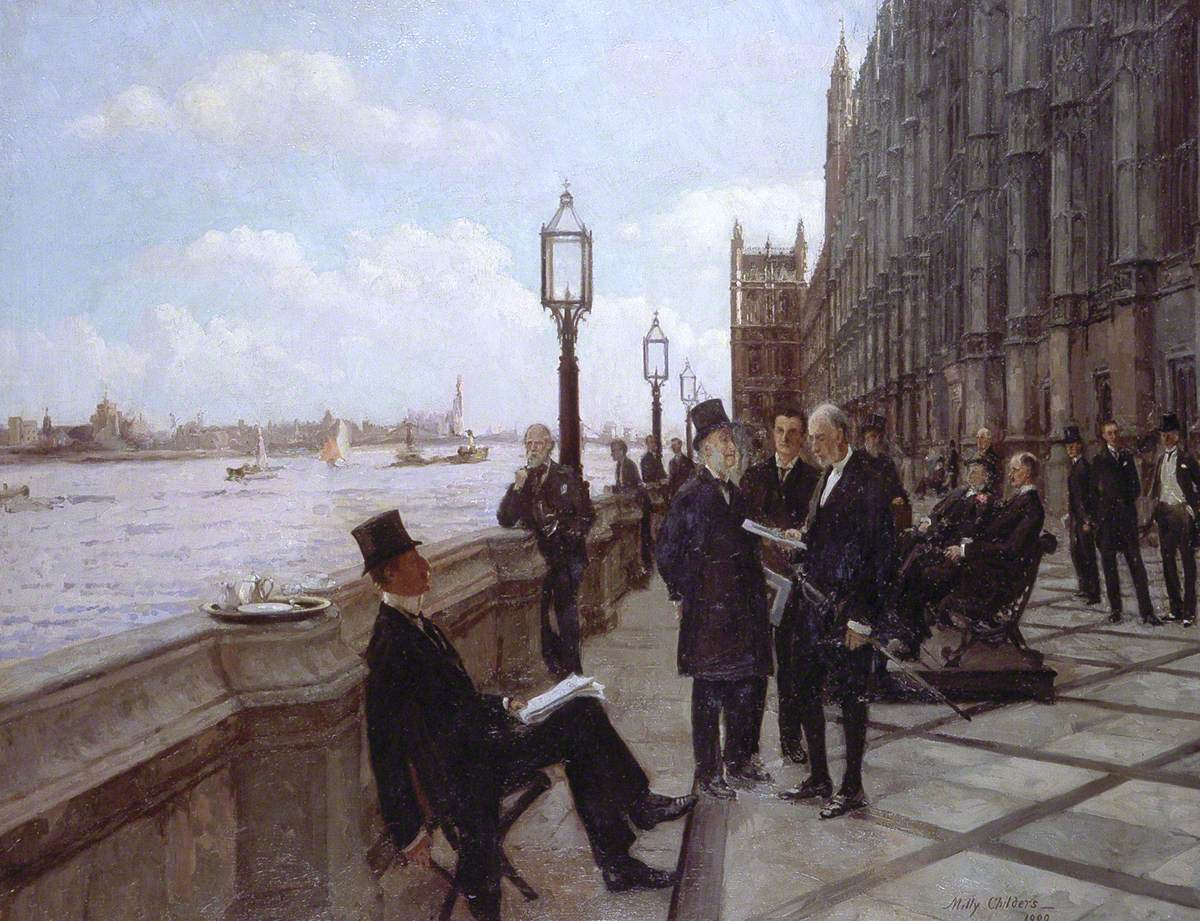
The Terrace, 1909

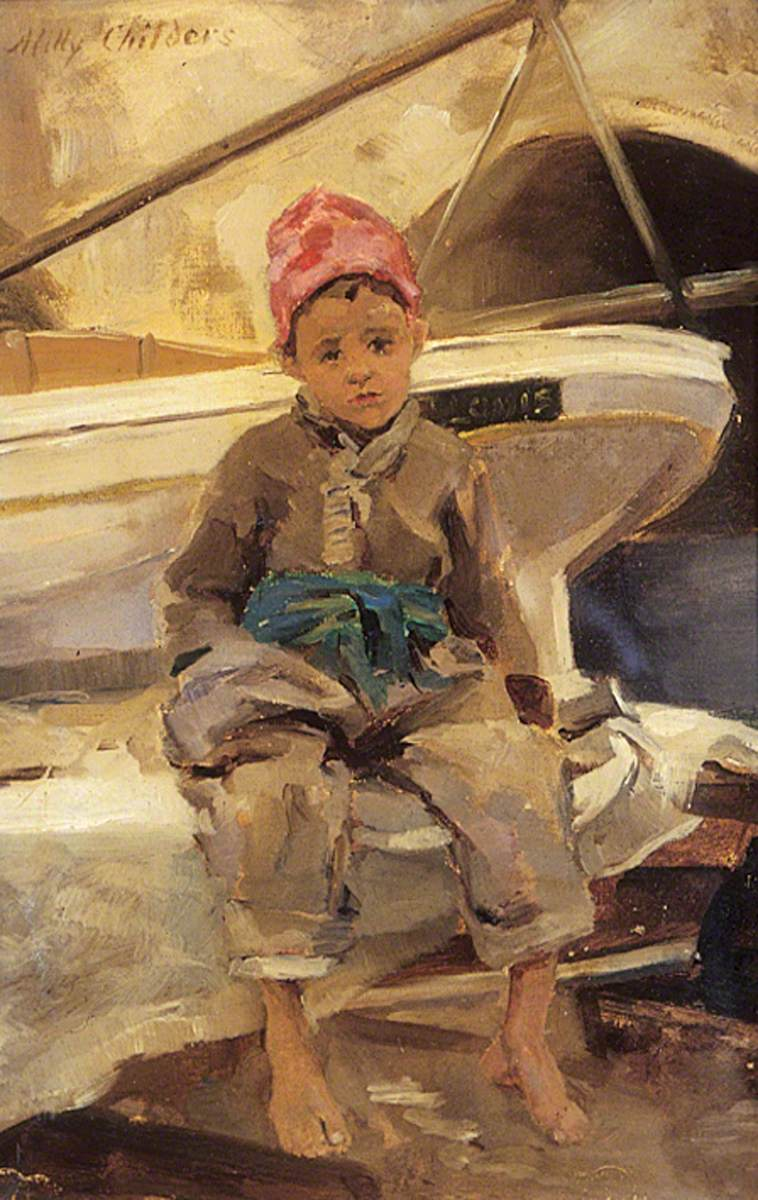
Little Fisher Boy, Jules Ferry

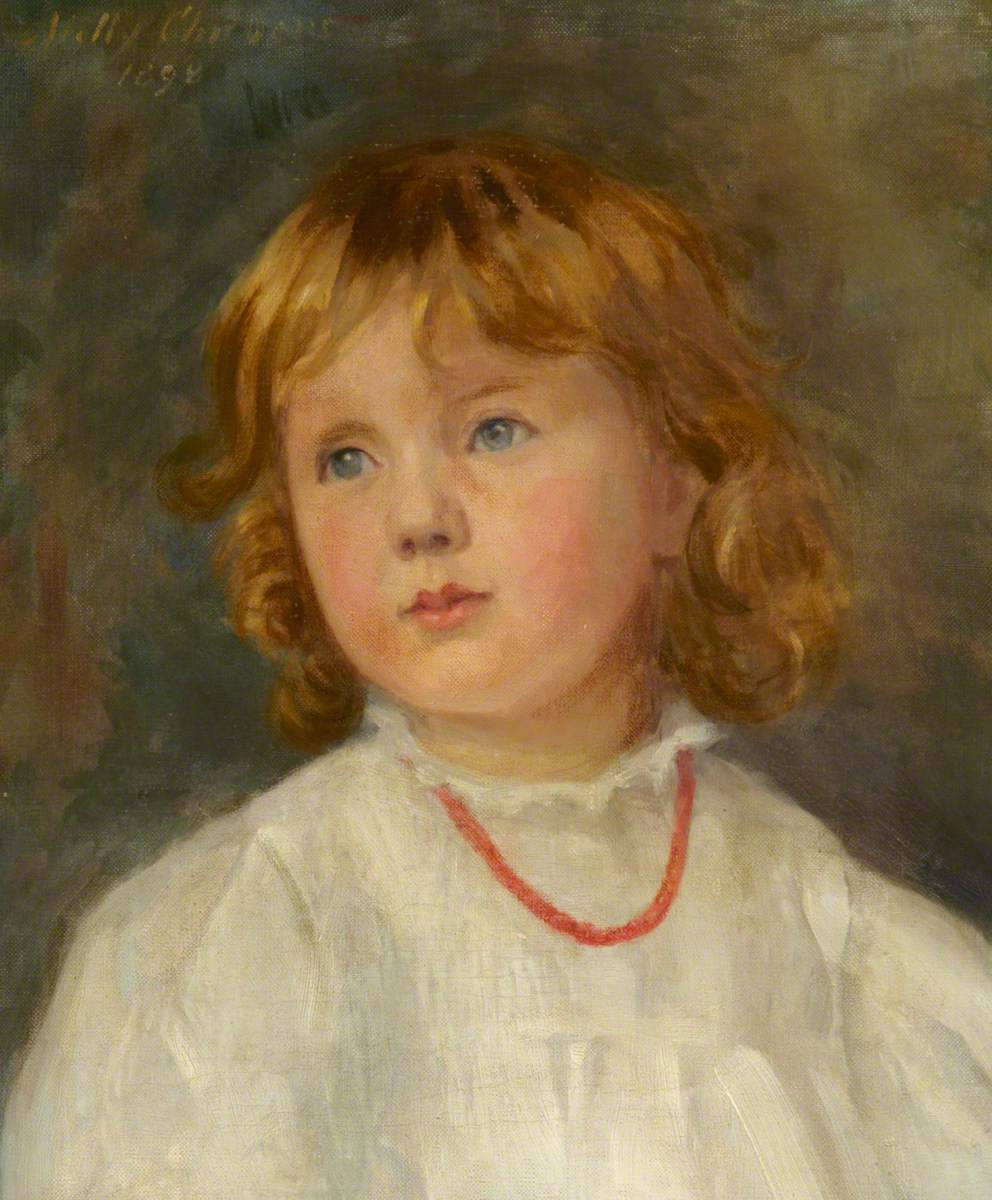
Portrait of a Sister of Ralph Stawel Dutton, as a Child

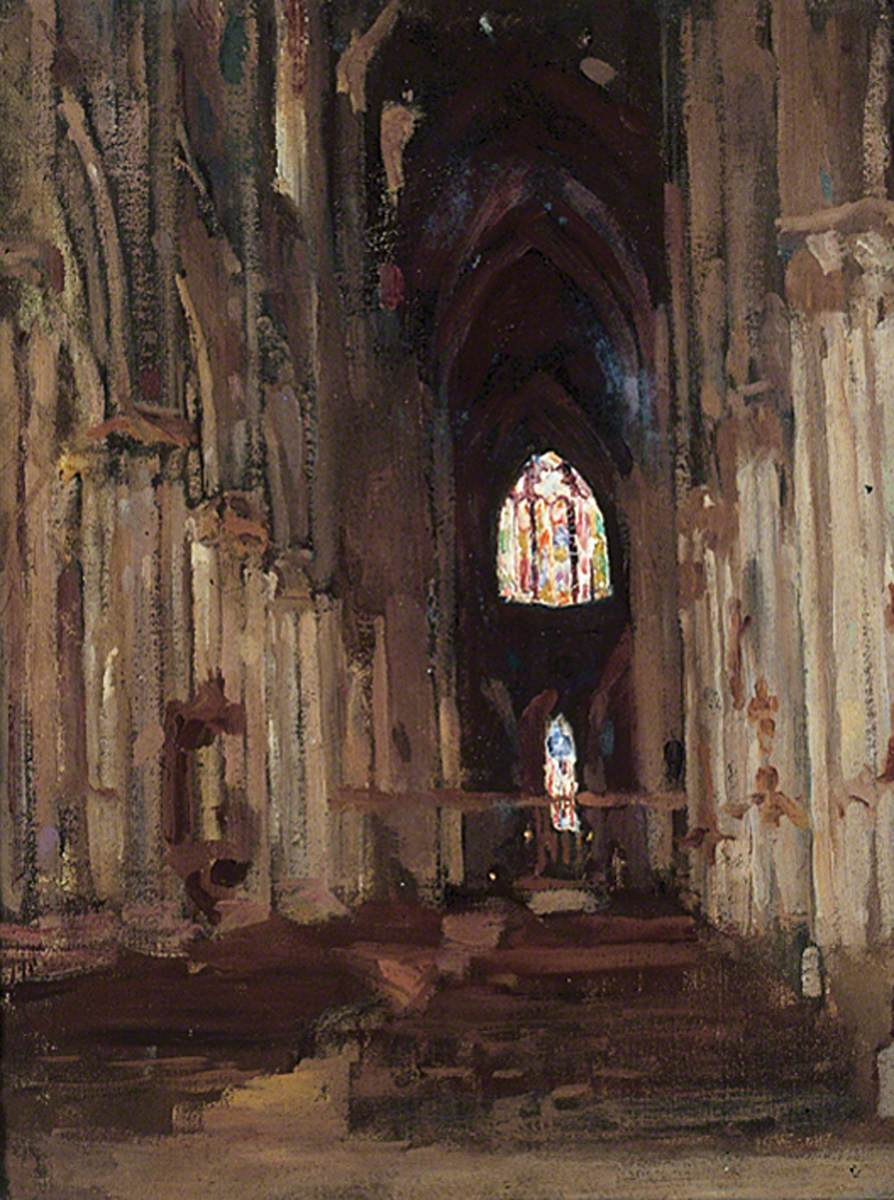
Interior of Reims Cathedral in 1914, shortly before its destruction in the war

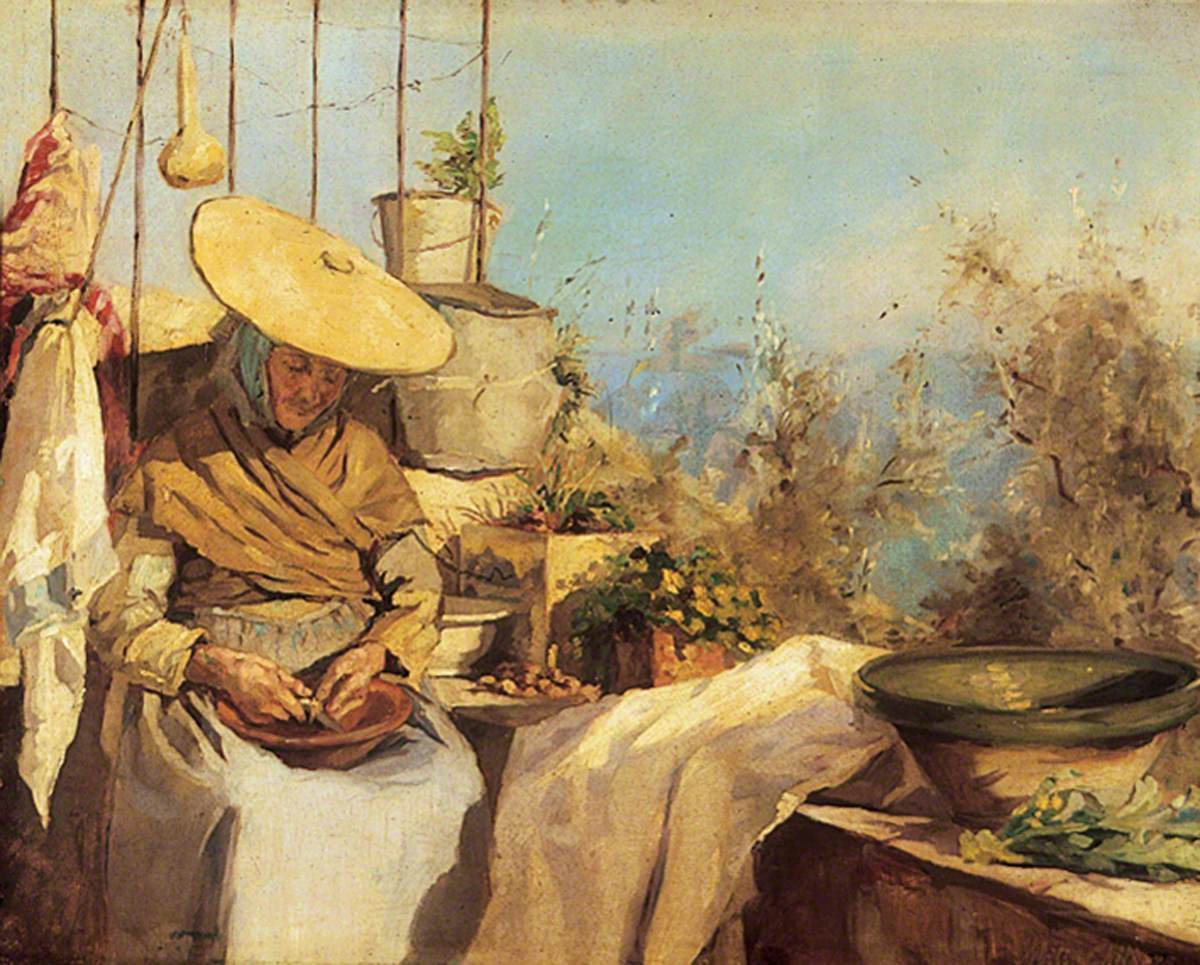
Marietta
