= Michael Hue-Williams =

British art dealer and gallery director (born 1965)

Michael Hue-Williams (born 26 July 1965) is a British art dealer and gallery director. He currently lives and works in London, and owns Albion Barn gallery in Oxfordshire.

== Early life and career ==
Hue-Williams was born in Oxford on 26 July 1965 to Giles Peter and Margaret Hue-Williams. He graduated with a master's degree in History of Art at Trinity College, Cambridge in 1986. In 1988, he opened his first gallery in partnership with Claus Runkel with an exhibition of works by Max Ernst. The gallery was designed by John Pawson and Claudio Silvestrin, with Pawson later designing two more of Hue-Williams' exhibition spaces.)

== Albion Gallery ==
In 2004, Hue-Williams opened Albion Gallery in London, serving as its owner and CEO. Albion was designed by Foster + Partners, with interiors by India Mahdavi. The gallery occupied a large commercial exhibition space on the southern bank of the River Thames. The gallery interior was designed by India Mahdavi (nominated in France as Designer of the Year in 2003). Situated on the southern bank of the River Thames, Albion featured three exhibition spaces representing artists such as David Adjaye, Campana Brothers, Xu Bing, Cai Guo-Qiang, Zhan Wang, Shilpa Gupta, Jitish Kallat, Mariko Mori, Jaume Plensa, Mark di Suvero, Vito Acconci, Andy Goldsworthy, Ilya Kabakov, James Turrell, Hiroshi Sugimoto, Kader Attia and Ai Weiwei, to whom he gave a first UK exhibition.

== External Projects ==
Outside of his projects with Albion, Hue-Williams has produced numerous large-scale projects including: Stephen Cox in the Jamali Kamali Gardens, New Delhi, India, 1996; Cai Guo-Qiang’s ‘Man, Eye, Eagle in the Sky’, 2004 and Ilya and Emilia Kabakov’s project ‘The Ship of Tolerance’, 2005, both produced in Siwa, Egypt; and 'The Snow Show' (supporting Lance Fung), which was first shown in Lapland, Finland, 2004 and then for the Turin Winter Olympics, 2006, showing collaborative work by architects and artists including Yoko Ono, Anish Kapoor and Jaume Plensa.

Hue-Williams has also helped to produce exhibitions at the Guggenheim, New York; Tate Gallery, London; Haus der Kunst, Munich; Martin Gropius Bau and MAK, Vienna; Fondation Beyeler, Basel; Serpentine, London; and Waddesdon Manor. He was a keynote speaker at the Intelligence Squared debate on morals and ethics in the art-world in 2010; Hue-Williams discussed whether "the art market is less ethical than the stock market," alongside Richard L. Feigen, Adam Lindemann, Jerry Saltz, Chuck Close and Amy Cappellazzo.

In 2012, Hue-Williams curated the outdoor sculpture exhibition House of Cards for Lord Rothschild and Christie's, including works by Richard Serra, Jeff Koons, Damien Hirst, Joana Vasconcelos, Wim Delvoye, Tony Smith, Marc Newson and Anish Kapoor, among others.

In 2013, he curated the Masterpiece Sculpture Walk, including works by Eduardo Chillida, Joana Vasconcelos, Xu Bing, and Zhan Wang.

== Albion Barn and Fields ==
Hue-Williams opened his latest exhibition space in October 2013. Albion Barn is situated in Oxfordshire and was designed by Christina Seilern, principal architect of Studio Seilern Architects, winners of the 2013 RIBA Awards. The space opened with an exhibition of James Turrell’s works including a Skyspace. Since then, Albion Barn has exhibited shows by artists such as Richard Woods (2014 and 2019), John Virtue (2015 and 2019), Henry Hudson (2015), Richard Long (2018), Joana Vasconcelos (2018), Nick Knight (2019), Constantin Brancusi and Magdalene Odundo (2020), Douglas Gordon (2021) and James Capper (2017, 2021 and 2022). In 2026, Albion Barn and Fields presented Heavy Metal, an exhibition of sculptures by Anthony Caro and James Capper, curated by Hue-Williams and his daughter Lucca Hue-Williams.

In 2021, the opening of Albion Fields saw Hue-Williams expand his Oxfordshire operation. Albion Fields is a sculpture park set within 50 acres of countryside, parts of which have been rewilded. The inaugural show included sculptures by Erwin Wurm, Ai Weiwei, Vito Acconci, Kevin Francis Gray, Richard Long, Bernar Venet, Cristina Iglesias and Alicja Kwade, among others, as well as a pavilion by David Adjaye.

== Albion Publishing ==
Hue-Williams owns his own publishing company, Albion Publishing. He has published more than 50 books including monographs on Cai Guo-Qiang, Ai Weiwei, James Turrell, Joana Vasconcelos, Xu Bing, Campana Brothers, and Andy Goldsworthy. Other publications include: John Virtue, Richard Woods, Scott Burton, Wang Qing Song and Jitish Kallatt, among others.

In 2013, he founded the Seven Sins Press, which published Envy, the first of a planned series of seven artist's books by Douglas Gordon.
