= A-N-D =

Canadian lighting company

- Type: Private
- Industry: Lighting design and manufacturing
- Founded: 2013; 13 years ago
- Founders: Lukas Peet, Caine Heintzman, Matt Davis
- Headquarters: Vancouver, British Columbia, Canada
- Products: Decorative lighting, luminaires
- Website: a-n-d.com

A-N-D is a Canadian lighting design and manufacturing studio based in Vancouver, British Columbia. The studio designs and assembles decorative luminaires in-house with distribution in North America and Europe.

== History ==
A-N-D (A New Detail) was founded by Lukas Peet, Caine Heintzman, and Matt Davis in Vancouver in 2013, originally operating as ANDLight before evolving from collaborative lighting design projects into a commercial studio.

In December 2013, Peet won the Design Exchange's Emerging Designer Competition, which led to a solo exhibition at the Design Exchange Museum in Toronto in early 2014. ANDLight's lighting collection was featured at Milan Design Week 2018 by Die Welt for combining minimalism with 1970s design elements.

During the mid-2010s, the studio began exhibiting lighting collections at international design events, including Milan Design Week, Maison et Objet Miami, and Three Days of Design in Copenhagen. By 2014, the studio reported international customers in North America, Australia, and Europe. To support international distribution, the company expanded operations with staff in the United States and a European office in Copenhagen.

A-N-D's Vale Series received the 2019 Archiproducts Design Award, and the Pipeline Chandelier 9 received the 2020 Archiproducts Design Award.

In October 2022, Heintzman was recognized by the BC Achievement Foundation as a recipient of the Judson Beaumont Emerging Artist award.

The Vale floor lamp was included in the Wallpaper* Design Awards 2024.

== Overview ==
The studio's output includes pendant lights, chandeliers, wall-mounted fixtures, and modular lighting systems. Manufacturing and assembly are carried out in Canada, combining standardized components with manual finishing.
