= Sara Baume =

Irish writer (born 1984)

- Born: 1984 (age 41–42)
- Education: Dún Laoghaire Institute of Art, Design and Technology
- Writing career
- Notable awards: Rooney Prize

Sara Baume (born 1984) is an Irish novelist. She was named on Granta's Best of Young British Novelists list in 2023.

== Biography ==
Her father is of English descent while her mother is of Irish descent. As her parents travelled around in a caravan, Sara Baume was born "on the road to Wigan Pier". When she was four years old, they moved to County Cork, Ireland. She studied fine art at Dún Laoghaire Institute of Art and Design and creative writing at Trinity College Dublin from where she was awarded her MPhil. She has received a Literary Fellowship from the Lannan Foundation in Santa Fe, New Mexico. Her books are published by Tramp Press in Ireland and Heinemann in Britain.

In 2015, she participated in the International Writing Program's Fall Residency at the University of Iowa, in Iowa City, Iowa.

In 2023, she was named on Granta's Best of Young British Novelists list, compiled every 10 years since 1983, to identify the 20 most significant British novelists aged under 40.

== Awards and honours ==
=== Literary awards ===
Year	Title	Award	Category	Result	Ref.
2015	—	Hennessy New Irish Writing Award	—	Won	
2015	—	Rooney Prize for Irish Literature	—	Won	
2015	Spill Simmer Falter Wither	Costa Book Award	First Novel	Shortlisted	
2015	Spill Simmer Falter Wither	Geoffrey Faber Memorial Prize	Fiction	Won	
2015	Spill Simmer Falter Wither	Guardian First Book Award	—	Longlisted	
2015	Spill Simmer Falter Wither	Irish Book Award	Sunday Independent Newcomer of the Year	Won	
2016	Spill Simmer Falter Wither	Desmond Elliott Prize	—	Longlisted	
2016	Spill Simmer Falter Wither	Kate O'Brien Award	—	Won	
2017	Spill Simmer Falter Wither	Los Angeles Times Book Prize	Art Seidenbaum Award for First Fiction	Shortlisted	
2017	A Line Made By Walking	Booklist Editors' Choice	Adult Books	Selection	
2017	A Line Made By Walking	Goldsmiths Prize	—	Shortlisted	
2021	handiwork	Rathbones Folio Prize	—	Shortlisted	
2022	Seven Steeples	An Post Irish Book Awards	Eason Novel of the Year	Shortlisted	
2022	Seven Steeples	Goldsmiths Prize	—	Shortlisted	
2023	Seven Steeples	Dylan Thomas Prize	—	Shortlisted	

=== Other awards ===
- Davy Byrne's Short Story Award for Solesearcher1, 2014

== Novels ==
- —— (2015). Spill Simmer Falter Wither. Dublin: Tramp Press. ISBN 9780992817060.
- —— (2017). A Line Made by Walking. Boston; New York: Houghton Mifflin Harcourt. ISBN 9780544716957.^{α}
- —— (2020). handiwork. Dublin: Tramp Press. ISBN 9781916434257.
- —— (2022). Seven Steeples. Dublin: Tramp Press. ISBN 9781916291485.

== Notes ==
^α (named for the Richard Long sculpture, A Line Made by Walking)
