= Kelly Gallagher =

Kelly Gallagher may refer to:

- Kelly Gallagher (alpine skier), British alpine skier
- Kelly Wearstler (born 1967), interior designer and former Playboy model (under the pseudonym Gallagher)
