= Mitra Tabrizian =

Mitra Tabrizian (Persian: میترا تبریزیان; born in Tehran) is a British-Iranian photographer and film director. She is a professor of photography at the University of Westminster, London. Mitra Tabrizian has exhibited and published widely and in major international museums and galleries, including her solo exhibition at the Tate Britain in 2008. Her book, Another Country, with texts by Homi Bhabha, David Green, and Hamid Naficy, was published by Hatje Cantz in 2012.

== Early life and career ==
Born in Tehran, Iran, Tabrizian studied at the Polytechnic of Central London in the 1980s. Tabrizian published her first monograph, Correct Distance, in 1990. In 1992, she was included in a survey edition of Ten.8 magazine "Critical decade: Black British photography in the 80s". Her book of photographs, Beyond the Limits (2004), is a critique of corporate culture and is inspired by the works of Jean Baudrillard and Jean-François Lyotard. Her films include Journey of No Return (1993), The Third Woman (1991), and The Predator (2004).

Tabrizian has exhibited her work at the Tate, Modern Art Oxford, Gallery Lelong, New York, the Architectural Association, London, and numerous film festivals. In January 2018, she exhibited at London Art Fair with Arte Globale.

== Publications ==
- Correct Distance. Manchester: Cornerhouse, 1990. With a text by Griselda Pollock.
- Beyond the limits. Göttingen, Germany: Steidl, 2004. With texts by Stuart Hall, Christopher Williams, Francette Pacteau and a contribution from Homi K. Bhabha.
- This is That Place. London: Tate, 2008. Catalogue. With a text by T. J. Demos.
- Another Country. Berlin: Hatje Cantz, 2012. With texts by Bhabha, David Green, and Hamid Naficy.

== Films ==
- The Third Woman (1991) – writer and director, 16 mm, 20 mins
- Journey of No Return (1993) – writer and director, 16 mm, 23 mins
- The Predator (2004) – writer and director, 35 mm, 28 mins
- Gholam (2017) – writer and director, 94 mins

== Solo exhibitions ==
- Museum of Folkwang, Germany, 2003
- Jenseits der Grenzen, (Beyond the Limits), Künstlerhaus Bethanien, Berlin, Germany, 2004
- BBK, Bilbao, Spain, 2004
- "The 1st at Moderna: Mitra Tabrizian," Moderna Musset (Museum of Modern art), Stockholm, Sweden, 2006
- "Mitra Tabrizian: This is that Place," Tate, London, 2008
- Caprice Horn Gallery, Berlin (June- Sept.), 2008
- "Mitra Tabrizian," Albion Gallery, London, 2009
- 'Project B, Contemporary Art', Milan (Feb.-April), 2011

== Group exhibitions ==
- The Selectors' Show, Camerawork, London, UK, 1984
- Mitra Tabrizian, Victor Burgin, Mari Mahr, The Photographers Gallery, London, UK,1986
- Shocks to the System: Social and Political Issues in Recent British Art from the Arts Council Collection, South Bank Centre, London, UK, 1991
- Fine Material for a Dream...? A Reappraisal of Orientalism, Harris Museum & Art Gallery, Preston, UK, 1992

== Awards ==
- 2021: Honorary Fellowship of the Royal Photographic Society
- 2005. Arts & Humanities Research Center (AHRC) Research Leave Grant
- 2005. The Arts Council, UK
- 2004. Arts & Humanities Research Center (AHRC) Grants in the Creative & Performing Arts
- 2004. The Arts Council, UK
- 2003. Arts & Humanities Research Board (AHRB) Innovation Awards
- 1996. London Arts Board
- 1993. British Film Institute
- 1993. Greater London Arts (GLA), film award British Film Institute
- 1993. Photographers' Gallery Trust Fund
- 1987. Metro Billboard Project, Newcastle, UK
- 1987. Greater London Arts, Photography award
- 1985. National Museum of Photography, Film & Television, photography award UK
- 1985. Greater London Arts, photography award
- 1985. Arts Council photography award, UK

== Sources ==
- Brighton Photo Biennial 2006. Artists, Mitra Tabrizian. Accessed 18 December 2007.
- University of Westminster. Centre for Research and Education in Art and Media (CREAM), Research Staff, s.v. "Prof. Mitra Tabrizian". Accessed 18 December 2007.
- Steidl. Artists, "Mitra Tabrizian". Accessed 18 December 2007.
