= Kelly Wearstler =

American interior designer and model

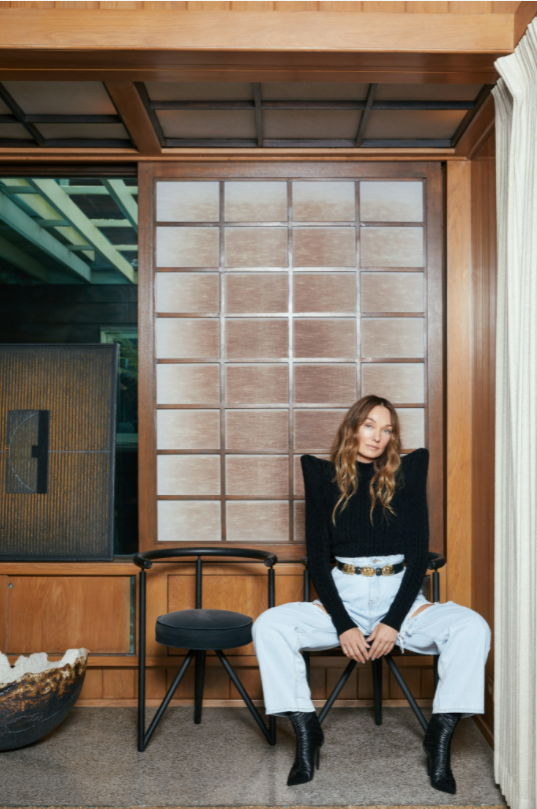
- Wearstler in 2021
- Born: November 21, 1967 (age 58); Myrtle Beach, South Carolina, U.S.
- Education: Massachusetts College of Art
- Occupations: Interior designer, author, entrepreneur
- Years active: 1995–present
- Spouse: Brad Korzen (m. 2002)
- Children: 3
- Awards: AD100 Hall of Fame (2021-2026); "Elle Decor" A-List (2015-Present); Elle Decor A-List Legends (2026); Wallpaper* USA 400 (2025, 2026); Time Style & Design 100 (2007)
- Website: kellywearstler.com

Kelly Wearstler (born November 21, 1967) is an American interior designer, author, and entrepreneur. She founded her firm, Kelly Wearstler Interior Design, in Los Angeles in 1995, and leads a multidisciplinary studio working across residential, commercial, retail, and hospitality interiors, as well as product and furniture design and lifestyle collections. She serves as lead designer of the Proper Hotels brand. The New Yorker described her in 2009 as "the presiding grande dame of West Coast interior design," and Architectural Digest has written that her "bold, maximalist approach has significantly shaped our perception of modern American interior spaces."

Wearstler has authored six books, including Synchronicity (Rizzoli, 2023), taught the first interior-design course on MasterClass, partnered with H&M Home on a global collection, and founded the gallery Side Hustle in 2025. She has appeared on Architectural Digest's AD100 list annually since 2011 and was inducted into its Hall of Fame in 2021, is a member of Elle Decor's A-List and was named to its inaugural Legends class in 2026, and has appeared on Wallpaper*'s USA 400 list.

== Early life and education ==
Wearstler was born on November 21, 1967 in Myrtle Beach, South Carolina. Her father was an engineer and her mother an antique dealer, whose interest in design influenced Wearstler from a young age. As a child she would come home from school to find rooms freshly painted in new colors, and she and her older sister accompanied their mother to thrift shops, auctions, and flea markets, which helped develop her early interest in fashion and design. She took a babysitting job at 12 and began working in a beachside café at 13, using her earnings to buy vintage jewelry and clothing.

Wearstler attended the Massachusetts College of Art and Design in Boston, where she took architecture classes and earned a bachelor's degree in interior and graphic design. While paying her way through college by waitressing, she held internships at the design firm Cambridge Seven Associates in Boston and with graphic designer Milton Glaser — the studio responsible for the I Love New York logo — in New York. She then relocated to Los Angeles, where, hoping to become a set decorator, she found piecemeal work in the art departments of films; one such job led to a commission to refurbish a room in a producer's house, an early step toward her design practice. Her film work has been described as encompassing set decoration and art direction, and elsewhere as production-assistant work on film sets. In 1994 she was featured in Playboy, later saying she used the proceeds to help pay off student loans and start her business.

== Early career ==
Wearstler has described her first design project as her own Los Angeles apartment, on Detroit Street in the Hancock Park neighborhood. Working with little money, she painted the walls, redid the floors, and carried out much of the renovation herself. She hired an interior photographer to shoot the apartment; he was assembling a portfolio of up-and-coming designers and encouraged her to submit the images to Elle Décor, which published them. According to Wearstler, the exposure and subsequent word-of-mouth referrals launched her practice: a referral led her to decorate two rooms of a friend's home, which grew into the full house, after which another observer of that project brought further commissions.

In 1995, Wearstler founded her own firm, Kelly Wearstler Interior Design (KWID), initially working alone from her Los Angeles apartment; the firm's early focus was residential design. A personal introduction led to a commission from real estate developer Brad Korzen — whom she married in 2002 — to design his home, and Korzen subsequently engaged her for properties owned by his company; her interiors for the Avalon Hotel in Beverly Hills (1999) became her breakthrough into hospitality design.

In 2006, a commission for the BG Restaurant at Bergdorf Goodman led the retailer to invite her to open a boutique, or shop-in-shop, in 2007 — the beginning of the studio's product-design practice. In the years that followed, the studio expanded into the multidisciplinary practice described below, working across hospitality, residential, commercial, and retail interiors, product and furniture design, curation, and media. By 2025 the studio employed a team of 65.

== Work ==
=== Hospitality ===
Wearstler's first major hospitality project was the Avalon Hotel in Beverly Hills, commissioned by developer Brad Korzen and reopened in 1999 with a style described in the press as "a playful take on mid-century modernism." The New York Times later wrote that "her playful, elegantly over-the-top designs for the Avalon Beverly Hills changed the look of boutique hotels around the world." In 2001 she redesigned Maison 140, a boutique hotel in Beverly Hills, as a fusion of French and Asian styles. Her work on these properties led to a commission for the Viceroy Hotels and Resorts chain. The Viceroy Palm Springs was described as "her most accomplished work" in 2001, and the Viceroy Santa Monica opened the following year. She also completed Viceroy properties in Miami and Anguilla. Since the mid-2010s, hospitality has been the studio's most prominent body of work, anchored by Wearstler's role as lead designer of the Proper Hotels brand. She designed the San Francisco (2017), Santa Monica (2019), Austin (2019), and Downtown Los Angeles (2021) Proper hotels, together with their restaurants and bars; the Downtown L.A. Proper Hotel won Hotel and short-stay interior of the year at the 2022 Dezeen Awards. Her broader hospitality portfolio includes the Four Seasons Anguilla (2016). In December 2025, she completed the dining spaces, the Beefbar restaurant, at L'Apogée Courchevel in the French Alps — her first European hospitality project — in a raw, tactile style the press described as "Alpine Brutalism"; the hotel's interiors are by Joseph Dirand and India Mahdavi. The hotel holds the French government's Palace distinction — a status that predates her work there — which was among the 27 renewed when Atout France announced its 2026 Palace collection of 33 hotels. In 2025 the studio was reported to be working on the Cal Neva Lodge at Lake Tahoe and on interiors for Kappo Kappo, a sushi restaurant at the Austin Proper Hotel.

=== Residential ===
Residential design was the original focus of Wearstler's firm and remains a core practice of the studio alongside its hospitality work. Her residential clients have included Cameron Diaz, whose prewar West Village apartment in Manhattan she designed in a palette drawn from burnished metals and minerals — malachite, onyx, rose gold, silver, and copper — featured in ELLE Decor in 2013, and Gwen Stefani, whose seven-bedroom Beverly Hills mansion she decorated with contrasting marbles, graphic black-and-white patterns, and vivid color. Published studio projects in Southern California include the Marlboro Residence, the Malibu Beach Residence, and the Beverly Hills Residence. Wearstler has said that many of her residential commissions are never published, at her clients' request for privacy. The Financial Times reported in 2025 that the studio's residential work then under way included houses in Bangkok, Melbourne, and Stockholm. In a 2009 profile for The New Yorker, Dana Goodyear called her "the presiding grande dame of West Coast interior design."

=== Commercial and retail ===
Wearstler's commercial and retail work began with the BG Restaurant at Bergdorf Goodman in 2006 and the shop-in-shop that followed in 2007. In 2017, the $1 billion redevelopment of Westfield Century City in Los Angeles, for which she designed the public spaces, reopened. Alongside the retail boutiques she opened in Los Angeles during the 2010s, she added a concession at Harrods in London in 2022. In 2023, she designed the two-storey West Hollywood flagship store for the fashion brand Ulla Johnson.

=== Product and furniture design ===
The 2007 Bergdorf Goodman boutique marked the start of a product-design practice that expanded substantially through the 2010s and 2020s, producing furniture, lighting, tableware, textiles, and home accessories under the studio's own label and through the collaborations tabulated below. Recent work includes the Echo furniture collection (2024), tableware and her first outdoor ceramics with Serax (2023, 2025), bar accessories with Giobagnara (2024), a collection with Mumbai's Aequo gallery, a global home collection with H&M Home unveiled at Milan Design Week (2026), and her first piano, a rimless birchwood design named Timbra, with Edelweiss Pianos (2026). Her 2021 paint palette with Farrow & Ball was the British manufacturer's first collaboration with an outside designer in its 75-year history. The Financial Times reported in 2025 that her product business alone had revenue in excess of $150 million.

Product collaborations
Year	Partner	Collection	Cite
2011	The Rug Company	Rugs and textiles (ongoing; new collections 2019, 2025)	
2014	Visual Comfort	Lighting	
2015	Lee Jofa	Fabrics, wall coverings, and trims	
2016	Ann Sacks	Tile and stone collections (ongoing) — Liaison, Maven and Tableau (2016), Gem encaustic tiles (2017), and later MADE series	
2019	Georg Jensen	"Frequency" home accessories with the Danish silver and steel house — described by Wallpaper* as the brand's first significant steel collaboration with an American designer; developed from 2017	
2021	Farrow & Ball	California-inspired paint collection — the brand's first collaboration with an outside designer	
2022, 2024	Arca	"NUDO" collection — 16 furniture pieces and six accessories in marble and onyx, debuted during Design Miami/Art Basel Miami Beach 2022; a second stone furniture collection followed at Design Miami 2024	
2023, 2025	Serax	Dune & Zuma tableware; outdoor ceramics	
2024	Giobagnara	Maris bar accessories	
2024	Echo	Echo furniture collection	
2025	Aequo	Furniture, lighting & accessories	
2026	H&M Home	Global home collection (Milan Design Week)	
2026	Edelweiss Pianos	"Timbra" piano	

=== Curation and gallery ===
In 2025, Wearstler founded Side Hustle, a collectible-design gallery at her Beverly Hills home dedicated to emerging and established artists and designers. Conceived as a curatorial platform operating both online and in physical exhibitions rather than a traditional gallery, it commissions original and editioned works across disciplines ranging from sculpture, craft, and jewelry to performance, film, culinary culture, and automotive design. The debut exhibition, "Again, Differently," opened in October 2025 in the pool house of Wearstler's Beverly Hills estate — a 1926 mansion formerly owned by film producer Albert Broccoli, whose family used the space as a private screening room for James Bond films — and presented works by ten international artists, including Leonor Antunes, Sonia Gomes, Dozie Kanu, and Nynke Koster. Koster's contribution comprised furniture made from rubber and polyurethane castings of the mansion's architectural details.

== Design approach ==
Wearstler works in a style commonly described as maximalist, combining modern and historical references with strong color, graphic pattern, and contrasting materials and textures. In a 2006 profile, The New York Times credited her — following the minimalism of the 1990s — with helping return decorative richness to American interiors, and in 2019 the Financial Times described her as "the woman who brought West Coast style to the world."

Wearstler has said she does not work to a fixed signature style, approaching each project instead as a chance to layer different eras, materials, and design movements. She has described her process as beginning conceptually — researching history, materials, and texture before a scheme takes shape — and as driven by contrast, setting old against new and raw against refined while balancing bold color and pattern with restraint.

She has characterized technology and traditional craft as complementary, describing artificial intelligence and other emerging tools as aids to her creative process rather than a threat to it. Her studio began using generative-AI tools such as Midjourney and DALL-E in 2021, and she has called AI an "ally" and "one of the greatest tools for growth" that has "exponentially enriched our creative process," while stressing that it serves as an aid to iteration and research rather than a substitute for design judgment: "We are using it as a tool, and we are editing and we are curating." A 2023 New York Times profile noted the studio's exploration of AI as a brainstorming aid. She has also framed her work as extending beyond interiors to connect disciplines such as architecture, fashion, and art.

== Writing and media ==
Wearstler taught the inaugural interior-design course on MasterClass in 2020 and delivered a keynote at the Business of Fashion VOICES conference in November 2023.

Her editorial and writing work includes guest-editing Wallpaper*'s October 2022 issue, a first-person essay in the Financial Times' House & Home section (February 2025) on rebuilding after the loss of her Malibu house in the Los Angeles wildfires, writing for Harper's Bazaar Nederland, whose September 2023 cover she also fronted, bylined gift guides for Vogue, and a first-person review of the Fall 2024 fashion-month collections for Coveteur, in which she described attending the London, Milan, and Paris shows and drawing on fashion as a point of departure for the studio's furniture, lighting, textiles, and interiors, and WEARSTLERWORLD, a weekly Substack newsletter launched in December 2024. By late 2025 the newsletter had more than 30,000 subscribers and ranked second among Substack's design bestsellers; as of July 2026, it is the top-ranked newsletter in Substack's design category.

She has been a guest on several podcasts. On Jay Shetty's On Purpose (2023), she discussed the emotional effect of designed environments, her early career, and balancing creative work with family life; on Rick Rubin's Tetragrammaton (2026), her multidisciplinary design process and the role of materiality, place, and storytelling in her hotel and residential projects; and on Emma Grede's Aspire (2026), the business of design, including scaling her studio while preserving its brand identity and the studio's use of artificial intelligence. From 2007 to 2008 she served as a judge on Bravo's design-competition series Top Design.

Wearstler was an early adopter of social media among interior designers — the design journalist Dan Rubinstein described her in 2024 as "one of the first major designers to really wield the full power of Instagram" — and by 2022 she had amassed nearly two million Instagram followers, rising to 2.2 million by 2025. Surveying a practice spanning interiors, hospitality, collectible design, digital content, and product licensing, Architectural Digest in 2025 described a "multichannel empire" and characterized her as an early adopter of new technologies.

== Collaborations ==
Beyond her studio's own product lines, Wearstler has been engaged by consumer and luxury brands as a creative collaborator and public face.

In 2021, Wearstler designed a virtual, computer-generated "garage" home in the Southern California desert to mark the launch of GMC's Hummer EV, which she said she imagined for its brand ambassador, LeBron James.

Wearstler has worked repeatedly with the fashion house Dior. In 2023, Dior Maison enlisted her to style its dinnerware collection in a Thanksgiving tablescape campaign framed around her own holiday gathering. She has also attended the house's prêt-à-porter shows in Paris, appearing in "getting ready" features by L'Officiel (Spring/Summer 2024) and V Magazine (Autumn/Winter 2024), and being named in Footwear News's front-row coverage of the Autumn/Winter 2024 show in Paris.

In 2025, she was one of three creative figures for whom Johnnie Walker's master blender, Emma Walker, created bespoke whisky blends drawn from the label's Vault library. Wearstler's blend was described as "sweet and salty," evoking Santa Monica and her memories of surfing in Costa Rica, and she connected it to her design ethos of "old soul, new spirit." Later that year, through Airbnb's artist-led experiences program at Art Basel Miami Beach, she hosted "Exploring the Art of Curation," a workshop in the fair's collectors' lounge in which participants built "vibe trays" — the layered boards of swatches, textures, and imagery she uses as a creative tool in her studio.

In 2026, Williams-Sonoma partnered with Wearstler to launch Breville's "Mixed Metals" collection of countertop appliances, which pairs brushed stainless steel with brass detailing as an evolution of Breville's earlier Brass Collection; she styled the campaign in her own kitchen.

== Selected works ==
Year	Project	Type	Location	Ref.
2006	BG Restaurant, Bergdorf Goodman	Commercial / retail	New York City	
2016	Four Seasons Anguilla	Hospitality	Anguilla	
2017	Westfield Century City renovation	Commercial	Los Angeles	
2017	San Francisco Proper Hotel	Hospitality	San Francisco	
2019	Santa Monica Proper Hotel	Hospitality	Santa Monica	
2019	Austin Proper Hotel	Hospitality	Austin	
2020	Malibu beach house (the designer's own home; destroyed January 2025)	Residential	Malibu	
2021	Downtown L.A. Proper Hotel (Dezeen Award, 2022)	Hospitality	Los Angeles	
2023	Ulla Johnson flagship store	Retail	West Hollywood, Los Angeles	
2025	Side Hustle gallery	Cultural	Beverly Hills	
2025	L'Apogée Courchevel (dining spaces / Beefbar)	Hospitality	Courchevel, France	

== Bibliography ==
Year	Title	Role	Publisher	ISBN
2004	Modern Glamour	Author (with Jane Bogart)	New York: HarperCollins	ISBN 0-06-039442-0
2006	Domicilium Decoratus	Author	New York: HarperCollins	ISBN 0-06-089798-8
2009	Hue	Author	Pasadena: AMMO Books	ISBN 1-934429-35-X
2012	Rhapsody	Author	New York: Rizzoli	ISBN 978-0-8478-3858-5
2019	Evocative Style	Author (with Rima Suqi)	New York: Rizzoli	ISBN 978-0-8478-6603-8
2023	Synchronicity	Author	New York: Rizzoli	ISBN 978-0-8478-7342-5

== Recognition ==
In its AD100 Hall of Fame profile, Architectural Digest wrote that Wearstler "redefined the dynamics of design authority, steering attention toward Los Angeles" from New York, and that her "bold, maximalist approach has significantly shaped our perception of modern American interior spaces."

Year	Organization	Award / List	Ref.
2007	Time	The Style & Design 100	
—	Vogue	Best-dressed list	
2011–present	Architectural Digest	AD100 (annual)	
2015–present	Elle Decor	A-List (multiple years)	
2021	Architectural Digest	AD100 Hall of Fame (inducted; re-listed in later classes)	
2022	Dezeen Awards	Hotel and short-stay interior of the year — DTLA Proper (won)	
2024–2026	Wallpaper*	USA 400	
2026	Elle Decor	A-List Legends (inaugural class)	

== Philanthropy ==
In 2022, Wearstler established the Kelly Wearstler Endowed Fund for Design Students at the University of Texas at Austin School of Architecture, providing undergraduate scholarships and graduate fellowships for design students with financial need. The endowment forms part of a broader partnership with the school's interior design program that includes summer internships, recruitment and employment placement, and on-campus workshops. She has also returned to the university as a speaker, including a College of Fine Arts talk on careers in AI and design.

In 2018, Wearstler became the first designer to participate in the Design Challenge Program of A Sense of Home, a Los Angeles nonprofit that creates homes for young people aging out of foster care, furnishing a South Los Angeles apartment with pieces from her own collections.

In September 2024, Wearstler was honored by Best Friends Animal Society at its "Benefit to Save Them All" in New York City for her contributions to animal welfare.

== Personal life ==
Wearstler and her husband, real estate developer Brad Korzen, married in 2002 and have three sons. The family has remodeled and sold a number of houses in Southern California, including the former Beverly Hills estate of film producer Albert Broccoli, which they moved into and renovated beginning in 2007. Wearstler and Korzen have maintained homes in both Malibu and Beverly Hills. Their longtime Malibu beach house was destroyed in the January 2025 Los Angeles wildfires, and as of late 2025 the family was rebuilding.

Anna-Marie Goddard	Julie Lynn Cialini	Neriah Davis	Becky DelosSantos	Shae Marks	Elan Carter
Traci Adell	Maria Checa	Kelly Gallagher	Victoria Zdrok	Donna Perry	Elisa Bridges
