= Roche Court Sculpture Park and Gallery =

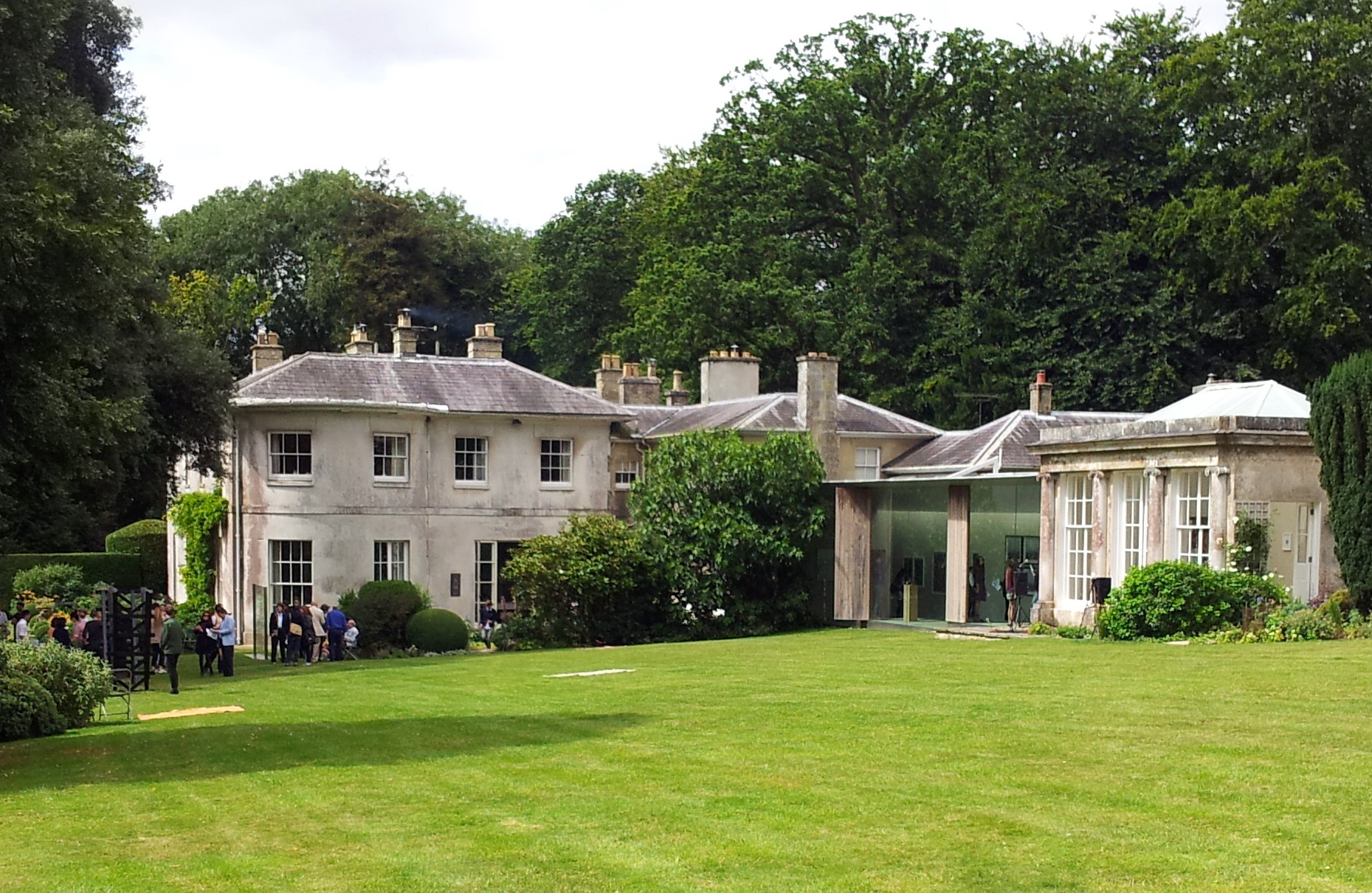
Rouche Court in 2015. On the right some of the gallery spaces

Roche Court Sculpture Park and Gallery, also known as New Art Centre, Roche Court Sculpture Park, is a contemporary art gallery and sculpture park on the grounds of Roche Court, an early 19th-century country house in East Winterslow, Wiltshire, England. It was founded in 1958 by Madeleine Besborough (née Grand) as New Art Centre, a contemporary art gallery at 41, Sloane Street, London. In 1978, the gallery relocated to Wiltshire and a sculpture park was added. The gallery and sculpture park are open seven days a week. There is no admission fee.

== History ==
The Sloane Street gallery was founded in 1958 by 22-year old Madeleine Grand (born 1935). The New Art Centre initially was a non-profit gallery that aimed to promote the work of young artists. About the early days of the London gallery, its founder remarked sixty years later: “The art world was very different when we started. There were barely any opportunities for the young to be offered exhibitions, and it was something I wanted to change. [...] The truth is that I didn’t have any money when I started. We managed to find a sponsor and a sandwich shop on Sloane Street, and we gutted it ourselves.”

A few years later, the gallery abandoned its initial non-profit idealism and continued on a commercial basis. There were exhibitions of St Ives school artists and New Generation sculptors, and Grand invited provocative artists like Peter Logan, who was making kinetic sculptures, and Derek Jarman, who had members of The Royal Ballet dancing nude in the basement.

In 1963, Grand married Arthur Ponsonby, 11th Earl of Bessborough (1912–2002), after which she was known as Madeleine Ponsonby, Countess of Bessborough. She continued to run the Sloane Street gallery until 1994. By that time the rent of the London property had become unaffordable and the gallery relocated to Roche Court, the Ponsonby's early 19th-century country house in Wiltshire, nine miles east of Salisbury. At around the same time, the gallery was asked to manage the estate of Barbara Hepworth, a responsibility they still hold. Lady Besborough's husband, Arthur Ponsonby, managed the surrounding farmland until his death in 2002. It still serves as a working farm today, with cattle, sheep and hens, as well as sculptures dotted around the fields.

== Art gallery ==
Since 1994 the gallery space has been expanded in collaboration with Scottish architect Stephen Marshall. His first project was the 1998 corridor-like sculpture gallery between the main house and a freestanding orangery. The minimalist structure was awarded the RIBA Stephen Lawrence Award in 1999, as well as several other prizes. A few years later, Marshall added the two-story Artist's House, an exhibition space made to look like a home. In 2018 Marshall completed the Design House, a renovated and expanded cottage in a walled garden, which is now the center's largest exhibition space, though it has a residential feel similar to the Artist's House. The latest addition is the Stable Gallery. Among the many artists that had exhibitions in the Roche Court galleries are Edmund de Waal, Matthew Hilton, Tom Dixon, Katie Walker, Eva Rothschild and Yinka Shonibare.

== Sculpture park ==
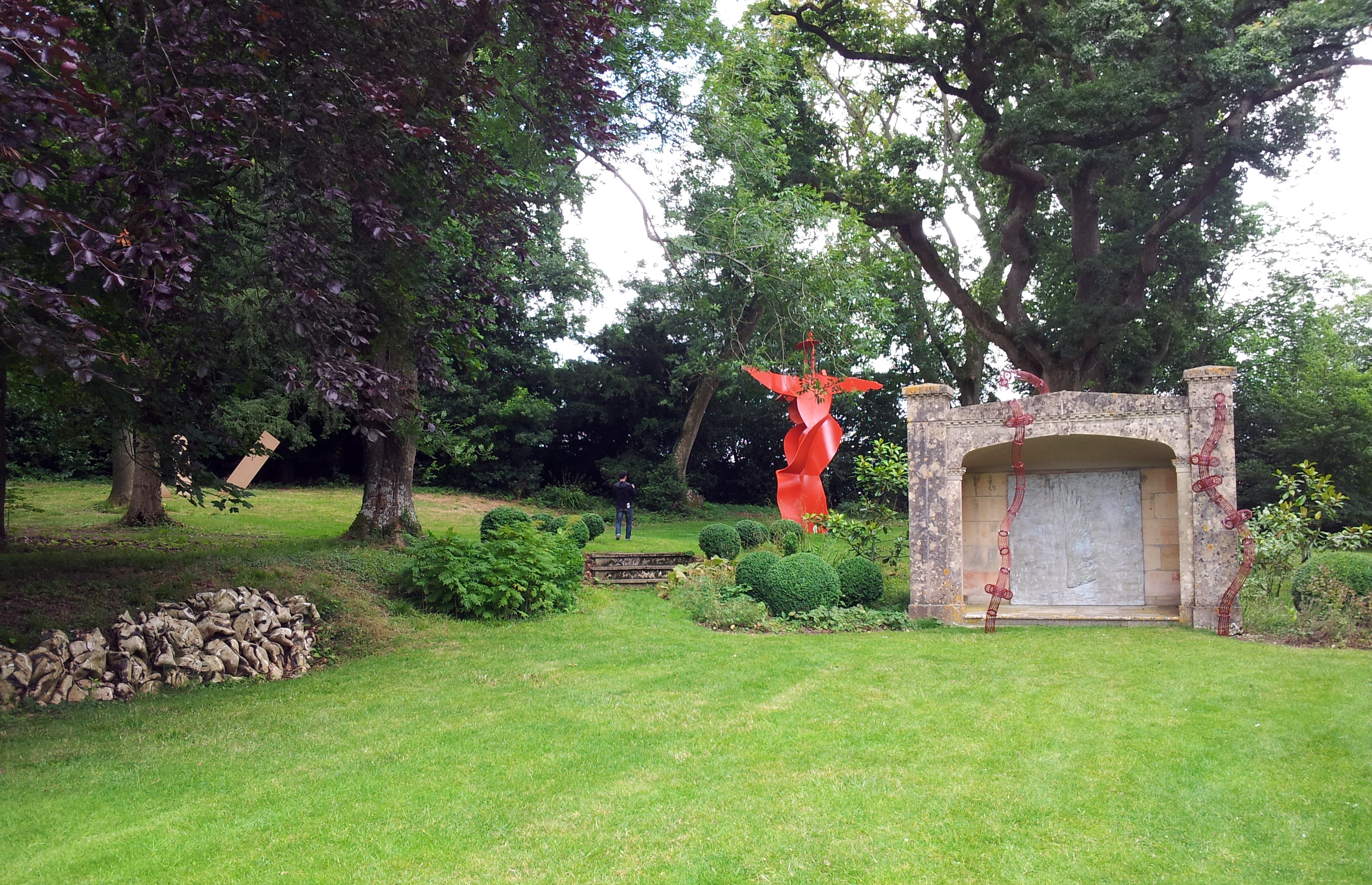
Roche Court sculpture garden

When Madeleine Ponsonby moved the gallery to Wiltshire, she envisioned the seventy acres of gardens, woodlands and pastures, or at least part of it, turned into a huge sculpture park: “When I came here, there were no places, apart from the Yorkshire Sculpture Park, where artists could show big works outside.” The park features sculptures by well-known British artists such as Barbara Hepworth, Anthony Caro, Kenneth Armitage, Julian Opie, Richard Long, Barry Flanagan, Michael Craig-Martin, Christopher Le Brun, Nigel Hall, Conrad Shawcross, Gavin Turk, Antony Gormley and Phyllida Barlow. Although some of the works remain in place for a long time, every piece is for sale.

== Roche Court Educational Trust ==
The Roche Court Educational Trust uses gallery profits to fund an arts education programme with guided visits and workshops for local schools. The trust also runs ARTiculation, a national competition that encourages young people to engage in public speaking through art. Around 4,000 participate annually. The charity has a permanent staff of five. The sculptor Bill Woodrow is chair. Lady Besborough is a trustee.
