= Ashleys Copse =

Iron Age hillfort in Hampshire, England

Coordinates: 51.1124°N 1.6304°W

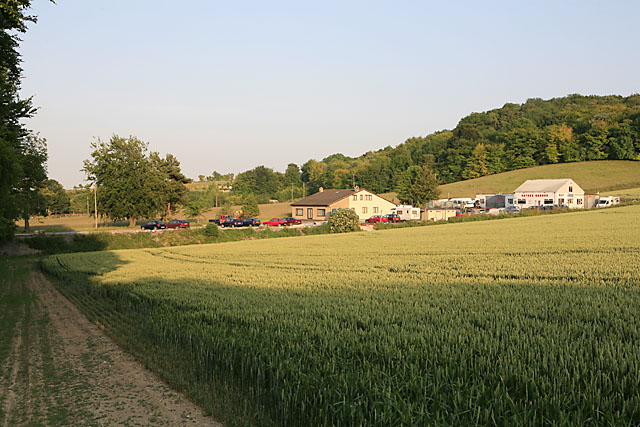
Buildings at Lopcombe Corner, below the hillfort

Ashley's Copse is the site of an Iron Age hillfort, about 8 miles (13 km) northeast of the city of Salisbury, England, straddling the border between the counties of Wiltshire and Hampshire. The site is a scheduled monument.

Half the site is wooded, and here can be found the best preserved earthworks, but there is also visible evidence of some of the earthworks on the eastern spur of the hill. To the southeast of the fort lies a steep valley, forming a natural defence. The flanks to the north and east are also tightly contoured but the ground on the other aspects slopes less steeply. The fort site is not on the summit of the (unnamed) hill, but lies slightly to the east of the 166m AOD summit, at between 155m and 160m AOD.

== Location ==
The site is to the northeast of the village of Middle Winterslow, and falls mostly within the county of Hampshire, and partly within the county of Wiltshire.

- Map sources for Ashleys Copse
