= Winterslow =

Civil parish in Wiltshire, England

Coordinates: 51.094°N 1.662°W

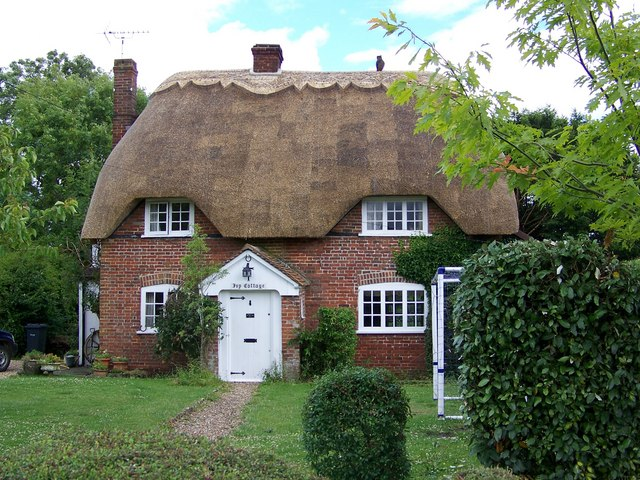
- Cottage at East Winterslow

- Location within Wiltshire
- Population: 2,064 (in 2011)
- OS grid reference: SU2332
- Civil parish: Winterslow
- Unitary authority: Wiltshire
- Ceremonial county: Wiltshire
- Region: South West
- Country: England
- Sovereign state: United Kingdom
- Post town: Salisbury
- Postcode district: SP5
- Dialling code: 01980
- Police: Wiltshire
- Fire: Dorset and Wiltshire
- Ambulance: South Western
- UK Parliament: Salisbury
- Website: Parish Council

Winterslow is a civil parish with a population of around 2,000, about 6 miles (10 km) northeast of Salisbury in Wiltshire, England, and lying south of the A30 London Road. It is sited on the Roman road between Old Sarum and Winchester.

Settlements in the parish are the villages of West Winterslow and Middle Winterslow, and the hamlets of East Winterslow and The Common.

== History ==
The area has evidence of prehistoric settlements, including Bronze Age features and an Iron Age hillfort at Ashley's Copse, straddling the border with Hampshire in the northeast of the parish.

Middle Winterslow lies along a Roman road which runs due west towards Old Sarum. The three settlements (today's West, Middle and East Winterslow) are recorded in the 1086 Domesday Book as Wintreslei, meaning "Winter's mound or burial place".

The Winterslows developed as separate manors, with Middle Winterslow known for a time as Middleton. As recently as 1958, the village around All Saints' church was named on maps as Winterslow, with West Winterslow adjacent to its southeast. On current maps and road signs, both areas are West Winterslow.

From the 17th century, the Winterslow Hut was a roadside coaching inn near Middle Winterslow. Later the Pheasant Hotel or Pheasant Inn, the business closed in 2007 and the much-altered building is now four dwellings.

== Governance ==
The civil parish elects a parish council. It is in the area of Wiltshire Council unitary authority, which is responsible for all significant local government functions.

An electoral ward in the same name exists. This ward starts on the outskirts of Salisbury in the south west and stretches in a northeasterly direction to Winterslow. The total ward population taken at the 2011 census was 3,894.

== Religious sites ==
=== Parish church ===
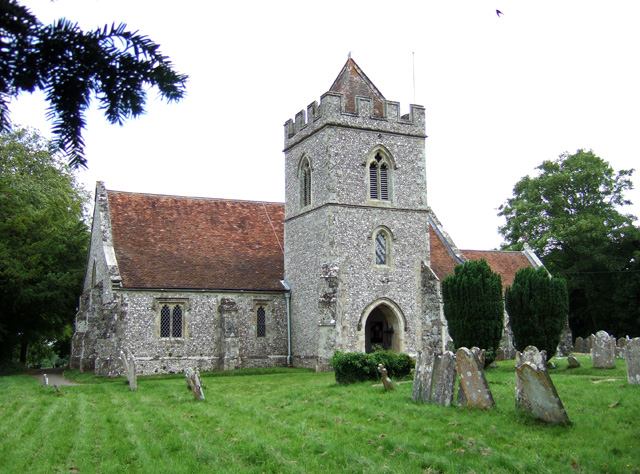
All Saints' Church

The Church of England parish church of All Saints at West Winterslow dates from the early 12th century, but was largely rebuilt in 1849–51 by T.H. Wyatt, using coursed flint. Pevsner writes that it is externally mostly Wyatt's work. It has a small chancel, an aisled nave which was doubled in length by Wyatt, and a south porch with two-stage tower above, capped with a pyramidal tiled roof. Surviving 12th-century features are the east part of the nave the south aisle, as well as the simple tub font. The north aisle was added in the 13th century; the chancel is all Wyatt's, apart from the 13th-century chancel arch. The church was designated as Grade II* listed in 1960.

The pulpit is mostly 17th century. One of the six bells was cast by John Wallis in 1593; the others were recast by John Taylor & Co in 1910, when the peal was rehung. A 1918 window in the north aisle, in colourful Pre-Raphaelite style, is by Karl Parsons.

Eastern parts of the parishes of Winterbourne Dauntsey and Winterbourne Gunner were transferred to Winterslow parish in 1956. Today the church is one of the Clarendon group, alongside eight others.

=== Others ===
A brick and flint chapel of ease dedicated to St John the Baptist was opened at The Common in 1860, and is also part of the Clarendon group.

A Methodist chapel was built at The Common in 1810; the present building dates from 1865.

An Evangelical church, the Gospel Lifeboat Mission, was opened at Middle Winterslow in 1891. The present building is from 1979.

Winterslow Baptist Church, at West Winterslow, is a tin tabernacle built in 1908.

== Notable buildings ==
Roche Old Court at East Winterslow, a former manor house and farm (named for the Roches family, tenants of an estate in the 14th century) was partly rebuilt around 1620 in red brick with stone quoins. The house has six bays and 18th-century additions, and is Grade II* listed. A six-bay barn from the 16th century or early 17th is also Grade II* listed. There is another Grade II* barn of similar age at Old Manor Farm, West Winterslow.

Also near East Winterslow, Roche Court is a country house standing in parkland, built in 1804–5 to replace an earlier house, for Francis Thomas Egerton to designs of the London architect C. H. Tatham. The two-storey house in limestone ashlar at first had a four-bay front but three bays were added at the left side; the entrance has a tetrastyle Tuscan portico. The house was designated as Grade II* listed in 1987. The orangery and garden loggia are thought to be part of the original garden design, in the same period as the house. The stable block is also of 19th-century date.

Madeleine Ponsonby (née Grand), who founded the New Art Centre in Sloane Street, London in 1958, relocated the gallery to Roche Court in 1994 as the New Art Centre Sculpture Park and Gallery. Exhibition spaces have been added to the property, including a 1998 glass wall which links the house and orangery. Since 2005 the Roche Court Educational Trust, a charity, promotes appreciation of sculpture and other arts among young people through visits to the park and by outreach.

Kings Farm at West Winterslow is a largely complete example of a cruck-frame open-hall house, built in 1460 and later altered and extended. It was designated as Grade II* listed in 2022 after its age was established by tree-ring dating.

== Notable people ==
- John Roches (c.1333–1400), ambassador, MP and admiral, inherited a share in Winterslow manor through his mother.
- William Hazlitt (1778–1830), author and critic, wrote in a room at the Winterslow Hut; his wife Sarah owned a cottage at Middle Winterslow.
- Robert Thistlethwayte (1690–1744), disgraced academic.
- Peter Bellinger Brodie (1778–1854, conveyancer) and his brother Sir Benjamin Collins Brodie (1783–1862, pioneering physiologist and surgeon) were born here.
- Madeleine Ponsonby, Countess of Bessborough (1935–), art dealer, founder of New Art Centre, London, and Roche Court Sculpture Park and Gallery.

From at least 1955, Roche Court was the residence of Sir Geoffrey Ronald Codrington, a retired colonel in the Territorial Army. He was a Gentleman Usher to George VI and Elizabeth II, and High Sheriff of Wiltshire for 1955. A tablet in the church, commemorating refurbishment of the chancel in 1975, bears the names of Codrington and his wife.

== Amenities ==
Winterslow CE Primary School, Middle Winterslow, serves the parish and nearby villages. It was built as a National School in 1856 and educated children of all ages until 1962.

At Middle Winterslow is a large modern village hall with a tennis court. There is one pub: the Lord Nelson at Middle Winterslow. The Lion's Head at The Common closed in 2018. There is a convenience store near the Lord Nelson.

The Clarendon Way long-distance footpath passes through Middle Winterslow and West Winterslow; its route along the Roman road is shared with the Monarch's Way.

== Development controversy ==
A housing development at Middle Winterslow was proposed in 2011 and met with objections from some residents, leading to part of the site – the 7.5 acre Brown's Copse – gaining protection in 2015 through classification as a village green. A plan to build 46 houses was submitted in 2017 and withdrawn after meeting local opposition.
