= Peter Bellinger Brodie (conveyancer) =

English conveyancer (1778–1854)

Peter Bellinger Brodie (20 August 1778 – 8 September 1854) was an English conveyancer.

== Life ==
Brodie was born at Winterslow, Wiltshire, on 20 August 1778, being the eldest son of the Rev. Peter Bellinger Brodie, rector of Winterslow 1742-1804, who died 19 March 1804, by his marriage in 1775 with Sarah, third daughter of Benjamin Collins of Milford, Salisbury, who died 7 January 1847. He early chose law as a profession, but in consequence of an asthmatic complaint, he devoted himself to conveyancing, and became a pupil of Charles Butler. He was called to the bar at the Inner Temple on 5 May 1815.

His share of business placed him in a few years amongst the most eminent conveyancers of the time. One of the drafts by which he was earliest known was that of the Rock Life Assurance Company, 1806, a model for similar instruments, and only departed from where some variation was rendered necessary, as in the charter of King's College, London, which he also drew in 1829.

With the history of law amendment Brodie's name is intimately connected. He was one of the real property commissioners in 1828, and took a leading part. Their first report, which was made in May 1829, examined fines and recoveries; this part of the report was drawn up by Brodie, as was also the portion of the second report, June 1830, relating to the probate of wills, and the part of the third report, May 1832, relating to copyhold and ancient demesne. The fourth report was made in April 1833, and no part of this was prepared by him. Soon after the presentation of the first report it was determined to bring in bills founded upon its recommendations, and Brodie prepared that for abolishing fines and recoveries, which was brought in at the end of the session 1830, and became law in 1838. Lord St. Leonards, in his work on the 'Real Property Statutes,' praised the drafting of this act.

Brodie died at 49 Lincoln's Inn Fields, London, on 8 September 1854.

== Works ==
He was the author of a A Treatise on a Tax on Successions to Real as well as Personal Property, and the Removal of the House-tax, as Substitutes for the Income-tax, and on Burdens on Land and Restrictions on Commerce and Loans of Money, 1850.

== Family ==
He was twice married: first, on 16 March 1810, to Elizabeth Mary, daughter of Sutton Thomas Wood of Oxford—she died on 9 May 1825; secondly, on 1 June 1826, to Susan Mary, daughter of John Morgan. She died in London on 4 December 1870. Sir Benjamin Collins Brodie, 1st Baronet was his brother.
