= Madeleine Ponsonby, Countess of Bessborough =

British noblewoman and art dealer

Madeleine Ponsonby, Countess of Bessborough CBE
- Born: Madeleine Lola Margaret Grand; 8 November 1935 (age 89)
- Citizenship: British
- Occupation: Art dealer
- Years active: 1958–
- Known for: Founder of New Art Centre and Roche Court Sculpture Park and Gallery
- Spouse: Arthur Ponsonby, 11th Earl of Bessborough (m. 1963; died 2002)
- Children: 2

Madeleine Lola Margaret Ponsonby, Countess of Bessborough (née Grand; born 8 November 1935), is a British art dealer who married into the aristocratic Ponsonby family. She is the founder of New Art Centre, London, and Roche Court Sculpture Park and Gallery, Winterslow, Wiltshire.

== Personal life ==
Madeleine Lola Margaret Grand was born the only child of Maj. Gen. Laurence Douglas Grand and Irene Lola Hilda Mathew. About her parents, Bessborough remarked much later: "I was lucky in that I came from a family where we were told you could do anything. My father was a soldier and worked for the Secret Intelligence Service during the second world war, and my mother was one of the first women to go to Cambridge."

On 17 December 1963, she married Arthur Ponsonby, 11th Earl of Bessborough, as his third wife. Together they had two children.

== Career ==
In 1958, she was the founder of the New Art Centre in Sloane Street, London. In 1994, the gallery was relocated to Roche Court, East Winterslow, Wiltshire, and renamed New Art Centre Sculpture Park and Gallery. She is a trustee of the Roche Court Educational Trust, a charity that promotes appreciation of sculpture and other arts among young people through visits to the park and by outreach.

She was on the Council of the Royal College of Art from 1962 until 1973. She is also a lay canon of Salisbury Cathedral.

== Honours ==
Lady Bessborough was awarded an OBE in the 2010 New Year Honours ("for services to the Visual Arts"). She was awarded a CBE in the 2023 New Year Honours ("for services to Art Education and to Salisbury Cathedral"). On being awarded a CBE she commented: "It is wonderful, but it is not just for me. It is for all of us who work here. This is my life and I have been lucky to do something I love."

A portrait by photographer Anne-Katrin Purkiss is in the collection of the National Portrait Gallery, London.
