= Joana Vasconcelos =

Portuguese artist (born 1971)

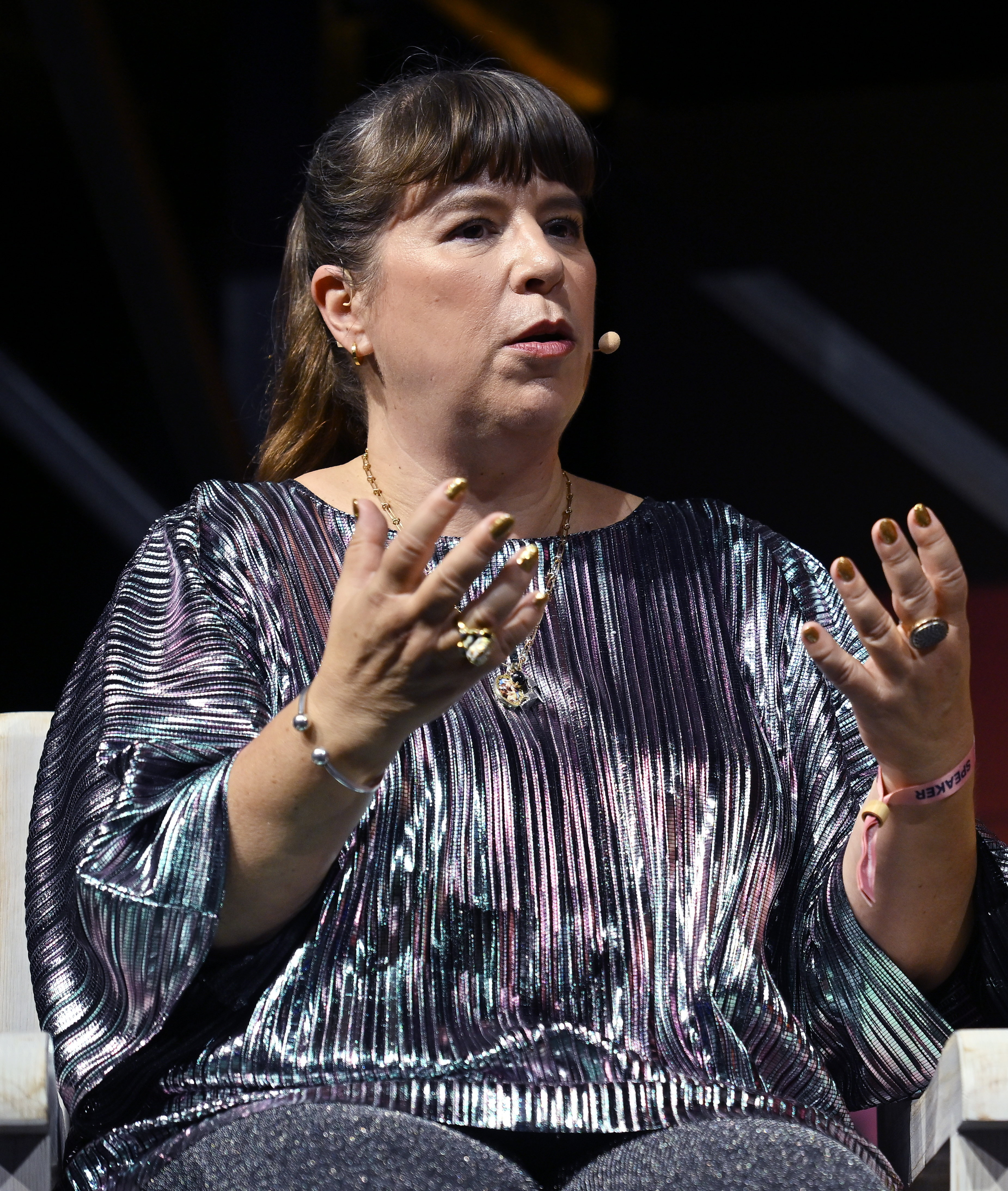
- Vasconcelos in 2023
- Born: 1971; Paris, France
- Known for: Sculpture, installation art
- Notable work: A Noiva (2001–2005); Trafaria Praia (2013); Pop Galo (2016); The Wedding Cake (2023)
- Awards: Order of Prince Henry (2009); Ordre des Arts et des Lettres (2022)
- Website: joanavasconcelos.com

Joana Vasconcelos (born 1971) is a Portuguese sculptor and installation artist known for large-scale works that recontextualise everyday objects and domestic craft techniques.

Vasconcelos works at monumental scale in hand-made crochet, embroidery and textiles, in hand-painted azulejo tiles, and in mass-produced domestic objects such as stainless-steel saucepans and plastic cutlery. Her sculptures and immersive environments address the status of women, consumer society, popular devotion and Portuguese national identity, frequently through humour and irony.

In 2012 Vasconcelos became the first woman and the youngest artist to be given a solo exhibition at the Palace of Versailles, and in 2013 she represented Portugal at the 55th Venice Biennale with Trafaria Praia, a converted Lisbon ferry that served as the country's first floating pavilion. Her 2018 retrospective I'm Your Mirror at the Guggenheim Museum Bilbao made her the first Portuguese artist to hold a solo exhibition at that museum, and she has since shown at the Uffizi, Waddesdon Manor and the Museo Picasso Málaga. She had first come to international attention at the 51st Venice Biennale in 2005 with A Noiva (The Bride), a chandelier whose crystal pendants are replaced by tampons.

Vasconcelos runs a large production studio in Lisbon and, since 2012, the Joana Vasconcelos Foundation. Her exhibitions are among the best attended given to a living Portuguese artist, and critical responses to the work have been divided.

== Early life and education ==
Vasconcelos was born in 1971 in Paris, France, where her parents were living in exile from the Estado Novo dictatorship. Following the Carnation Revolution of 1974, the family returned to Portugal, settling in Lisbon when she was about three years old.

She grew up in a family with artistic connections: her father, Luís Vasconcelos, was a photojournalist, her mother had studied decorative arts at the Ricardo do Espírito Santo Silva Foundation, her grandmother was a painter and an aunt was a poet. She attended the French lycée in Lisbon and later the Escola Artística António Arroio, and has practised karate since childhood.

Between 1989 and 1996 she trained at Ar.Co – Centro de Arte e Comunicação Visual in Lisbon, taking the basic drawing course (1989–1994), the basic jewellery course (1991–1995) and the advanced fine arts course (1994–1996); she also completed the first year of the design course at IADE in 1991–1992. Early in her career she worked at Galeria 111 in Lisbon, where she came into contact with artists including Júlio Pomar, Paula Rego and Graça Morais. She lives and works in Lisbon.

== Career ==
=== Early work and first recognition ===
Vasconcelos began exhibiting in the mid-1990s. Early works such as Flores do Meu Desejo (1996), Sofá Aspirina (1997), Cama Valium (1998), Loft (1996–2010) and www.fatimashop (2002), a Piaggio delivery van converted into a mobile shop selling illuminated statues of Our Lady of Fátima, established the strategies she would continue to use: the appropriation of mass-produced domestic and devotional objects, and their enlargement or accumulation into sculpture. She won the EDP New Artists Prize in 2000 and the Tabaqueira Public Art Prize in 2003, the latter for a project for the Largo da Academia das Belas-Artes in Lisbon.

=== International breakthrough (2005–2011) ===
Vasconcelos exhibited at the 51st Venice Biennale in 2005, in the Arsenale exhibition Always a Little Further curated by Rosa Martínez, where she showed A Noiva (The Bride), a chandelier some 6 metres (20 ft) high whose crystal pendants are replaced by tampons. (Note: Sources differ on the number of tampons used. The artist's studio gives a figure of about 14,000, while the National Museum of Women in the Arts states 25,000.) The work, hung near pieces by the Guerrilla Girls, brought her international attention, though it also drew criticism for what one reviewer called a crude equation of the work with female-coded materials.

She took part in the Echigo-Tsumari Triennale in Japan in 2006, showed Contaminação at the Pinacoteca do Estado de São Paulo in 2008, and appeared in the group exhibition Un Certain État du Monde? at the Garage Center for Contemporary Culture in Moscow in 2009. In 2010 a major solo show, I Will Survive, was held at Haunch of Venison, 6 Burlington Gardens, London, from 21 July to 25 September 2010, and the survey Sem Rede (Netless) opened at the Museu Colecção Berardo in Lisbon. In June 2011 her textile installation Contaminação (Contamination, 2008–2010) opened the group exhibition The World Belongs to You at Palazzo Grassi in Venice; the work is held in the Pinault Collection.

=== Versailles and the Portuguese Pavilion (2012–2013) ===
Work by Vasconcelos installed at Versailles, 2012

In 2012 Vasconcelos showed at the Palace of Versailles in the palace's annual contemporary art exhibition, following Jeff Koons, Takashi Murakami, Xavier Veilhan, Bernar Venet and Lee Ufan. She was the first woman and the youngest artist to be given the exhibition. Curated by Jean-François Chougnet and running from 19 June to 30 September 2012, the exhibition placed works through the state apartments and gardens, among them Marilyn in the Hall of Mirrors, Perruque in the Queen's Bedchamber, Lilicoptère, a Bell 47 helicopter clad in ostrich feathers, gold leaf and Swarovski crystals, and three Valkyrie textile sculptures in the Galerie des Batailles. The exhibition was reported to have drawn about 1.6 million visitors; citing Le Figaro, the Portuguese American Journal described it as the most visited art exhibition in the Paris region in 50 years.

Shortly before the exhibition opened, A Noiva was excluded from it by Catherine Pégard, president of the Public Establishment of the Palace, Museum and National Estate of Versailles, who cited the work's absence from the original plan, the diversity of the palace's international audience and the view that "the château is not a gallery". Vasconcelos responded that the tampon remained "an object forbidden by society"; the work was shown instead at Le Centquatre in Paris later that year.

Trafaria Praia, the converted ferry that served as the Portuguese pavilion at the 55th Venice Biennale, 2013

In 2013 Vasconcelos represented Portugal at the 55th Venice Biennale with Trafaria Praia, curated by Miguel Amado and open from 1 June to 24 November 2013. A decommissioned Lisbon cacilheiro ferry was converted into the national pavilion, making it the Biennale's first floating pavilion: the hull carries a 60-metre (200 ft) hand-painted azulejo panel produced by Viúva Lamego showing a contemporary panorama of Lisbon, while the interior holds a blue crochet-and-light environment, Valkyrie Azulejo. The same year she showed at the Ajuda National Palace in Lisbon, from 23 March to 25 August.

=== Museum exhibitions (2014–2020) ===
Time Machine at Manchester Art Gallery (2014) was followed by a series of institutional shows in Europe and Asia, including Textures of Life at ARoS Aarhus Kunstmuseum (2016–2017), for which she made Valkyrie Rán, now in the museum's collection.

The Guggenheim Museum Bilbao during I'm Your Mirror, 2018

In 2018 she presented the retrospective I'm Your Mirror at the Guggenheim Museum Bilbao (29 June to 11 November 2018), curated by Enrique Juncosa and Petra Joos, becoming the first Portuguese artist to hold a solo exhibition there. The show gathered about 30 works from 1997 onwards and included Egeria, a site-specific Valkyrie suspended in the museum's atrium. The exhibition travelled to the Serralves Museum of Contemporary Art in Porto (19 February to 24 June 2019), where it drew close to 600,000 visitors, and to the Kunsthal Rotterdam (20 July to 17 November 2019). Maximal, her first solo museum exhibition in Germany, was held at the Max Ernst Museum in Brühl in 2019.

In 2020 Vasconcelos created a site-specific work, Valkyrie Mumbet, for the opening of the MassArt Art Museum in Boston on 22 February 2020. It was her first solo museum exhibition in the United States. The work belongs to the Valkyries series of large-scale suspended pieces made for particular spaces in homage to women associated with them; it honours Elizabeth "Mumbet" Freeman, an enslaved woman whose successful 1781 freedom suit contributed to the end of slavery in Massachusetts.

Her largest British exhibition to that date, Beyond, ran at the Yorkshire Sculpture Park from 7 March 2020 to 10 January 2021, in the Underground Gallery and outdoors.

=== Recent work (2021–present) ===
In 2023 Vasconcelos exhibited at the Uffizi Galleries and Palazzo Pitti in Florence with Between Sky and Heart (4 October 2023 to 14 January 2024), curated by Eike Schmidt and Demetrio Paparoni, placing Royal Valkyrie in the Uffizi's Tribuna and Marilyn in the Sala Bianca of Palazzo Pitti.

Solitário nº1 shown at MAAT, Lisbon

The same year she showed Plug-in at the Museum of Art, Architecture and Technology (MAAT) in Lisbon, curated by João Pinharanda; the exhibition had received more than 260,000 visits by late March 2024.

Her first solo exhibition in China, Through Mountains and Seas, opened at Tang Contemporary Art in Beijing in 2023 and brought together more than 30 works.

Also in 2023 she completed, after five years of work, The Wedding Cake, a three-tier ceramic sculptural pavilion 12 metres (39 ft) high and about 11 metres (36 ft) in diameter, commissioned by the Rothschild Foundation for the grounds of Waddesdon Manor in England. It was her fourth work for the estate, after Lafite (2015).

In 2024 the newly opened Malta International Contemporary Art Space (MICAS) in Floriana inaugurated its programme with her solo exhibition Transcending the Domestic (27 October 2024 to 17 April 2025), which brought together Valkyrie Mumbet (2020), The Garden of Eden and the towering Tree of Life (2023). In the same period she staged Le Château des Valkyries at Schloss Gottorf and the Eisenkunstguss Museum in Germany (1 May to 3 November 2024).

In 2025 she presented Flamboyant at the Liria Palace in Madrid (opened 14 February 2025), her first intervention in an inhabited historic palace, and Flowers of My Desire at the Museo Comunale d'Arte Moderna in Ascona, her first public exhibition in Switzerland, curated by Mara Folini and Alberto Fiz. In the same year she became the first Portuguese artist to design a label for Château Mouton Rothschild, contributing the work Paraíso for the estate's 2023 vintage.

In January 2026 the Fondazione Valentino Garavani e Giancarlo Giammetti opened Venus: Valentino Garavani through the Eyes of Joana Vasconcelos at Palazzo Mignanelli in Rome, with accompanying installations in public spaces including Solitaire on the Terrazza del Pincio. Transfiguration, a survey of works from the late 1990s onwards curated by Miguel López-Remiro Forcada, opened at the Museo Picasso Málaga on 29 May 2026.

== Work ==
=== Themes and methods ===
Vasconcelos's work characteristically takes an object associated with domestic labour, popular devotion or mass consumption and changes its scale, quantity or context: saucepans become stiletto heels, plastic cutlery becomes a filigree heart, drying racks and steam irons become kinetic sculpture. Craft techniques traditionally coded as feminine, among them crochet, embroidery, lacework and the painting of azulejos, are used at architectural scale, a strategy critics have read as an attempt to monumentalise and revalue women's work. The work has been related to the readymade, nouveau réalisme and pop art. Portuguese vernacular sources recur throughout: the Rooster of Barcelos, the Viana heart, the azulejo, the varina fishwife, the Nazaré skirt and the iconography of Fátima.

Many works are made with, or sponsored by, Portuguese manufacturers and international brands, among them the tile factory Viúva Lamego, the cookware maker Silampos, the porcelain company Vista Alegre and the fashion houses Dior and Marina Rinaldi.

=== Valkyries ===
Begun in 2004, the Valkyries are the best-known body of her work: suspended, tentacular textile sculptures of hand-made crochet, felt appliqué, fabric, ornaments and LEDs, usually made for a specific building and named after a woman connected with it or with the commissioning institution. Examples include Royal Valkyrie and Golden Valkyrie (both 2012, Versailles), Valkyrie Rán (2016, ARoS Aarhus), Egeria (2018, Guggenheim Bilbao), Simone (2019, after Simone de Beauvoir and Simone Veil), Valkyrie Mumbet (2020, Boston) and Valkyrie Miss Dior (2023, made from Dior fabrics for the house's autumn/winter show in the Tuileries Garden).

=== Selected works ===
Suspensão at the Sanctuary of Fátima, 2017

- A Noiva (The Bride, 2001–2005) – a chandelier 6 metres (20 ft) high made from OB tampons on a stainless-steel armature; first shown at the 2005 Venice Biennale and later held in the António Cachola Collection at the Museu de Arte Contemporânea de Elvas.
- Burka (2002) – a motorised stack of layered garments, referencing the "seven skirts" of Nazaré beneath a burqa, that rises and falls on a stage.
- Coração Independente Vermelho (Red Independent Heart, 2005) – a rotating Viana heart built from translucent red plastic cutlery, turning to recordings of Amália Rodrigues; in the collection of the Museu Colecção Berardo.
- Marilyn (2009 and 2011) – a pair of monumental stiletto shoes built from stainless-steel saucepans and lids, produced with Silampos; part of the Shoes series.
- Lilicoptère (2012) – a Bell 47 helicopter covered in ostrich feathers, gold leaf and Swarovski crystals, with an interior of gilt leather and Arraiolos carpets, made for Versailles with the Ricardo do Espírito Santo Silva Foundation.
- Pop Galo (2016) – a 9-metre (30 ft) Barcelos rooster clad in hand-painted Viúva Lamego tiles and fitted with thousands of LEDs and a sound work made with Jonas Runa; shown in Lisbon, Beijing, Bilbao, Barcelos and at the Yorkshire Sculpture Park.
- Suspensão (2017) – a 26-metre (85 ft) luminous rosary suspended above the entrance to the Basilica of the Holy Trinity at the Sanctuary of Fátima, commissioned for the centenary of the apparitions and first lit for Pope Francis's visit on 12 May 2017.
- Solitaire (2018) – a 7-metre (23 ft) engagement ring made of gold-coloured car wheel rims topped by an inverted pyramid of crystal whisky glasses.
- Gateway (2019) – a working outdoor swimming pool lined with more than 11,000 hand-painted tiles at Jupiter Artland, near Edinburgh.
- Árvore da Vida (Tree of Life, 2023) – a 13-metre (43 ft) crochet-and-embroidery tree made for the Sainte-Chapelle of the Château de Vincennes, assembled from more than 100,000 hand-stitched fabric elements, many of them cut from material already in the studio and sewn during the COVID-19 lockdowns. (Note: Counts vary between sources. The Art Newspaper reports 110,000 hand-stitched pieces, while the artist's studio gives about 140,000 leaves across 354 branches.)
- The Wedding Cake (2023) – a walk-in three-tier ceramic pavilion at Waddesdon Manor, clad in pastel tiles produced by Viúva Lamego.

=== Public works ===
Vasconcelos has made permanent and semi-permanent works for public settings in Portugal and abroad, including A Jóia do Tejo at the Belém Tower in Lisbon (2008), Varina on the Dom Luís I Bridge in Porto (2008), Jardim Bordallo Pinheiro at the Museu da Cidade garden in Lisbon (2009), Portugal a Banhos at the Doca de Santo Amaro in Lisbon (2010), Sr. Vinho at the municipal market of Torres Vedras (2010), La Théière at Le Royal Monceau in Paris (2010), the Pavillon de Thé at the Cafesjian Center for the Arts in Yerevan (2012), a tiled panel at Largo do Moinho de Vento in Porto (2017), Suspensão at Fátima (2017), Néctar at the Buddha Eden garden in Bombarral, Cœur de Paris on the T3 tramway at Porte de Clignancourt in Paris, and a work for the Ferber station on the Nice tramway. In 2026 Solitaire was installed permanently at the Estádio da Tapadinha in Lisbon, alongside works by Vhils and Bela Silva, in a partnership between MAAT, Atlético Clube de Portugal and the EDP Foundation.

== Atelier and foundation ==
Vasconcelos established her studio, Atelier Joana Vasconcelos, in 2006; it occupies premises in the Doca de Alcântara in Lisbon and employs around 50 people across production, architecture, communication and administration, together with a workshop of seamstresses and crocheters. The studio is not generally open to the public. Much of the crochet and embroidery in her work is produced by artisans in Portuguese towns with textile traditions, notably Nisa.

In 2012 she created the Fundação Joana Vasconcelos, a non-profit foundation that awards study grants in the arts, preserves her archive and works, supports social causes and promotes access to art.

== Reception ==
Vasconcelos's exhibitions are among the most widely attended given to a living Portuguese artist. Her Versailles show drew about 1.6 million visitors, the Serralves presentation of I'm Your Mirror close to 600,000, and Plug-in at MAAT more than 260,000.

Reviewers have often responded warmly to the ambition and craft of individual pieces. Writing in Apollo about Time Machine in Manchester, Emma Crichton-Miller described Full Steam Ahead as a "dream-like transformation of a dull symbol of domestic servitude into a sheerly beautiful, hugely expensive, functionless artwork". Anna Souter, reviewing Beyond for Hyperallergic, read the work as a "feminist attempt to monumentalize and liberate the traditionally domestic or feminine task of sewing". Giulia Lamoni, writing for the AWARE Women Artists database, places the practice within a sustained engagement with craft traditions coded as feminine and with Portuguese popular imagery.

Critical writing has also been sceptical. Reviewing the Serralves show for The Quietus, Bárbara Borges de Campos argued that the recent work followed a repeatable formula and objected to the corporate sponsorship attached to individual pieces.

== Awards and honours ==
- 2000 – EDP New Artists Prize, EDP Foundation, Lisbon
- 2003 – Tabaqueira Public Art Prize, for a project for the Largo da Academia das Belas-Artes, Lisbon
- 2006 – "The Winner Takes it All", Berardo Foundation, Lisbon, for Néctar
- 2009 – Commander of the Order of Prince Henry, conferred by the President of Portugal on 10 June
- 2013 – Contemporary Art Prize, Association Française des Amis du Musée d'Art de Tel Aviv
- 2014 – Mulheres Criadoras de Cultura distinction in visual arts, awarded by the Portuguese government
- 2022 – Officer of the Ordre des Arts et des Lettres, France

== Collections ==
Vasconcelos's work is held by institutions including the National Museum of Women in the Arts in Washington, D.C.; the Centre Pompidou in Paris, which holds Mise (2000); the Museu Colecção Berardo and the EDP Foundation collection in Lisbon; the Museu de Arte Contemporânea de Elvas; ARoS Aarhus Kunstmuseum; the Pinault Collection; the Fondation Louis Vuitton; Waddesdon, the Rothschild Collection; the Amorepacific Museum of Art in Seoul; and Manchester Art Gallery.

== Solo exhibitions (selection) ==
- 2026: Transfiguration, Museo Picasso Málaga, Málaga, Spain
- 2026: Venus: Valentino Garavani through the Eyes of Joana Vasconcelos, Palazzo Mignanelli, Rome, Italy
- 2025: Flowers of My Desire, Museo Comunale d'Arte Moderna, Ascona, Switzerland
- 2025: Flamboyant, Liria Palace, Madrid, Spain
- 2024–25: Transcending the Domestic, MICAS, Floriana, Malta
- 2024: Le Château des Valkyries, Schloss Gottorf and Eisenkunstguss Museum, Germany
- 2023–24: Between Sky and Heart, Gallerie degli Uffizi and Palazzo Pitti, Florence, Italy
- 2023–24: Plug-in, Museum of Art, Architecture and Technology (MAAT), Lisbon, Portugal
- 2023: Through Mountains and Seas, Tang Contemporary Art, Beijing, China
- 2020–21: Beyond, Yorkshire Sculpture Park, West Bretton, United Kingdom
- 2020: Valkyrie Mumbet, MassArt Art Museum, Massachusetts College of Art and Design, Boston, United States
- 2019: Maximal, Max Ernst Museum, Brühl, Germany
- 2018–19: I'm Your Mirror, Guggenheim Museum Bilbao, Bilbao, Spain; travelling to Serralves, Porto, and Kunsthal Rotterdam
- 2016–17: Textures of Life, ARoS Aarhus Kunstmuseum, Aarhus, Denmark
- 2014: Time Machine, Manchester Art Gallery, Manchester, United Kingdom
- 2013: Joana Vasconcelos, Ajuda National Palace, Lisbon, Portugal
- 2013: Trafaria Praia, Portuguese Pavilion, 55th Venice Biennale, Venice, Italy
- 2012: Joana Vasconcelos Versailles, Château de Versailles, France
- 2010: I Will Survive, Haunch of Venison, London, United Kingdom
- 2010: Sem Rede (Netless), Museu Colecção Berardo, Lisbon, Portugal
- 2008: Contaminação, Projeto Octógono, Pinacoteca do Estado de São Paulo, São Paulo, Brazil

== Group exhibitions (selection) ==
- 2025: Énormément Bizarre, Centre Pompidou, Paris, France
- 2018: Summer Exhibition, Royal Academy of Arts, London, United Kingdom
- 2011: The World Belongs to You, Palazzo Grassi, Venice, Italy
- 2011: Res Publica, Centenário da República, Calouste Gulbenkian Foundation, Lisbon, Portugal
- 2009: Un Certain État du Monde?, Garage Center for Contemporary Culture, Moscow, Russia
- 2006: Echigo-Tsumari Triennale, Tokamachi, Japan
- 2005: Always a Little Further, 51st Venice Biennale, Venice, Italy

== Gallery ==
Lilicoptère (2012), a Bell 47 helicopter clad in ostrich feathers, gold leaf and crystals

Call Center (2014–16), a pistol built from more than a hundred rotary-dial telephones

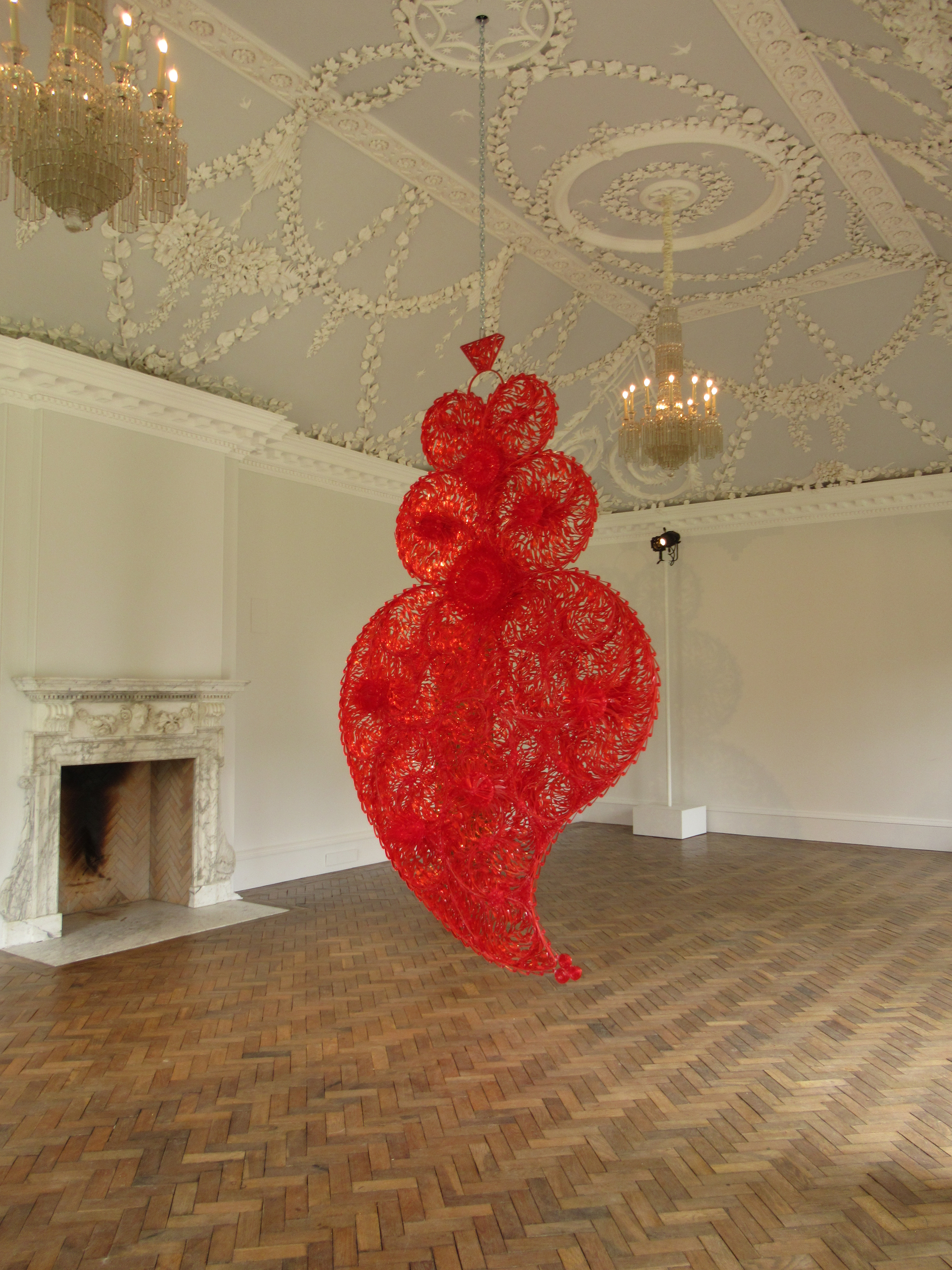
Coração Independente Vermelho (2005), built from red plastic cutlery

Marilyn, a stiletto shoe built from stainless-steel saucepans and lids

Tutti Frutti at the Yorkshire Sculpture Park

I'll be Your Mirror at the Yorkshire Sculpture Park

Installation view, La Patinoire Royale, Brussels, 2016

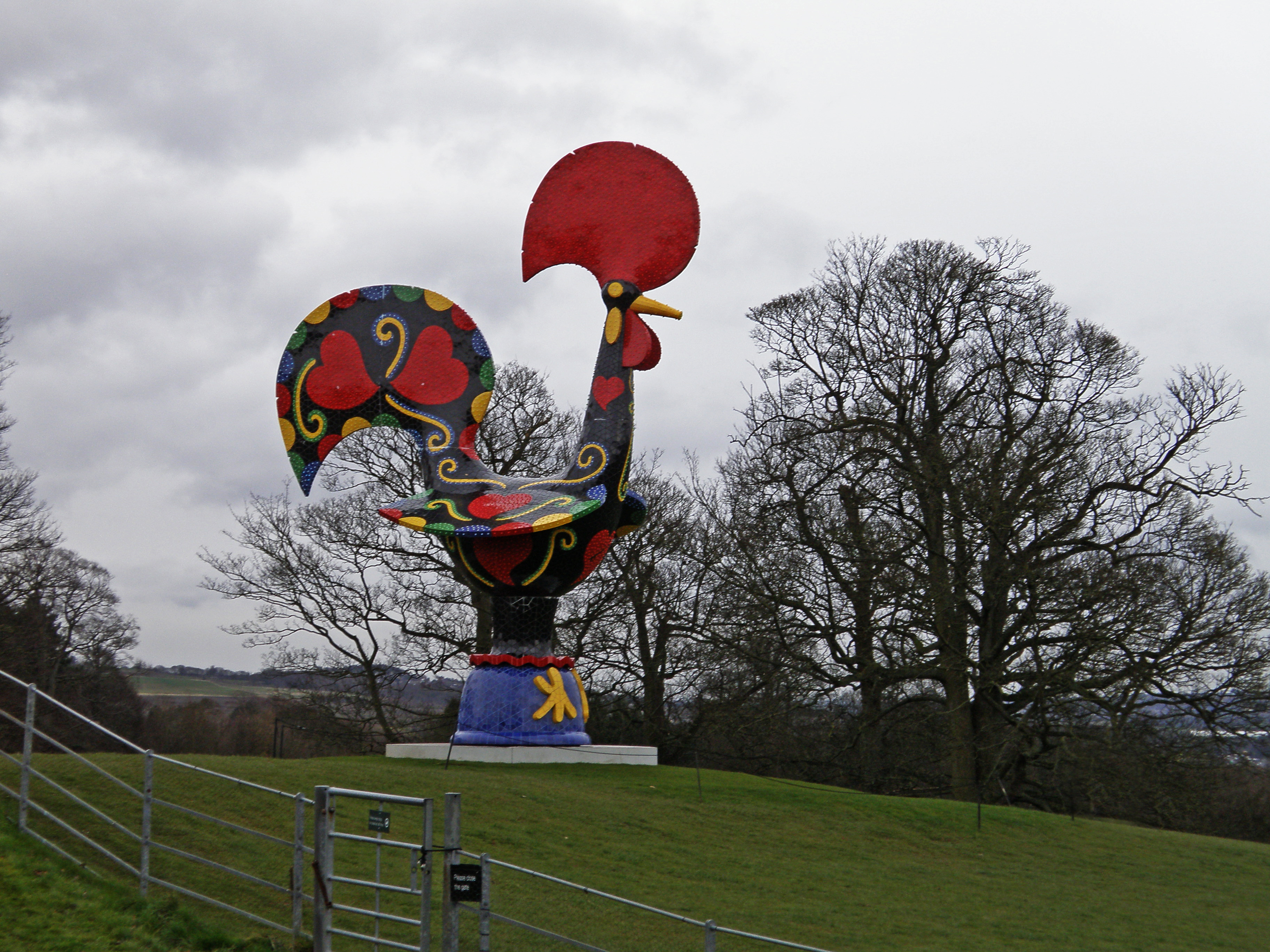
Pop Galo (2016) at the Yorkshire Sculpture Park

Gateway (2019), a tiled swimming pool at Jupiter Artland
