= The Wedding Cake (sculpture) =

Sculptural pavilion by Joana Vasconcelos (2023)

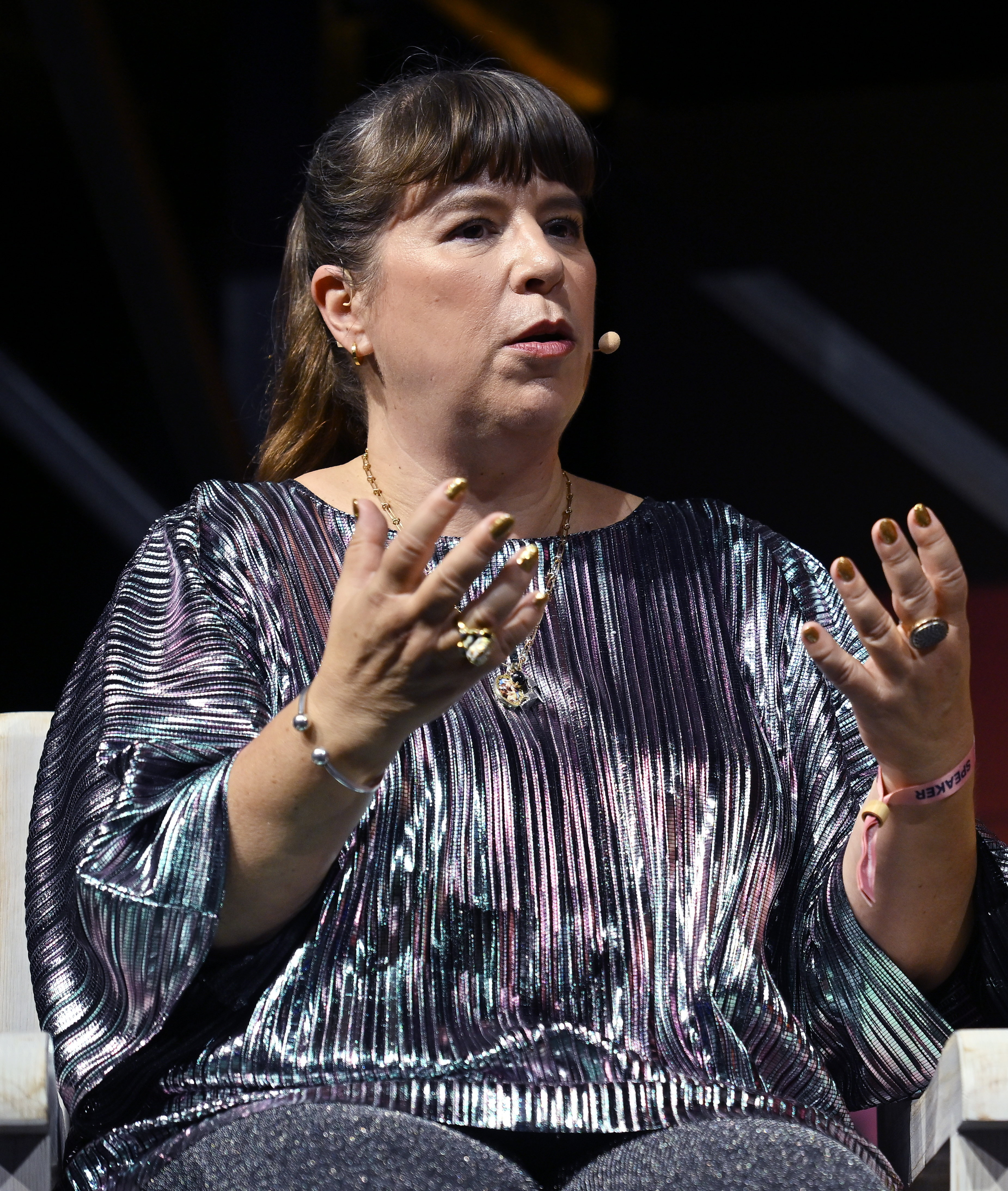
The artist in November 2023

The Wedding Cake is a ceramic sculptural pavilion that visitors can step inside. Designed by the Portuguese installation artist, Joana Vasconcelos and opened in 2023, it was commissioned by the Rothschild Foundation and is situated in the gardens of Waddesdon Manor in England.

== Background ==
The Wedding Cake stemmed from the long-standing relationship between the art collector Lord Rothschild (1936–2024) and Vasconcelos. It was the fourth project by Vasconcelos to be exhibited in the grounds of the manor, which was built in the 1870s by Baron Ferdinand de Rothschild. Since 1957, the property has been owned by the National Trust, and managed for the trust by the Rothschild Foundation.

The Waddesdon manor house, near Aylesbury in Buckinghamshire, is a French-style chateau on a hill-top summit surrounded by woods. It was built to house Ferdinand de Rothchild's art collection and to host weekend parties. Royalty were frequent guests. The work by Vasconcelos, described by her as her most ambitious to date, is 12 metres tall and took five years to complete. Nearby is another of her installations, Lafite, in which two giant candlesticks are constructed from emptied magnums of Château Lafite Rothschild, an expensive Bordeaux Wine. The structure also complements other fanciful buildings in the manor's grounds, such as the ornamental dairy, built in 1885 for the dairy herd and used subsequently for parties, the flint house and the aviary.

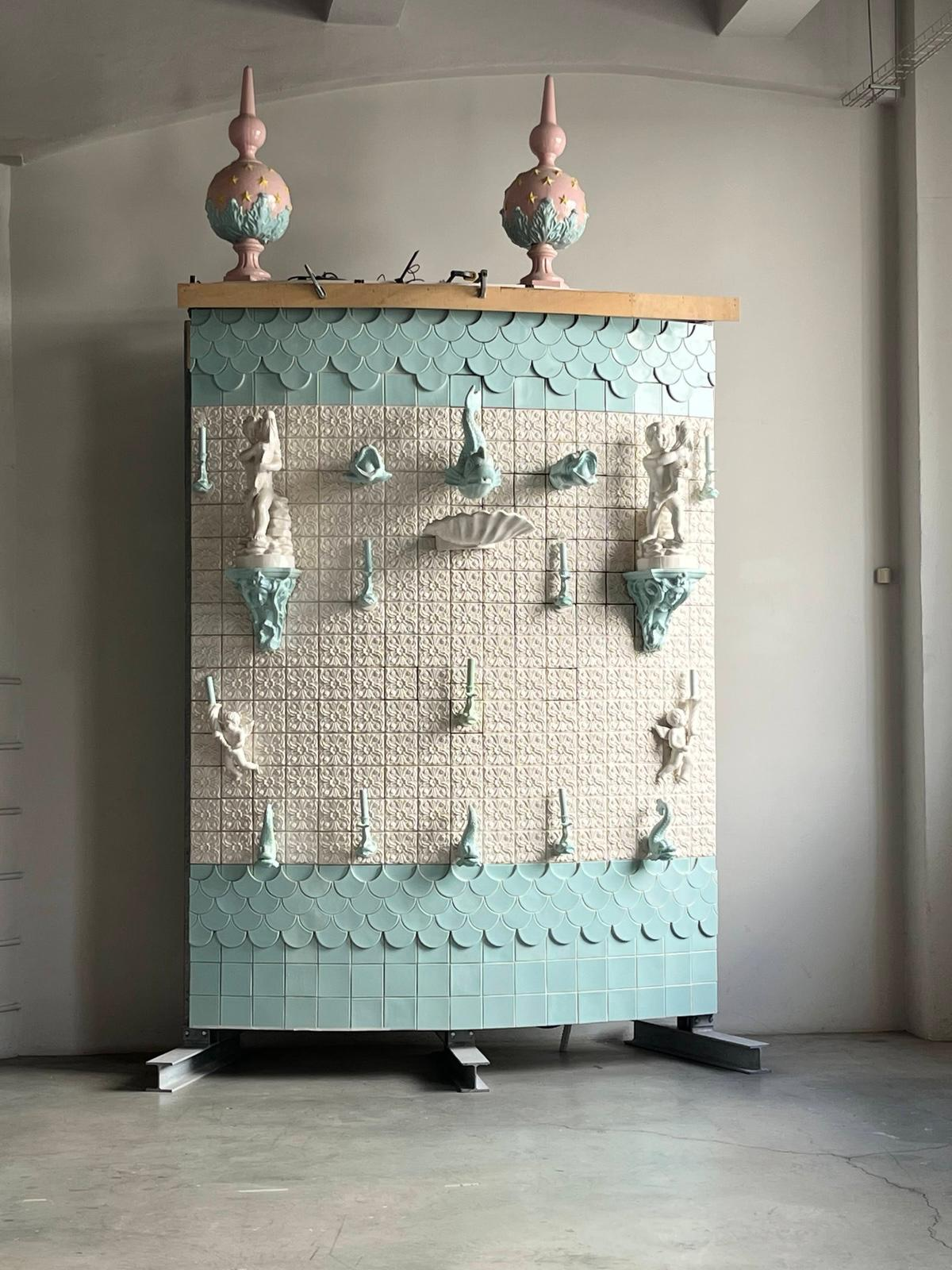
Ornaments and tiles used in the Joana Vasconcelos sculpture, The Wedding Cake, on display at her atelier in Lisbon

== Description and construction ==
Inspired by 18th-century garden pavilion design, the work can be seen as part sculpture and part architectural folly. It has also been described as a "temple to love" and continues the interest in this topic by Vasconcelos since her 2005 work, The Bride, was shown at the Venice Biennale and her enormous engagement ring, Solitaire, made using car wheel rims and glass whisky tumblers, was shown at the Guggenheim Museum Bilbao in 2018. Designed to look like a three-tiered cake, it is entirely covered with highly glazed, light pink, green and blue tiles made to appear to be like icing, supplied by the Fábrica de Cerâmica da Viúva Lamego in Sintra, Portugal, and is also adorned with various ceramic ornaments, using designs produced by that factory since its foundation in 1849. These were chosen to complement the architecture of the manor and the collections of ceramics it houses, and provide what has been called "an abundance of detail". Viúva Lamego's standard 14 x 14cm tiles determined the size of the overall structure, with its 11-metre diameter being the smallest circle that could be made using whole tiles.

The interior, which is lit by electric candles and ceramic mermaids, has a domed circular wedding chapel with more ceramics and the sound of trickling water. The domed ceiling is designed to give the illusion that you are looking at the sky. Weddings can be held there. It is possible to climb the stairs to the second and third tiers of the "cake", with an open-air roof area. The sculpture's apex fits just two people, the bridal couple, in imitation of the models often placed on top of wedding cakes. The Wedding Cake was largely constructed in the workshop of Vasconcelos in the Alcântara parish of Lisbon and assembled in Waddesdon. It required 3500 wrought-iron parts, 21.815kg of iron sheeting, and around 21,150 tiles of 99 different types, as well as 1,238 ornaments.
