= A Line Made by Walking =

Artwork by Richard Long

A Line Made by Walking is a 1967 sculpture by British artist Richard Long. The piece was made when Long walked a continuous line into a field of grass in Wiltshire, England, and then photographed the result. The work is considered to be an important early work in the history of both land art and conceptual art. It has been described as among Long's signature works, and as his "best-known early piece".

== History ==
A Line Made by Walking was made in 1967 when Long was a 22-year-old art student at Saint Martin's School of Art, London. At the time, Long commuted regularly between his home in Bristol and the school, a journey of around 120 miles. Stopping in Wiltshire, he found a grassy area and walked a straight path in it repeatedly until a line was visible. He then took a black and white photograph of the result.

The work was considered innovative at the time as it proposed that the simple act of walking could be an art form, and that art could be produced by the foot as well as the hand. The piece also questioned whether the performance – or the document of the performance – was the actual artwork. As such it presented a challenge to what was traditionally understood to be as sculpture. The work, which set the tone for Long's career as an artist, was one of his earliest pieces and his first walking-based piece. In the context of Long's career, A Line Made by Walking manifested the artist's fascination with trails and traces as mapped histories, a very prevalent theme in his work.

A Line Made by Walking established Long as a minimalist and conceptual sculptor; it was also an early example of land art. Long created several pieces which hark back to the 1967 original including circles or organic paths, some in snow, dust, or even charred grass. These include Walking a Line in Peru (1972), a narrow path walked across a wide plain, leading to the foothills of distant mountains; A Line and Tracks in Bolivia (1981), approximately 150 feet long with accompanying tracks intersecting; Sea Level Waterline in Death Valley, California (1982), a path walked at the zero foot contour, representing sea level in low-lying Death Valley; and A Line in Nepal (1983), a forest path approximately 50 feet long.

== Collections ==
The work is held in the collections of the Tate Museum, London, the Courtald Gallery, the Getty Museum and the National Galleries of Scotland. It has also been on display in the Solomon R. Guggenheim Museum in New York, as part of a major exhibition of Long's work held by that museum in the 1970s and 1980s.

The 2017 novel, A Line Made by Walking, by Sara Baume, is named for the artwork.
