= John Virtue =

English artist (born 1947)

- Born: 1947 (age 78–79); Accrington, Lancashire
- Education: Slade School of Fine Art
- Known for: Painting

John Virtue (born 1947), is an English artist who specialises in monochrome landscapes. He is honorary Professor of Fine Art at the University of Plymouth, and from 2003 to 2005 was the sixth Associate Artist at London's National Gallery.

== Biography ==
Virtue was born in Accrington, Lancashire in 1947. He trained at the Slade School of Fine Art in London from 1965 to 1969. In 1971 he moved to Green Haworth, near Oswaldtwistle, painting landscapes for two years before abandoning painting in favour of pen and ink drawings comprising dense networks of lines akin to the work of Samuel Palmer.

From 1978 Virtue worked as a postman, giving this up in 1985 to work as a full-time artist. He lived in Devon from 1988 to 2004. Maintaining a studio in Exeter, he produced works around the Exe estuary, before being offered the post of Associate Artist at the National Gallery. This scheme engages contemporary artists to produce work that "connects to the National Gallery Collection" and demonstrates "the continuing inspiration of the Old Master tradition".

== Work ==
Virtue uses only black and white on his work as he sees colour as "unnecessary distraction". He uses shellac black ink and white paint.

He is well known for his "London Paintings" which were displayed in The National Gallery and focused on the London skyline, using easily distinguishable landmarks from the capital such as the Gherkin, the NatWest Tower and St. Paul's Cathedral, to familiarise his audience with the otherwise hazy, smoggy and ambiguous drawings.

Virtue's awards include: first prize in the Sunday Mirror painting competition (1964), Walter Neurath prize for painting awarded by Thames & Hudson Publishers (1966), Arts Council Major Award (1981), Joint First prize-winner in the 4th Tolly Cobbold Exhibition (1983), and Best Visual Artist in the South Bank Awards (2006).

His work during his National Gallery tenure was exhibited in 2005 at the National Gallery and at Courtauld Institute of Art, and his final, large-scale, London works were exhibited at the University of Plymouth in 2007. He moved to Italy to work and returned in 2009 to live in North Norfolk. where he has continued to produce work, for example, 'The Sea' exhibitions The Tate in London holds examples of his work.
