= Joseph Dirand =

French architect and interior designer

Joseph Dirand (born 26 March 1974) is a French architect and interior designer based in Paris.

== Biography ==
Dirand was born in Paris; his father, Jacques Dirand, was a photographer specialising in interiors and his mother was a fashion designer. He studied architecture at the École Nationale Supérieure d'Architecture de Paris-Belleville. As of April 2014 he lived in his own restored flat in the 7th arrondissement with his partner and their two daughters from previous marriages.

== Career ==
Dirand works in Paris. After receiving the commission while still a student to do the interior design for Junko Shimada's Paris shop, he started his own interior design firm in 1999, when he was 25, and drew public attention with his redesign of a flat facing the Place de la Concorde. After his creation of the new shop for Balmain on rue François-Ier, which has been called "the most beautiful fashion store in Paris", he came to be in demand as an interior architect for fashion companies.

Bespoke furniture by Dirand was included in the inaugural AD Collections exhibition in 2015. Later that year he held his first exhibition of his furniture, which is manufactured by craftsmen at the Ateliers Saint-Jacques and which he describes as a homage to modernist architects who are "heroes" to him, such as Carlo Scarpa, Alvar Aalto, Pierre Jeanneret and Le Corbusier.

=== Selected projects ===
- Shop interiors for Balmain (Paris), Rick Owens (London), Balenciaga (Paris), Givenchy (Paris), Chloé (Paris and Shanghai), Pucci (New York), Alexander Wang (Beijing)
- Flat overlooking Place de la Concorde, Paris
- Restaurants Le Flandrin (Paris), Le Grand Café (Paris, in the Grand Palais), Monsieur Bleu (Paris, in the Palais de Tokyo), Loulou (Paris)
- Hotels Hábitat (Monterrey), Distrito Capital de Mexico (Mexico City), L’Apogée (Courchevel, with India Mahdavi, Surf Club, Miami Beach, with Richard Meier

== Aesthetic ==
Dirand's style is minimalist, often monochromatic; in his early work he largely used black and white. He emphasises strong lines, classic elements, lighting, rich materials, particularly marble, and the telling detail that brings an interior to life; however, he says that he designs "spaces that are alive" rather than "locations of contemplation". His later designs characteristically use slabs of marble. In designing for retailers, he seeks to understand and reflect the "story" of the brand based on key images, typically 20 from an initial portfolio of hundreds.

== Awards ==
- 2010: Wallpaper Design Award for the best hotel (Hábitat, Monterrey)
- 2013: Interior designer of the year, Maison & Objet
- 2014: Wallpaper Design Award for the best new restaurant (Monsieur Bleu, Paris)
