= Christina Seilern =

Swiss-Austrian architect

- Education: Columbia University
- Alma mater: Wellesley College
- Occupation: Architect
- Years active: 1997 - present
- Organisation: Studio Seilern
- Awards: RIBA International House of the Year Award 2013; World Architecture Festival 2012
- Website: www.studioseilern.com

Christina Seilern is a Swiss-Austrian architect. She won the 2013 Royal Institute of British Architects (RIBA) International Prize for architecture and the 2013 RIBA International Award for House of the Year. She established London-based Studio Seilern Architects (SSA) in 2006.

== Early life ==
Seilern attended school in Switzerland. She studied architecture at the Wellesley College as an undergraduate and attended Columbia University for her master's degree graduating in 1996.

Seilern began working for Rafael Viñoly at Rafael Viñoly Architects in 1997. According to an interview:

"During my studies at Columbia I went to a lecture held by [architect] Rafael Vinaly. Although it was the period when deconstruction was fashionable, he talked about the Tokyo forum and in particular about one detail. I was struck by his love of craftsmanship. I worked for him in New York. A few years later I went to see him to tell him that I was going to leave my job because I wanted to move to London. Rafael’s reaction was: “let’s set up an office in London”.

== Career ==
Seilern is the founder and lead architect at Studio Seilern Architects, established in 2006, in London. Seilern claims that the buildings of Louis Khan and Eero Saarinen inspired her work.

=== G.W. Annenberg Performing Arts Centre ===
Seilern designed the G. W. Annenberg Performing Arts Centre at Wellington College in Berkshire. Seilern's design placed a circular base at the foot of the auditorium so that the venue appears to emerge from the campus' woodland. Seilern claims Greek amphitheatres inspired the main auditorium's circular shape. Seilern clad the venue's exterior with charred timber using the shou sugi ban technique.

The centre won the 2018 World Architecture Festival award for Best Building in Education and RIBA shortlisted the building for their 2019 South Award.

=== The ski resort in Andermatt ===
Samih Sawiris commissioned Seilern's studio to design Andermatt Concert Hall and two restaurants. The concert hall was the first development stage in the Swiss cultural complex.

The venue seats a maximum of six hundred and fifty people and can accommodate a philharmonic orchestra. The conductor Constantinos Carydis led a performance by the Berlin Philharmonic during the venue's opening evening. The Daily Telegraph claims that the concert hall is the first purpose-built auditorium in any Alpine ski resort.

Seilern's firm built two of the resort's restaurants on Mount Gütsch, approximately 2,340 metres (7,680 ft) above sea level. Seilern's design featured a concrete foundation supporting a glued laminated timber structure. Seilern designed the restaurants to resemble Swiss Alpine settlements.

=== Other work ===
Seilern and architect Muzia Sforza designed the Gota Dam residence in 2012 in Zimbabwe. The 1500 square metre residential property sits on top of a large rock in Zimbabwe. The project won the 2013 RIBA International Award for House of the Year. In an interview, Seilern states that this first project, "will always hold a special place in my heart."

Seilern's company designed Andsell Street, a commercial development in Kensington, London. RIBA shortlisted the project for their 2017 RIBA London Regional Award.
