= Bela Silva =

Portuguese visual artist and ceramist

- Bela Silva in 2025
- Born: 1966 (age 59–60); Lisbon, Portugal
- Education: Escola Superior de Belas-Artes; Norwich School of Fine Arts; School of the Art Institute of Chicago
- Known for: Ceramics, sculpture, drawing, textile design
- Movement: Contemporary art, ceramic art
- Website: www.belasilva.com

Bela Silva (born 1966) is a Portuguese visual artist working in ceramics, sculpture, drawing, and textile design. Her work includes hand-built ceramic sculptures, tile installations, and textile designs.

Silva's work has been exhibited internationally at venues including the Niterói Contemporary Art Museum (Brazil), Casa-Atelier Vieira da Silva (Lisbon), Musée des Arts Décoratifs (Paris), and Galerie du Passage (Paris). She has collaborated with Hermès, Tiffany & Co., Ginori 1735, and Monoprix. Her work has appeared at PAD London, Art Brussels, and Design Miami.

== Early life and education ==
The Art Institute of Chicago, USA

Bela Silva was born in Lisbon, Portugal, in 1966. She studied at the Escola Superior de Belas-Artes in Porto and Lisbon, where she received training in sculpture and ceramics. She attended Ar.Co (Centro de Arte e Comunicação Visual) in Lisbon.

Silva continued her education at the Norwich School of Fine Arts in the United Kingdom. She subsequently completed a Master of Arts degree at the School of the Art Institute of Chicago in 1994.

== Career ==
=== Public commissions and collaborations (2010–present) ===
Private house installation, 2021

In 2018, Silva became the first Portuguese artist to design a silk scarf for Hermès. The scarf, titled "La Maison des oiseaux parleurs" (The House of Talking Birds), features bird motifs incorporated into patterns and flowers.

Silva has collaborated with Monoprix (2020, 2023) on homeware collections, and with Tiffany & Co. (2022–present) on limited-edition ceramic pieces. In 2021, she launched a hand-painted porcelain collection in partnership with Ginori 1735, presented in Paris.

Silva has created public art commissions including ceramic tile panels for the Alvalade Station of the Lisbon Metro (2015), panels for the gardens of the Sakai Cultural Center in Japan (2016), and panels for the João de Deus school in the Azores (2017).

Exhibition "Caminho Tropical", 2024

In 2024, Silva held a solo exhibition, Caminho Tropical, at the Museu de Arte Contemporânea de Niterói in Brazil, which included tile panels, ceramic sculptures, and drawings. The exhibition resulted in a permanent tile installation at Parque Orla Piratininga Alfredo Sirkis in Rio de Janeiro.

In 2022, her work was presented at Villa Tamaris in La Seyne-sur-Mer as part of the Crossed Season France–Portugal. In 2023, she exhibited in South Korea and at the Palácio Cadaval in Portugal.

=== Multidisciplinary practice (1995–2010) ===
Bela Silva at Design Miami; Jardim Botânico exhibit, 2024

From the mid-1990s, Silva expanded into textile and surface design, applying ceramic motifs to silk and linen. She participated in group exhibitions across Europe and North America, including Art Brussels and Design Miami.

Her work was exhibited at the Musée des Arts Décoratifs in Paris, the Museum of the Orient in Lisbon, and the National Museum of Ancient Art in Lisbon.

=== Early career (1980s–1995) ===
Bela Silva painting, 1980s

Silva began her professional career in the late 1980s, producing ceramics, sculptural works, and drawings. Her first solo exhibition, A bela e os monstros, was held at the National Centre of Culture in Lisbon in 1992. In 1994, she exhibited at the Ann Nathan Gallery in Chicago.

While studying at the Art Institute of Chicago in 1993, Silva rediscovered the azulejo tradition, influenced by a professor.

== Exhibitions ==
Silva's work has been featured in solo and group exhibitions internationally since 1992.

=== Selected solo exhibitions ===
- 2024: Caminho Tropical, Museu de Arte Contemporânea de Niterói, Brazil
- 2023–2024: Da Vista um Rio, Casa-Atelier Vieira da Silva, Lisbon
- 2021: Jardim Botânico, Spazio Nobile, Brussels
- 2021: Art Reborn Project, Galerie du Passage, Paris
- 2008: O Armário dos Celadons, Casa-Museu Anastácio Gonçalves, Lisbon
- 2007: Um olhar sobre o palácio, National Palace of Ajuda, Lisbon
- 1994: Ann Nathan Gallery, Chicago
- 1992: A bela e os monstros, National Centre of Culture, Lisbon

=== Selected group exhibitions ===
- 2024: Design Miami/Paris, France
- 2023: Palácio Cadaval, Évora, Portugal
- 2023: South Korea
- 2022: Villa Tamaris, La Seyne-sur-Mer, France (Crossed Season France–Portugal)
- 2019–2023: PAD London, United Kingdom (multiple editions)
- 2018–2024: Design Miami/Paris, France (multiple editions)
- 2015–2023: Art Brussels, Belgium
- 2016–2022: Collectible Art Fair, Brussels, Belgium

=== Major group exhibitions (museum and institutional) ===
- 2025–2026: "O Azulejo em Portugal. Uma História em Aberto", Museu Nacional do Azulejo, Lisbon, Portugal
- 2024: "Caminho Tropical" (solo), Museu de Arte Contemporânea de Niterói, Brazil
- 2023: Palácio Cadaval, Évora, Portugal
- 2018–2023: Galerie du Passage, Paris, France (multiple exhibitions)
- 2017: Biennale Interieur, Kortrijk, Belgium
- 2017–2019: Rencontres d'Arles, France
- 2015: Alvalade Metro Station (permanent public installation), Lisbon, Portugal

== Collections ==
Silva's work is held in public and private collections across Europe, North America, and Asia.Her pieces have been featured in major international auctions, including Sotheby's Contemporary Decorative Arts sales.

=== Public collections ===
- Istituto Statale d'Arte per la Ceramica, Teramo, Italy
- John Michael Kohler Arts Center, Kohler, Wisconsin, United States
- John Michael Kohler Foundation, Kohler, United States
- Marshall Fields, Chicago, United States
- Clube Português de Artes e Ideias, Lisbon, Portugal
- Museu Nacional do Azulejo (National Azulejo Museum), Lisbon, Portugal
- Banco Montepio Geral, Lisbon, Portugal
- Museum of Contemporary Art, Niterói, Brazil
- National Museum of Ancient Art, Lisbon, Portugal
- Museum of the Orient, Lisbon, Portugal
- Musée des Arts Décoratifs, Paris, France

=== Permanent public installations ===
- 2024: Parque Orla Piratininga Alfredo Sirkis (POP), Rio de Janeiro, Brazil (tile installation following Caminho Tropical exhibition)
- 2017: João de Deus school, Azores, Portugal (ceramic tile panels)
- 2016: Sakai Cultural Center gardens, Sakai, Japan (ceramic panels)
- 2015: Alvalade Metro Station, Lisbon, Portugal (ceramic tile panels)

=== Museum acquisitions ===
Silva's work has been acquired by the Museu Nacional do Azulejo in Lisbon, including a tile panel from her 1999 solo exhibition "Bela Silva: antes do mar, as águas", produced by Fábrica Viúva Lamego, donated by the artist in 2000. Her work was included in the museum's survey exhibition "O Azulejo em Portugal. Uma História em Aberto" (2025–2026), which traveled to Tavira, Portugal.

In 2024, the Museu de Arte Contemporânea de Niterói in Brazil hosted her solo exhibition Caminho Tropical, after which a permanent tile installation was placed in Parque Orla Piratininga Alfredo Sirkis.

=== Auction history ===
Silva's ceramic works have appeared at Sotheby's Contemporary Decorative Arts auctions, among other international sales rooms.

=== Private collections ===
Silva's work is held in private collections throughout Europe, North America, and Asia, including commissions for residential villas designed by Jacques Grange in Portugal.

In 2024, Silva completed a permanent tile installation at Parque Orla Piratininga Alfredo Sirkis in Rio de Janeiro following her solo exhibition at the Museu de Arte Contemporânea de Niterói. She continues to exhibit internationally, with presentations at Design Miami/Paris in 2024 and ongoing collaborations with Tiffany & Co. and Ginori 1735.
