= Maison et Objet =

French trade fair for interior design

Maison et Objet (Maison&Object) is a major French trade fair for interior design. Held bi-annually in Paris Nord Villepinte Exhibition Center, it has been described as "among the 3 most important European events for interior design ... a huge collection of innovation and talent all in one place."

== Maison et Objet in Beijing ==
"M&O Design Pavilion at WF CENTRAL" was a collaboration between Maison et Objet and WF Central, a luxury retail mall in Wangfujing, Beijing. The exhibition lasted from 16 September to 18 November 2018. The special exhibition, which marks the initial entry of M&O to the China consumer market, followed the theme LOVE DESIGN and feature over 30 selected brands and six M&O Designers of the Year.

== Designer of the Year ==
Every year the fair bestows a designer or multiple designers with its "Designer of the Year Award". The honorees as of present have been:

- 2012 – Tokujin Yoshioka
- 2013 – Edward Barber and Jay Osgerby, Odile Decq and Joseph Dirand
- 2014 – Dimore Studio, Tom Dixon, and Phillip Nigro
- 2015 – Dorothée Meilichzon and Nendo (Sato Oki)
- 2016 – Ilse Crawford and Eugeni Quillet
- 2017 – Tristan Auer, Pierre Charpin, and WOHA AND Rising Asian Talents
- 2018 – Cecilie Manz; Ramy Fischler
- 2019 – Sebastian Herkner
- 2023 – Raphael Navot
