= Richard Long (artist) =

British visual artist (born 1945)

Sir Richard Long CBE RA
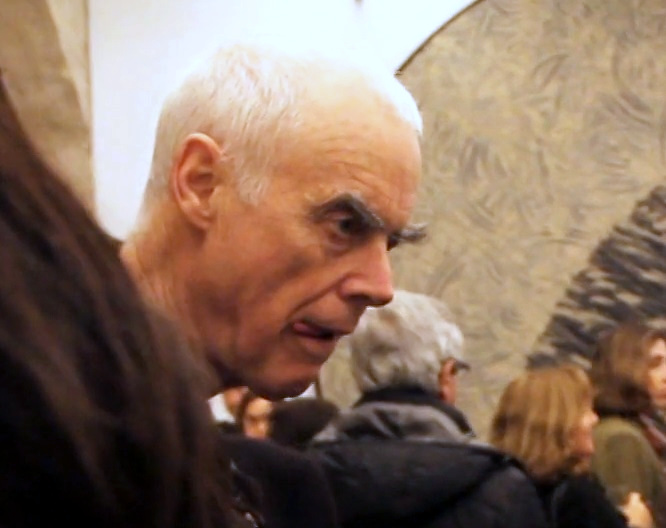
- Richard Long, March 11, 2015
- Born: Richard Julian Long; 2 June 1945 (age 81); Bristol, England
- Education: Saint Martin's School of Art
- Known for: Sculpture, painting, photography
- Movement: Land Art
- Awards: Turner Prize (1989); Praemium Imperiale (2009)
- Website: www.richardlong.org

Sir Richard Julian Long (born 2 June 1945) is an English sculptor, painter, photographer, and one of the best-known British land artists.

Long is the only artist to have been short-listed four times for the Turner Prize. He was nominated in 1984, 1987 and 1988, and then won the award in 1989 for White Water Line. He lives and works in Bristol, the city in which he was born.

Long studied at Saint Martin's School of Art before going on to create work using various media including sculpture, photography and text. His work is on permanent display in Britain at the Tate and Bristol City Museum and Art Gallery as well as galleries in America, Switzerland and Australia.

Long's work has broadened the idea of sculpture to be a part of performance art and conceptual art. His work typically is made of earth, rock, mud, stone and other nature based materials. In exhibitions his work is typically displayed with the materials or through documentary photographs of his performances and experiences.

== Early life and education ==
Long was born in Bristol, in south-west England. Between 1962 and 1965 he studied at the West of England College of Art, and then, from 1966 to 1968, at Saint Martin's School of Art in London, where he studied under Anthony Caro and Phillip King and became closely associated with fellow student Hamish Fulton.

== Work ==
Several of his works were based around walks that he has made, and as well as land based natural sculpture, he uses the mediums of photography, text and maps of the landscape he has walked over. Long has been taking these walks since the mid 1960s where he has walked in places such as the Sahara Desert, Australia, Iceland and near his home in Bristol, United Kingdom. His work has proven to be revolutionary as it has changed how society views sculpture. His work has influenced the boundaries of sculpture to not be limited to only "traditional" materials and to be able to use alternative materials in his work. Not only is he using alternative materials such as rock and earth, but he also changed what art is, as the actual art piece can be the process of creating the art itself.

In his work, often cited as a response to the environments he walked in, the landscape would be deliberately changed in some way, as in A Line Made by Walking (1967), and sometimes sculptures were made in the landscape from rocks or similar found materials and then photographed. Other pieces consist of photographs or maps of unaltered landscapes accompanied by texts detailing the location and time of the walk it indicates.

His piece Delabole Slate Circle, acquired from the Tate Modern in 1997, is a central piece in Bristol City Museum and Art Gallery. The piece is nearly 2 metres in diameter and is composed of 168 pieces of slate that came from the Delabole quarry in Cornwall, United Kingdom. The piece can be configured differently, however Long has specified a few rules on how it should be put together. All pieces of stone must touch so that they can be locked together and stable, as well as the pieces must form a circle. The connection of the slates and the geometric shape illustrates a common theme that Long portrays in his work about the relationship between man and nature. Long explains, "you could say that my work is ... a balance between the patterns of nature and formalism of human, abstract ideas of lines and circles. It is where my human characteristics meet the natural forces and patterns of the world, and that is really the kind of subject of my work."

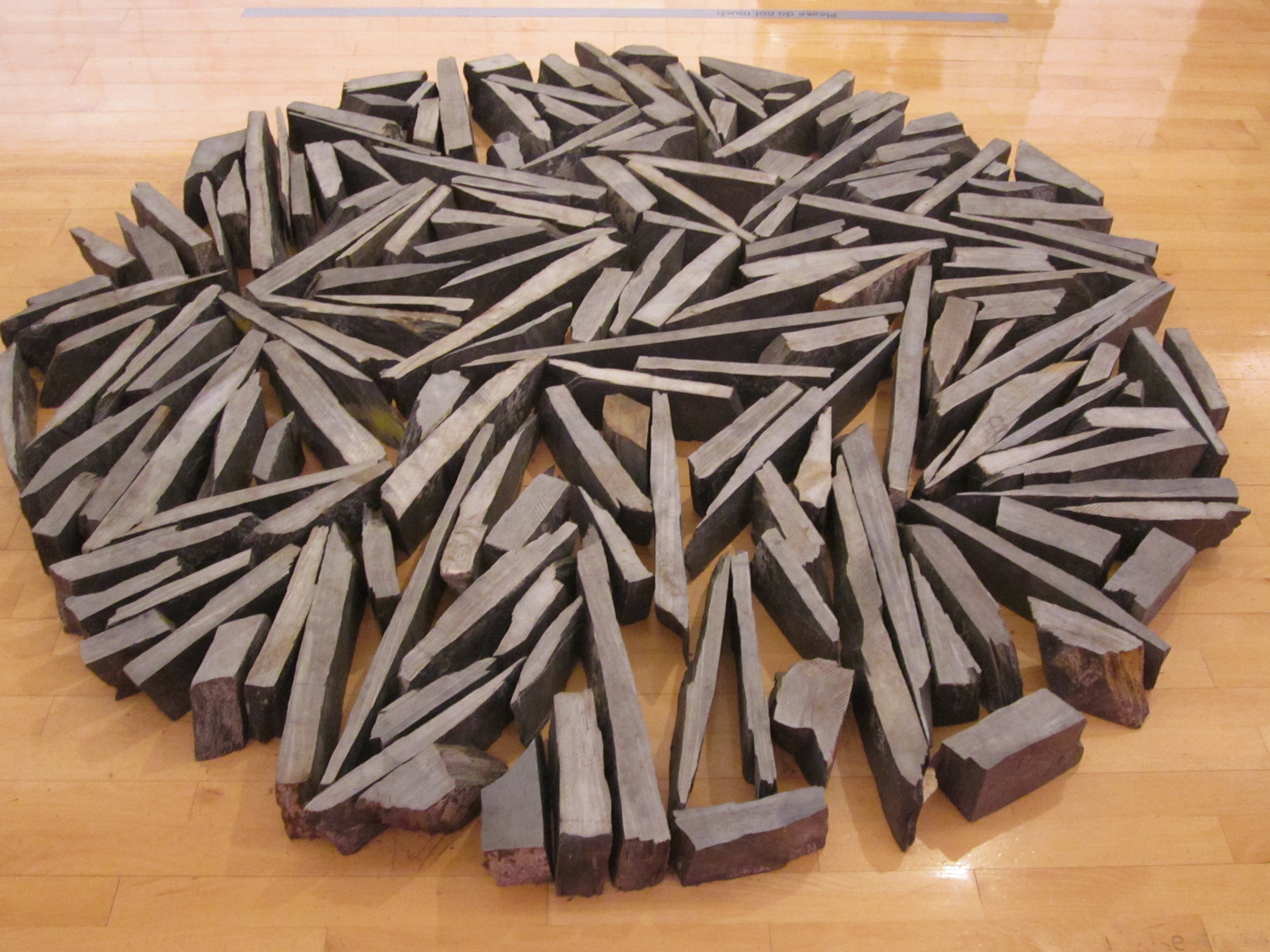
South Bank Circle by Richard Long, Tate Liverpool, England. (1991)

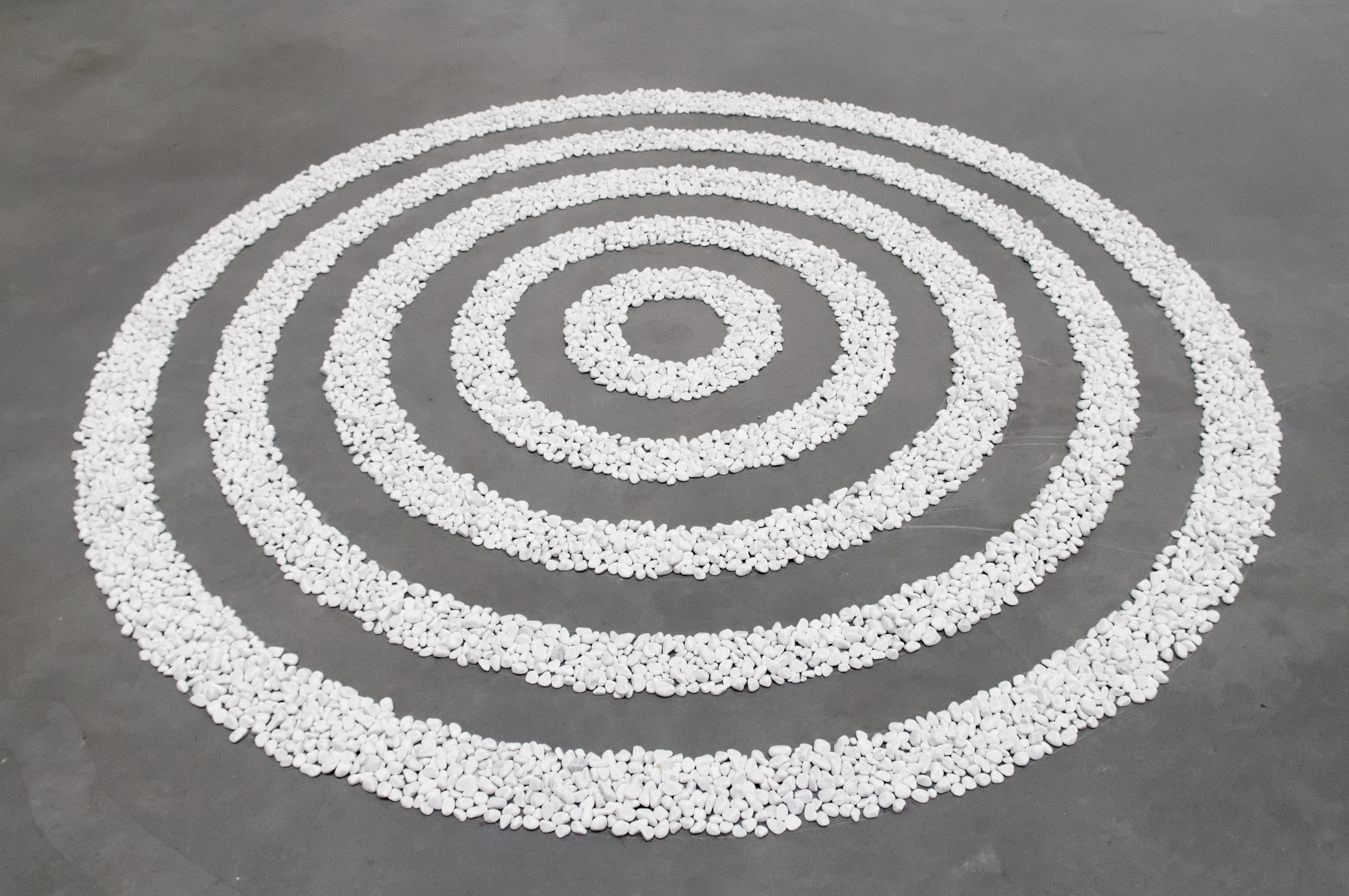
Small White Pebble Circles, Tate Modern, London (1987)

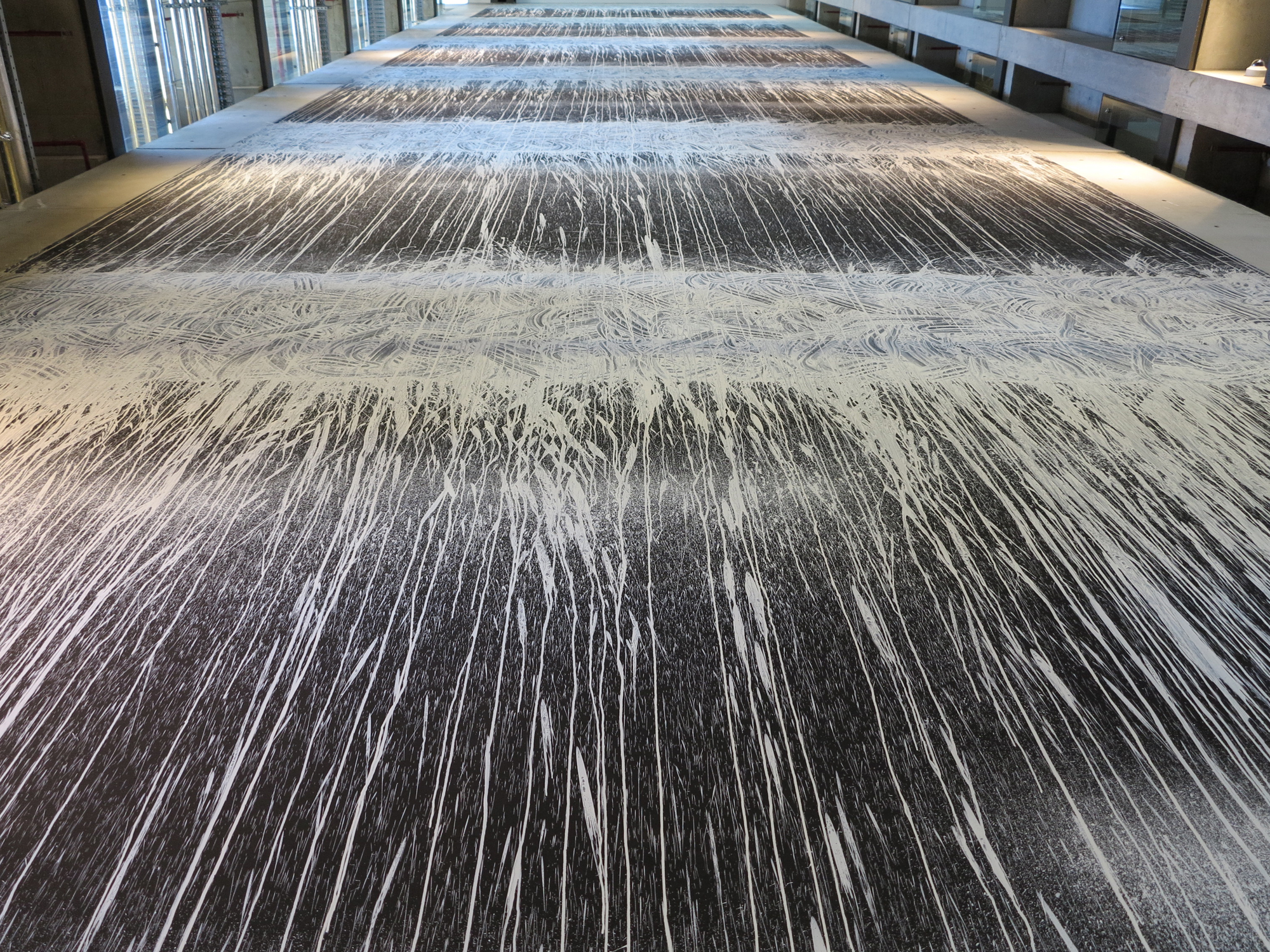
White Water Falls, Garvan Institute, Sydney (2012)

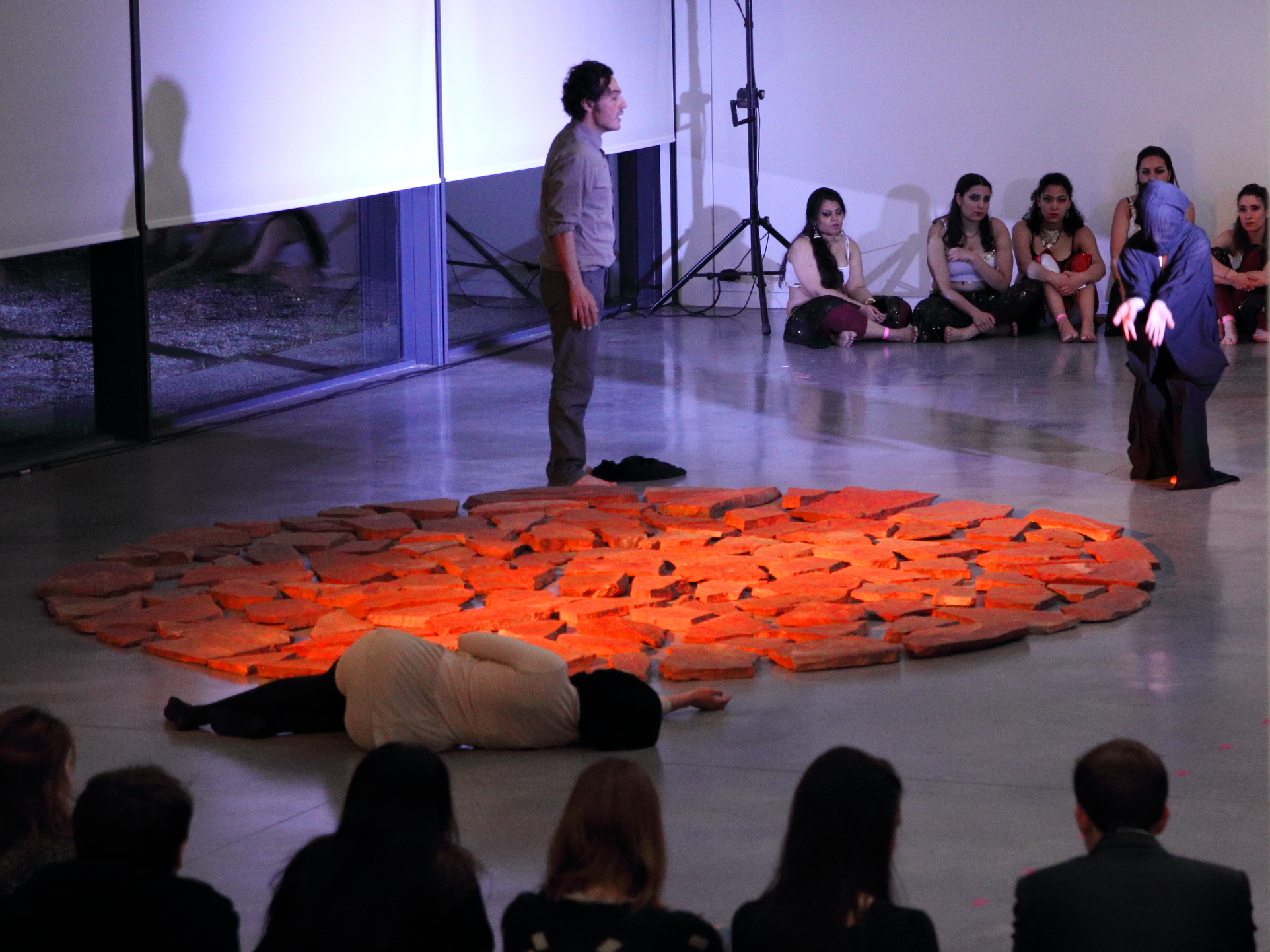
Brittany red stone circle, Museum of Grenoble (1978)

At Houghton Hall in Norfolk, the Marquess of Cholmondeley commissioned a sculpture to the east of the house. Long's land art there consists of a circle of Cornish slate at the end of a path mown through the grass. The New Art Centre in Salisbury is home to Long's Tame Buzzard Line (2001), a line of flint stones made to mimic the journey of a buzzard between an oak and an ash tree in the centre's grounds.

Permanent installations include Riverlines (2006) at the Hearst Tower in New York, US (at about 35 x 50 feet (11 x 15 metres) this was at the time the biggest wall work he had ever made); Planet Circle (1991) at the Museum de Pont, Tilburg, Netherlands; and White Water Falls (2012) in the Garvan Institute in Sydney, Australia.

In 2009, a retrospective of Long's work entitled "Heaven and Earth," appeared at the Tate Britain. In 2015, a major solo exhibition Richard Long: Time and Space, at the Arnolfini, celebrated his work in his hometown of Bristol.

== Walked-line pieces ==
Long has created several pieces which hearken back to the original 1967 piece A Line Made by Walking. Some are circles or organic paths. Some exist in snow, dust, and even charred grass.

Walked path sculptures by Richard Long
Title	Location	Date	Description	Source
Walking a Line in Peru	Peru	1972	narrow path walked across a wide plain, leading to the foothills of distant mountains	
A Line and Tracks in Bolivia	Bolivia	1981	approximately 150 feet long with	
Sea Level Waterline	Death Valley, California, US	1982	path walked at the zero foot contour, representing sea level in low-lying Death Valley	
A Line in Nepal	Nepal	1983	forest path approximately 50 feet long	
Grass Circle- Ring of verde di Prato stone	Italy	1985	The artist worked inside and outside to create two complementary installations	
Walking a Circle in Mist	Scotland	1986	circular path approximately 75 feet in diameter; outside of path fades outward creating a corona-like effect	
Dusty Boots Line	The Sahara	1988	approximately 200 feet long; light dust is revealed underneath the dark surface rocks of the Sahara	
Whirlwind	The Sahara	1988	spiral path approximately 75 feet in diameter emanating from a single central point	
Mahalakshmi Hill Line	Maharashtra, India	2003	organically curving path approximately 100 feet long; chaff is moved to reveal dark, underlying earth	
A Walking and Running Circle	Maharashtra, India	2003	circular path approximately 15 feet across; created after controlled grass burn; Long walked the path; local children later ran on the same path	
Midday Muezzin Line	Siwa, Egypt	2006	approximately 200 feet long, one side of the path is stark while the other feathers out to the side	
Tigerline	Switzerland	2010	approximately 300 feet long, follows an existing footpath, a narrow central line is walked to reveal dark stone under snow	

== Books ==
- Nile (Papers of River Muds). Los Angeles: Lapis Press, 1990.
- South America. Brest: Zédélé éditions, 2012. (Düsseldorf: Konrad Fischer, 1972 [1st ed.]).
- Clarrie Wallis' 2009 book, Richard Long: Heaven and Earth was published as a companion to an exhibit of his photographs at the Tate Gallery, London.

== Selected honours and awards ==
- 1976 Represented Britain in the British Pavilion at the Venice Biennale, Venice, Italy
- 1989 Turner Prize, Tate Gallery, London, UK
- 1990 Chevalier de l’Ordre des Arts et des Lettres, French Ministry of Culture, Paris, France
- 2001 Elected to the Royal Academy of Arts
- 2009 Awarded the Praemium Imperiale for sculpture from Japan
- 2015 Named Whitechapel Gallery Art Icon
- 2023 Wolf Prize in Arts

Long was appointed a Commander of the Order of the British Empire (CBE) in the 2013 New Year Honours and a Knight Bachelor in the 2018 New Year Honours for services to art.

== Art market ==
Long's Whitechapel Slate Circle (1981) brought a record price for the artist in 1989 when it sold for $209,000 at Sotheby's in New York. At another auction in 1992, the piece was estimated far more modestly at $120,000 to $160,000, but bidding never exceeded $110,000; instead, the National Gallery of Art, Washington, D.C. purchased it in 1994 through dealer Anthony d'Offay.

== See also ==
- Land art
- Environmental art
- Environmental sculpture
