= India Mahdavi =

Iranian-French architect and designer (born 1962)

India Mahdavi (born 1962) is an Iranian-French architect and designer with projects such as Luma and Hotel Le Cloître in Arles, the Villa Medici in Rome, and the Condesa DF hotel in México City. She is known for her use of color, and she was awarded with Officier status in the Order des Arts et des Lettres.

== Early life and education ==
India Mahdavi was born in 1962 in Tehran. Her father was Iranian and her mother was Scottish-Egyptian, and she was one of five siblings. Her family lived in Cambridge, Massachusetts from 1964 to 1968. They then moved to Heidelburg, Germany and then Nice and Vence in France.

She studied architecture at École des Beaux Arts in Paris, France, from 1980 to 1986, eventually moving to New York, where she studied furniture design at Parsons School of Design and graphic design at the School of Visual Arts.

== Design career ==
After her studies, Mahdavi returned to France to work as the artistic director of Christian Liagre for seven years. She left in 1997, freelanced for two years, and then started her own studio called imh interiors in 1999. She is headquartered in Paris in three buildings along the Rue Las Cases.

=== Hotels & restaurants ===
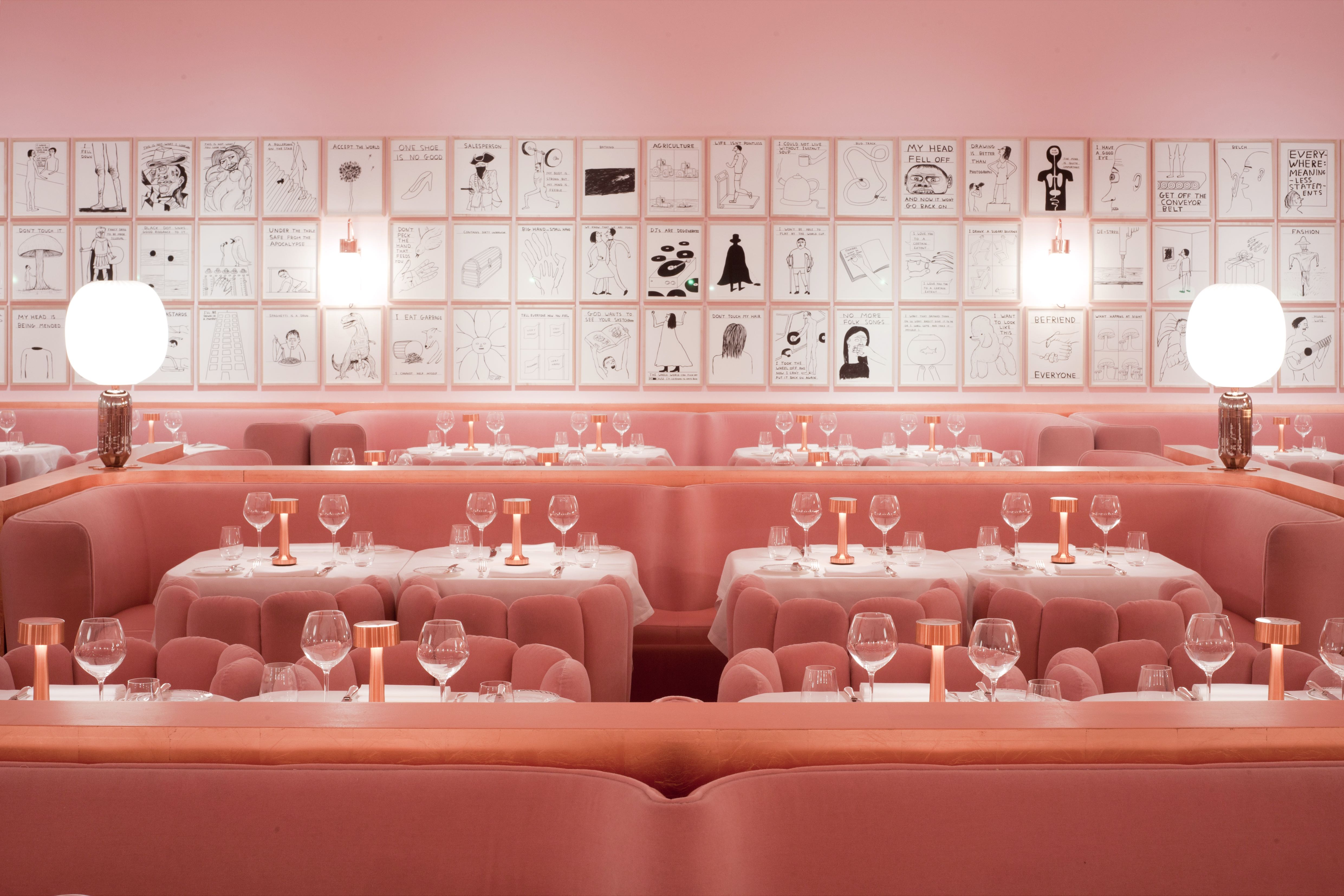
Mahdavi's design of Sketch

Shortly before opening her studio in 2000, Mahdavi worked with restaurateur Jonathan Morr on Townhouse, Miami in 1999. Following Townhouse Miami, Mahdavi designed a series of restaurants and bars, including the design of the Laduree restaurant in three locations: Los Angeles, Tokyo, and Geneva.

One of Mahdavi’s most notable projects, Sketch at the Gallery of London, attracted significant attention on social media. Her use of pink in it makes her one of the progenitors of the "millennial pink" trend, also connected to the film The Grand Budapest Hotel and leading to Pantone's Color of the Year Rose Quartz in 2016.

=== Furniture ===
Soon after founding her studio, Mahdavi began with an exploration into furniture pieces, and opened three showrooms along the Rue Las Casas in Paris, France. The first opening in 2003, and then two following in 2011 and 2020. These furniture lines began in 2003, with a small sample of works, then grew and developed into another exploration, Petits Objets in 2011. Petits Objets includes many different pieces, both functional and decorative, and Mahdavi’s color palette that would be used in many of her designs. One of her pieces, a combination stool and end table called Bishop, is part of the permanent collection of the Musée des Arts Décoratifs.

== Reception ==
Mahdavi is known for her creative use of color in her designs. Ralph Pucci, who has Mahdavi’s colorful furniture on display at the Ralph Pucci International Gallery says that her “work has humor, but it’s not 100 percent humor, which would make it kitsch. It has sophistication, but it’s not 100 percent sophistication, which would make it predictable. It’s this perfect balance that makes her work original.”

== Personal life ==
Mahdavi has one son, Miles, born in 1997.

== Awards ==
- Officier des Arts et des Lettres 2015
- Architectural Digest's 2014 AD100 list
- Designer of the Year by Maison et Objet 2004

== Publishing history ==
Yr	Book Title	Publishing Details	ISBN
2012	Home Chic	Flammarion	2080201417
2018	Tehrean Portraits de Villes		
