= List of public art in the London Borough of Wandsworth =

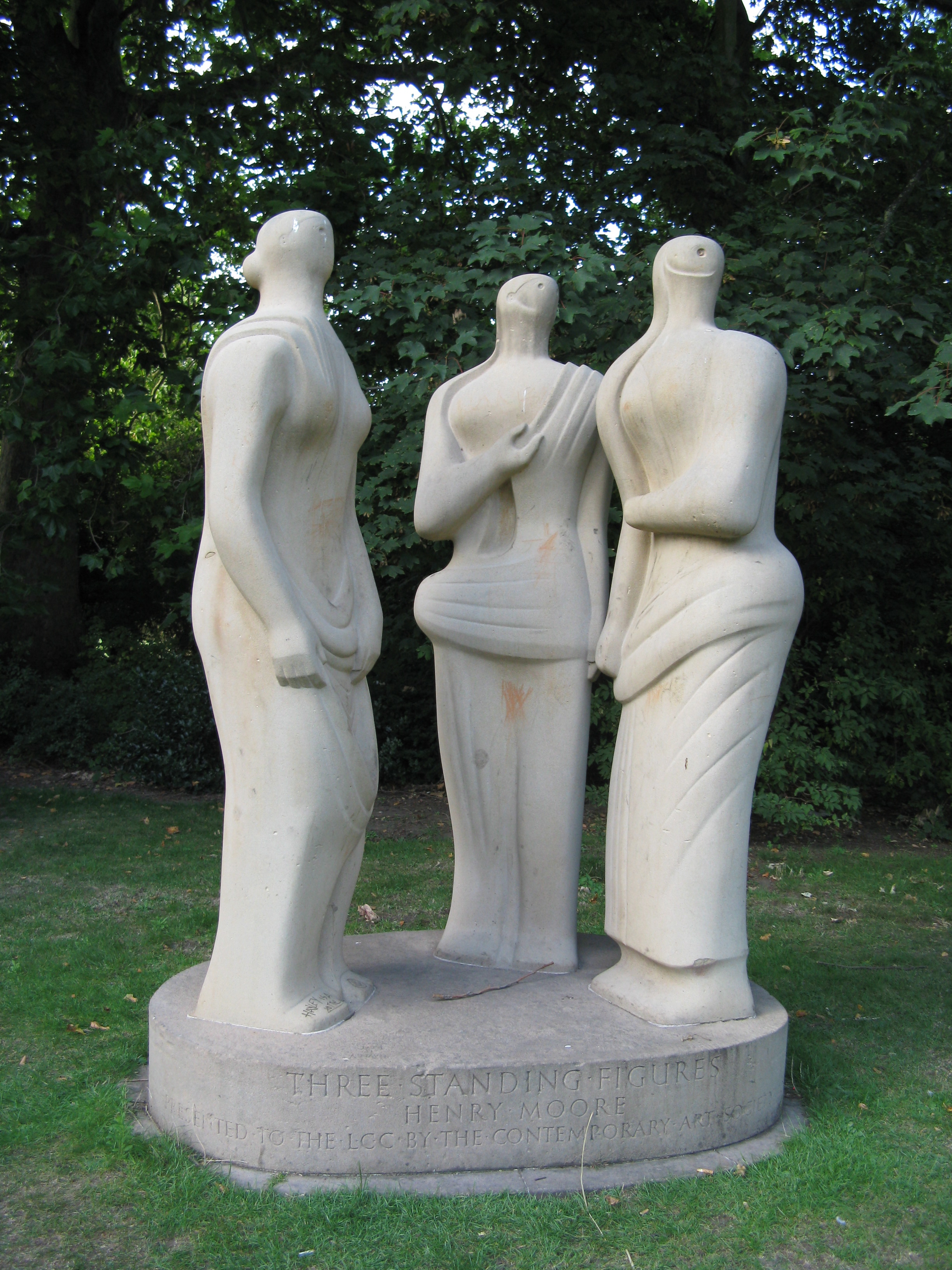
Three Standing Figures 1947 by Henry Moore in Battersea Park

This is a list of public art in the London Borough of Wandsworth.

== Balham ==
| Image | Title / subject | Location and coordinates | Date | Artist / designer | Type | Designation | Notes |
|---|---|---|---|---|---|---|---|
| More images | Impressions of Balham | Balham Station Road 51.4430°N 0.1513°W | 1991 | Christine Thomas and Julia Barton | Relief | —N/a | Four bronze reliefs of people shopping in the market, playing on the common, spending an evening at home and eating and drinking. |

== Battersea ==
| Image | Title / subject | Location and coordinates | Date | Artist / designer | Architect / other | Type | Designation | Notes |
|---|---|---|---|---|---|---|---|---|
| | In Town | Battersea Bridge Road | 1983 | John Ravera | —N/a | Sculptural group | —N/a | |
| | Two Swans | Battersea Bridge Road | 1984 | Catherine Marr-Johnson | —N/a | Sculptures | —N/a | |
| More images | Memorial to the Clapham Junction rail crash | Spencer Park 51.4580°N 0.1743°W | 1989 | Richard Healy | —N/a | Sculpture | —N/a | |
| | Sterling | Great Eastern Wharf | 1990 | Neil Lawson-Baker | —N/a | Sculpture | —N/a | |
| | Water Sculpture | Chelsea Bridge Wharf | 2003 | Caroline Lambard | —N/a | Sculpture | —N/a | |
| | Garden Tools and Sink | St John's Hill Estate, Clapham Junction | 2015–2016 | Rodney Harris | Hawkins Brown | Reliefs | —N/a | |
| | Pinafores and Uniform | St John's Hill Estate, Clapham Junction | 2015–2016 | Valda Jackson | Hawkins Brown | Reliefs | —N/a | |
| | Sunset, Sunrise, Sunset | Battersea Power Station tube station | 2021 | Alexandre da Cunha | Grimshaw Architects | Kinetic sculpture | —N/a | |

=== Battersea Park ===
Battersea Park has a history of displaying sculpture by major artists, with large triennial exhibitions in the 1940s, 50s and 60s, although the 1954 and 1957 exhibitions took place in Holland Park instead of Battersea Park. More recently the park presents an annual student sculpture prize with the winning sculpture going on show in for a year. Some of the current sculptures have remained in the park since the large exhibitions.

==== 1948 Open Air Exhibition of Sculpture ====
This was the first event of its type in Britain and showed 43 sculptures between May and September. The exhibition was extremely successful with over 170,000 visitors.

Selected sculptors and works:

- Auguste Rodin – The Age of Bronze/Man Awakening to Nature
- Ossip Zadkine – Laokoon
- Charles Despiau – Eve
- Henri Matisse – a bas-relief
- Barbara Hepworth – Helikon
- Henri Laurens – Les Ondines
- Eric Gill – Mankind
- Henry Moore – Recumbent Figure 1938, Three Standing Figures 1947
- Jacques Lipchitz – Figure
- Aristide Maillol – The Three Graces, Venus with necklace
- Jacob Epstein – Girl with Gardenias, The Visitation

==== 1951 exhibition Sculpture ====
44 sculptures including ones by Mari Andriessen, Bill?, Butler?, Siegfried Charoux, Charles Despiau, Dobson, Jacob Epstein, Alberto Giacometti, Eric Gill, Henning?, Barbara Hepworth, Maurice Lambert, Jacques Lipchitz, Aristide Maillol, Giacomo Manzù, Constantin Meunier, Henry Moore, Antoine Pevsner?, Auguste Rodin and Karel Vogel?.

==== 1960 exhibition Sculpture in the open air ====
42 sculptures were shown from British and French contemporary sculptors.

List of sculptors: Adams?, Kenneth Armitage, Jean Arp, Mark Batten, André Bloc, Brown?, Butler, Anthony Caro, Clatworthy, Lynn Chadwick, Siegfried Charoux, Richard Bentley Claughton, Marta Colvin, Hubert Dalwood, Dow?, Alan Durst, Jacob Epstein, Elisabeth Frink, Alfred Gerrard, Dora Gordine, Barbara Hepworth, Jean-Robert Ipoustéguy, Phillip King? or Peter King?, Eric Kennington, Gilbert Ledward, F. E. McWilliam, Martin?, Bernard Meadows, Henry Moore, Uli Nimptsch, Eduardo Paolozzi, Pablo Picasso, Germaine Richier, John Skeaping, François Stahly, William Turnbull, Josefina de Vasconcellos, Vogel, Charles Wheeler, Ossip Zadkine.

- Silent film from British Pathé of the sculptures
- News report from British Pathé of the sculptures

==== 1963 London County Council exhibition Sculpture in the open air ====
42 sculptures were shown, mainly from British and American contemporary artists.

List of sculptors: Adams, Peter Agostini, Kenneth Armitage, Leonard Baskin, Harry Bertoia, Brown, Butler, Anthony Caro, Alexander Calder, Lynn Chadwick, John Chamberlain, Geoffrey Clarke, Robert Clatworthy, Hubert Dalwood, George Ehrlich, Herbert Ferber, Elisabeth Frink, George Fullard, Joseph Goto, Dimitri Hadzi, Raoul Hague?, Anthony Hatwell, Barbara Hepworth, John Hoskin, Bryan Kneale, Seymour Lipton, F. E. McWilliam, Bernard Meadows, Henry Moore, Reuben Nakian, Uli Nimptsch, Phillip Pavia, Richmond?, George Rickey, Jose de Rivera, James Rosati, Schmidt?, Jason Seley, David Smith, Richard Stankiewicz, Peter Voulkos, William Turnbull.

==== 1966 Greater London Council exhibition Sculpture in the open air ====
42 sculptures were shown between May and September

List of sculptors: Adams, David Annesley, Kenneth Armitage, Michael Bolus, Brown, Antanas Braždys, Anthony Caro, Hubert Dalwood, Elisabeth Frink, George Fullard, David Hall, Barbara Hepworth, John Hoskin, Michael Kenny, King, Bryan Kneale, Kim Lim, F. E. McWilliam, Bernard Meadows, Henry Moore, Francis Morland, Eduardo Paolozzi, Pickett?, Scott?, Smith, William G. Tucker, Brian Wall

- Silent film from British Pathé of the sculptures and a visit by Princess Margaret

==== Battersea sculpture prize ====
Partial table of winners

| Year | Sculptor | Title | Details |
|---|---|---|---|
| 2014 | Michael Pecirno | The Air Above | |
| 2013 | Anna Fleming | Magpie Feather | |
| 2012 | Luke Burton | This & That & These & Those | |
| 2011 (13th) | Lucy Tomlins | Concrete Country | |
| 2010 | Dexter Dymoke | Bench | |
| 2008 | Gareth Williams | Ip Dip Dip | |
| 2007 | Maxine Schaffer | Buckhorn Plantain | |
| 2003 | Andrew Broadbent | F-1 | |
| 2002 (7th) | John Summers | Reborn | |
| 2001 | Wilhelmina Baldwin | Nor'Stand | |
| 2000 | Kieran Doyle | Dual Nature | |
| 1999 | Steve Bunn | Rollercoaster | |
| 1998 | Si Sapsford | | |
| 1997 | Thomas Ostenberg | | |

==== Current ====
| Image | Title / subject | Location and coordinates | Date | Artist / designer | Type | Designation | Notes |
|---|---|---|---|---|---|---|---|
| More images | 24th East Surrey Division War Memorial | Battersea Park 51.4805°N 0.1538°W | 1924 | Eric Kennington | Sculptural group | Grade II* | |
| More images | Three Standing Figures | Battersea Park 51.4781°N 0.1569°W | 1948 | Henry Moore | Sculptural group | Grade II | |
| | Single Form (Memorial) | Battersea Park 51.4774°N 0.1529°W | 1961–1962 | Barbara Hepworth | Sculpture | —N/a | |
| More images | Brown Dog Memorial | Battersea Park | 1985 | Nicola Hicks | Sculpture | —N/a | |
| | Australian World War II Air Crew Memorial | Battersea Park | 1995 | | War memorial | —N/a | Erected 15 May 1995. |
| | ANZAC Gallipoli War Memorial | Battersea Park | 1998 | | War memorial | —N/a | Opened 25 April 1998; unveiled 25 April 2000. |
| | Sheep-seat | Battersea Park | 2000 | Mark Folds | Wooden carved bench | —N/a | |
| | F-1 | Battersea Park | 2003 | Andrew Broadbent | Sculpture | —N/a | |

== Nine Elms ==
| Image | Title / subject | Location and coordinates | Date | Artist / designer | Type | Designation | Notes |
|---|---|---|---|---|---|---|---|
| | ROD | Embassy Gardens | 2010–2014 | Mohamed Qasim Ashfaq | Sculpture | —N/a | |
| | Florian | Embassy Gardens | 2013 | Sarah Lucas | Sculpture | —N/a | A giant marrow cast in bronze, alluding to the vegetables sold at the nearby New Covent Garden Market. |
| | Skystation | Riverlight | 2013 | Peter Newman | Sculpture | —N/a | Inspired by Le Corbusier's chaise longue design. |
| | Modern Marriage | Embassy Gardens | 2014 | Simon Fujiwara | Sculpture | —N/a | |
| | Terra Ludi | Riverlight | 2017 | Simon and Tom Bloor | Sculpture | —N/a | Includes bronze cast of a felled tree with stone outcrops and stepping stones. |
| | Light & Water | Riverlight | 2017 | Kate Davis and David Moore | Sculptures | —N/a | |

== Putney ==
| Image | Title / subject | Location and coordinates | Date | Artist / designer | Type | Material | Dimensions | Designation | Owner / administrator | Notes |
|---|---|---|---|---|---|---|---|---|---|---|
| More images | Hartley Memorial Obelisk | Putney Heath, near the A3 51°26′51.72″N 0°13′30.72″W | 1776 | Attributed to George Dance the Younger | | Red brick, stone, concrete slab | | Grade II | | Erected on the centenary of the Great Fire of London "in memory of an invention for securing buildings against fire" |
| More images | Putney War Memorial | Church Square, Putney High Street 51°27′57.37″N 0°12′49.33″W | 1921 | | | | | Grade II | | Erected 16 June 1921 in St Mary's Churchyard; moved to the current site in 2005. |
| | Armillary sphere | Point Pleasant 51°27′45.24″N 0°11′57.46″W | 1997 | David Harber | Armillary sphere | Metal | | | | |
| | Water Finds a Level | Putney Embankment Foreshore | 2022 | Claire Barclay | Installation | Bronze and granite | | —N/a | | Three artworks, one of which incorporates the Boat Race starting stone. |

== Roehampton ==
| Image | Title / subject | Location and coordinates | Date | Artist / designer | Architect / other | Type | Material | Designation | Notes |
|---|---|---|---|---|---|---|---|---|---|
| More images | Pavilion for drinking fountain and horse trough | Junction of Roehampton Lane (A306) and Medfield Street 51°26′56.64″N 0°14′23.92″W | 1882 | Henry Dasson | J. C. Radford | Drinking fountain | Grey and red granite | Grade II | |
| | Mother and Child | Whitelands College, University of Roehampton | 1951 | Willi Soukop | —N/a | Sculpture | Concrete and terracotta | —N/a | |
| More images | Roehampton War Memorial | Putney Heath 51.4504°N 0.2358°W | 1952 | | | Memorial cross | Stone | Grade II | Replaces an earlier memorial largely destroyed by bombing in World War II. |
| | The Watchers | Alton Estate 51.4529°N 0.2453°W | 1960 | Lynn Chadwick | —N/a | Sculptural group | Bronze | Grade II | |
| More images | The Bull | Alton Estate 51.4521°N 0.2479°W | 1961 | Robert Clatworthy | —N/a | Sculpture | Bronze | Grade II* | |
| | Mother and Child | Southlands College, University of Roehampton | 1972–1973 | Ernst Eisenmayer | —N/a | Sculpture | Metal | —N/a | |
| | Spirits of the Wood | Whitelands College, University of Roehampton | Early 21st century | Janet MacLeod | —N/a | Sculpture | Bronze resin | —N/a | |
| | Dickie and Sam | outside Queen Mary's Hospital | 2009 | Brian Alabaster MRBS | —N/a | Sculpture | Bronze | —N/a | |
| | In memory of Hugh Colin Smith | Mount Clare | | | | Statue | | | |

== Southfields ==
| Image | Title / subject | Location and coordinates | Date | Artist / designer | Type | Material | Designation | Notes |
|---|---|---|---|---|---|---|---|---|
| | Southfields War Memorial | St Barnabas' churchyard 51.4427°N 0.1977°W | 1919 | Whitehead and Sons | Calvary | Cornish granite | Grade II | Unveiled 4 October 1919. |
| | Statue of Fanny Wilkinson | Coronation Gardens 51.4468°N 0.1999°W | 2025 | Gillian Brett | Statue | Bronze | —N/a | Unveiled 3 July 2025, on a renovated drinking fountain from 1904. |

== Streatham ==
| Image | Title / subject | Location and coordinates | Date | Artist / designer | Type | Material | Dimensions | Designation | Owner / administrator | Notes |
|---|---|---|---|---|---|---|---|---|---|---|
| | War Memorial | Streatham Cemetery 51°26′0.31″N 0°10′30.95″W | | | | | | | | |

== Tooting ==
| Image | Title / subject | Location and coordinates | Date | Artist / designer | Type | Designation | Notes |
|---|---|---|---|---|---|---|---|
| | St Benedict's Clock Tower | 51°25′31.14″N 0°9′26.86″W | 1888 | | Clock tower | | The subject of a pound-for-pound scheme in which restoration works including timber repairs and renewal of the lead cupola were half met by a conservation grant from Wandsworth Borough Council. The tower originally adorned St Joseph's Roman Catholic college, built in 1888. In 1897 this became the Tooting Home workhouse, and then in 1930 St Benedict's Hospital, which closed in 1981. |
| More images | Statue of Edward VII | Outside Tooting Broadway tube station, junction A24 and A217 51°25′39.97″N 0°10′4.71″W | 1911 | Louis Fritz Roselieb | Statue | Grade II | The inscription on the base reads ERECTED BY PUBLIC SUBSCRIPTION, 1911. Reliefs on either side show personifications of Peace and Charity. This was the first statue of Edward VII to be erected after his death. |
| | War memorial | All Saints' churchyard 51.4302°N 0.1571°W | c. 1920 | ? | Memorial cross | Grade II | |
| | Joseph James Jones Memorial Drinking Fountain | Tooting Bec Common, Dr Johnson Avenue | 1938 | ? | Drinking fountain | | Jones was a local architect and surveyor who funded a trust to benefit schools in the area. |
| | Cherry Tree Bench | Outside Tesco Express, Upper Tooting Road, SW17 7EN 51°25′57.42″N 0°9′49.89″W | ? | ? | Bench | —N/a | |

== Wandsworth ==
| Image | Title / subject | Location and coordinates | Date | Artist / designer | Type | Material | Dimensions | Designation | Owner / administrator | Notes |
|---|---|---|---|---|---|---|---|---|---|---|
| | Huguenot memorial | Mount Nod 51°27′30.1″N 0°10′59.5″W | | | | | | | | |
| | Saint George and the Dragon | Royal Victoria Patriotic Building 51°27′12.73″N 0°10′29.65″W | 1857–1859 | | Architectural sculpture | | | | | |
| | Reliefs of locals in the district's history | Wandsworth Town Hall 51°27′24.48″N 0°11′25.33″W | 1935–1937 | David Evans and John Linehan | Architectural sculpture (frieze) | | | Grade II | | |
| | Coat of arms of the Metropolitan Borough of Wandsworth | Wandsworth Town Hall 51°27′25.49″N 0°11′24.9″W | 1935–1937 | Edward A. Hunt | Architectural sculpture (relief) | | | Grade II | | |
| | Advertising hoarding | Wandsworth roundabout 51°27′44.69″N 0°11′7.65″W | | | | | | | JCDecaux | Similar to another on Old Street Roundabout. |
| | Sail | The Spit, close to the mouth of the River Wandle 51°27′42.07″N 0°11′41.06″W | 2003 | Sophie Horton | Sculpture | Etched stainless steel with powder coating | 460 x 250 x 250cm | | | |
| | Tide-powered bell | Bell Lane Creek, The Causeway 51°27′35.4″N 0°11′36.5″W | November 1993 | Whitechapel Bell Foundry | Installation | | | | Wandsworth Borough Council | Installed by the Platform arts and environment group. |

== Wimbledon ==
Part of Wimbledon lies outside the borough of Wandsworth; for other works located there, see List of public art in the London Borough of Merton § Wimbledon

| Image | Title / subject | Location and coordinates | Date | Artist / designer | Type | Designation | Notes |
|---|---|---|---|---|---|---|---|
| | Wimbledon Park War Memorial | St Paul's churchyard, Augustus Road 51.4431°N 0.2190°W | 1920 | ? | Calvary | Grade II | Unveiled 24 January 1920. |
| More images | Wandsworth and Wimbledon War Memorial | Wimbledon Common 51°26′7.18″N 0°14′48.98″W | 1921 | Madeline Agar with Brenda Colvin | Memorial cross | Grade II | Unveiled 15 July 1925. |
| | War memorial | Putney Vale Cemetery 51°26′20.05″N 0°14′45.01″W | | | | | Tucked away along the side wall, close to the Stag Lane entrance, next to a branch of ASDA, is this forgotten memorial. It appears to have only women's names. |
| More images | Tangier Regiment of Foot War Memorial | Putney Heath | 1961 | ? | Stone of remembrance | —N/a | Additional inscriptions recording the formation in 1959 of the regiment's successor, the Queen's Royal Surrey Regiment, were added in 1986. |
