= The Watchers (sculpture) =

Sculpture series by Lynn Chadwick

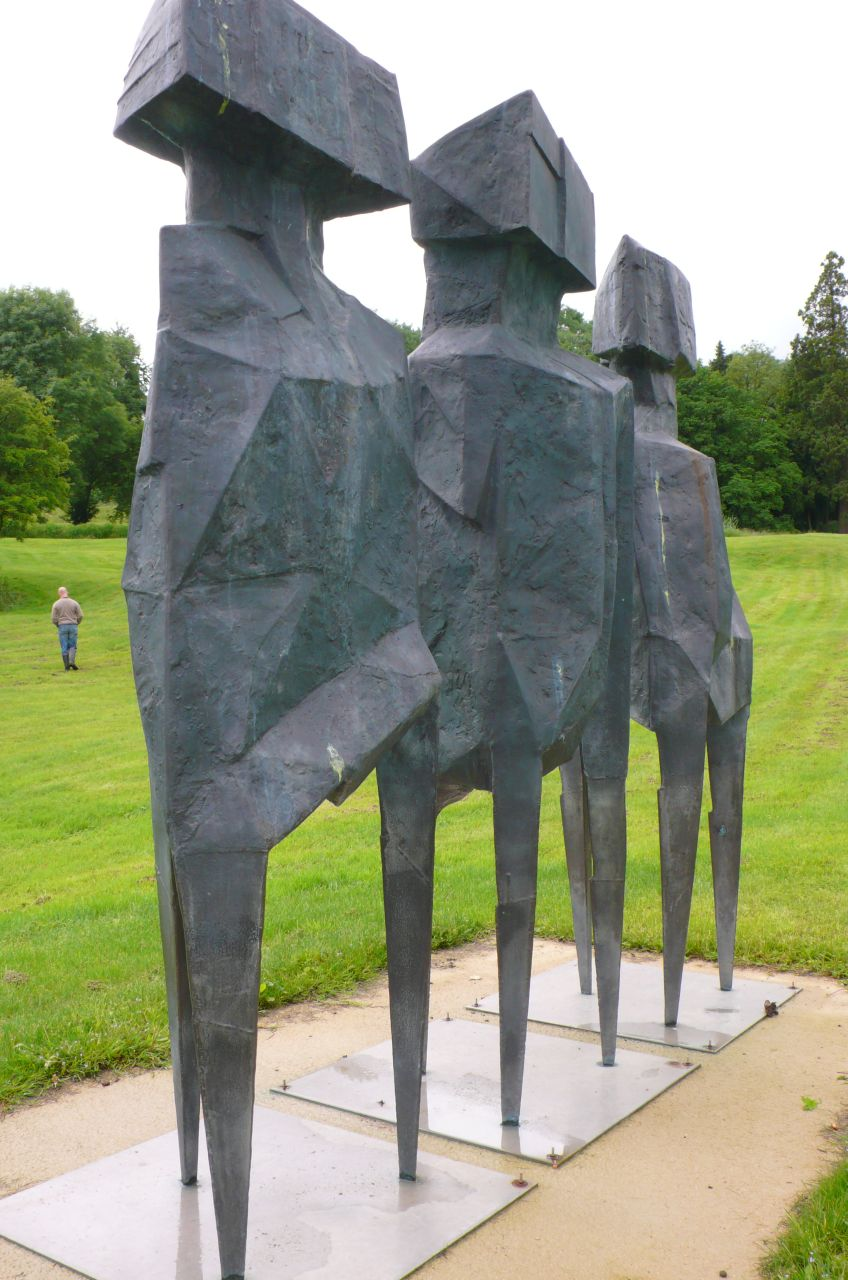
- A casting of The Watchers in Lypiatt Park
- Artist: Lynn Chadwick
- Year: 1960
- Medium: Bronze sculpture
- Location: Various

The Watchers is a 1960 bronze sculpture by the British sculptor Lynn Chadwick depicting three abstracted figures whose form is inspired by the Moai.

Four castings were made: these are currently on display in the San Diego Museum of Art's May S. Marcy Sculpture Garden, Roehampton University in London, Loughborough University and Ursinus College, Pennsylvania.

== Theft and recasting of figure ==
One of the three figures at Roehampton University was stolen in 2006, possibly to be sold as scrap metal. The remaining figures were placed into storage shortly afterwards. In 2014, the University obtained permission from Chadwick's estate to recast the missing figure and the sculpture was returned to its original location in full.

== See also ==
- 1960 in art
- List of public art in the London Borough of Wandsworth
- Bull (by Robert Clatworthy), another sculpture on the Alton Estate, London
