= Leslie Thornton =

Leslie Thornton may refer to:

- Leslie Thornton (filmmaker) (born 1951), American filmmaker
- Leslie Thornton (sculptor) (1925–2016), British sculptor
