= Bull (sculpture) =

Sculpture by Robert Clatworthy

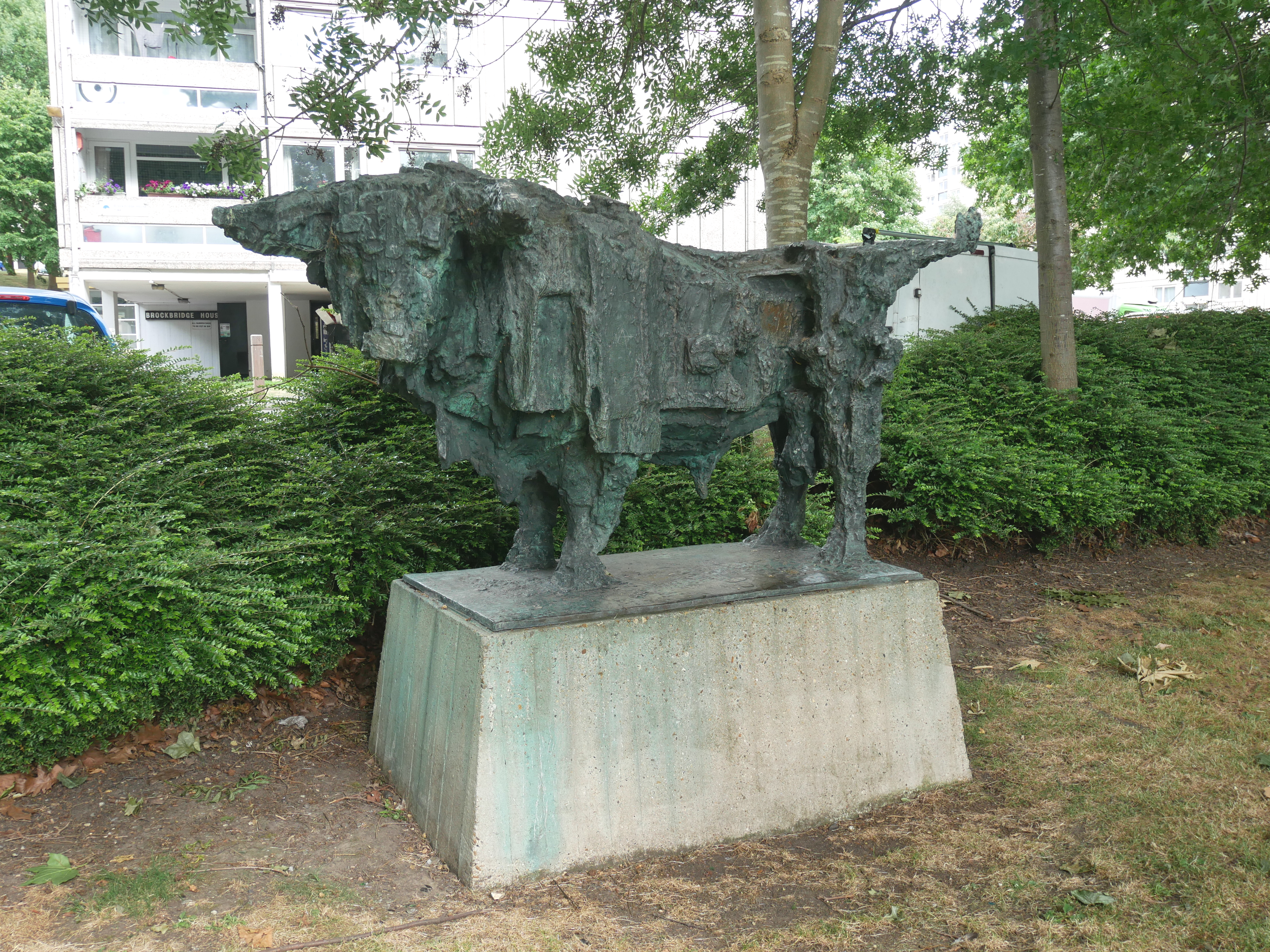
- Artist: Robert Clatworthy
- Year: 1961
- Medium: Bronze
- Movement: New Brutalism, Geometry of Fear
- Subject: Bull
- Designation: Grade II* listed
- Location: Roehampton, London; 51.4503°N 0.2447°W
- Owner: Wandsworth Council

Bull is a Grade II* listed sculpture by Robert Clatworthy, in Daneburry Avenue, Roehampton, London.

The sculpture is a 1961 version of Clatworthy's plaster figure from 1959. It was commissioned by the London County Council at the behest of A. W. Cleeve Barr, one of the lead architects for the Alton Estate in Roehampton.

In October 2024 the Bull was restored as part of a project, commissioned by Wandsworth Council, overseen by its regeneration team in collaboration with the History of London Trust.
