= Recumbent Figure 1938 =

Sculpture by Henry Moore

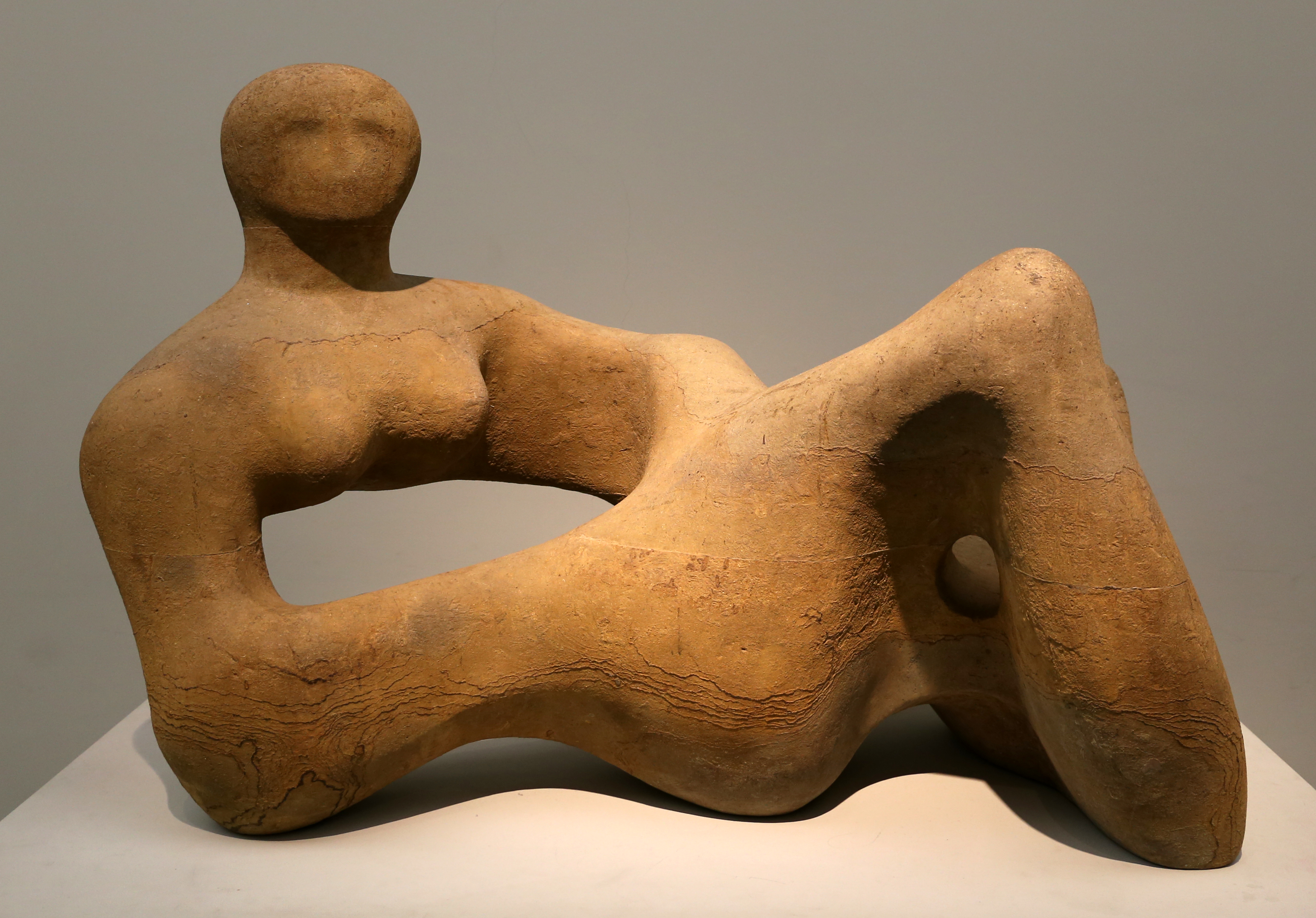
- Sculpture in Tate Britain
- Artist: Henry Moore
- Year: 1938
- Catalogue: LH 191
- Medium: Green Hornton stone
- Dimensions: 139 cm (55 in)
- Location: Tate, London

Recumbent Figure 1938 (LH191) is an early sculpture by Henry Moore. It was commissioned by the architect Serge Chermayeff for his modernist villa at Bentley Wood, near Halland, Sussex. At the time it was made, it was Moore's largest stone sculpture. It was donated to the Tate Gallery in 1939, making it the first example of Moore's work in a public collection.

== Description ==
Moore's large stone sculpture depicts a reclining female figure, which resembles the undulating landscape of the South Downs nearby. Chermayeff's commission was the first free-standing sculpture that Moore made to complement a specific building, a requirement that became a key feature of his later work. Moore considered the work to be site specific.

It was made from three blocks of Green Hornton, a Jurassic limestone from a quarry near Banbury in Oxfordshire. It was carved by hand, over a period of about 5 weeks, with Moore working outdoors at his cottage, Burcroft, in Kingston, Kent, assisted by Bernard Meadows. One block forms the head, which is abstracted to a bud, with shallow depressions for eyes and slight ridges for a nose and brows. The two other blocks were used for the body and legs. The figure has noticeable shoulders and arms, with pendant breasts hanging over a space where the torso should be, linked to an abdomen and legs. It measures 88.9 by 132.7 by 73.7 centimetres (35.0 in × 52.2 in × 29.0 in) and weighs 520 kilograms (1,150 lb).

Recumbent Figure was based on a smaller sculpture, perhaps the first time Moore create a maquette first rather that moving directly to the final sculpture. The maquette is 13 cm long, and was originally cast in lead in an edition of three; later, two bronze editions of ten and eleven respectively were produced. One of the bronze casts is now owned by the Henry Moore Foundation. Three drawings by Moore are also related to the Recumbent Figure: Reclining Figures (HMF 1184), Drawing for Sculpture: Reclining Figures (HMF 1394), and Ideas for Sculpture: Reclining Figures (HMF 1396).

The work is a development of Moore's earlier stone sculptures Reclining Figure 1929 (LH 59), which was made in Brown Hornton limestone, and his Reclining Woman (Mountains) 1930 (LH 84); and his elmwood sculpture Reclining Figure 1935–6. It is less blocky and more rounded than the earlier works, and pierced with holes through.

== Reception ==
The completed sculpture was delivered in 1938, but Chermayeff had paid only the £50 deposit of the £300 price before he became bankrupt in 1939. Chermayeff suggested to Moore that he could take the sculpture back and resell it. Moore returned the deposit and the sculpture was returned to him. At the suggestion of Kenneth Clark, it was offered to the Museum of Modern Art (MOMA) in New York, but the gallery declined. Clark then arranged for the Contemporary Art Society to buy it for £300, and the society presented it to the Tate Gallery in 1939. The Tate's previous director JB Manson had said Moore would appear in the gallery over his dead body; Manson retired in 1938, and his successor John Rothenstein was much more welcoming.

The sculpture went on loan for display at the British Pavilion at the 1939 New York World's Fair, and was still in the US when the Second World War broke out. Along with several other works by British sculptors, it was kept in MOMA's sculpture garden in New York during the war, where it suffered damage from the cold winter weather. It was vandalised by a group of US Marines one night in 1944, pushed off its plinth and the head broken off. After being repaired, and the end of the war, it returned to the Tate in 1946. It was displayed at the first London County Council open-air sculpture exhibition at Battersea Park from May 1948, alongside other works by Moore including his Three Standing Figures 1947.

The sculpture became a popular feature at the Tate Gallery in London. It was selected as the example of Moore's work to be depicted on a tile mural at Pimlico Underground station, near the gallery, in 1972. It was also one of twelve Moore sculptures included in the "Sculpture for the Blind" exhibition at the Tate in 1972, when blind and partially sighted visitors were encouraged to touch the artworks.

== See also ==
- List of sculptures by Henry Moore
