= Geometry of Fear =

Post-war group of British sculptors

- Years active: 1950s
- Location: United Kingdom
- Major figures: Kenneth Armitage; Reg Butler; Lynn Chadwick
- Influences: Alberto Giacometti; Germaine Richier

The Geometry of Fear was an informal group or school of young British sculptors in the years after the Second World War. The term was coined by Herbert Read in 1952 in his description of the work of the eight British artists represented in the "New Aspects of British Sculpture" exhibition at the Biennale di Venezia of 1952.

== Venice ==
The eight artists who exhibited "New Aspects of British Sculpture" in the British pavilion at the Biennale di Venezia of 1952 were Robert Adams, Kenneth Armitage, Reg Butler, Lynn Chadwick, Geoffrey Clarke, Bernard Meadows, Eduardo Paolozzi and William Turnbull. All were under 40, with years of birth ranging from 1913 to 1924, and of a younger generation than established British sculptors such as Barbara Hepworth and Henry Moore. A large bronze by Moore, Double Standing Figure, stood outside the British pavilion, and contrasted strongly with the works inside. Unlike the smoothly carved work of Hepworth and Moore, these were angular, jagged, rough-textured or spiky. They were more linear and open; Philip Hendy compared Butler's sculptures to three-dimensional drawings. Many of the sculptures in the pavilion were of human or animal figures, and several showed the influence of the continental sculptors Germaine Richier and Alberto Giacometti, works by whom had been shown at the Anglo-French Art Centre in London in 1947. The British sculptures were seen as reflecting the angst, the anxieties and the guilt of the immediate post-War period, with the recent memory of the War, the Holocaust and Hiroshima, and the fear of nuclear proliferation and the effects of the Cold War.

In his catalogue description, Herbert Read wrote:

These new images belong to the iconography of despair, or of defiance; and the more innocent the artist, the more effectively he transmits the collective guilt. Here are images of flight, of ragged claws "scuttling across the floors of silent seas", of excoriated flesh, frustrated sex, the geometry of fear.

Read's quotation "scuttling across the floors of silent seas" is from The Love Song of J. Alfred Prufrock by T.S. Eliot and is a reference to Crab, a sculpture by Bernard Meadows in the exhibition. Read's words were widely quoted, and despite the differences in style and technique between the eight artists, they came to be known as the Geometry of Fear group.

=== Reception ===
The Geometry of Fear exhibition was well received, both within and outside Britain. Alfred Barr, the former director of the New York Museum of Modern Art, spoke highly of the sculptors and bought work by three of them – Robert Adams, Reg Butler and Lynn Chadwick – for the museum; he described the exhibition as "the most distinguished national showing of the Biennale". All eight sculptors achieved rapid recognition and career success in the 1950s. In 1953 Butler won the international competition to design the monument to the Unknown Political Prisoner, chosen over more than two thousand entries including submissions by Naum Gabo and Barbara Hepworth; the prize was £4500, enough at the time to buy a large house. In 1956 Lynn Chadwick won the Grand Prize for Sculpture at the Biennale di Venezia of that year, selected over César, Giacometti and Richier.

Within a decade the Geometry of Fear group had fallen from view. In the 1960s British sculpture was dominated by the abstract, particularly that associated with Anthony Caro and his circle at Saint Martin's School of Art. Figurative expressionism and post-war angst were out of style. Butler's eighteen-metre Unknown Political Prisoner was never executed; he, like Adams, Clarke and Meadows, essentially disappeared. Chadwick and Armitage were neglected in Britain but had some following in other countries, while Paolozzi and Turnbull began to work in different styles and remained in the public eye.

== Other artists ==
While the Geometry of Fear group initially consisted only of the eight sculptors who exhibited in Venice in 1952, and never had any of the characteristics of an art movement, other artists have been associated with it, or thought to have been influenced by it. These include, among others, the sculptors Ralph Brown, Anthony Caro (in his early work), Robert Clatworthy, Hubert Dalwood, Elisabeth Frink, George Fullard, John Hoskin and Leslie Thornton, and the painter John Berger. The post-War paintings of Francis Bacon and Graham Sutherland share some of the Atomic Age anxieties of the Geometry of Fear sculptors.
