= Leslie Thornton (sculptor) =

English sculptor (1925–2016)

- Born: Leslie Tillotson Thornton; 26 May 1925; Skipton, West Riding of Yorkshire, England
- Died: 9 February 2016 (aged 90)
- Education: Leeds College of Art, Royal College of Art
- Known for: Sculpture
- Movement: Modernism, Abstract art

Leslie Tillotson Thornton (26 May 1925 – 9 February 2016) was an English sculptor.

== Education and early life ==
Born in Skipton, West Riding of Yorkshire, Thornton attended Keighley Art School from 1940 to 1942 before being conscripted to work as a Bevin Boy in the Yorkshire coalmines to aid the war effort in 1943. From 1945 to 1948 he attended Leeds College of Art on a County Art Scholarship and from 1948 to 1951 trained at the sculpture school of the Royal College of Art.

== Career ==
In 1951 Thornton graduated from the Royal College of Art and joined the Royal Society of British Sculptors. He began work as a visiting lecturer at Bromley School of Art, Hammersmith School of Art and Central School of Art, before taking the post of Senior Lecturer at the University of Sunderland in 1965. In 1970 he left this position to head up the Sculpture Department at the University of Stafford.

Thornton was a sculptor linked to the celebrated Geometry of Fear group which redefined the medium in post-war Britain. He considered line rather than mass to be the expression of a more urgent fleetingly emotive quality in the uneasy atmosphere of the immediate post war years.

Thornton sculpted in metal having been inspired by the idea of making three-dimensional equivalents of the drawings of Rembrandt, which he hugely admired. This he achieved by welding “a little comb” of tiny, fine metal rods to emulate Rembrandt's cross-hatching, a theory he successfully put into practice in one of his earliest sculptures, Roundabout 1955, Peggy Guggenheim Collection.

His key sculptures from the 1950s and 1960s were designed and welded individually rather than cast in a series and are therefore now very rare.

In 1955, Thornton joined Eduardo Paolozzi, Kenneth Armitage and Elizabeth Frink for the British Council's internationally touring Young British Sculptors exhibition, and the Institute of Contemporary Arts included some of his work in their New Sculptors Exhibition in London. The same year he showed at the New Sculptors and Painters Exhibition at the Institute of Contemporary Arts in London. In 1956 he was included in the landmark This is Tomorrow exhibition at the Whitechapel Art Gallery and in 1957 he held his first solo exhibition at the Gimpel Fils Gallery in London. During the 1960s his sculpture appeared in group exhibitions across Europe and America. In 1961 he was commissioned to create a work for the Daily Mirror building, In 1965 he was commissioned to make two crucifixes for St Louis Priory in Missouri, and in 1968 he was commissioned to make a third for St Ignatius' College, Enfield. In 1969 he published an 8-page book, titled Recent Sculpture

In 2004 the Moore Institute in Leeds included him in their 100 Years of Sculpture exhibition, and from 2007 to 2009 he appeared in the Arts Council's touring Geometry of Fear exhibition.

Thornton's sculpture is represented in major international private and public collections including: the Peggy Guggenheim Collection, Venice; the Museum of Modern Art, New York; the Arts Council of Great Britain; Leeds City Art Gallery; Northern Arts Council; Scottish National Gallery of Modern Art, City of Art Museum, St Louis, US; the Albright-Knox Gallery, Buffalo, New York; the Felton Bequest, Australia; St Louis Priory, Missouri, US.

Thornton had a daughter named Lisa Jane, a son named David and two grandchildren Stephanie and James.
