= Frank Martin (sculptor) =

British sculptor

Frank Graeme Martin
- Born: 27 December 1914; Portsmouth, Hampshire
- Died: 19 January 2004 (aged 89); Clacton-on-Sea, Essex
- Education: Portsmouth Art School; Royal Academy Schools
- Known for: sculpture
- Spouse: Edna Downton

Frank Martin (27 December 1914 – 19 January 2004) was a British sculptor. He was head of the sculpture department of Saint Martin's School of Art from 1952 to 1979. He brought young and forward-thinking sculptors into the department to teach, among them Anthony Caro, Robert Clatworthy, Elisabeth Frink and Eduardo Paolozzi. They and those round them came to be known as the New Generation of British sculptors. In the 1960s and 1970s the sculpture department at Saint Martin's was, in the words of Tim Scott: "the most famous in the art world".

== Life ==
Frank Graeme Martin was born in Portsmouth, Hampshire, on 27 December 1914. He studied at Portsmouth Art School, and moved to London where he worked as an artist's model. He also worked as a sculptor's assistant, first to Charles Wheeler, later president of the Royal Academy, and then, for about two years until the outbreak of war, for William McMillan, for whom he also sat. During the Second World War Martin was a Royal Marine. He used his physique as a model for the figures in a fountain Charles Wheeler and William McMillian sculpted for Trafalgar Square. Observing the work of these sculptors inspired him to pursue knowledge in the field of stone and terracotta after the war.

After the war he studied part-time at the Royal Academy Schools. In 1946 or 1947 he began teaching clay modelling at Saint Martin's, and soon after was asked to set up a sculpture department.

Martin died of cancer at his home in Clacton-on-Sea on 19 January 2004.

== Recognition ==
In 2012 a Frank Martin Sculpture Fellowship was established at Central Saint Martins (into which Saint Martin's School of Art was merged in 1989) in his memory.
