= List of public art in the London Borough of Merton =

This is a list of public art in the London Borough of Merton.

== Colliers Wood ==
Image	Title / subject	Location and coordinates	Date	Artist / designer	Type	Designation	Notes
More images	John Feeney Memorial Fountain	Wandle Park 51.4173°N 0.1796°W	1907	?	Drinking fountain	Grade II	
More images	Ashby–Fenwick Memorial Fountain Harold Pollard Ashby (1809–1892) Robert Bloomfield Fenwick (1835–1897)	Wandle Park	1911	Fritz Roselieb (lost statue); Helen Frazer Rock (lost medallions)	Drinking fountain	—	

== Merton Park ==
Image	Title / subject	Location and coordinates	Date	Artist / designer	Type	Designation	Notes
	Merton War Memorial	St Mary's churchyard 51.4104°N 0.2021°W	1920 (designed); erected 1921	H. P. Burke Downing	Memorial cross	Grade II	

== Mitcham ==
Image	Title / subject	Location and coordinates	Date	Artist / designer	Type	Designation	Notes
More images	Obelisk	Junction of Cricket Green and Madeira Road 51.3992°N 0.1646°W	1822	?	Obelisk	Grade II	
More images	Memorial to George Parker Bidder	Mitcham Common 51.3971°N 0.1549°W	1896	?	Memorial stone	Grade II	
More images	Clock	Upper Green East 51.4061°N 0.1640°W	1897	?	Clock	Grade II	
	Mitcham War Memorial	Lower Green West 51.4024°N 0.1699°W	1920	?	Memorial cross	Grade II	Unveiled 21 November 1920.
	Memorial to Tom Ruff	Mitcham Cricket Green, London Road	1962	?	Commemorative stone	—	At the time of his death in March 1962, Ruff was mayor of Mitcham. The names of outstanding Mitcham cricketers were added in 2014.

== Morden ==
Image	Title / subject	Location and coordinates	Date	Artist / designer	Architect / other	Type	Designation	Notes
	Neptune	Morden Hall Park 51.4013°N 0.1867°W	18th century	?	—	Statue	Grade II	
	Venus and Cupid	Morden Hall Park 51.4037°N 0.1878°W	18th century	?	—	Statue	Grade II	
	Lion and Unicorn	Entrance to King George's Field, Tudor Drive, Lower Morden	1940s	?	?	Reliefs		
	Kingfisher	Over exit from Garth Road Recycling Depot	as at March 2012				—	

== Raynes Park ==
Image	Title / subject	Location and coordinates	Date	Artist / designer	Architect / other	Type	Designation	Notes
	Raynes Park War Memorial	St Saviour's churchyard 51.4055°N 0.2295°W	1920–1921 (erected)	T. Mewburn Crook	Arthur Blomfield	Memorial cross	Grade II	

== Wimbledon ==
Part of Wimbledon lies outside the borough of Merton; for other works located there, see List of public art in the London Borough of Wandsworth § Wimbledon

Image	Title / subject	Location and coordinates	Date	Artist / designer	Architect / other	Type	Designation	Notes
More images	Diana with a Fawn	Cannizaro Park 51.4256°N 0.2319°W	1843	?	—	Statue	Grade II	
More images	Joseph Toynbee Memorial Fountain	Wimbledon Hill Road, at the junction with Belvedere Grove 51.4243°N 0.2156°W	1868	—	?	Drinking fountain	Grade II	
	Busts of William Shakespeare and John Milton	Outside Wimbledon Library 51.4222°N 0.2084°W	1886	?	?	Architectural sculpture		
More images	Pagoda Drinking Fountain Robert William Hanbury	Parkside 51.4283°N 0.2238°W	1903	Wills Brothers	—	Drinking fountain	Grade II	
	Laetitia and globe	On roof of New Wimbledon Theatre 51.4193°N 0.2016°W	1910 (removed for safety in war 1939; reinstated 1991)	?	Cecil Massey and Roy Young	Architectural sculpture	Grade II	
	War memorial	St Winefride's Church, Latimer Road 51.4196°N 0.1938°W	After 1918	?	—	Calvary	Grade II	
More images	Wimbledon War Memorial	Parkside 51.4262°N 0.2223°W	1921	Charles Leonard Hartwell	Thomas Graham Jackson	War memorial	Grade II	Unveiled 5 November 1921.
More images	King's Royal Rifle Corps War Memorial	Wimbledon Common 51.4383°N 0.2302°W	1929	?	—	War memorial	Grade II	
More images	Statue of Fred Perry	All England Lawn Tennis and Croquet Club, Church Road 51.4343°N 0.2135°W	1984	David Wynne	—	Statue	—	Unveiled by Prince Edward, Duke of Kent.
More images	Walking Women	The Broadway	1992	André Wallace	—	Sculpture	—	
	Concourse	Wimbledon station 51.42111°N 0.20611°W	1998	Bruce Williams	—	Sculpture	—	Laser-cut images of crowds watching tennis at Wimbledon.
More images	Millennium Fountain	Cannizaro Park	2001	Richard Rome	—	Fountain with sculpture	—	
	Plough Lane Landmark Wimbledon F.C.	Junction of Plough Lane and Dunsford Road	2009	Sam Burford	—	Memorial	—	
	arthur (stag)	Outside Wimbledon station 51.4212°N 0.2071°W	2012	Isabelle Zhizhi Southwood	—	Sculpture	—	Unveiled 21 June 2012.
	Statue of Sister Nivedita	Outside Ricards Lodge High School, Lake Road 51.4286°N 0.2042°W	2023	Nirjan De and Sarada Sarkar	—	Statue	—	

== See also ==
- Bust of Haile Selassie in Cannizaro Park, Wimbledon (destroyed in 2020)

== Bibliography ==
- Lloyd, Fran; Potkin, Helen; Thackara, Davina (2011). Public Sculpture of Outer South and West London. Public Sculpture of Britain. Liverpool: Liverpool University Press.
- Matthews, Peter (2018). London's Statues and Monuments. Oxford: Shire Publications.
