= Gimpel Fils =

Coordinates: 51.5117°N 0.1477°W

Gimpel Fils is a London art gallery formerly located at 30 Davies Street in Westminster, near Grosvenor Square. The gallery was founded by Charles and Peter Gimpel, sons of the Parisian art dealer René Gimpel, author of the Diary of an Art Dealer. Throughout its history it has maintained a commitment to contemporary British and International art.

== History ==
Gimpel Fils was founded in November 1946. The first exhibition, Five Centuries of French Painting, was based on the small part of René Gimpel's collection that had been sent to London before the Second World War. The bulk of his stock was lost in Paris.

During the 1950s and 1960s, Gimpel Fils was associated with the avant-garde. It supported modern British artists, including those of the St Ives School, as well as rising American artists and French abstract painters of the School of Paris. Gimpel Fils represented many of the major artists of the time, including Barbara Hepworth and Ben Nicholson. Nicholson moved to Gimpel Fils from the Lefevre Gallery and stayed until the early 1960s. During this period, the gallery gave first exhibitions to Lynn Chadwick, Anthony Caro, Hubert Dalwood, Peter Lanyon and Alan Davie, and was also associated with a number of other British artists, including Louis le Brocquy, Ivon Hitchens, Gillian Ayres, Bernard Meadows, Kenneth Armitage and Robert Adams. Gimpel Fils represented French artists including Marie Laurencin, Pierre Soulages, Nicolas de Staël, Serge Poliakoff, Fahrelnissa Zeid and Yves Klein, and worked with American artists including Marcel Duchamp, Alexander Calder, Willem de Kooning, Sam Francis, and Larry Rivers, who had his first London exhibition at the gallery in 1962. An obituary of Peter Gimpel in The Independent newspaper suggested that: "Despite the rise of Marlborough Fine Art and stiff competition from the likes of the Redfern, Waddington and Hanover galleries, Gimpel Fils was for a time unrivaled in the range and quality of its artists."

The gallery continues to promote the work of that generation of artists, supporting the work of senior British painters such as Alan Davie and Albert Irvin, while also presenting retrospectives of 20th-century modern art. The contemporary programme has widened the range of work shown by the gallery and has developed to include artists such as Corinne Day, Andres Serrano, Callum Morton and Hannah Maybank.

Gimpel Fils was initially based, briefly, at 86 Duke Street, London, before moving to 50 South Molton Street, where the artist Louis Le Brocquy laid a mosaic in the entrance. It relocated to its present premises at 30 Davies Street in 1972. The gallery was refurbished in 2000. The refurbishment was inaugurated with an installation by Richard Wilson.

The Gimpel family retained a strong interest in the running of the gallery. The current co-director is René Gimpel, son of Charles and a fourth generation of the Gimpel family to become an art dealer.
