= Lynn Chadwick =

English artist and sculptor (1914–2003)

Lynn Russell Chadwick
- Born: 24 November 1914; Barnes, London, England
- Died: 25 April 2003 (aged 88); Lypiatt Park, Gloucestershire, England
- Education: London
- Known for: Sculpture, drawing
- Movement: Modernism, Geometry of Fear
- Awards: CBE

Lynn Russell Chadwick, CBE RA (24 November 1914 – 25 April 2003) was an English sculptor and artist. Much of his work is semi-abstract sculpture in bronze or steel. His work is in the collections of MoMA in New York, the Tate in London and the Centre Georges Pompidou in Paris.

== Early life and education ==
Chadwick was born in the suburb of Barnes, in western London, and attended Merchant Taylors' School in Northwood. While there he expressed an interest in being an artist, though his art master suggested architecture was a more realistic option. Accordingly, Chadwick became a trainee draughtsman, working first at the offices of architects Donald Hamilton and then Eugen Carl Kauffman, and finally for Rodney Thomas. Chadwick took great inspiration from Thomas, whose interest in contemporary European architecture and design had a significant effect on his development. His training in architectural drawing was the only formal education he received as an artist. He recalled: "What it taught me was how to compose things, a formal exercise in composition, really, it has nothing to do with the building it represents".

== War service ==
In April 1941, having previously been a conscientious objector, Chadwick volunteered to serve in the Fleet Air Arm, and in 1941–1944 he served as a pilot during the Second World War escorting Atlantic convoys.

== Beginnings as a sculptor ==
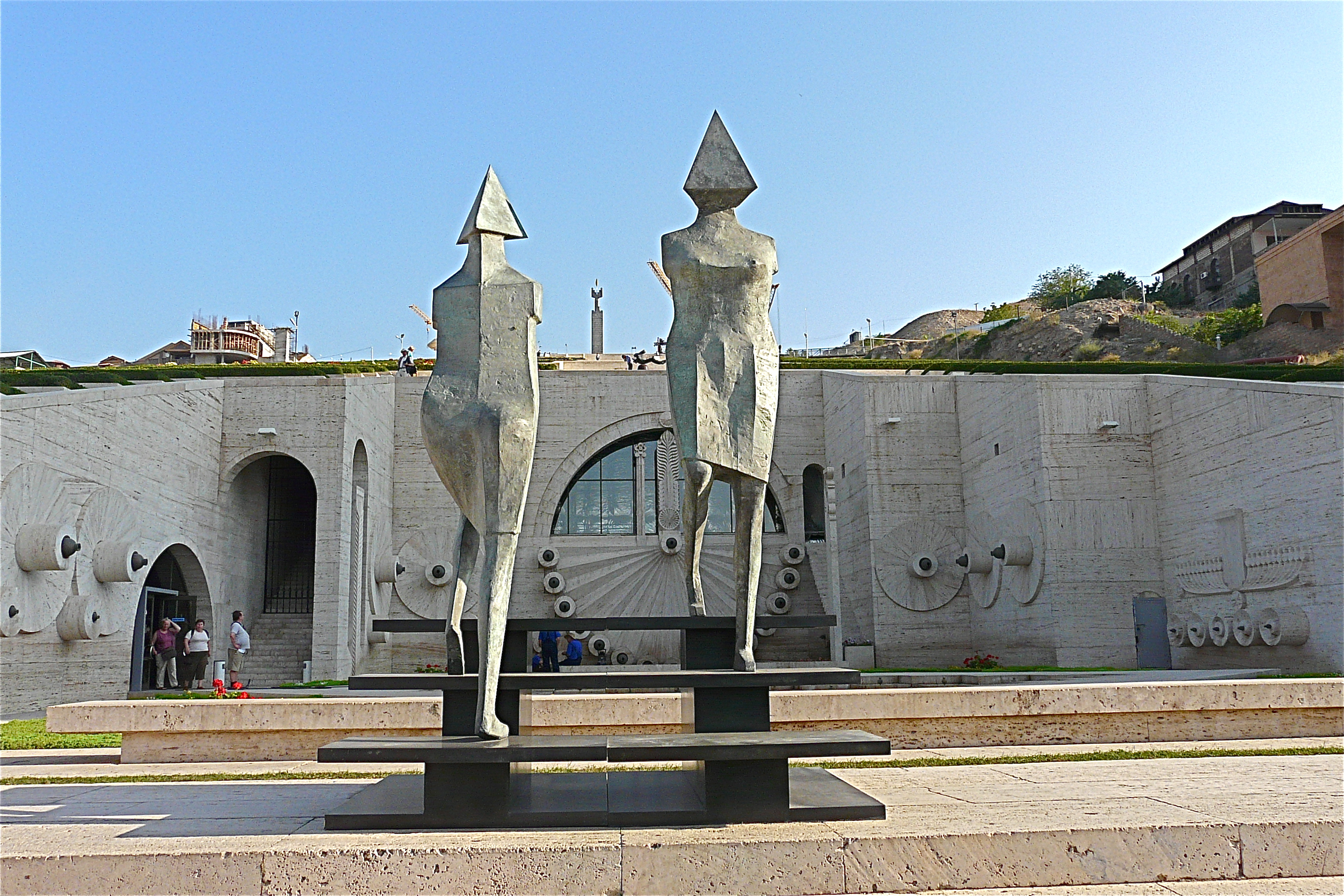
Sculpture on the steps of the Yerevan Cascade

After the war, Chadwick returned to Rodney Thomas where he became involved in the design of trade-fair stands.

In March 1946, he won a £50 prize in a textile design competition, which led to a contract to produce more designs for Zika Ascher and Lida Ascher who had promoted the 's' removed competition and who owned a textile design firm. Around the same time, Chadwick was commissioned to make exhibition stands for the Aluminium Development Corporation.

Chadwick constructed his first mobile around 1947 – which originated from ideas first proposed by Rodney Thomas. Very few of these works survive; they were made of wire, balsa wood and cut copper and brass shapes, often fish-like and sometimes coloured. Some were incorporated as decorative features in exhibition stands, while others found homes amongst Thomas and his circle. Later he developed ground supports for the mobiles, transforming them into what he called "stabiles". At the same time, he was designing fabrics and furniture.

Recalling this period, Chadwick said:

I actually wanted to produce a sort of touchable object, a tangible object. I really wanted to do that rather than be involved with intangible things like architecture which was slightly intangible to me because it had meant, in my case, drawing after drawing after drawing for projects which were never realised. In my case, I wanted to do it to have some reality in front of me.

== Lypiatt Park ==
Desiring a better family life and more room to work, Chadwick left London in 1947, eventually settling in the hamlet of Upper Coberley, near Cheltenham. Here he converted outbuildings into a working studio in which he worked on his designs and his first sculptures.

In September 1958, Chadwick bought Lypiatt Park, an historic manor house in Gloucestershire. The building is Neo-Gothic in style, with outbuildings and extensions having been added to the house both in 1800 and in 1870. "This place was the same price as a three-bedroom house ... and nobody wanted it, so ... I borrowed the money and came here. It was sort of wonderful, making another room habitable every year". He set up a studio in the medieval chapel where he installed the blacksmith's anvil. Chadwick made it his project to restore the house and garden. In 1986 he purchased the surrounding land in Toadsmoor Valley and began to place his work there.

== Art career ==
In August 1949 one of Chadwick's small mobiles was placed in the window of Gimpel Fils, which promoted modern British art. The following year, he held his first one-man show there, which led to critical attention and several major commissions: two for the 1951 Festival of Britain complex, Tower and Cypress, and one, Green Finger, for the Battersea Park Open Air Sculpture Exhibition that year

In spring 1950, British architects, artists and designers were making plans for the celebrations surrounding the 1951 Festival of Britain. Jane Drew commissioned Chadwick to make a large-scale hanging mobile for the tower of her Riverside Restaurant on London's South Bank site, Tower Mobile. Architect Misha Black then commissioned Chadwick to make a large fixed sculpture for the garden of the Regatta Restaurant, Stabile (Cypress), made from copper sheets and brass rods. This work was significant in that it demonstrated Chadwick's transition from designer to sculptor.

In April 1951 Chadwick received a commission from the Arts Council of Great Britain for a large sculpture, The Fisheater, also for the Festival of Britain. This was exhibited at the Tate Gallery from autumn 1951 through most of 1952.

Working on this larger scale, Chadwick quickly became aware that he would need to learn the techniques required for welding iron, steel, brass and copper, so in the summer of 1950 he enrolled in a welding course at the British Oxygen Company's Welding School at Cricklewood, north London. Chadwick felt that this would solve the problem of creating large pieces suitable for public arenas.

In March 1951 he was invited to exhibit with the American Abstract Artists Group in New York.

In January 1952 Chadwick was asked to present to the selection committee of the XXVI Venice Biennale, resulting in his being one of eight young British sculptors who were invited to exhibit at the Biennale, including Robert Adams, Kenneth Armitage, Reg Butler, Geoffrey Clarke, Bernard Meadows, Eduardo Paolozzi and William Turnbull. The critical response was extremely positive. The poet and art critic Sir Herbert Read wrote the introduction to the catalogue for this show, called New Aspects of British Sculpture. He described Chadwick's work, in what was to become a long-held interpretation, situating it alongside quotes from T. S. Eliot's The Waste Land against the backdrop of the Cold War:

These new images belong to the iconography of despair, of defiance; and the more innocent the artist, the more effectively he transmits the collective guilt. Here are images of flight, of ragged claws 'scuttling across the floors of silent seas', of excoriated flesh, frustrated sex, the geometry of fear.

The success of the Biennale enormously enhanced Chadwick's reputation. Kenneth Armitage recalled that he swiftly transformed from a virtually unknown artist to an international name.

Chadwick did not go to art school and had no formal training as a sculptor. Transferring his experience as an architectural draughtsman through to his sculptural technique, he began to weld in a unique and innovative way. He had started to develop a technique that fused solid form with the plastic energy of his earlier works, creating an "armature" of welded steel rods and a method of composition that played on the expressive potential of the framework and "skeletons" of his figures, while also constructing a firm, tactile "body". Chadwick built his sculptures using geometric space frames, to which he referred as "drawing in steel rods". He produced sculptures in iron, bronze and steel, which developed from mobiles to insect forms, animal forms and groups of male and female figures.

In 1954 Chadwick discovered and began to use the medium of "Stolit", an industrial stone compound of gypsum and iron filings which could be applied wet before setting, and when dry, chased to achieve the surface Chadwick desired – sometimes textured, sometimes smooth. He did not use clay or other modelling materials. The discovery of his new technique would prove to be a turning point in Chadwick's working method.

In the late 1950s he started to cast in bronze. For a long time Chadwick was the sole technical force in the production of his work. It was not until 1971 that he opened a foundry at Lypiatt to cast jewellery and small bronzes.

== Venice Biennale 1956 ==
In 1956, Chadwick was chosen by the British Council as one of the lead sculptors to represent Britain at the XXVIII Venice Biennale. He was awarded the International Sculpture Prize, becoming the surprise winner and surpassing the favourite Alberto Giacometti, as well as César Baldaccini and Germaine Richier, and making him the youngest ever recipient of the prize. Following this critical esteem, Chadwick was talked of as the natural successor to Henry Moore as Britain's leading sculptor and artistic ambassador.

Following the Biennale, this exhibition toured Vienna, Munich, Paris, Amsterdam and Brussels before arriving in London. In May 1957. Chadwick's first solo show in the United States took place at Saidenberg Gallery. Also in 1957, the Air League of the British Empire commissioned him to make a sculpture to commemorate the round trip flight across the Atlantic Ocean by the Airship R34 in 1919. Chadwick made a maquette, but complaints about the work caused the commission to be dropped.

Chadwick is featured in the 1964 documentary film 5 British Sculptors (Work and Talk) by American film maker Warren Forma. Many of Chadwick's prints have been on exhibit at Tate Britain, London.

== Later years ==
During the 1960s, Chadwick's work, which had been situated by critics within the aesthetic of post-war sensibility, fell victim to changing fashions during the rise of Pop Art. However, he continued to receive a steady flow of public commissions and private sales – particularly in Italy, Denmark and Belgium. Chadwick was invited to participate in the Sculpture in the City exhibition at the fourth Festival of Two Worlds at Spoleto, Italy in July 1962, to create a large outdoor sculpture alongside nine other sculptors including David Smith and Alexander Calder. The result was Two Winged Figures 1962, his first steel sculpture, which was made at the Italsider steel works in Genoa. Chadwick and Smith became good friends during this period, and remained so until Smith's early death in 1965.

In a catalogue essay on an exhibition of Chadwick's sculptures and drawings at the Museum of Modern Art in Rio de Janeiro in January 1962, Herbert Read noted that Chadwick has consolidated his style and subject matter since winning the 1956 Sculpture Prize at Venice, saying "He is still preoccupied with states of attention or alertness in the human figure or the animal. His aim is to incorporate a moment of maximum intensity, and this he does by the most direct means – the reduction of bodily attitudes to their magnetic lines of force"

During the 1960s, Chadwick began to work in a more abstract style, producing works such as King (1964), which were influenced by Easter Island figures (moai), as well as a series of colourful "Pyramid" and "Split" sculptures – clean geometrical shapes made from Formica on wood. He also continued to create abstract human forms; male figures generally had blocky rectangular heads (as seen in 1960 piece The Watchers), while females had heads formed of more delicate diamonds or pyramids.

By the end of the 1960s, Chadwick was working with complex groups of figures, notably the "Elektra" series. He also introduced polished facets to his bronze works, which would accentuate some part of the figure's anatomy, such as Three Elektras.

Around 1968, Chadwick created works that used a matt patina over some of the bronze, but with faces or chests burnished to a high golden sheen, a technique already seen in works of sculptors including Armitage. This method appeared in Chadwick's Elektras and according to Chadwick stemmed from his desire 'to get a bit of contrast and colour'.

The long series of standing, sitting, and reclining couples on which Chadwick worked between 1968 and 1990 offer infinitesimal adjustments in the male and female figures' relation to each other—the elusive "attitude" which, for Chadwick, was a sculpture's whole expressive point.

In 1973 Chadwick had begun to clothe his figures in pleated drapery – figures often were winged, with billowing cloaks, such as in Pair of Walking Figures – Jubilee 1977. This continued in the 1980s, where works such as High Wind exaggerated the effects of wind. Clothed sitting couples also began to appear on benches, as Chadwick began to explore how far he could push his method towards naturalism.

In 1985, he was created Officier [of the] Ordre des Arts et des Lettres, for which he would later become Commandeur des Arts et des Lettres in 1993. In 1988, he was appointed the Order of Andrés Bello – First Class, Venezuela

Chadwick returned to working with steel for the first time since 1962 in 1989. Using this method, Chadwick produced a series of "beasts", which varied in size and were often monumental. These works in welded stainless-steel sheets would come to be the final stage of Chadwick's development of his unique technique. The series began with Rising Beast (1989), with titles that allude to specific primal states of action: Beast Alerted I (1990); Howling Beast I (1990); and Crouching Beast I (1990). Chadwick is said to have delighted in the properties that steel afforded; no matter how dull the weather some facet of the sculptures would catch and reflect the light.

Chadwick was invited back to the Venice Biennale that same year, for which he created two monumental figures, playfully entitled Back To Venice, 1988. Also in 1988, he was made an Honorary Fellow of Bath Spa University College, Bath.

In 1991, he introduced the motif of a pair of female figures climbing and descending short flights of stairs, captured in contrary motion. This motif would also be combined with a single High Wind figure. The next year, in 1992, Chadwick was given his first British retrospective at the Yorkshire Sculpture Park.

In 1995, he stopped working, claiming "There are only so many things to say and only so many ways to say them and I've done that now."

Chadwick was appointed a Senior Royal Academician of the Royal Academy of Arts, London, in 2001.

Chadwick died at Lypiatt Park in 2003, the same year in which he was given a major retrospective exhibition at Tate Britain. He is buried in amongst the pine trees near the seat where he used to sit and think, overlooking Toadsmoor Valley. He is survived by his wife Éva and his two sons and two daughters.

In 2014, the centenary of his birth, a catalogue raisonné and a biography were published, four of his sculptures were shown in the Annenberg courtyard of the Royal Academy in London, and BlainSouthern staged exhibitions of his work in their commercial galleries in Berlin, London and New York.

== Personal life ==
In 1942 Chadwick married Ann Secord with whom he had one son, Simon. In 1959 he married Frances Jamieson (d. 1964) and had two daughters with her, Sarah and Sophie. In June 1965 he married Éva Reiner and together they had one son, Daniel. Éva, who had come to Britain as a refugee from Budapest, would remain his constant companion, as well as a chronicler and cataloguer of his work.

== Awards and recognition ==
- 1953 Honourable mention and prize, Unknown Political Prisoner international sculpture competition
- 1956 International prize for sculpture at the Venice Biennale
- 1964 Commander of the Order of the British Empire
- 1985 French Officier de l'Ordre des Arts et des Lettres
- 2001 Royal Academician, UK

== Public collections ==
Chadwick's work features in the collections of major institutions and galleries around the world, including:

- Albright-Knox Art Gallery, Buffalo, New York, US Albright-Knox Art Gallery, Buffalo, New York, US
- Art Gallery of Ontario, Toronto, Ontario, Canada
- Art Institute of Chicago, Chicago, Illinois, US
- Arts Council of Great Britain, London, UK
- British Council, London, UK
- Contemporary Art Society, London, UK
- Frederik Meijer Gardens & Sculpture Park, Grand Rapids, Michigan, US
- Hakone Open-Air Museum, Hakone, Japan
- Hirshhorn Museum and Sculpture Garden, Smithsonian Institution, Washington DC, US
- Irish Museum of Modern Art, Dublin, Ireland
- Israel Museum, Jerusalem, Israel
- Louisiana Museum of Modern Art, Humblebaek, Denmark
- Montreal Museum of Fine Arts, Montreal, Quebec, Canada
- Musée Rodin, Paris, France
- Royal Museums of Fine Arts of Belgium, Brussels, Belgium
- Museum Boymans-van Beuningen, Rotterdam, Netherlands
- Museum of Modern Art, New York, US
- Nasjonalgalleriet, Oslo, Norway
- National Galleries of Scotland, Edinburgh, UK
- National Museum of Wales, Cardiff, UK
- Nordjyllands Kunstmuseum, Aalborg, Denmark
- Peggy Guggenheim Collection, Venice, Italy
- Philadelphia Museum of Art, Philadelphia, Pennsylvania, US
- Philip and Muriel Berman Museum of Art, Collegeville, PA
- Robert and Lisa Sainsbury Collection, University of East Anglia, Norwich, UK
- Royal Academy of Arts, London, UK
- San Diego Museum of Art, San Diego, US
- South African National Gallery, Cape Town, South Africa
- Tate Gallery, London, UK
- Tel Aviv Museum, Tel Aviv, Israel
- University of Michigan Museum of Art, Ann Arbor, Michigan, US
- Yorkshire Sculpture Park, Wakefield, UK
- Museum de Fundatie, Zwolle, The Netherlands

== Gallery ==
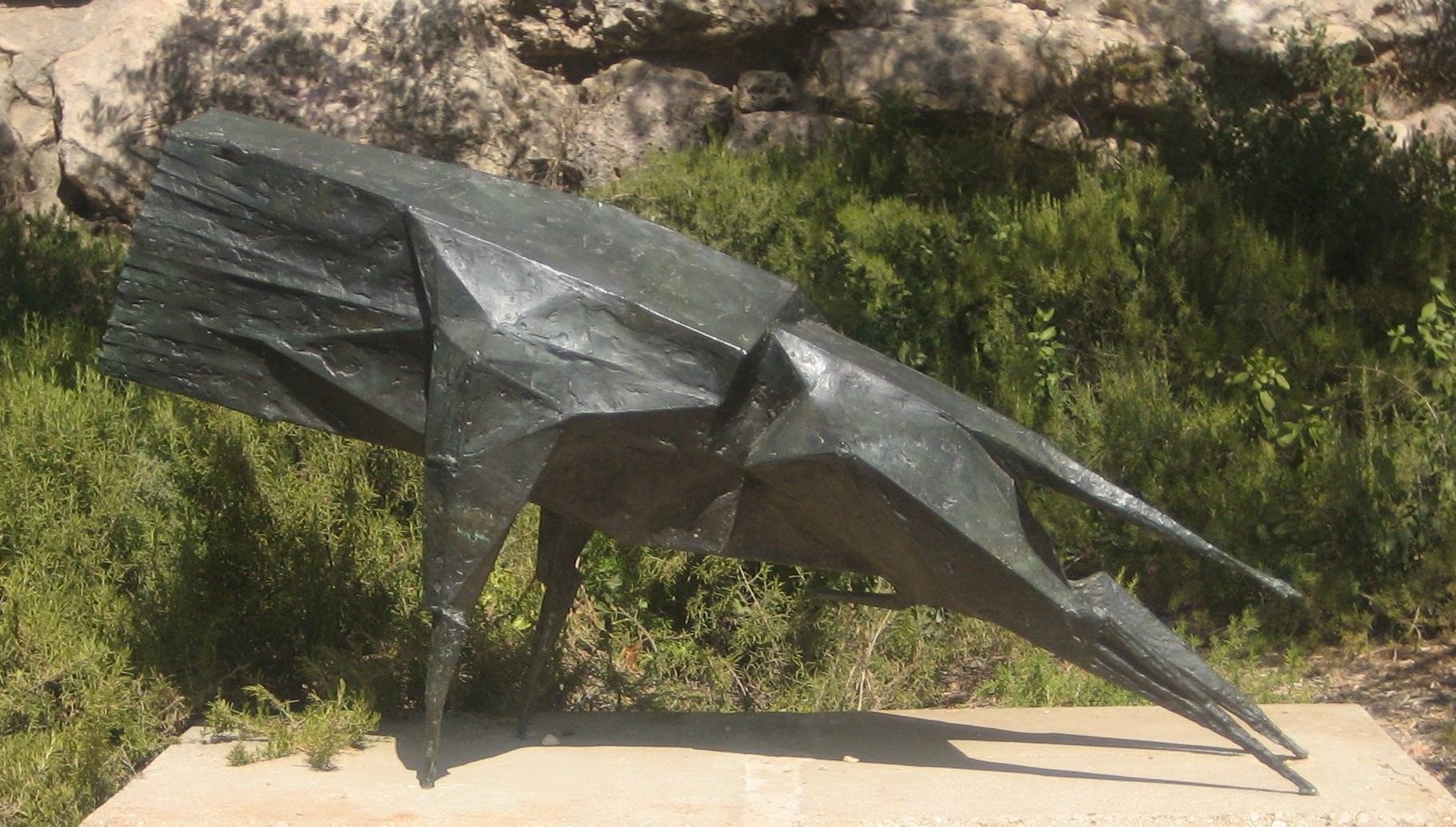
'Roaring Lion', bronze sculpture, 1960, Israel Museum, Jerusalem, Israel

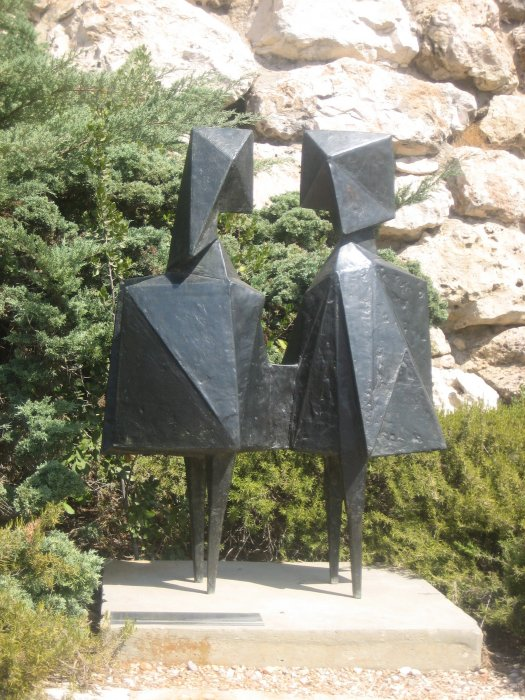
Two Figures (Conjunction XV), bronze sculpture, 1970, Israel Museum, Jerusalem, Israel

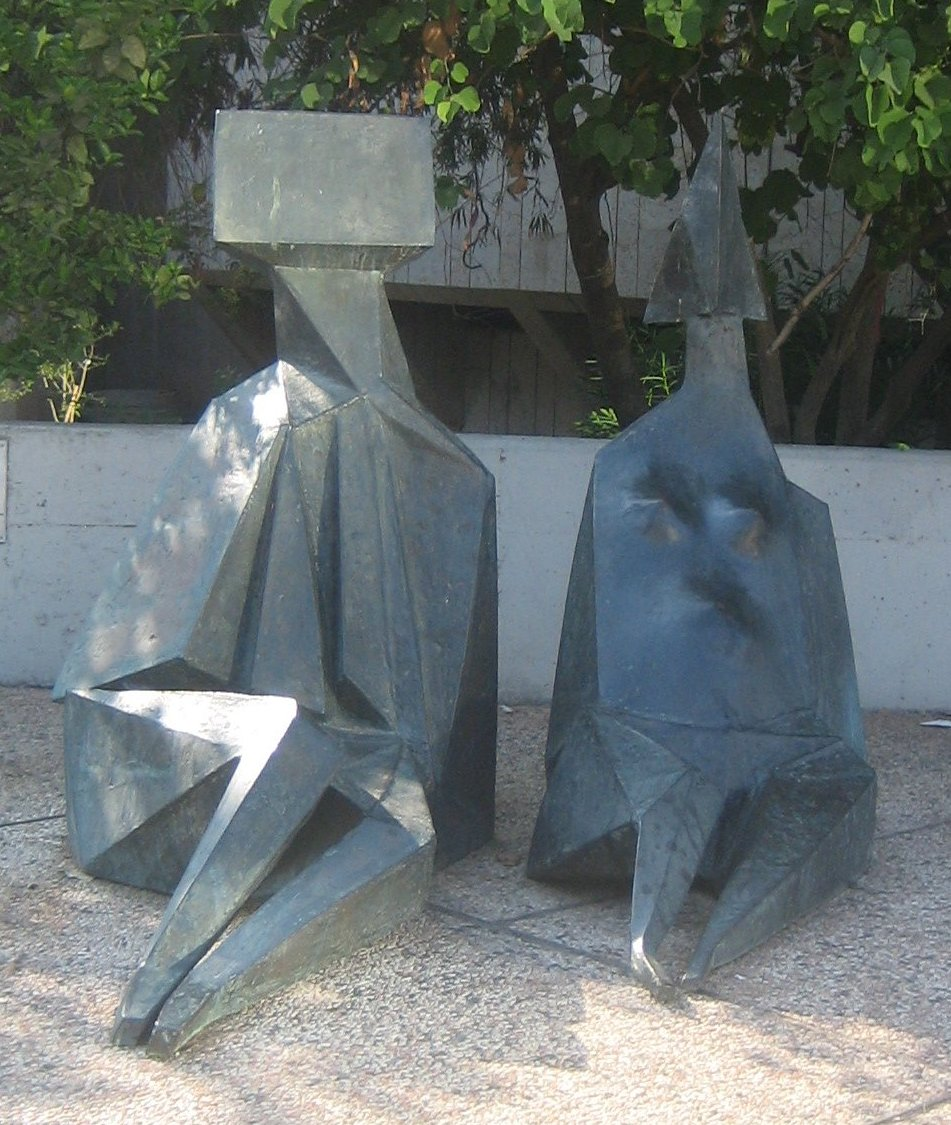
'Two Seated Figures', bronze sculpture, 1973, Tel Aviv Museum of Art, Tel Aviv, Israel

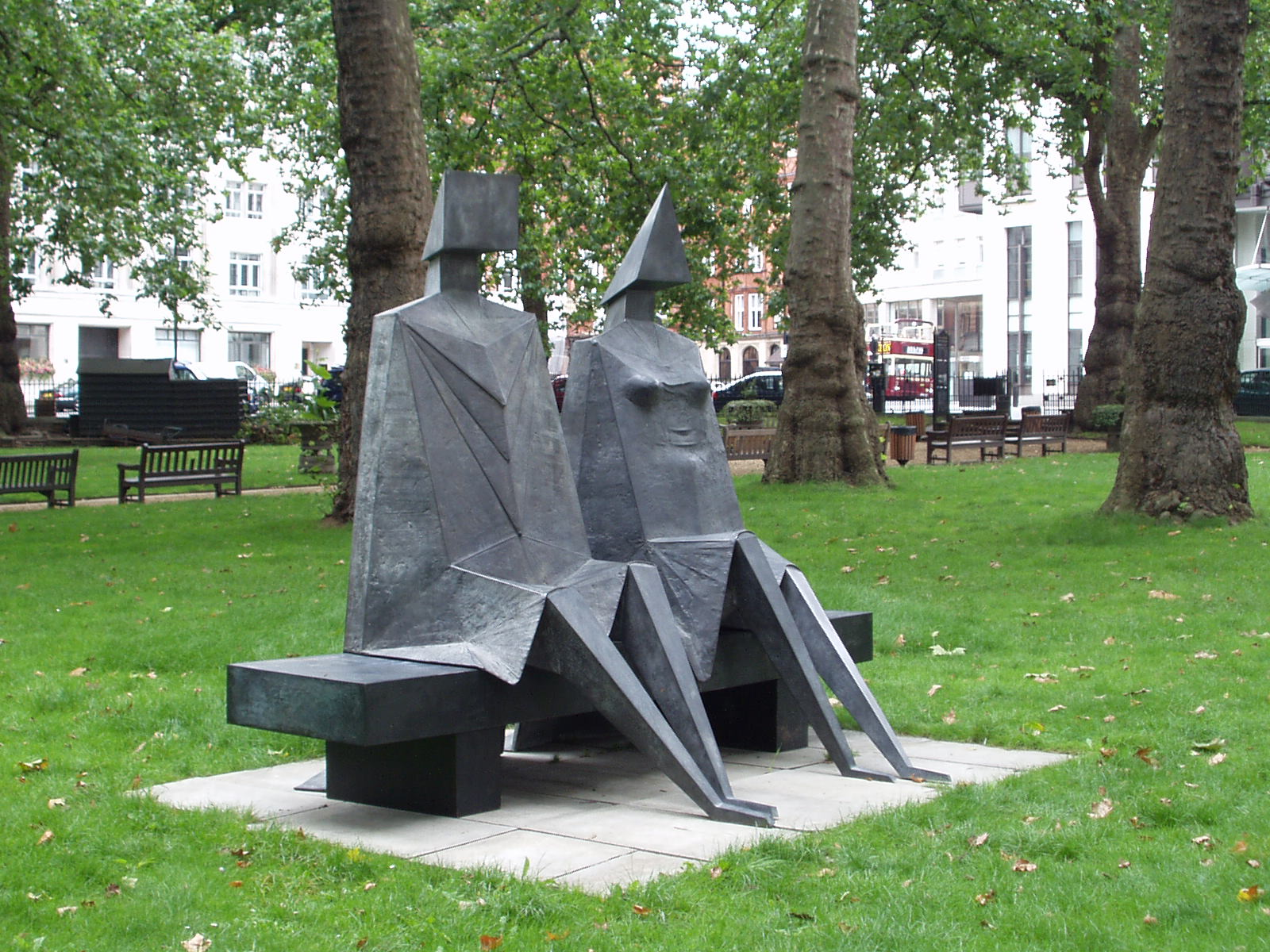
Sculpture Sitting Couple by Lynn Chadwick, Berkeley Square, London W1/UK

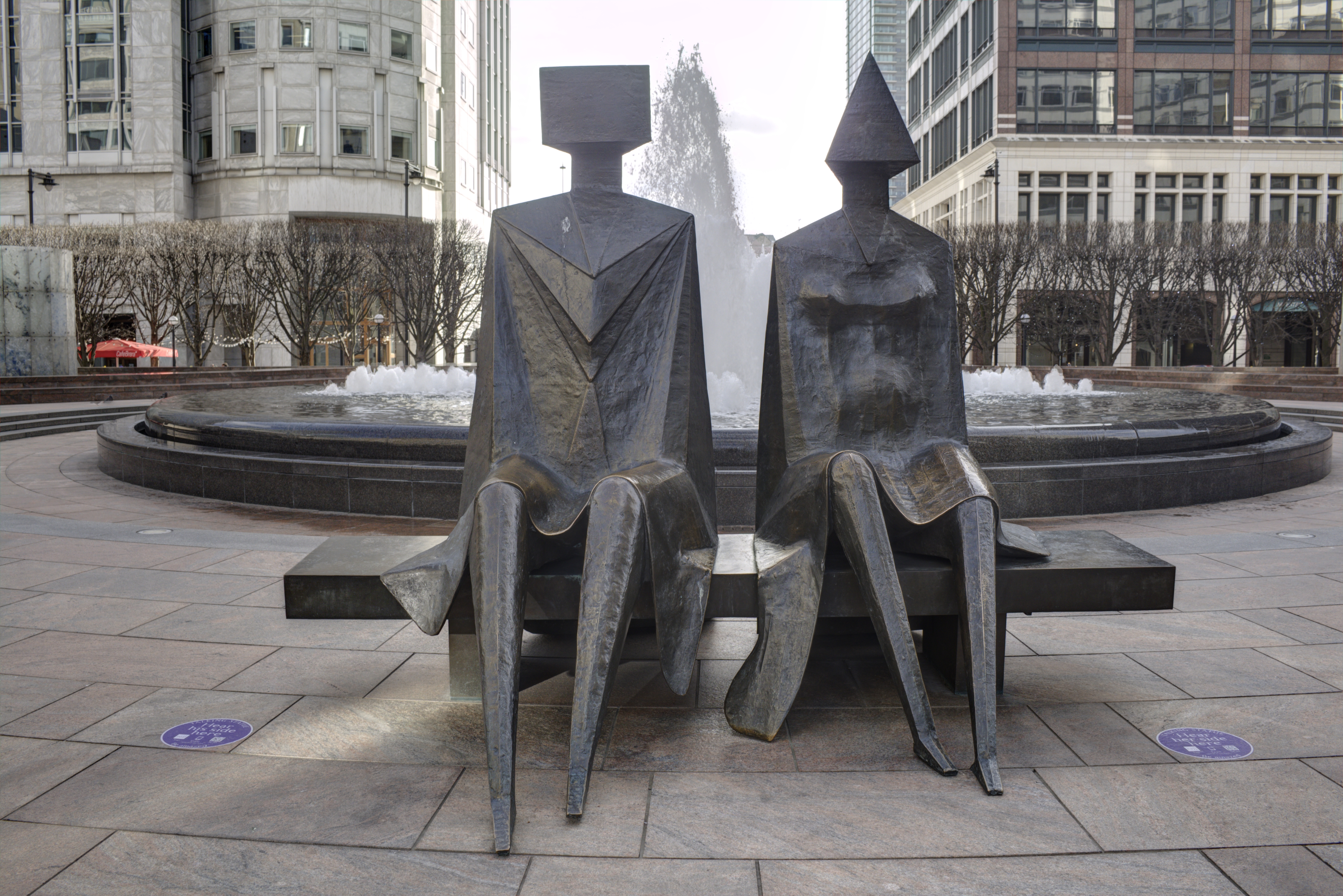
'Couple on Seat', bronze sculpture, 1984, Cabot Square, Canary Wharf, London, Great Britain

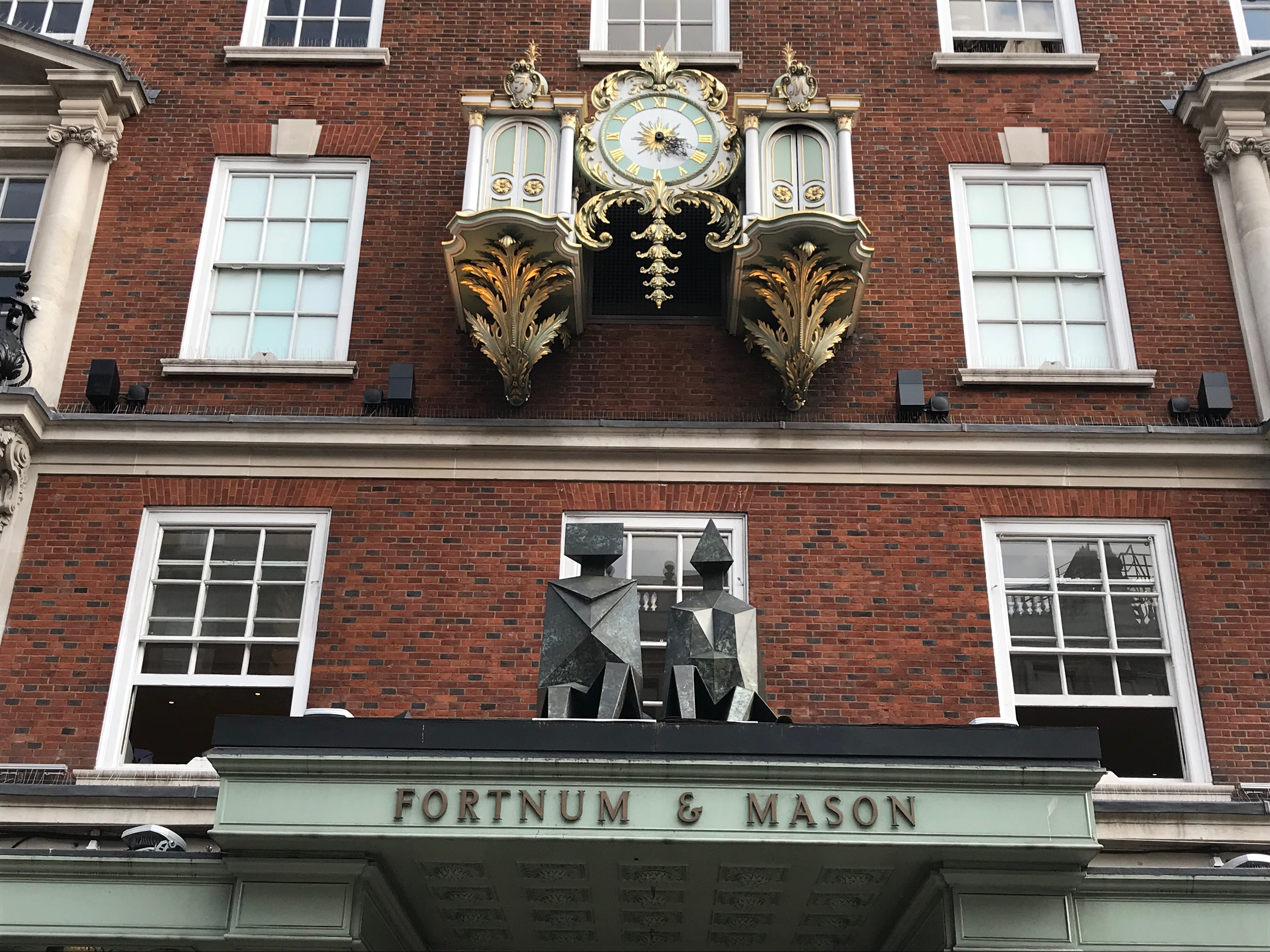
Lynn Chadwick, ‘King and Queen’, 1990, Bronze. Sited above the entrance to Fortnum and Mason, Piccadilly, London.

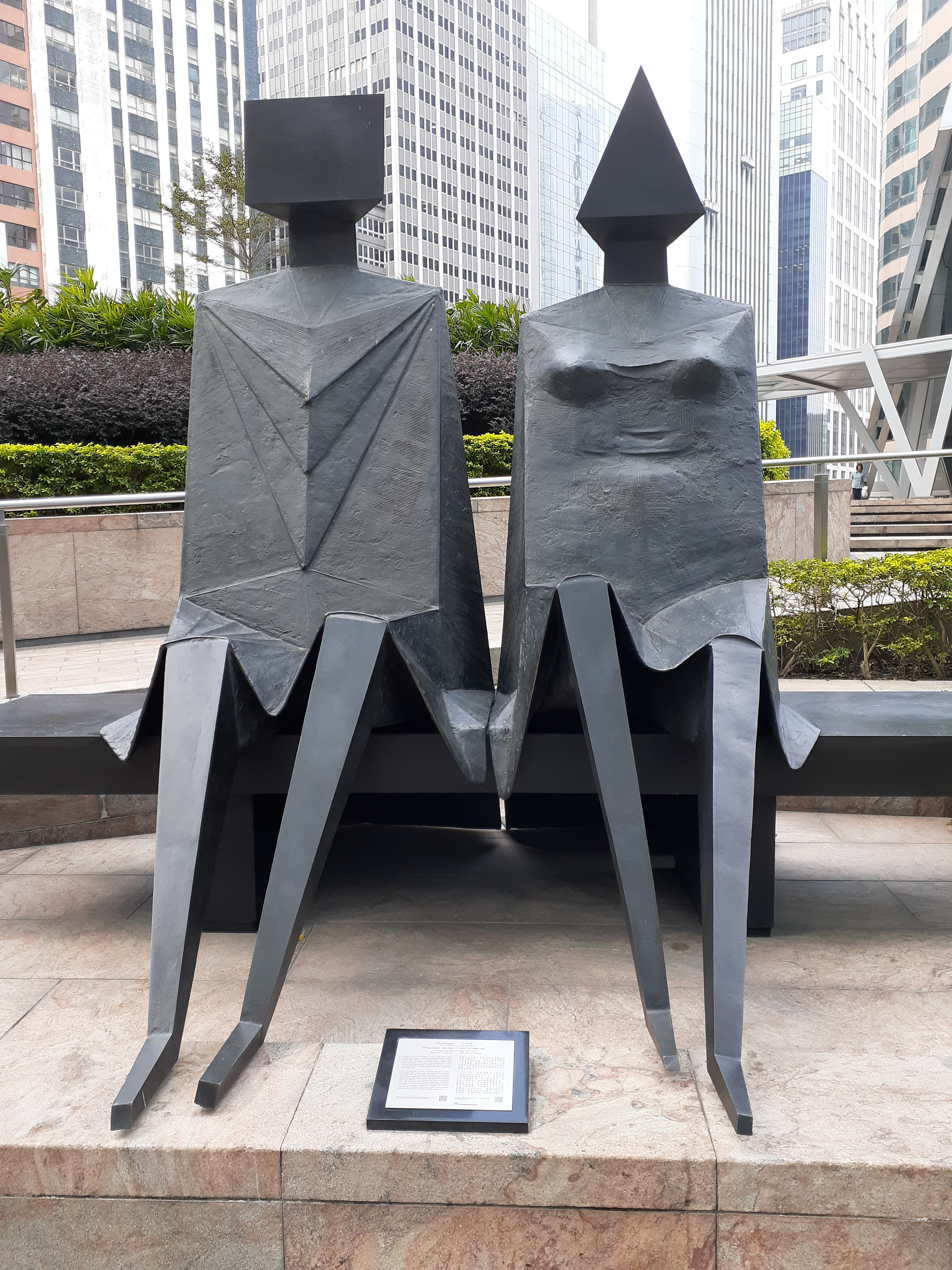
’Sitting Couple’, 1989–1990, Bronze, by Lynn Chadwick, Exchange Square (Hong Kong)

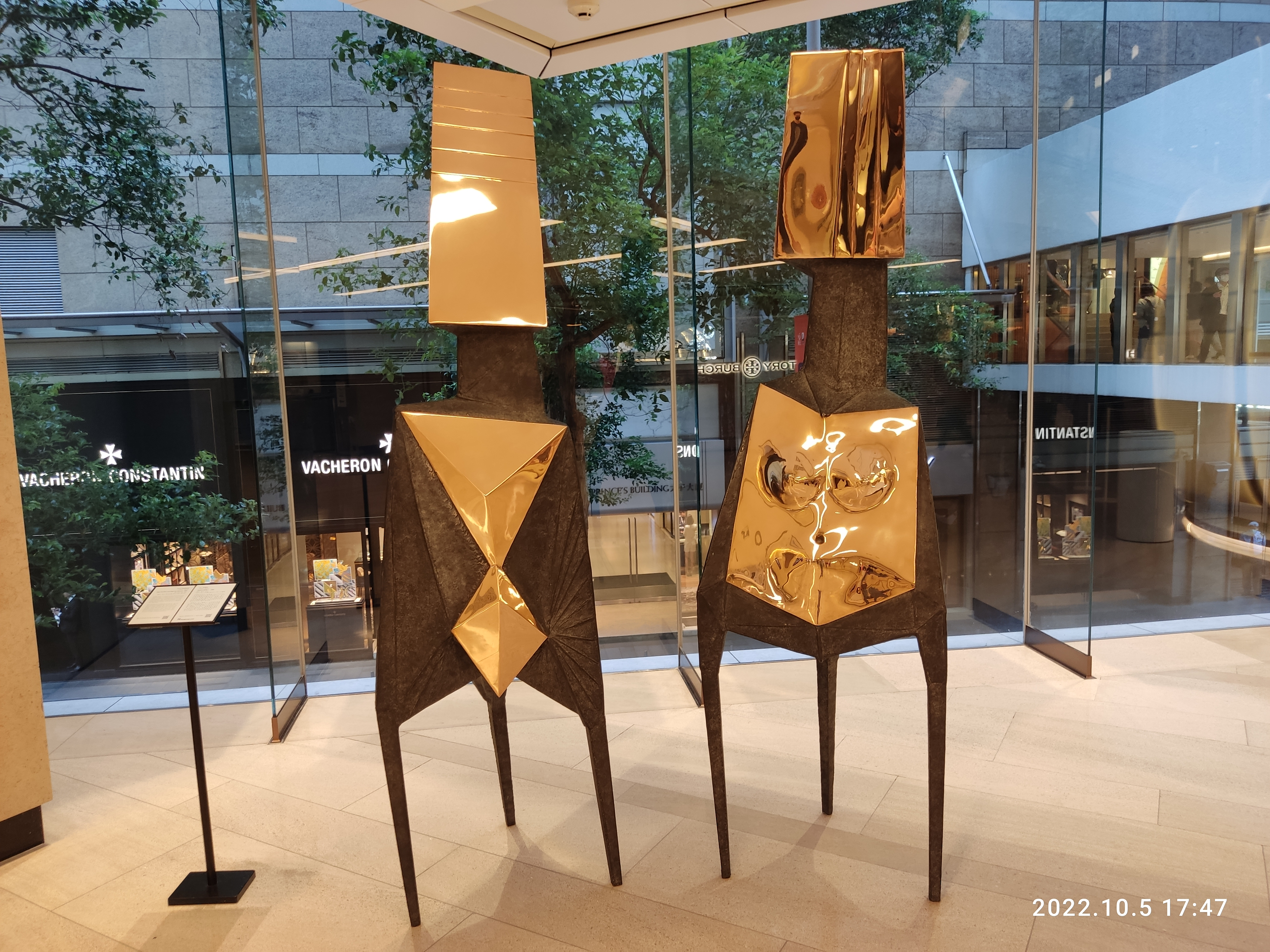
’High Hat Man and High Hat Woman’, 1968, Bronze, by Lynn Chadwick. Alexandra House, Central, Hong Kong
