= Saint Martin's School of Art =

Former art college in London, England

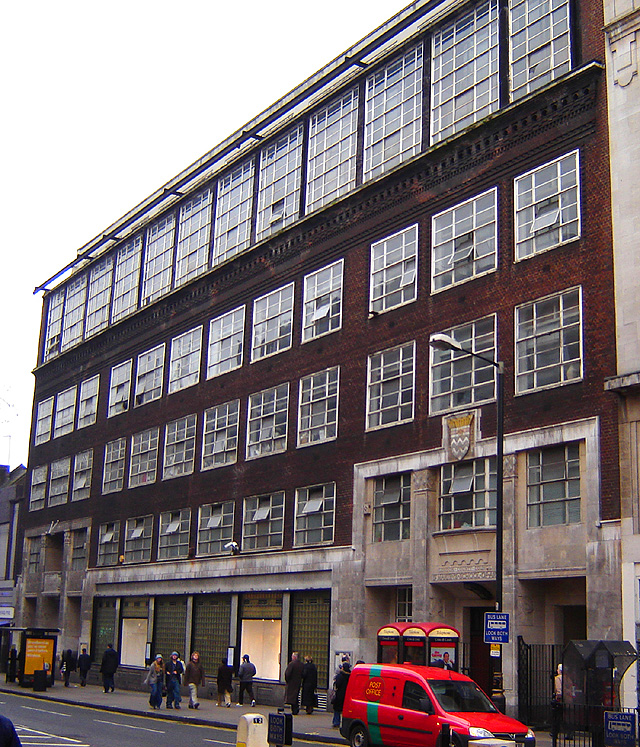
- The former Saint Martin's School of Art building, in Charing Cross Road, 2006
- Type: Academy of art and design
- Active: 1854–1989
- Location: London, United Kingdom; 51.5142°N 0.1299°W
- Campus: 107–109 Charing Cross Road

Saint Martin's School of Art was an art college in London, England. It offered foundation and degree level courses. It was established in 1854, initially under the aegis of the church of St Martin-in-the-Fields. Saint Martin's became part of the London Institute in 1986, and in 1989 merged with the Central School of Art and Design to form Central Saint Martins College of Art and Design.

== History ==
Saint Martin's School of Art was established in 1854 by Henry Mackenzie, vicar of the church of St Martin-in-the-Fields. It became independent from the church in 1859.

The school was at first housed on the top floor of St Martin's Northern School in Shelton Street (then called Castle Street), to the north of Long Acre.

The Gilbert-Garret Competition for Sketching Clubs was founded at Saint Martin's in 1870, when John Parker was headmaster. It was named after Sir John Gilbert, the first president of the school.

From 1952 to 1979 Frank Martin was head of the sculpture department of Saint Martin's. He brought in young sculptors such as Anthony Caro, Robert Clatworthy, Elisabeth Frink and Eduardo Paolozzi to teach, and also employed as part-time teachers recent graduates of the department, including David Annesley, Michael Bolus, Phillip King, Tim Scott, Bill Tucker and Isaac Witkin. Caro's influence was particularly strong, and the group around him came to be known as the New Generation of British sculptors. The sculpture department became, in the words of Tim Scott: "the most famous in the art world".

The first public performance of the Sex Pistols took place at the school on 6 November 1975; they were the support band for a group called Bazooka Joe.

Saint Martin's became part of the London Institute in 1986, and in 1989 merged with the Central School of Art and Design to form Central Saint Martins College of Art and Design.

Foyles bookstore moved into the college's former building at 107 Charing Cross Road in 2014.

== Alumni ==
Alumni of the school include:

- Sade Adu
- Pierce Brosnan
- Peter Doig
- John Galliano
- Bill Gibb
- Gilbert and George
- Anthony Gormley
- Katharine Hamnett
- Richard Long
- Bruce Oldfield
