= Lypiatt Park =

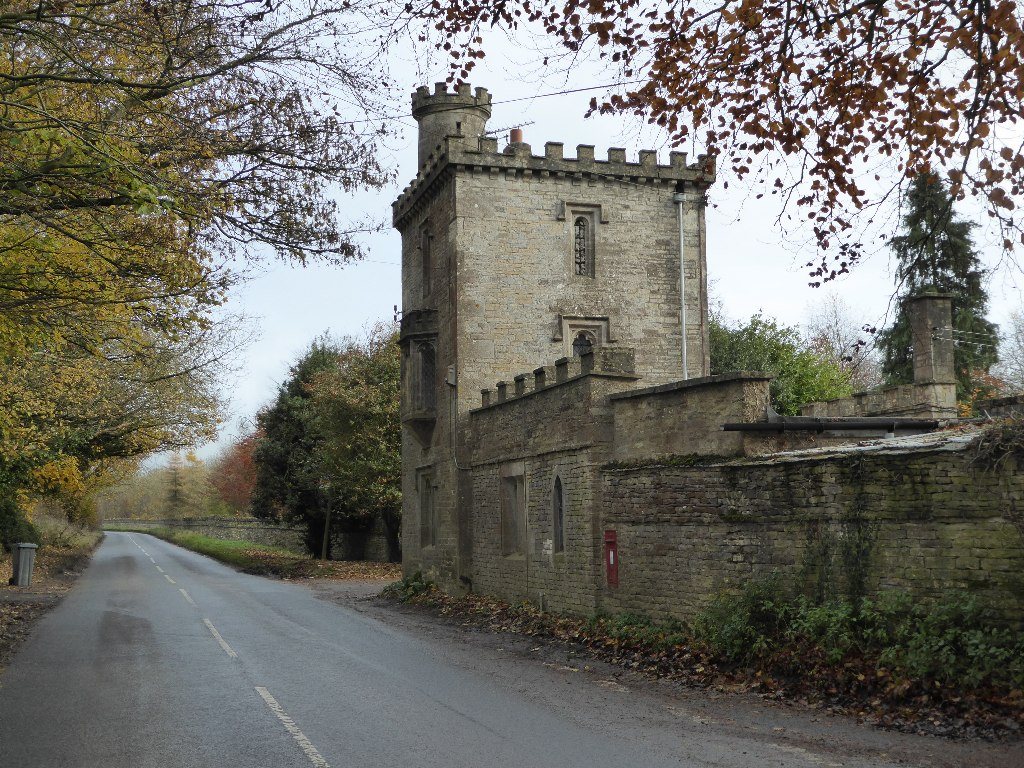
- The lodge at Lypiatt Park - the house is not visible from the road

- Location within Gloucestershire

General information
- Status: Grade I listed
- Type: Stately home
- Location: Gloucestershire, England
- Coordinates: 51.7513°N 2.1666°W
- Construction started: 1220

Lypiatt Park is a medieval and Tudor manor house with notable nineteenth-century additions in the parish of Bisley, near Stroud, in Gloucestershire, England. The grounds include a group of medieval outbuildings. It is a Grade I listed building.

== History and description ==
=== Early history ===
Lypiatt Park was the manor house of Over Lypiatt, first recorded in 1220. In 1324 the manor was a possession of the Maunsell family, who probably built the extant chapel. In 1395 Richard Whittington, Lord Mayor of London, acquired the manor in satisfaction of a debt.

An engraving by Johannes Kip for Sir Robert Atkyns' History of Glostershire of about 1710 illustrates the Tudor manor house, perhaps the house of Robert Wye, who owned the manor from c. 1505–44. The principal range contained a hall with service rooms to the east, and a three-bay parlour/solar block of living quarters to the west, with two irregular and incomplete courtyards. The northern court contained the chapel and the gatehouse (demolished). The chapel was altered in the early 16th century.

It was acquired by marriage and inheritance by John Throckmorton who was implicated in the Gunpowder Plot of 1605. In 1610 the house was bought by Thomas Stephens, whose descendants lived there for nearly 200 years. On 1 January 1645, the house was captured and burnt by Royalist troops evicting a Parliamentary garrison, but it was later repaired and reoccupied.

=== Nineteenth century ===
The house was sold in 1802 by Thomas Baghot-de la Bere, nephew of the last Stephens owner, to the local clothier and banker, Paul Wathen, who was High Sheriff of Gloucestershire in 1810 and knighted in 1812. He employed Jeffrey Wyattville to add a new range at the west end of the house in a picturesque neo-Tudor style.

Sir Paul Baghott was declared bankrupt in 1819, in the aftermath of the Napoleonic wars, when Lypiatt Park was sold in 1824 to William Lewis of Brimscombe, who made some further improvements.

In 1841, the house was sold to Samuel Baker, who commissioned the Gloucester architect, Samuel Daukes, to make minor alterations. In 1846, it was sold again, this time to J. E. Dorington, whose son Sir John Dorington, 1st Baronet expanded the estate and employed Thomas Henry Wyatt to make further major alterations to the house in the Gothic Revival style in 1876–77.

=== Twentieth century ===
The Lypiatt Park estate was broken up and sold in 1919. W.J. Gwyn bought the house and most of the estate, and settled there in the late 1920s with his sister and brother-in-law, Judge H.B.D. Woodcock. After the death of Gwyn and his sister, Judge Woodcock continued to live there with his daughter, Isla, until it was sold in 1951/2, when they moved to Jaynes Court, nearby. In 1959, by then in some disrepair, it was purchased by the Modernist British sculptor, Lynn Chadwick (1914–2003), whose expressionistic, figurative works in welded iron and bronze earned him international acclaim. Chadwick restored the house and died there on April 25, 2003, after which his heirs have put forward proposals to open to the public an area of the park in order create a permanent display for his sculpture collection. In 2018, Justin Hayward recounted that he wrote the Moody Blues hit Tuesday Afternoon on a Tuesday afternoon while visiting the park.

== Historic listing designations ==
Lypiatt Park is a Grade I listed building. A granary and a dovecote, both with medieval origins, also have Grade I listings.
