= Charles Gimpel =

Anglo-French photographer

Charles Gimpel (5 August 1913 Vaucresson – 26 January 1973 Cretingham, Suffolk) was an Anglo-French art dealer, gallerist, and photographer. He was the son of art dealer Rene Gimpel.
