= Bernard Meadows =

British sculptor

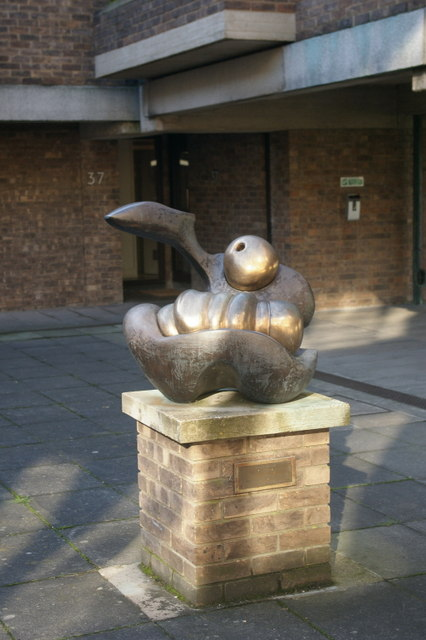
Pointing Figure with Child, 1966, on display at Churchill College, Cambridge

Bernard Meadows (19 February 1915 – 12 January 2005) was a British modernist sculptor. Meadows was Henry Moore's first assistant; then part of the Geometry of Fear school, a loose-knit group of British sculptors whose prominence was established at the 1952 Venice Biennale; a professor of sculpture at the Royal College of Art for 20 years; and returned to assist Moore again in his last years.

== Early life ==
Meadows was born in Norwich, and educated at the City of Norwich School, After briefly training as an accountant in 1931, he attended Norwich School of Art and then in 1936 became Henry Moore's first assistant at his studio then in Kent. He participated in the first Surrealist exhibition in London in 1936. He lived in Chalk Farm from 1937, assisting Moore in his new studio at Hampstead, and studied at the Royal College of Art (although his first application was rejected, due to his association with Moore) and at the Courtauld Institute.

In the Second World War, he initially registered as a conscientious objector, but when Nazi Germany invaded the USSR in 1941, he withdrew his objection. He was called up to the Royal Air Force and worked in air-sea rescue, serving for a time the Cocos Islands in the Indian Ocean, where he was inspired by the large crabs.

== Career ==
He returned to Moore's studio after the war, and helped Moore with his marble sculpture Three Standing Figures 1947 and his 1949 bronze Family Group.

He went on to find acclaim. An elm figure was exhibited in the open air sculpture exhibition at Battersea Park in 1951, alongside the Festival of Britain, which went to the Tate Gallery.

He exhibited in the British Pavilion at the Venice Biennale a year later, alongside a new generation of British sculptors, including Anthony Caro, Lynn Chadwick and Eduardo Paolozzi. Their angular artworks contrasted with the more rounded styles of their seniors, Henry Moore and Barbara Hepworth, and they were dubbed by art critic Herbert Read as the "Geometry of Fear".

He held his first solo exhibition at Gimpel Fils in 1957, with four more in the decade to 1967. He also exhibited at the São Paulo Biennale in 1957, Documenta 2 in Kassel in 1959, and the 1964 Venice Biennale. He exhibited from New York City to Tokyo and produced a stream of public and private art in Britain and beyond. His edgy pieces often based on animals and seemingly carved from shrapnel could imply Cold War menace.

Meadows' work titled Public Sculpture, a controversial assembly of stone blocks and balls of dripping and dimpled metal, was commissioned for the Eastern Daily Press in 1968 at Prospect House, Norwich. It was Grade II Listed in 2018 and restored by its current owners, Alan Boswell Group, in 2022. The sculpture is on permanent display outside the building alongside an illustrated panel telling the story of Bernard Meadows and Public Sculpture.

Teaching commitments took precedence over his own work. He taught at Chelsea School of Art, the Bath Academy of Art (Corsham) and the Royal College of Art, where he was Professor of Sculpture from 1960 to 1980, teaching students including Robert Clatworthy and Elisabeth Frink. He was a member of the Fine Arts Commission from 1971 to 1976.

He returned to assist Moore at Perry Green, Hertfordshire from 1977, after Moore's health started to fail, and continued to help his mentor's estate after Moore's death in 1986, becoming an acting director of the Henry Moore Foundation.

The Yorkshire Sculpture Park held a retrospective exhibition of Meadows’ work for his 80th birthday in 1995, with a second retrospective at Gimpel Fils in London, the first exhibitions of his works for 15 years. His most famous work is probably The Spirit of Brotherhood outside the TUC headquarters, Congress House in Great Russell Street, London.

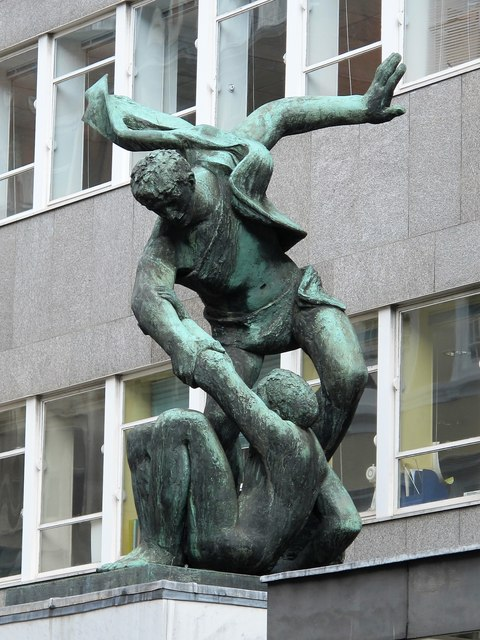
The Spirit of Brotherhood

== Private life ==
He married Marjorie Winifred Payne in 1939. They had two daughters. He died in London.
