= Tim Scott (artist) =

British sculptor (born 1937)

- Born: 1937 (age 88–89); London, UK
- Education: Lycée Jaccard in Lausanne, Architectural Association School of Architecture, Saint Martin's School of Art
- Known for: Sculpture
- Notable work: Counterpoint series, "Cathedral"
- Movement: Modern art

Tim Scott (born 1937, London) is a British sculptor known for his abstract sculptures made from transparent acrylic and steel. While studying architecture at the Architectural Association school of architecture, Scott also studied sculpture part-time at Saint Martin's School of Art with Sir Anthony Caro, where he also later taught. Inspired by the example of David Smith, Scott began to make sculptures using materials such as fibreglass, glass, metal, and acrylic sheets.

Scott was part of a group of young sculptors known as the 'New Generation', exhibiting together in London in the mid-1960s. In the 1970s, Scott created his groundbreaking series of thick-slab acrylic and steel sculptures. Frustrated ultimately with the fragility of plastics at the time, Scott switched to steel for his material, abandoning his trademark acrylic sheets altogether.

His work can be found in many important collections, including 12 works at the Tate, London, and the Museum of Modern Art, New York City. His work is also held by the Calouste Gulbenkian Museum, Lisbon, the National Gallery of Victoria, Melbourne, the Museum of Fine Arts, Boston, and the Kunsthalle, Hamburg. He had solo shows in London at the Waddington Galleries in 1966 and the Whitechapel Gallery in 1967, at Kettle's Yard in Cambridge in 1980, at the Kunsthalle in Hamburg in 1981 and the Poussin Gallery in London in 2006. His sculptures have also been exhibited in group shows, including the Arts Council England touring exhibition Kaleidoscope: Colour and Sequence in 1960s British Art, which was at the Yorkshire Sculpture Park in June 2017.

He taught inter alia as a professor at the Academy of Fine Arts Nuremberg.
