= Alton Estate =

Housing estate in Roehampton, London

Coordinates: 51.450°N 0.245°W

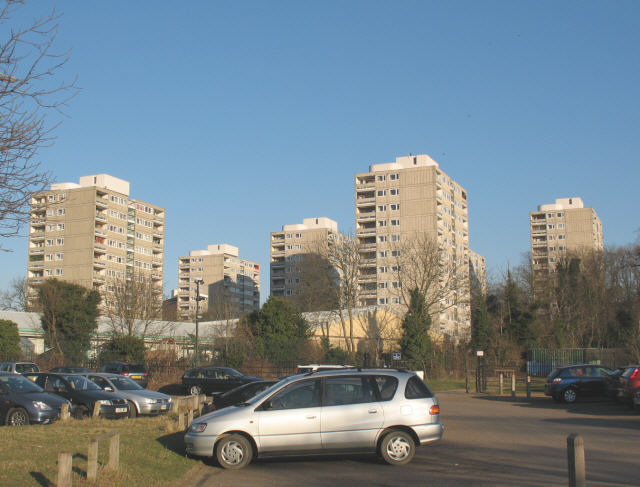
- Interactive map of Alton Estate

General information
- Location: Roehampton
- Population: 13,000

Construction
- Architect: Rosemary Stjernstedt
- Authority: London County Council
- Influence: Unité d'habitation

Refurbishment
- Proposed in: 2026
- Contractor: Redrow

Listing
- Listed: 1998
- Listed as: Conservation Area and Grade II

Other information
- Governing body: Wandsworth Council

The Alton Estate is a very large council estate situated in Roehampton, southwest London. One of the largest council estates in the UK, it occupies an extensive area of land west of Roehampton village and runs between the Roehampton Lane through-road and Richmond Park Golf Courses.

Designed by a London County Council (LCC) design team led by Rosemary Stjernstedt, the estate is known for its mix of low and high-rise modernist architecture consisting of Alton East (1958) styled in a subtle Scandinavian-influenced vernacular and its slightly later counterpart: Alton West (1959). At Highcliffe Drive on Alton West the LCC essentially retained the Georgian landscape and placed within it five ultra-modern slab blocks: Binley, Winchfield, Dunbridge, Charcot and Denmead Houses (all grade II* listed buildings), inspired by Le Corbusier's Unité d'habitation.

Overall, the estate, which celebrated its 50th anniversary in 2009, has over 13,000 residents, making it one of the largest in the United Kingdom. The architecture is mainly split between brutalist architecture and its Scandinavian-inspired counterpart.

In 1998, the estate received a Grade II listing from English Heritage. It is also a conservation area.

Planning for redevelopment of the area is currently under way by Wandsworth Council. The planned redevelopment by Redrow has been opposed by the Twentieth Century Society.

The Alton is sub-divided into ten smaller neighbourhoods, each with their own signage: Arnewood, Danebury, Highcliffe, Hyacinth, Ibsley, Manresa, Norley, Tangley, Tunworth and Wanborough.

== Alton East ==
The Alton East Estate consists of point blocks and low-level housing. The design "represents a desire by some architects to formulate a British version of modernism that was more sensitive to context and referenced a traditional vernacular."

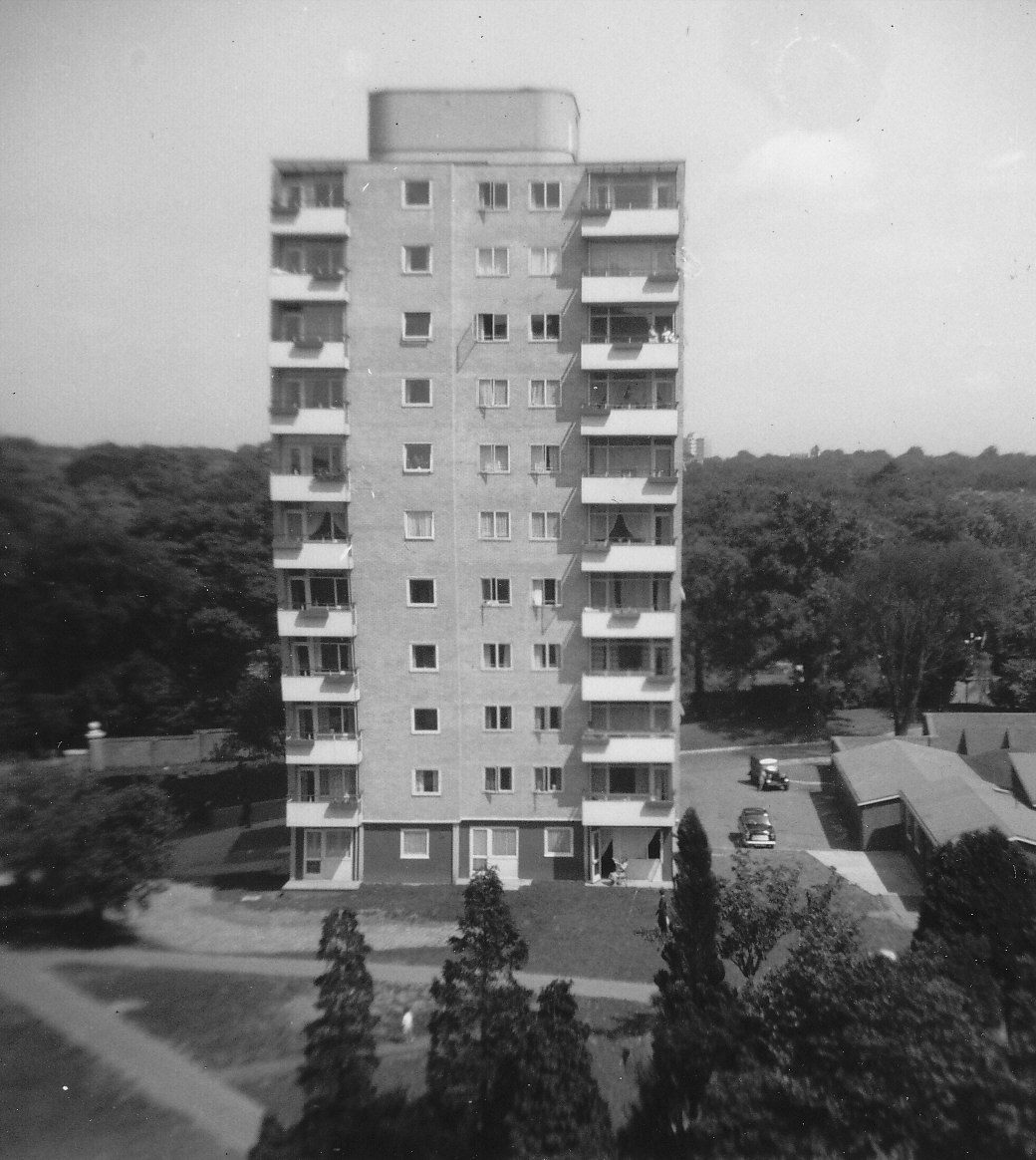
West aspect of Eashing Point on the Alton East Estate, 1957

== Alton West ==
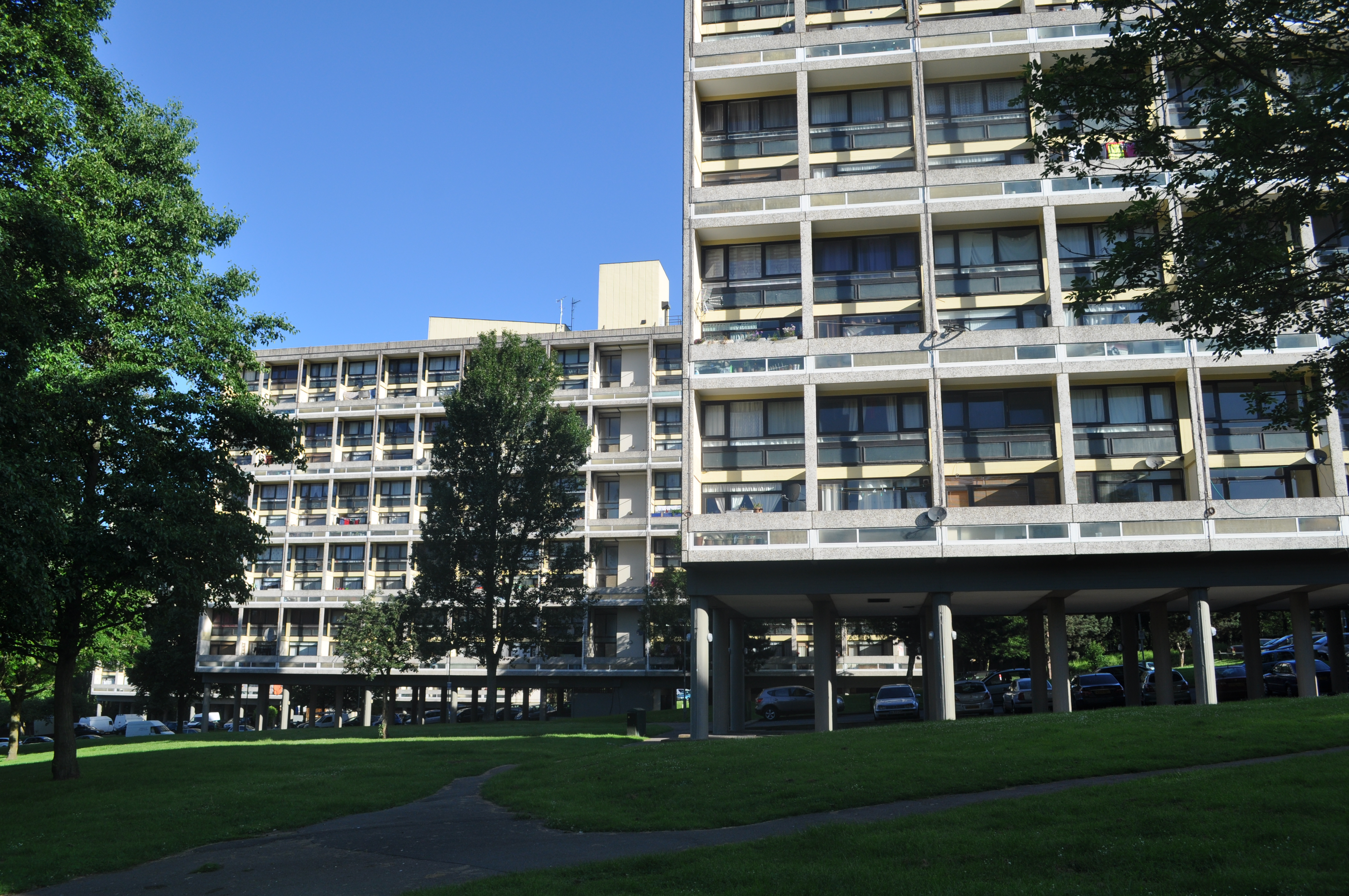
The Corbusier-inspired "slab" blocks of the Highcliffe neighbourhood in the Alton West estate, Roehampton, London, "floating" within the Georgian landscape.

At the time of its completion in 1958, Alton West was considered by many British architects to be the crowning glory of post-World War II social housing. While Victorian town houses were demolished to make room for the slab blocks, the landscape and trees were left intact, and the new buildings were slotted in between the existing greenery.

== Notable buildings and establishments ==
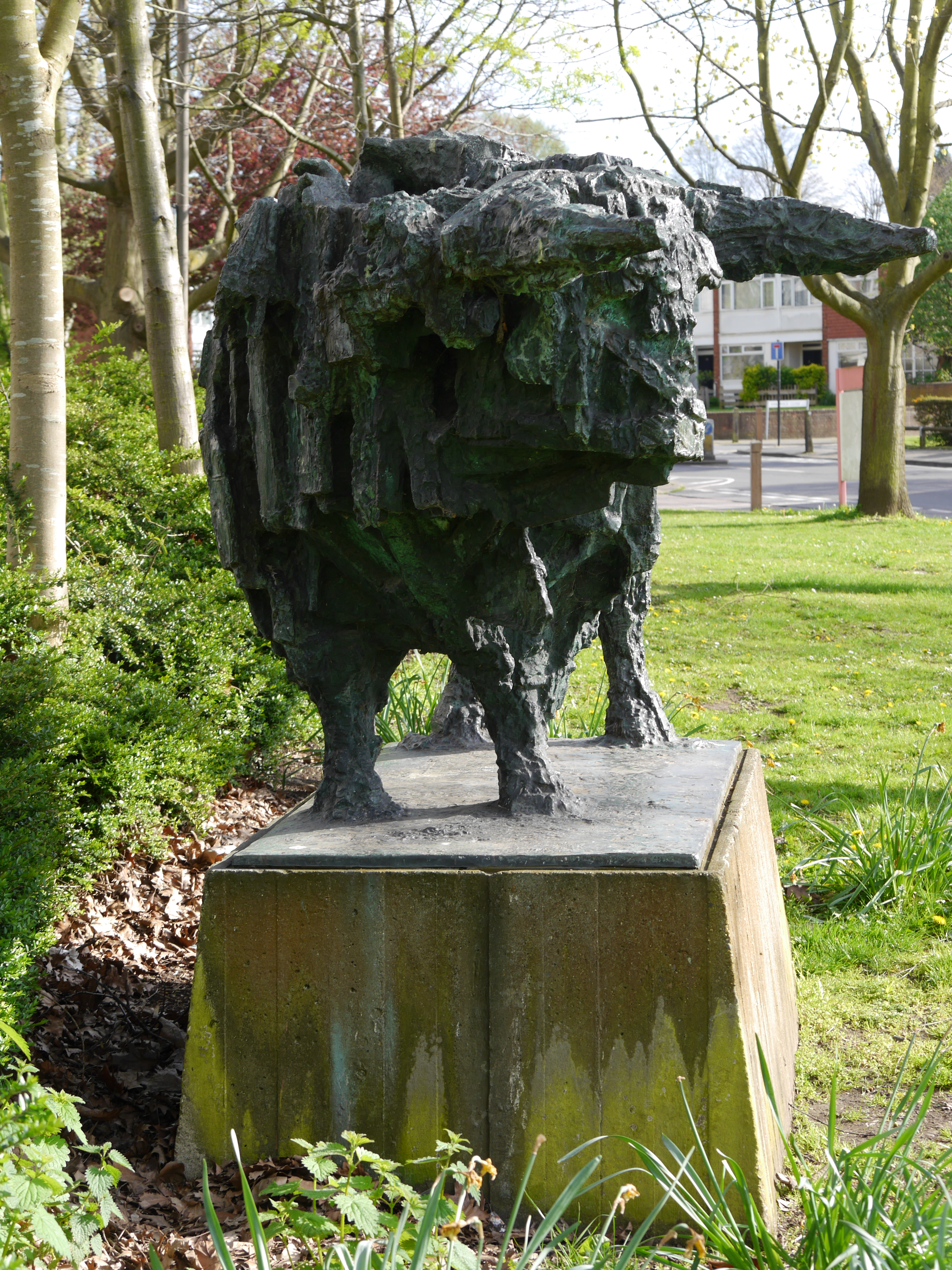
Grade II* listed Robert Clatworthy sculpture, Bull

Roehampton has a rich history and, now, to a certain extent so does the Alton Estate itself. Within the locale of the footprint occupied by the estate there are several notable buildings and establishments

- The Cornerstone – Roehampton Parish Great Hall – also serves as a community centre providing social facilities for locals
- The Highcliffe – Perhaps the Alton's most famous landmarks: 5 Grade II* Listed tower buildings, developed as part of the Narrow-Fronted Maisonette concept of the 1950s inspired by Le Corbusier
- Maryfield Convent – An order called The Poor Servants of the Mother of God
- Mount Clare – A smaller campus which is part of Roehampton University centered around an eponymous manor house
- Parkstead House – A stately home with a long and varied history which now forms a main campus of Roehampton University
- Clanfield House is one of eight red brick blocks of maisonettes built during the 1950s, on the east section of the Estate. It is an example of early attempts to create urban utopian communities, particularly in the use of allotments in front of Clanfield House.

== Transport ==
Bus routes 85, 170, 430, 265, and 419 serve the Alton Estate. The nearest railway stations are Putney and Barnes, both to the north.

== See also ==
- Alexandra Road estate, Camden
- Brunswick Centre, Bloomsbury
- Thamesmead, Bexley and Greenwich
- Aylesbury Estate
