= Three Standing Figures 1947 =

Sculpture by Henry Moore

Coordinates: 51.47813°N 0.15691°W

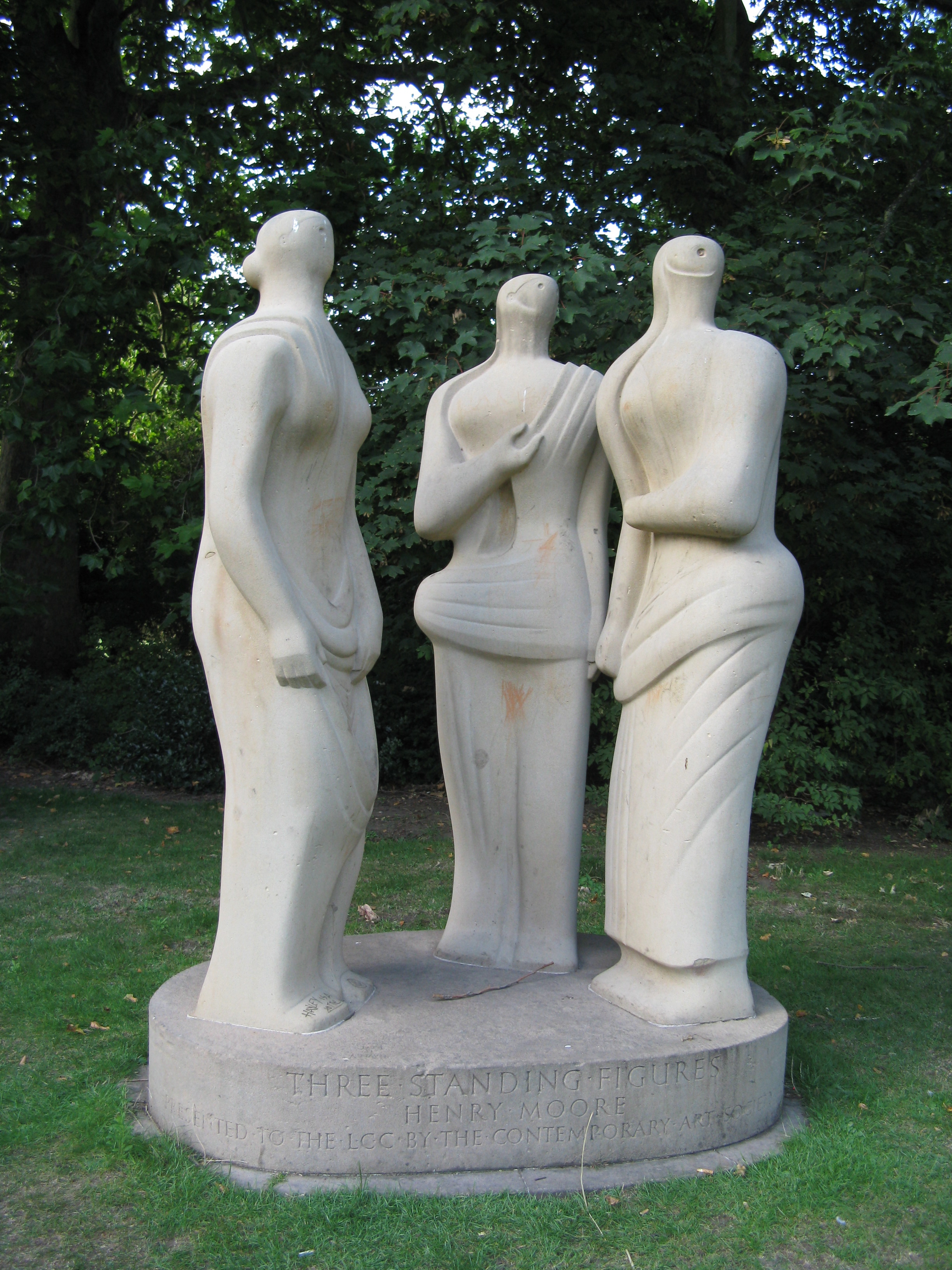
- Battersea Park, London
- Artist: Henry Moore
- Year: 1947 to 1948
- Catalogue: LH 268
- Medium: Darley Dale stone
- Dimensions: 213 cm (84 in)
- Location: London, United Kingdom

Three Standing Figures 1947 (LH 268) is a large stone sculpture by Henry Moore. It was made in 1947–48, and exhibited at London County Council's first Open-Air Sculpture Exhibition at Battersea Park in 1948. Donated to the council, it has been exhibited at the park since 1950. It became a Grade II listed building in 1988.

== Description ==
The 7 feet (2.1 m) high stone statue comprises three standing women, draped in flowing garments: two standing closer together, observed by the third. Each has rudimentary facial features, such as eye holes.

Moore's draped figures developed from a series of drawings inspired by his observations of people in underground bomb shelters during the Second World War. In 1968, Moore commented that "it is as though the three women are standing there, expecting something to happen from the sky" Sylvester published an essay in The Burlington Magazine in 1948 with an unusual interpretation, as a family group: the protective mother, the stern father, and the child on the far right.

== History ==
Moore began with a terracotta model made c.1945; its present location is unknown, but there are two known plaster copies, one at the Henry Moore Foundation and one on long-term loan to the Tate Gallery. Moore also cast a bronze edition of four (plus one artist's copy) between 1948 and 1949; an additional artist's cast was made in 1985. Examples of these sculptures are held in the Smith College Museum of Art in Massachusetts and the Peggy Guggenheim Collection in Venice.

The work in Battersea Park was carved between August 1947 and May 1948 from Darley Dale sandstone, one of the last statues that Moore made from English stone. It was originally conceived to fulfil a commission from the Museum of Modern Art in New York, but it was instead exhibited at London County Council's first Open-Air Sculpture Exhibition at Battersea Park in 1948. (MOMA took instead a cast of Moore's first large bronze, Family Group from The Barclay School in Stevenage, itself originally intended for Walter Gropius's Impington Village College.)

Moore was a member of the selection committee for the Open-Air Exhibition, and his sculpture was used on the publicity poster. It was sited in a prominent position, at the top of a slight rise in ground, with trees behind. His reputation grew dramatically from 1948, when he was a selected as Britain's greatest living artist for the 24th Venice Biennale and won the sculpture prize. The sculpture was lent for the Open-Air Exhibition in 1948, and then bought by the Contemporary Art Society and donated to London County Council. It has been permanently sited in Battersea Park in Battersea, London, in 1950.

== In popular culture ==
The sculpture featured in the 1991 Mr. Bean episode Mr. Bean Goes to Town; Bean tries to take a selfie with a polaroid camera, with the sculpture in the background. Being unsuccessful, he asks a passerby to take his photo, but the man runs off with Bean's camera.

== See also ==
- List of sculptures by Henry Moore
