= Robert Clatworthy (sculptor) =

British sculptor and art teacher (1928–2015)

- Robert Clatworthy photographed by James Hunkin in 2001
- Born: Robert Ernest Clatworthy; 31 January 1928; Bridgwater, Somerset, England
- Died: 15 or 16 March 2015
- Education: West of England College of Art; Chelsea School of Art; Slade School of Fine Art
- Known for: sculpture, painting
- Elected: RA, 26 April 1973
- Website: robertclatworthy.co.uk

Robert Ernest Clatworthy RA (31 January 1928 – 15 or 16 March 2015) was a British sculptor and teacher of art. He was head of the fine art department at the Central School of Art and Design in London from 1971 to 1975, and was elected a fellow of the Royal Academy of Arts in 1973.

== Life ==
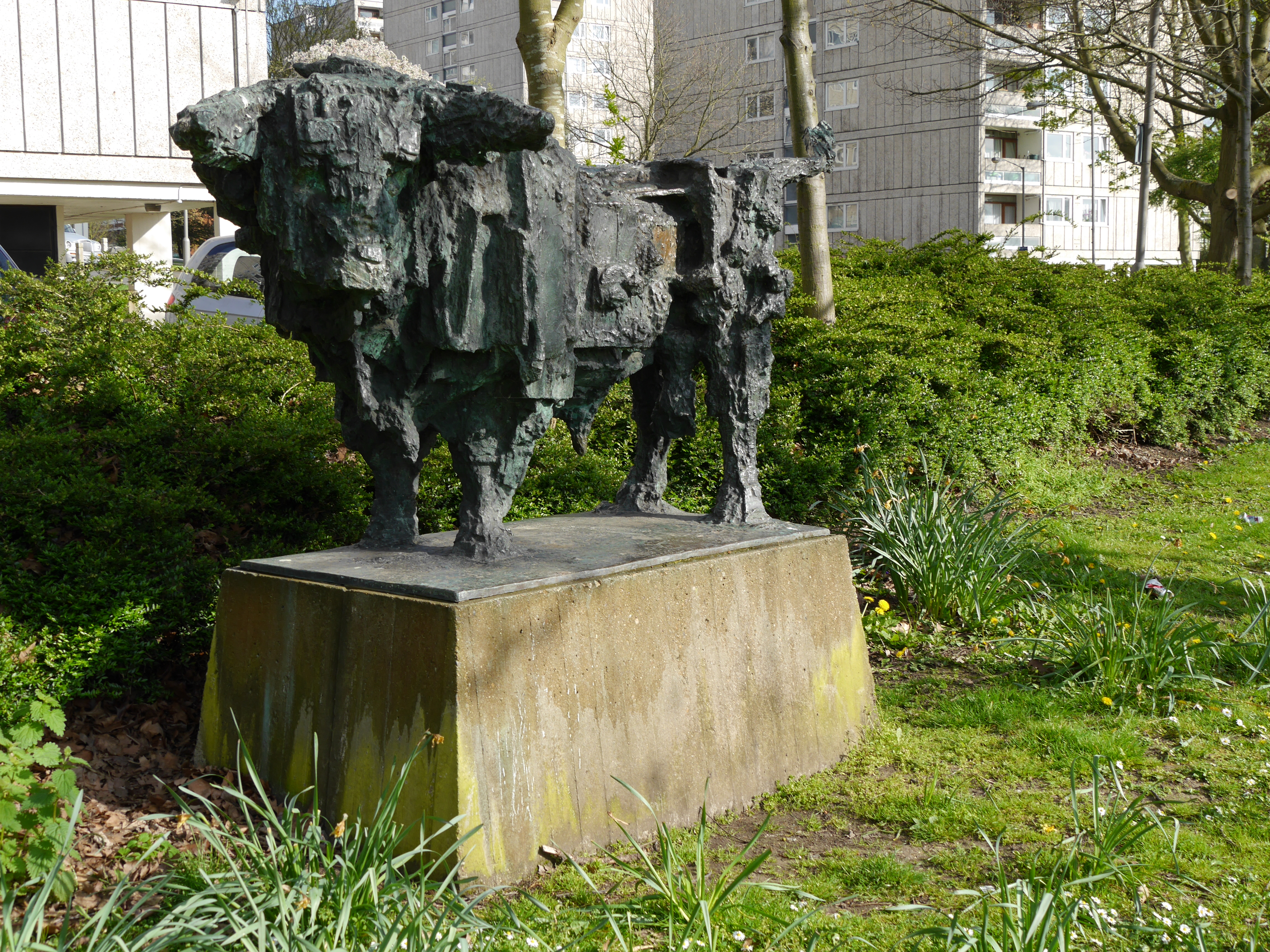
Clatworthy's Bull in the Alton Estate council housing estate in Roehampton, in south-west London

Clatworthy was born at Bridgwater, Somerset, on 31 January 1928, to Ernest Clatworthy, a railway clerk, and Gladys, née Jugaler; he went to Dr. Morgan's Grammar School in Bridgewater. He studied the violin as a boy and was uncertain whether to become an artist or a musician. In 1945–46 he studied at the West of England College of Art, and then did National Service. From 1947 to 1949 he was at the Chelsea School of Art in London, where he studied under Bernard Meadows, and then in 1950–51 went to the Slade School of Fine Art. He worked briefly as an assistant to Henry Moore; it was Moore who persuaded him to attend the Slade rather than the Royal College of Art.

In the early 1950s Clatworthy was, with Anthony Caro, Elisabeth Frink and Eduardo Paolozzi, among the young sculptors brought in by Frank Martin to teach in the new sculpture department at Saint Martin's School of Art. In 1956 he joined The London Group. From 1960 until 1972 he taught at the Royal College of Art and, between 1967 and 1971, also at the West of England College of Art. He was a governor of Saint Martin's from 1970 to 1971, and then, until 1975, head of the fine art department at Central.

He was elected a Royal Academician on 26 April 1973.

Clatworthy was married twice: in 1954 to Pamela Gordon, the daughter of Gertrude Lawrence, with whom he had two sons and a daughter, and from whom he was divorced; and in 1989 to Jane Illingworth Stubbs. After the break-up of his first marriage in the 1970s he moved with his new wife to an isolated farmhouse at Cynghordy, near Llandovery, in southern Wales, where he spent his later life as a recluse. He died on 15 or 16 March 2015.

== Work ==
Clatworthy is considered one of the informal Geometry of Fear group of sculptors, so named by Herbert Read in 1952. Many of Clatworthy's sculptures are bronzes of animals, often with heavily-textured surfaces. His first solo show was at the Hanover Gallery in 1954, and in 1959 his work was shown there with that of Arp, César, Giacometti, Matisse and Picasso.

His work is in the collections of the Tate Gallery, the Victoria and Albert Museum and the Arts Council of Great Britain. His portrait bust of Elisabeth Frink (1983) was bought by the National Portrait Gallery in 1984.

Two of his works are installed as public art: a Bull commissioned by the London County Council in 1956–57 is now in the Alton Estate council housing estate in Roehampton, in south-west London; and Horseman and Eagle, commissioned in 1984–85 for a new office block at 1 Finsbury Avenue in the City, is now in the grounds of Charing Cross Hospital in Hammersmith.

In about 1990 Clatworthy developed a skin infection which prevented him from working in plaster, and turned to painting, mostly figures and portraits of unidentified people. He returned to sculpture in 2002.

== Reception ==
In the 1950s Clatworthy was among the best-known sculptors in Britain. The critic David Sylvester thought his work the best by any sculptor younger than Moore; Clatworthy and his LCC Bull appeared on the front page of the Sunday Times in 1957; the Tate Gallery bought the first of two of his bull sculptures in the same year. His reputation later faded.
