= Michael Bolus =

- Born: 1934; Cape Town, South Africa
- Died: 2013 (aged 78–79); London, United Kingdom
- Education: Saint Martin's School of Art
- Known for: Sculpture
- Movement: Modern art

Born in South Africa, Michael Edward Bolus was an artist and teacher who settled in England in 1957 and studied at St Martin's School of Art from 1958 to 1962, studying under Anthony Caro. After a brief period living in Cape Town he returned to London in 1964 to begin a teaching post at St Martin's and the Central School of Art and Design. Bolus had his first UK solo exhibition at Waddington Galleries in 1968, which has exhibited a number of his sculptures since then.

As a student his earliest work was modelled or sculpted in stone, but Bolus soon abandoned these traditional techniques in favour of working with steel and aluminium, materials that allowed him to explore the notions of balance and the extension of form which had long interested him. For the New Generation show in 1965 he exhibited a series of polychromatic sculptures taking the form of abstract shapes cut out of sheet aluminium, placed flat on the ground or stood on edge. A good example of this group of works is, Bowbend, 1964.

In 1966 Bolus took part in the "Primary Structures" exhibition at the Jewish museum in New York. The same year he was given his first one-man show in America at the Kornblee Gallery. In the 1970s his sculpture left the ground, becoming more fragmented and making use of lattice and grid-like constructions that defy gravity, such as Sculpture No. 3, 1973 and Untitled, 1984.

Bolus was part of a generation of sculptors inspired by the constructivist work made by Julio González and Pablo Picasso and continued by David Smith and Anthony Caro. The work of these sculptors rejected the plinth and asserted the work as part of the world rather than separate from it. He studied with David Annesley, Tim Scott, William G. Tucker, Phillip King and Isaac Witkin. These Sculptors first attracted widespread attention at the New Generation exhibition in London's Whitechapel gallery in 1965.

Bolus worked as an assistant to Anthony Caro throughout his career and was regarded highly for his ability to manipulate difficult materials such as Gold and Silver

== Selected exhibitions ==
=== Group exhibitions ===
- 2019 Objects of Wonder: British Sculpture 1950 – Present, PalaisPopulaire, Berlin
- 2017–18 Kaleidoscope: Colour and Sequence in 1960s British Art
- 2008 New generation revisited: British sculpture from the sixties and seventies, a tribute to Bryan Robertson at the Whitechapel – New Art Centre, Salisbury (England)
- 2005 Metamorphosis: British Art of the Sixties, Museum of Contemporary Art of the Basil and Elise Goulandris Foundation, Chora Andros, Greece
- 1999 Centro de Arte Moderna – CAM – Fundação Calouste Gulbenkian Linhas de Sombra – Centro de Arte Moderna – CAM – Fundação Calouste Gulbenkian, Lisbon
- 1983 Skulptur und Farbe – 4. Bremer Skulpturenausstellung – GAK – Gesellschaft für Aktuelle Kunst e.V. Bremen, Bremen
- 1979 Contemporary Sculpture from Collection – MoMA – Museum of Modern Art, New York City
- 1975 The Condition of Sculpture – Hayward Gallery, London (England)
- 1968 New British Sculpture – Arnolfini, Bristol (England)
- 1966 Primary Structures: Younger American and British Sculpture – The Jewish Museum of New York City
- 1965 The New Generation – Whitechapel Gallery – London.
- 1962 Young English Sculptors - Madrid.
- 1961-2 Young Contemporaries exhibition - London
- 1961 London group show.
- 1960 Open air exhibition - Student's Sculpture - Holland Park

=== One Man Exhibitions ===
- South African Association of Art, Cape Town, 1964
- Waddington Galleries, London, 7 Sep 1965 – 2 Oct 1965
- Kornblee Gallery, New York, 1966
- Waddington Galleries, London, March, 1968
- Waddington Galleries, London, 12 January – 7 February 1970
- Waddington Galleries, London, 3–27 March 1971
- Waddington Galleries, London, 30 September – 25 October 1975
- Art Gallery of New South Wales, Sydney, 7 Aug 1999 – 24 Oct 1999

== Collections ==
- Calouste Gulbenkian Foundation Museum|Calouste Gulbenkian Foundation, Lisbon, Portugal
- The Art Gallery of New South Wales, Australia
- Tate Gallery, London
- Arts Council, London
- National Gallery of Art, Washington
- mumok, Vienna
- MoMa
- Museum of Fine Arts, Boston
