= Bryan Robertson =

British art curator

Robertson, by Ida Kar, 1958

Bryan Robertson OBE (1 April 1925 – 18 November 2002) was an English curator and arts manager described by Studio International as "the greatest Director the Tate Gallery never had".

== Biography ==
Robertson was born in London and educated at Battersea Grammar School. Unfit for military service, he became a junior editor on The Studio magazine in 1945. The art-historian and curator Kenneth Clark became a mentor, funding a year in Paris for study. In 1949 Robertson became curator at the Heffer Gallery in Cambridge and mounted a ground-breaking exhibition of contemporary French art at the Fitzwilliam Museum.

Robertson became Director of the Whitechapel Art Gallery in April 1952. As curator, he created an influential programme that gave major presentations of works by Jackson Pollock, Mark Rothko and Robert Rauschenberg and the 1956 exhibition This Is Tomorrow. The Pollock exhibition created 'an absolute furore' (Robertson's own words), and police were summoned to control the crowds queuing to get in. The same happened with the Rauschenberg exhibition in 1964. He also revived interest in the work of Barbara Hepworth and organised exhibitions of Turner (the first solo show of Turner since his death in 1851) and Stubbs.

Robertson was key in promoting the careers of many emerging British artists; Anthony Caro, David Hockney, John Hoyland, Bridget Riley, William G. Tucker, and Phillip King. Robertson placed public education at the heart of the Whitechapel programme giving space to exhibitions of work from schools.

Robertson's period at the Whitechapel transformed the profile of the Gallery at a time when it did not have regular funding from the Arts Council of Great Britain, and he was regarded as a frontrunner to take over at the Tate Gallery in 1964 following the retirement of John Rothenstein but due to politics lost out to the Gallery's deputy director, Norman Reid. He became director of the museum of the State University of New York for five years and wrote articles and monographs.

Robertson sat on the Arts Council art committee between 1958 and 1961 and again from 1980 to 1984. During his second term he began working as a freelance curator and built an impressive roster of noteworthy exhibitions, including the magnificent Raoul Dufy show at the Hayward Gallery (1983), an important retrospective of Ceri Richards at the Tate as well as co-curating Flowers Gallery's 1994 exhibition British Abstract Art Part 1: Painting at Flowers East and Flowers East at London Fields.
