= Isaac Witkin =

British sculptor (1936–2006)

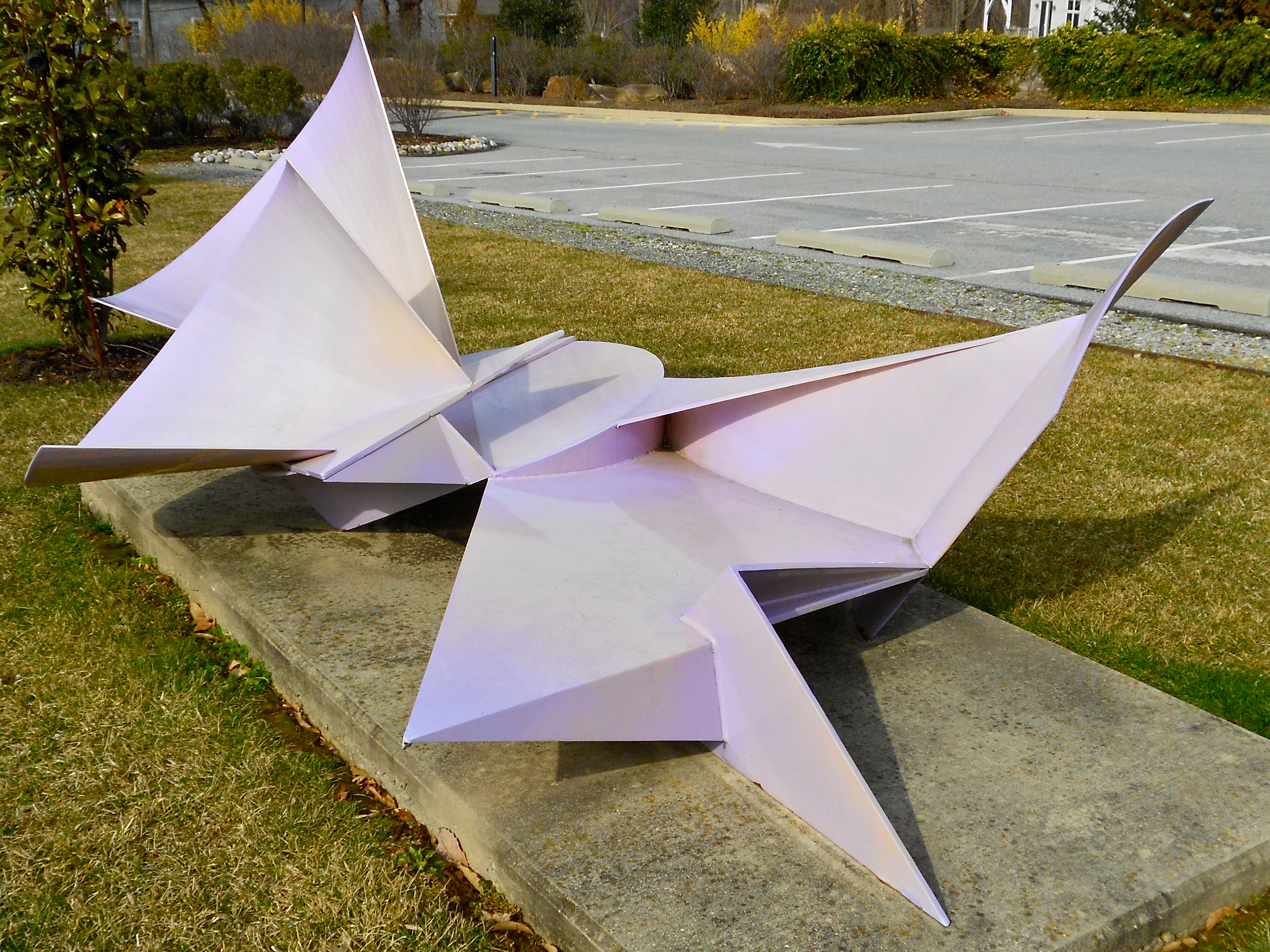
- Wild Iris, 1974, at the Delaware Art Museum
- Born: 10 May 1936
- Died: 23 April 2006 (aged 69); Pemberton, New Jersey

Isaac Witkin (10 May 1936 – 23 April 2006) was an internationally renowned modern sculptor born in Johannesburg, South Africa. Witkin entered Saint Martin's School of Art in London in 1957 and studied under Sir Anthony Caro and alongside artists including Phillip King, William G. Tucker, David Annesley, and Michael Bolus. Witkin helped create a new style of sculpture which led to this New Generation of sculptors and their innovating abstract forms of modern sculpture reaching and changing the art world. Witkin's abstract works of usually brightly colored fiberglass or wood was noted for its "witty, Pop-Art look".

== Biography ==
After graduating from Saint Martin's in 1960, Witkin was an apprentice of Henry Moore until 1963. Witkin's work was well received in his first solo show at Rowan Gallery, London and in an important 1964 show at Whitechapel Gallery, also in London, where Witkin and his fellow Saint Martin's "New Generation" sculptors made their big entry into the English art world. In 1965 his work received a first prize in the Paris Biennale. His piece, Nagas, was included in the seminal 1966 exhibit, "Primary Structures" at the Jewish Museum in New York representing the British influence on the "New Art" anchored by Anthony Caro.

Witkin then moved from pupil to teacher, teaching at Saint Martin's for two years. He then moved to the United States. At Bennington College, Bennington, Vermont, Witkin worked with a community of artists known as "the Green Mountain boys" who either taught at the school or were part of the local arts community, including notables such as painter Kenneth Noland, Helen Frankenthaler, Larry Poons, Paul Feeley and Jules Olitski and art critic Clement Greenberg.

Witkin's works at this time were in the style of formalist abstractions, moving from the fiberglass and wood of his earlier works to heavy welded steel industrial structures with complex Cubist compositions. These were well received in America, notably during a 1966 show at the Jewish Museum, in New York City, and various other showings in that city thereafter. In 1976 Witkin was the subject of a PBS documentary, Sculpture by Isaac Witkin, directed by Neal Marshad that premiered in the United States on Public Broadcasting Service on October 19, 1976 and at The Metropolitan Museum of Art on November 7, 1976. In 1978 Witkin moved to New Jersey, becoming associated with the Johnson Atelier, Princeton, New Jersey, where he was an artist in residence.

During this time Witkin developed the style which would form the remainder of his works. Here he discovered a process of pouring molten bronze into wet sand on the ground to create organic appearing forms. By assembling these forms he engaged in "...creating language out of the behavioral flow of metal, wresting order from chaos" as he is quoted as describing the process in his obituary at The Times Online website. The remainder of his works were primarily in bronze, both poured and then cast, colored by chemicals to have a variety of patinas. However, some later work was also done in stone, though in the same style as the poured bronzes.

== Later years ==
Witkin subsequently taught at the Parsons School of Design, New York, New York, and the Philadelphia College of Art, Philadelphia, Pennsylvania and Burlington County College, Pemberton, New Jersey. He also was honored as a Member of the National Academy, New York, NY and as a Member, Royal Society of British Sculptors. During his career Witkin also received the following awards: State of New Jersey Art Achievement Award, Burlington County College Foundation; Adolph and Esther Gottlieb Foundation Grant; New Jersey State Council on the Arts Grant and in 1981 a Guggenheim Fellowship.

Through his work Witkin became an acquaintance of fellow sculptor and patron of the arts J. Seward Johnson, Jr., of the Johnson and Johnsons. This friendship allowed Witkin to persuade Johnson to buy and transform the abandoned New Jersey Fairgrounds into what became the Grounds for Sculpture Park, a 35-acre (140,000 m^{2}) open air display of sculptures in Hamilton Township, New Jersey. Several of Witkin's works are among the Grounds permanent collections. Witkins work is also included in the permanent collections of the Smithsonian American Art Museum, Washington DC, the Centre for Modern Art, Calouste Gulbenkian Foundation, Lisbon, Portugal; Fine Arts Museum, University of Sydney, Australia; the Hirshhorn Museum and Sculpture Garden, Washington, DC; Laumier Sculpture Park, St. Louis, MO; Tate Gallery, London; and The Israel Museum, Jerusalem. His work is also displayed on his family's website, www.isaacwitkin.com.

Isaac Witkin died 23 April 2006 of a heart attack at his home in Pemberton, New Jersey. He is survived by his two daughters, his sizeable body of work, and the artists it has inspired.

== See also ==
- Angola (Witkin)

== Sources ==
- Juliff, Toby, 'A New Generation of British Art: A Problem of Provincialism' in Australian and New Zealand Journal of Art, vol 18. n.1 pp. 125–145
- "Isaac Witkin Obituary", Times Online; "Isaac Witkin", Grounds for Sculpture Website, isaacwitkin.com
