= Early One Morning (Caro) =

Sculpture by Anthony Caro

- Artist: Anthony Caro
- Year: 1962
- Medium: metal, painted in red
- Dimensions: 289.6 cm × 619.8 cm × 335.3 cm (114.0 in × 244.0 in × 132.0 in)
- Location: Tate Modern, London

Early One Morning is a metal sculpture by British artist Anthony Caro, from 1962. It has been held by the Tate, in London, since 1965.

== History and description ==
The abstract sculpture is an arrangement of metal parts painted red, with no obvious focus or representative elements. It comprises a collection of planes and lines arranged along a horizontal axis, with an appearance of lightness that belies its heavy construction. The work measures 2.9 by 6.2 by 3.35 metres (9.5 ft × 20.3 ft × 11.0 ft). The self-supporting work rests on the floor, with no plinth, to be viewed in the round.

After being an assistant to Henry Moore in the 1950s, the works of David Smith inspired Caro to move decisively away from Moore's semi-figurative sculpture towards more abstract works constructed from industrial metal elements. The sculpture was made at Caro's home, but the large work could not be properly viewed in the confined space, so Caro and a friend took it to pieces late at night and reassembled it outside. The name comes from Caro's first proper view of the work, early the next morning. It was originally painted green, to unify the disparate elements into one piece. Caro was unhappy with the result, and Caro's wife, artist Sheila Girling, suggested painting it red instead.

The complete sculpture was first exhibited at the Whitechapel Art Gallery in the autumn of 1963, and was included in the exhibition of modern sculpture at the British Pavilion at the Venice Biennale in 1966.

== Provenance ==
It was acquired from the artist by the Contemporary Art Society in 1965, and presented to the Tate Gallery later that year.
