= Carl Andre =

American minimalist artist (1935–2024)

- Carl Andre
- Born: September 16, 1935; Quincy, Massachusetts, U.S.
- Died: January 24, 2024 (aged 88); New York City, U.S.
- Education: Phillips Academy
- Known for: Sculpture, Poetry
- Notable work: Equivalent VIII; Lever
- Movement: Minimalism
- Spouses: Barbara Brown (divorced); Rosemarie Castoro (divorced); Ana Mendieta (m. 1985; died 1985); Melissa Kretschmer (m. 1999)

Carl Andre (September 16, 1935 – January 24, 2024) was an American minimalist artist recognized for his ordered linear and grid format sculptures. His stark minimal art sculptures range from large public artworks (such as Stone Field Sculpture, 1977, in Hartford, Connecticut, and Lament for the Children, 1976, in Long Island City, New York), to large interior works exhibited on the floor (such as 144 Magnesium Square, 1969), to small intimate works (such as Satier: Zinc on Steel, 1989, and 7 Alnico Pole, 2011).

Andre died in Manhattan on January 24, 2024, at the age of 88.

== Early life ==
Andre was born on September 16, 1935, in Quincy, Massachusetts, the youngest of the three children of George (a master designer of freshwater plumbing for ships) and Margaret (Johnson) Andre. He completed primary and secondary schooling in the Quincy public school system and studied art at Phillips Academy in Andover, Massachusetts, from 1951 to 1953. While at Phillips Academy, he became friends with Hollis Frampton, who would later influence Andre's radical approach to sculpture through their conversations about art and introductions to other artists.

Andre served in the U.S. Army in North Carolina from 1955 to 1956, and moved to New York City in 1956. While in New York, Frampton introduced Andre to the work of Constantin Brâncuși, and Andre became re-acquainted with a former classmate from Phillips Academy, Frank Stella, in 1958. Andre shared studio space with Stella from 1958 through 1960.

== Work ==
=== Early work ===
Andre cited Constantin Brâncuși as an inspiration for his early wood sculptures, but his conversations with Stella about space and form led him in a different direction. While sharing a studio with Stella, Andre developed a series of wooden "cut" sculptures (such as Radial Arm Saw-Cut Sculpture, 1959 and Maple Spindle Exercise, 1959). Stella is noted as having said to Andre (regarding hunks of wood removed from Andre's sculpture), "Carl, that's sculpture, too."

From 1960 to 1964, Andre worked as a freight brakeman and train conductor in New Jersey for the Pennsylvania Railroad. His experience with blue-collar labor and the ordered nature of conducting freight trains would later influence Andre's sculpture and artistic personality. For example, it was not uncommon for Andre to dress in overalls and a blue work shirt, even to the most formal occasions.

During this period, Andre focused mainly on writing, and there is little notable sculpture of his on record between 1960 and 1965. His poetry resurfaced later, most notably in a book published in 1980 by NYU Press called 12 Dialogues, in which Andre and Hollis Frampton took turns responding to one another at a typewriter using mainly poetry and free-form essay-like texts. Andre's concrete poetry has been exhibited in the United States and Europe, a comprehensive collection of which is in the collection of the Stedelijk Museum in Amsterdam.

=== Mature work ===
Carl Andre, 144 Magnesium Square, 1969, 144 thin magnesium plates, each measuring 12 by 12 inches (300 by 300 mm), 144 in × 144 in (3,700 mm × 3,700 mm)

Carl Andre, Satier: Zinc on Steel, 1989, zinc and steel, in two parts, 0.44 in × 6 in × 11.44 in (11 mm × 152 mm × 291 mm)

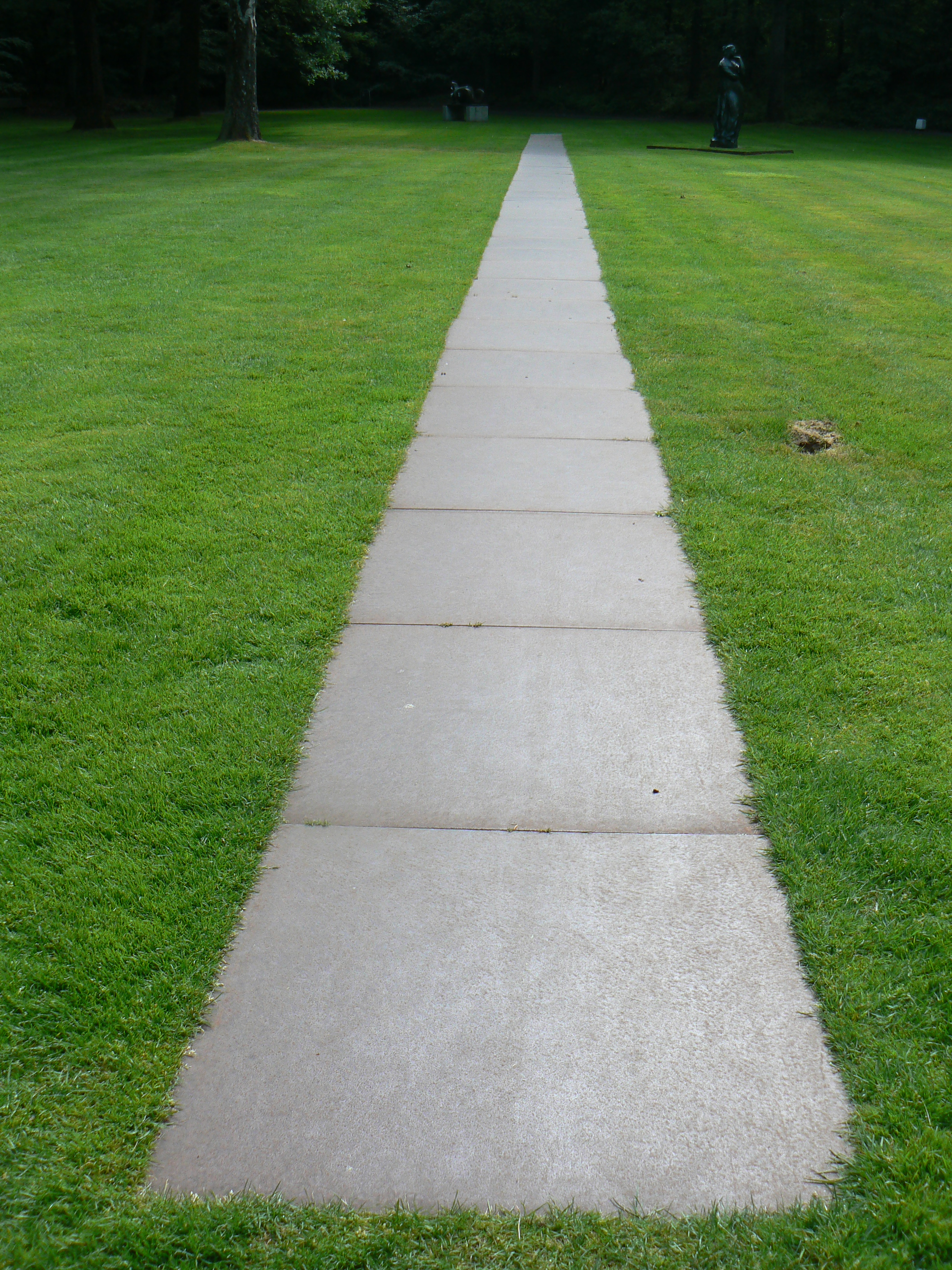
Carl Andre, 43 Roaring forty, 1968 Kröller-Müller Museum, Netherlands

In 1965, Andre had his first public exhibition of his work in the Shape and Structure show curated by Henry Geldzahler at the Tibor de Nagy Gallery.

In the late 1960s, entrepreneur Karl Ströher from Darmstadt, Germany, acquired three major works from Andre to give them on loan to the Hessisches Landesmuseum Darmstadt. Peter Iden then acquired these works for the Museum für Moderne Kunst Frankfurt in 1981. The works have since been shown in various "Change of Scene" exhibitions (1992–2002) at the museum in Frankfurt and internationally.

In 1969, Andre helped organize the Art Workers Coalition.

In 1970, he had a solo exhibition at the Solomon R. Guggenheim Museum.

In 2014, Dia:Beacon organized Carl Andre: Sculpture as Place, 1958–2010, the first retrospective to survey the full range of his work; it later travelled to museums in Madrid, Berlin, Paris and Los Angeles.

=== Equivalent VIII ===
In 1972, Britain's Tate Gallery acquired Andre's Equivalent VIII, an arrangement of 120 firebricks.

The piece was exhibited several times without incident, but it became the center of controversy in 1976 after being featured in an article in The Sunday Times and later being defaced with blue food dye. The "Bricks controversy" became one of the most famous public debates in Britain about contemporary art.

=== Lever ===
Andre's Lever consists of a single line of 137 firebricks. The work concisely divides a space as the bricks hug the floor. The exhibition of Lever at the 1966 exhibition Primary Structures at the Jewish Museum in New York brought considerable recognition to Carl Andre.

== Criticism ==
The gradual evolution of consensus about the meaning of Andre's art was compiled in the book About Carl Andre: Critical Texts Since 1965, published by Ridinghouse in 2008. The most significant essays and exhibition reviews were collated into this volume, including texts written by some of the most influential art historians and critics: Clement Greenberg, Donald Kuspit, Lucy R. Lippard, Robert C. Morgan, Barbara Rose and Roberta Smith.

== Personal life ==
Andre was married four times. The first two marriages ended in divorce. In 1988 he was acquitted of the murder of his third wife Ana Mendieta and in 1999 he married his fourth wife, artist Melissa Kretschmer.

=== Death of Ana Mendieta ===
In 1979, he met his third wife, artist Ana Mendieta, through a mutual friendship with artists Leon Golub and Nancy Spero at AIR Gallery in New York City. Andre and Mendieta married in January 1985. Mendieta fell to her death from Andre's 34th-story apartment window in September 1985, after an argument with Andre. Their neighbors, a couple next door, are reported to have heard Mendieta scream "No" the same night, and Andre was also seen with multiple scratches on his face after that night. Andre was quoted from a 9-1-1 call after her death to have said, "What happened was we had ... my wife is an artist and I am an artist and we had a quarrel about the fact that I was more, eh, exposed to the public than she was and she went to the bedroom and I went after her and she went out of the window". The same night, Andre was charged with second-degree murder. He elected to be tried before a judge with no jury. In 1988, he was acquitted of all charges related to Mendieta's death.

Museums that exhibit Andre's work have been met with outrage from Mendieta's supporters. The 2022 podcast Death of an Artist detailed a culture of secrecy around Mendieta's death and Andre's potential involvement. In 2017, protestors attended the opening of his exhibition at The Geffen Contemporary at MOCA in Los Angeles, distributing postcards that read, "Carl Andre is at MOCA Geffen. ¿Dónde está Ana Mendieta?" ('Where is Ana Mendieta?').

== Artist books ==
- Quincy Book. Andover: Addison Gallery of American Art, 1973. Artist book by Carl Andre which features commissioned photographs of landscapes and monuments in his hometown of Quincy, Massachusetts. Quincy was originally printed in conjunction with Andre's 1973 solo show at Addison Gallery, and reprinted by Primary Information in 2014.
- America Drill: Red Cut, White Cut, Blue Cut. Brussels: Maîtres de Forme Contemporains/Michèle Didier, and Paula Cooper Gallery, 2003. Limited edition of 100 numbered, signed and stamped copies, 400 numbered copies and 100 artist's proofs.
