= John McCracken (artist) =

American minimalist artist (1934–2011)

- Born: John Harvey McCracken; December 9, 1934; Berkeley, California, US
- Died: April 8, 2011 (aged 76); New York City, US
- Known for: Sculpture
- Movement: Minimalism

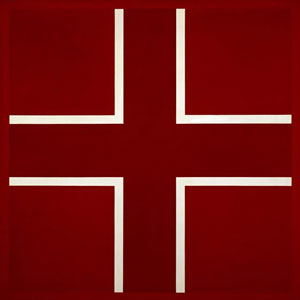
23, oil on canvas painting by McCracken, 1964, Smithsonian American Art Museum

John Harvey McCracken (December 9, 1934 – April 8, 2011) was an American minimalist visual artist. He lived and worked in Los Angeles, Santa Fe, New Mexico, and New York.

== Education and teaching ==
After graduating from high school, McCracken served in the United States Navy for four years before enrolling in the California College of Arts and Crafts in Oakland, earning a B.F.A. in 1962 and completing most of the work for an M.F.A. During these years he studied with Gordon Onslow Ford and Tony DeLap.

Taught:

- 1965–1966: University of California, Irvine
- 1966–1968: University of California, Los Angeles
- 1968–1969: School of Visual Arts, New York City
- 1971–1972: Hunter College, New York
- 1972–1973: University of Nevada, Reno
- 1973–1975: University of Nevada, Las Vegas
- 1975–1976: University of California, Irvine
- 1975–1985: College of Creative Studies, University of California, Santa Barbara

== Work ==
John McCracken developed his early sculptural work while studying painting as a graduate student at the California College of Arts and Crafts during the late 1950s and early 1960s. He worked alongside artists John Slorp, Peter Schnore, Tom Nuzum, Vincent Perez, and Terry St. John. While experimenting with increasingly three-dimensional canvases, McCracken began to produce art objects made with industrial techniques and materials. His pieces were handcrafted from plywood and surfaced with fiberglass and layers of hand-mixed, reflective, colorful resin. He applied techniques akin to those used in surfboard construction. In the late 1960s, McCracken moved to Los Angeles, where he worked until moving Santa Fe in the early 1990s. His West Coast work represents a unique interpretation of minimalist art being produced in New York during the period. McCracken's work, along with his contemporaries, often used colors and reflective surfaces that referenced the California sun, colorful cars, and surfboards. Later McCracken was part of the Light and Space movement that includes James Turrell, Peter Alexander, Larry Bell, Robert Irwin, Noni Grevillea, and others. In interviews, however, he usually cited his greatest influences as the hard edge works of the abstract expressionist Barnett Newman and minimalists like Donald Judd, Dan Flavin and Carl Andre.

Early objects created by John McCracken were derived from company logos such as the Chevron corporation logo. His sculptures deal with the interrelationships existing between the material world and design.

In 1966, McCracken generated his signature sculptural form: the plank, a narrow, monochromatic, rectangular board format that leans at an angle against the wall (the site of painting) while simultaneously entering into the three-dimensional realm and physical space of the viewer. He conceived the plank idea in a period when artists across the stylistic spectrum were combining aspects of painting and sculpture in their work and many were experimenting with sleek, impersonal surfaces. As the artist noted, "I see the plank as existing between two worlds, the floor representing the physical world of standing objects, trees, cars, buildings, [and] human bodies, ... and the wall representing the world of the imagination, illusionist painting space, [and] human mental space." The sculptures consist of plywood forms coated with fiberglass and layers of polyester resin. While the polished resin surface recalls the aesthetic of 1960s southern California surfboard and Kustom Kar cultures, the title was drawn from advertising slogans in fashion magazines. In addition to the planks, the artist also creates wall pieces and free-standing sculptures in varying geometrical shapes and sizes, ranging from smaller forms on pedestals to large-scale, outdoor structures in the shape of pyramids, ziggurats, tetrahedrons and occasionally crystals. He worked in highly polished stainless steel and bronze and occasionally made work that in effect sliced the planks into thin, repeating elements that leaned against the wall in rows.

In McCracken's work, color was also used as "material." Bold solid colors with their highly polished finish reflect the unique California light or mirror the observer in a way that takes the work into another dimension. His palette included bubble-gum pink, lemon yellow, deep sapphire and ebony, usually applied as a monochrome. Sometimes an application of multiple colors marbleizes or runs down the sculpture's surface, like a molten lava flow. McCracken typically makes each resin or lacquer work by hand rather than using industrial fabrication. Each is handmade by McCracken himself, who carefully paints them. The monochrome surfaces are sanded and polished many times to such a degree of reflectiveness that they seem translucent. He also made objects of softly stained wood or, in recent years, highly polished bronze and reflective stainless steel. In 2010, for example, he created various sculptures that are polished to produce such a high degree of reflectivity that they simultaneously activate their surroundings and seem entirely camouflaged.

In 1971 to 1972, he made a rarely seen series of paintings based on Hindu and Buddhist mandalas, first shown at Castello di Rivoli in 2011. John McCracken: Sketchbook was published in 2008 by Santa Fe–based Radius Books.

During the 1970s and early 1980s, a period when he devoted his time to teaching at the University of Nevada in Reno and Las Vegas and at the University of California, Santa Barbara, McCracken received relatively little critical attention. A 1985 move to Los Angeles with his wife, artist Gail Barringer, revived his career in terms of newly conceived bodies of work, gallery and museum exhibitions, and recognition by a younger generation of artists, dealers, and curators. McCracken had lived in Santa Fe since 1994.

== Exhibitions ==
McCracken had his first exhibition at the Nicholas Wilder Gallery in Los Angeles in 1965 and his first in New York at the Robert Elkon Gallery in 1966. He then trailed off, with his next show at Sonnabend Gallery in 1992.

McCracken's art has been included in every important exhibition of Minimalist sculpture in both the United States and Europe, starting with “Primary Structures” at the Jewish Museum in 1966 and with "American Sculpture of the Sixties" at the Los Angeles County Museum.

A retrospective of McCracken's work was hosted by the Castello di Rivoli - Museo d'Arte Contemporanea, Turin in the spring of 2011. Other recent solo exhibitions include Inverleith House at the Royal Botanic Garden Edinburgh (2009) and the Stedelijk Museum voor Actuele Kunst (S.M.A.K.), Ghent (2004).

He was honored at Documenta 12 in Kassel in 2007, in which a small survey of his art was woven throughout the larger show.

== At auction ==
His top-ten prices at auction all exceed $200,000, including his high auction mark for an eight-foot-tall Black Plank from 1972, in polyester resin, fiberglass, and plywood, that sold for £180,000 ($358,637) at Phillips de Pury & Company London in June 2007. More recently, Flash (2002), a fire-engine-red plank piece in the same media, sold for $290,500 at Christie's New York in November 2010 against an estimate of $120–180,000.

== Works in permanent collections ==
- No. 25, 1964, University Art Museum, University of California, Berkeley
- Nine Planks V, 1974, Laguna Art Museum, Laguna Beach
- Blue Column, 1967, Los Angeles County Museum of Art
- Plank, 1976, Los Angeles County Museum of Art
- Don't Tell Me When to Stop, 1967, Los Angeles County Museum of Art
- Untitled, 1982, Los Angeles County Museum of Art
- Mykonos, 1965, Newport Harbor Art Museum, Newport Beach
- Plank I, 1974, Newport Harbor Art Museum, Newport Beach
- Pyramid, Newport Harbor Art Museum, Newport Beach
- Red Cube, 1971, Newport Harbor Art Museum, Newport Beach
- Untitled, Newport Harbor Art Museum, Newport Beach
- Blue Post and Lintel I, 1965, Norton Simon Museum, Pasadena
- Le Baron, Oakland Museum, Oakland
- Love in Italian, 1967, Oakland Museum, Oakland
- Nine Planks, IV, 1974, San Diego Museum of Contemporary Art, La Jolla
- Painting, 1974, San Diego Museum of Contemporary Art, La Jolla
- Right Down, 1967, San Francisco Museum of Modern Art, San Francisco
- University Art Museum, University of California, Santa Barbara
- Santa Barbara Museum of Art, Santa Barbara
- Blue Post and Lintel, 1970, Honolulu Museum of Art, Honolulu, Hawaii
- Chimu, 1965, Honolulu Museum of Art, Honolulu, Hawaii
- Yellow Pyramid, 1965, Honolulu Museum of Art, Honolulu, Hawaii
- Plank, 1980, K & B Corporation, New Orleans, Louisiana
- The Absolutely Naked Fragrance, 1967, Museum of Modern Art, New York, New York
- Naxos, 1965, Solomon R. Guggenheim Museum, New York, New York
- Untitled (Pink Box), 1970, Solomon R. Guggenheim Museum, New York, New York
- Cosmic Voyage, 1999, Westmoreland Museum of American Art, Greensburg
- Untitled, 1969, Solomon R. Guggenheim Museum, New York, New York
- Violet Block in Two Parts, 1966, Whitney Museum of American Art, New York, New York
- Untitled (Grey Plank), 1978, Rhode Island School of Design Museum, Providence, Rhode Island
- 23, 1964, Smithsonian American Art Museum
- Untitled slab painting, resin and fiberglass sculpture, 1981, Smithsonian American Art Museum
- Green, Minneapolis Institute of Art
- Mandala V, 1972, Minneapolis Institute of Art
- You Won't Know Which One Until You've Been to All of Them, 1967, Milwaukee Art Museum, Milwaukee, Wisconsin
- Red Plank, 1969. The Art Institute of Chicago
- Black Box #2, 1971, Art Gallery of Ontario, Toronto, Canada
- Wing (Aile), 1999, French National Art Collection (FNAC)
- Gate, 1995, Berardo Museum, Lisbon, Portugal

== Bibliography ==
- Heroic Stance: The Sculpture of John McCracken. Newport Harbor Art Museum, 1987. 1987. ISBN 0-917493-09-5.
- Research Information System - John McCracken
- Busch, Julia M., A Decade of Sculpture: the New Media in the 1960s (The Art Alliance Press: Philadelphia; Associated University Presses: London, 1974) ISBN 0-87982-007-1
