= Twenty Four Hours (sculpture) =

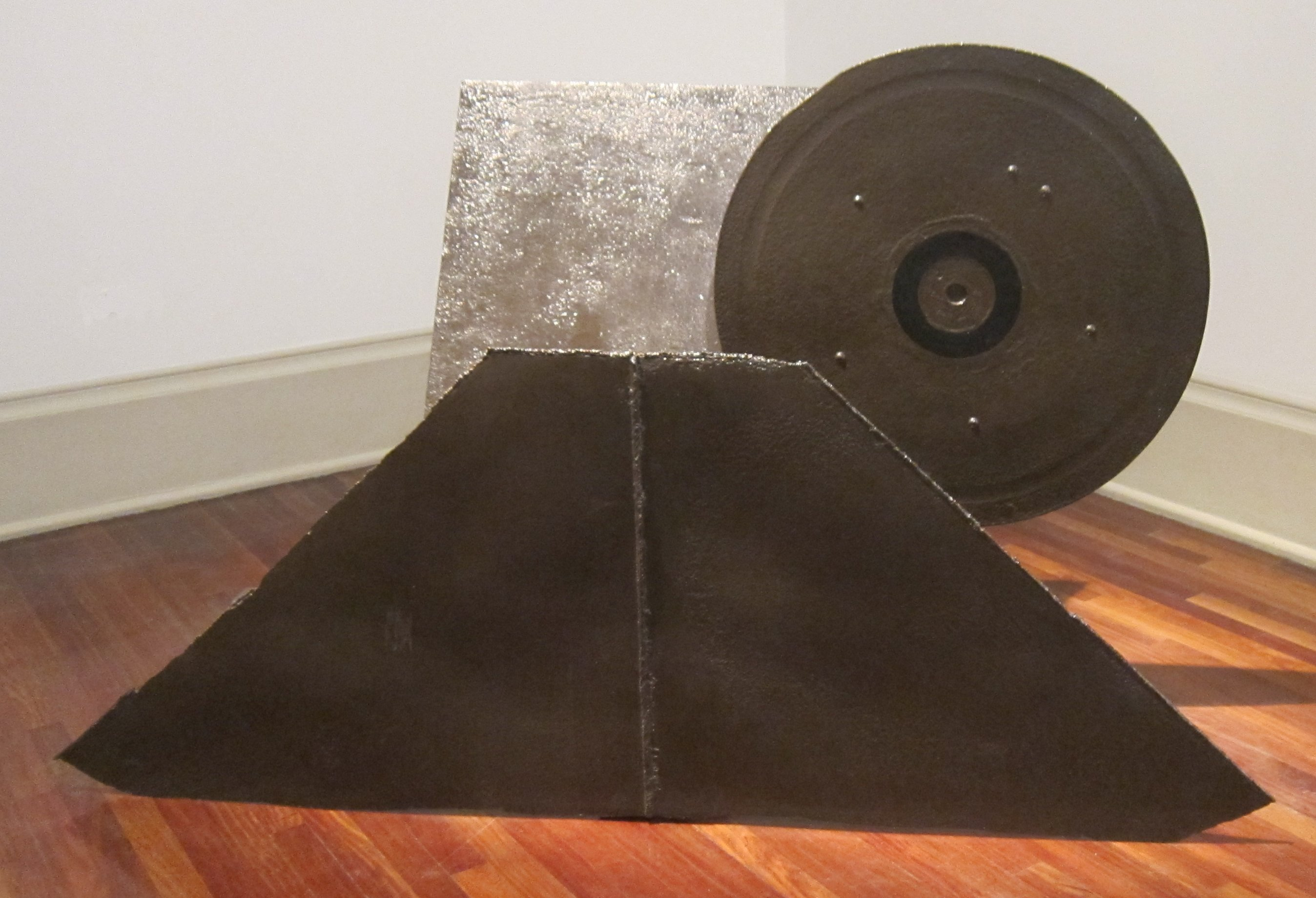
- Twenty Four Hours (1960)
- Artist: Anthony Caro
- Year: 1960
- Completion date: March 1960
- Catalogue: T01987
- Type: Sculpture
- Medium: Steel
- Subject: Abstract
- Dimensions: 83.8 cm × 138.4 cm × 223.5 cm (33.0 in × 54.5 in × 88.0 in)
- Location: Tate Britain; London
- Accession: 1975
- Website: www.anthonycaro.org

Twenty Four Hours is a painted steel sculpture by Sir Anthony Caro, from 1960. It is located in Tate Britain, London. It was purchased in 1975.

== History and description ==
The sculpture is important in the history of British sculpture since it is Caro's first abstract sculpture and his first welded sculpture. It was previously owned by the American art critic Clement Greenberg, who Caro met, along with abstract painters and sculptors such as Kenneth Noland and David Smith, during a visit to the United States in 1959. The sculpture is constructed out of found pieces of steel.

This sculpture was previously exhibited at the Whitechapel Art Gallery (September–October 1963), UCLA Art Galleries (Los Angeles, 1963), Washington Gallery of Modern Art (February–March 1965), and the Hayward Gallery (January–March 1969).
