= Primary Structures (1966 exhibition) =

1966 minimalist art exhibition

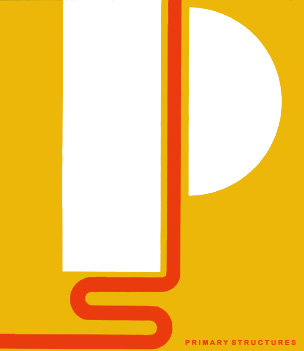
Exhibit Catalog Cover designed by Elaine Lustig Cohen

Primary Structures: Younger American and British Sculptors was an exhibition presented by the Jewish Museum in New York City from April 27 to June 12, 1966. The show was a survey of recent work in sculpture by artists from the Northeast United States, California and Great Britain that shared general characteristics of scale, simplified geometry and smooth, often colorful, industrial surfaces. Its legacy, which focuses on a subset of the artists in the show, is as the exhibition that introduced Minimal Art to the broad public, both through the exhibition itself and the wide attention it received in national media. Primary Structures was organized by Kynaston McShine, the Jewish Museum's Curator of Painting and Sculpture.

== Response ==
This exhibit was a critical and media success as reported in Time and Newsweek, presenting the public with a show dedicated to a "New Art". Critical labels for the art included "ABC art," "reductive art" and "Minimalism," though these labels were all roundly rejected by the artists themselves, notably Donald Judd.

The Primary Structures art featured stripped-down forms and materials with smooth, shiny surfaces. One of the most unusual new ideas to come from the exhibit was the concept of an artist as a "designer", not necessarily as a "maker". During a forum conducted at the museum on the "New Sculpture", in which McShine, Judd, Barbara Rose, Robert Morris, and Mark di Suvero participated, di Suvero famously remarked, "...my friend Donald Judd cannot qualify as an artist because he doesn't do the work", to which Judd replied, "...The point is not whether one makes the work or not... I don't see... why one technique is any more essentially art than another..." This show ushered in a radical new way of presenting ideas and space that did not rely on the artist's hand, but rather on the final result.

McShine, in an effort to broaden appeal and show a wide variety of artists working in this form, included a West Coast contingent and most of the British artists from the "New Generation" show at the Whitechapel Art Gallery from 1965. It appeared that Primary Structures was to be formulated around Anthony Caro's former St. Martin's students, and the American group led by a relatively established Tony Smith.

== 1993 renovation ==
In 1989, a major expansion and renovation project was undertaken at the museum. Upon completion in June 1993, the layout of the Primary Structures show was done away with, and only a few installation shots of the show remain to record the original exhibit and the old galleries.

== Listing ==
=== Sculpture Court/Entry ===
- David Annesley, Swing Low, 1964
- Anthony Caro, Titan, 1964
- Tony Smith, Free Ride, 1962

=== Lobby ===
- Judy Cohen Gerowitz (Judy Chicago), Rainbow Picket, 1966
- Robert Smithson, Cryosphere, 1966

=== Gallery 1 ===
- Dan Flavin, corner monument 4 for those who have been killed in ambush (for Jewish Museum) (for *P.K. who reminded me about death), 1964
- Peter Forakis, JFK, 1963
- Ellsworth Kelly, Blue Disc, 1963
- Forrest Myers, Zygarat & W. & W.W.W., 1965
- Salvatore Romano, Zeno II, 1965
- William Tucker, Meru I, 1964
- William Tucker, Meru II, 1964
- William Tucker, Meru III, 1964–65
- David von Schlegell, Wave, 1964

=== Underpass ===
- Gerald Laing, Indenty, 1966
- Gerald Laing, Trace, 1965
- Tina Matkovic (Spiro), Projection, 1965

=== Gallery 2 ===
- Carl Andre, Lever, 1966
- Lyman Kipp, Andy's Cart Blanche
- Tim Scott, Peach Wheels, 1962
- Richard Van Buren, Free Epton, 1966
- Isaac Witkin, Nagas, 1964

=== Gallery 3 ===
- Tony DeLap, Ka, 1965
- Tom Doyle, Over Owl's Creek, 1966

=== Gallery 4 ===
- Richard Artschwager, Table with Pink Tablecloth, 1964
- Richard Artschwager, Rocker, 1965–75
- Michael Bolus, No. 7, 1965
- Paul Frazier, Pink Split, 1965
- Douglas Huebler, Bradford 2-66, 1966
- John McCracken, Northumberland, 1965
- Peter Phillips, Tricurvular, 1964–65
- Anne Truitt, Sea Garden, 1964

=== Gallery 5 ===
- Ronald Bladen, Three Elements, 1965
- Robert Grosvenor, Transoxiana, 1965
- Donald Judd, Untitled, floor 1966
- Donald Judd, Untitled, wall 1966
- Robert Morris, Untitled (L Beams), 1966–67

=== Gallery 8 ===
- Larry Bell, Untitled(peach)
- Larry Bell, Untitled(pink)
- Larry Bell, Untitled(gold)
- Walter de Maria, Cage, 1961–65
- Sol LeWitt, Untitled, 1966

=== Gallery 10 ===
- Daniel Gorski, Fourth Down
- David Gray, LA/2, 1965
- David Hall, Izzard, 1966
- Phillip King, Through, 1966
- John McCracken, Manchu, 1965
- Peter Pinchbeck, Space Jump
- Michael Todd, Viet, 1966
- Michael Todd, Ball Joint, 1966
- Derrick Woodham, Siviley, 1965
