= Lever (1966) =

Minimalist sculpture

- Artist: Carl Andre
- Year: 1966
- Medium: 137 firebricks
- Dimensions: 11.4 cm × 22.5 cm × 883.9 cm (0.37 ft × 0.74 ft × 28 ft)
- Location: National Gallery of Canada; Ottawa

Lever is a minimalist sculpture by the American artist Carl Andre, from 1966.

Carl Andre, Lever, 1966, 137 firebricks, 11.4 cm × 22.5 cm × 883.9 cm (4.5 in × 8.9 in × 348.0 in) installed

The exhibiting of Lever at Primary Structures brought recognition to Andre. It was subsequently displayed at Dia Beacon.
