= Angola (Witkin) =

1968 outdoor sculpture in Massachusetts, United States

- The sculpture in 2019
- Artist: Isaac Witkin
- Year: 1968
- Medium: Cor-ten steel sculpture
- Location: Cambridge, Massachusetts, U.S.
- 42°21′31.72″N 71°5′21.55″W

Angola is a 1968 Cor-ten steel sculpture by Isaac Witkin, installed on the Massachusetts Institute of Technology (MIT) campus, in Cambridge, Massachusetts, United States.

== See also ==
- 1968 in art
