= Michael Todd (artist) =

Michael Todd (born 1935) is an American artist, based in Southern California since 1968. His work is included in numerous public and private collections, including the Metropolitan Museum of Art Whitney Museum Los Angeles County Museum of Art San Francisco Museum of Modern Art and Storm King Art Center

He is the father of musician Mia Doi Todd.

== Awards ==
- Woodrow Wilson Fellowship
- Fulbright Fellowship

== Exhibitions ==
- Pace Gallery, 1964
- Primary Structures, 1966
- American Sculpture of the Sixties, Los Angeles County Museum of Art, 1967
