= Prairie (sculpture) =

1967 sculpture by Anthony Caro

- Artist: Anthony Caro
- Year: 1967
- Medium: Steel
- Dimensions: 96.5 cm × 582 cm × 320 cm (38 in × 229 in × 126 in)
- Location: Private collection

Prairie is a multi-piece, painted, constructed steel sculpture; created by the British sculptor Anthony Caro, in 1967. It is held in a private collection.

== History and description ==
Prairie was first purchased during its debut at the Kasmin Gallery in London by the Boston-based collector of modern art, Lewis P. Cabot of the Cabot family.

One of the main visual components of the work are the steel rods positioned to give the optical illusion as if one is on a "prairie". Prairie was also the trade name of a dusty shade of yellow paint which colours the sculpture.

Prairie appears on the cover of ArtForum in February 1968; while art historian Michael Fried writing in the same magazine, expressed that [he believes] "Prairie is a masterpiece, one of the great works of modern art, a touchstone for future sculpture". Fried also wrote that "More explicitly than any previous sculpture, Prairie compels us to believe what we see rather than what we know, to accept the witness of the senses against the constructions of the mind."

In an interview of Anthony Caro in the Paris Review, Caro himself said that Prairie was the most abstract sculpture he made.

The sculpture has of 2016 been shown in 12 exhibitions of Caro's work, eight of them held abroad, including five in the United States. Sarah Stanners states that "The international life of Prairie is extensive, especially considering the serious logistics involved in disassembling, shipping, and installing a sculpture [so large]".
