= Equivalent VIII =

Sculpture by Carl Andre

Equivalent VIII, 1966, 120 Firebricks, 5 by 27 by 90 1/4 inches (130 mm × 690 mm × 2,290 mm), occasionally referred to as The Bricks, is the last of a series of minimalist sculptures by Carl Andre. The sculpture consists of 120 fire bricks, arranged in two layers, in a six-by-ten rectangle.

== Description ==
Each of Andre's eight sculptures in the Equivalent series consists of a cuboidal arrangement of 120 firebricks. Although each sculpture is different in horizontal dimensions (length and width), they all have the same vertical dimension (two bricks deep), and the same mass and volume (because they all contain the same number of bricks).

== Sold to the Tate Gallery ==
Constructed in 1966, Equivalent VIII was bought by the Tate Gallery in 1972 for $6,000 (then £2,297), half of the 1966 price. As none of the pieces had been sold during their New York gallery exhibition, Andre had returned the original bricks for a refund so new bricks were bought and shipped to the UK along with instructions on how to arrange them.

== Controversy over the public funding of the purchase ==
When first exhibited at the Tate Gallery at Millbank in 1974 and 1975, it drew no great response. However, in February 1976, when it was not on display, the piece drew much criticism in the press because of the perception that taxpayers' money had been spent on paying an inflated price for a collection of bricks. The bricks were also defaced by Peter Stowell-Phillips, a chef who covered them with blue food dye. The purchase has also been criticised for only buying one of the series of eight arrangements, thus removing the context of their 'equivalence' and for failing to otherwise explain the concept of the piece. The full series would require repurchasing a further 7x120 = 840 bricks, in addition to the 120 already acquired.

The work is now housed in the Tate Modern on Bankside.
