= Jacqueline de la Baume Dürrbach =

French textile artist

- Born: Marguerite Marie Françoise Jacqueline Renom de la Baume; 14 May 1920; 7th arrondissement of Paris, France
- Died: 14 March 1990 (aged 69); Saint-Rémy-de-Provence, Bouches-du-Rhône, France

Marguerite Marie Françoise Jacqueline Renom de la Baume Dürrbach (14 May 1920 – 14 March 1990) was a French textile artist. She is best known for having co-created the tapestry of Pablo Picasso's Guernica that has hung at the United Nations since 1985.

== Early life and education ==
De la Baume Dürrbach was the daughter of Count Robert Renom de la Baume, the French ambassador to Spain and Switzerland during the Second World War. She studied drawing and sculpture at the Académie Julian, Paris. There, she met husband René Dürrbach, whom she married around 1949. In 1949, she undertook an apprenticeship in tapestry with Beaudounet in Paris, who was a master of Aubusson tapestry. She dedicated herself entirely to tapestry, making contact with contemporary painters such as Albert Gleizes, Herbin, Léger, Villon and, through their widows, Delaunay and Van Doesburg.

== Career ==
In 1950, de la Baume Dürrbach had her first exhibitions of her tapestries in Paris.

In 1948, she collaborated with Pablo Picasso to create a woven tapestry representing his painting Les Demoiselles d'Avignon. In 1951 they collaborated again, this time to create a tapestry of his 1920 work Pierrot and Harlequin.

In 1955, Picasso, Jaqueline and her husband René Dürrbach worked together to create a tapestry version of Picasso's anti-war painting Guernica. They also jointly created a 3.50 x 7.10 metre gouache painting as a study for the Guernica tapestry.

In 1957 she created a tapestry of Picasso's Deux Harlequins painting.

== Collections ==
De la Baume's collaboration with the painter Albert Gleizes is held in the permanent collection of the Denver Art Museum, United States. One of three copies of the Guernica tapestry she made in collaboration with Picasso is included in the collection of the Museum of Modern Art, Gunma, Japan.
