= Tim Caro =

British evolutionary ecologist

Timothy M. Caro (born 1951) is a British evolutionary ecologist known for his work on conservation biology, animal behaviour, anti-predator defences in animals, and the function of zebra stripes. He is the author of several textbooks on these subjects.

== Life ==
Caro was born in 1951 to artists Anthony Caro and Sheila Girling. Caro gained his bachelor's degree in zoology at Cambridge University in 1973, and his doctorate in psychology at the University of St Andrews in 1979. He was a professor of wildlife biology at University of California, Davis, in the departments of population biology and wildlife and fish conservation biology. He is currently a professor of biology at the University of Bristol. He has studied the colour polymorphism of coconut crabs, the conservation of fragments of forest, and the function of coloration in mammals, especially zebra stripes.

=== How the zebra got its stripes ===
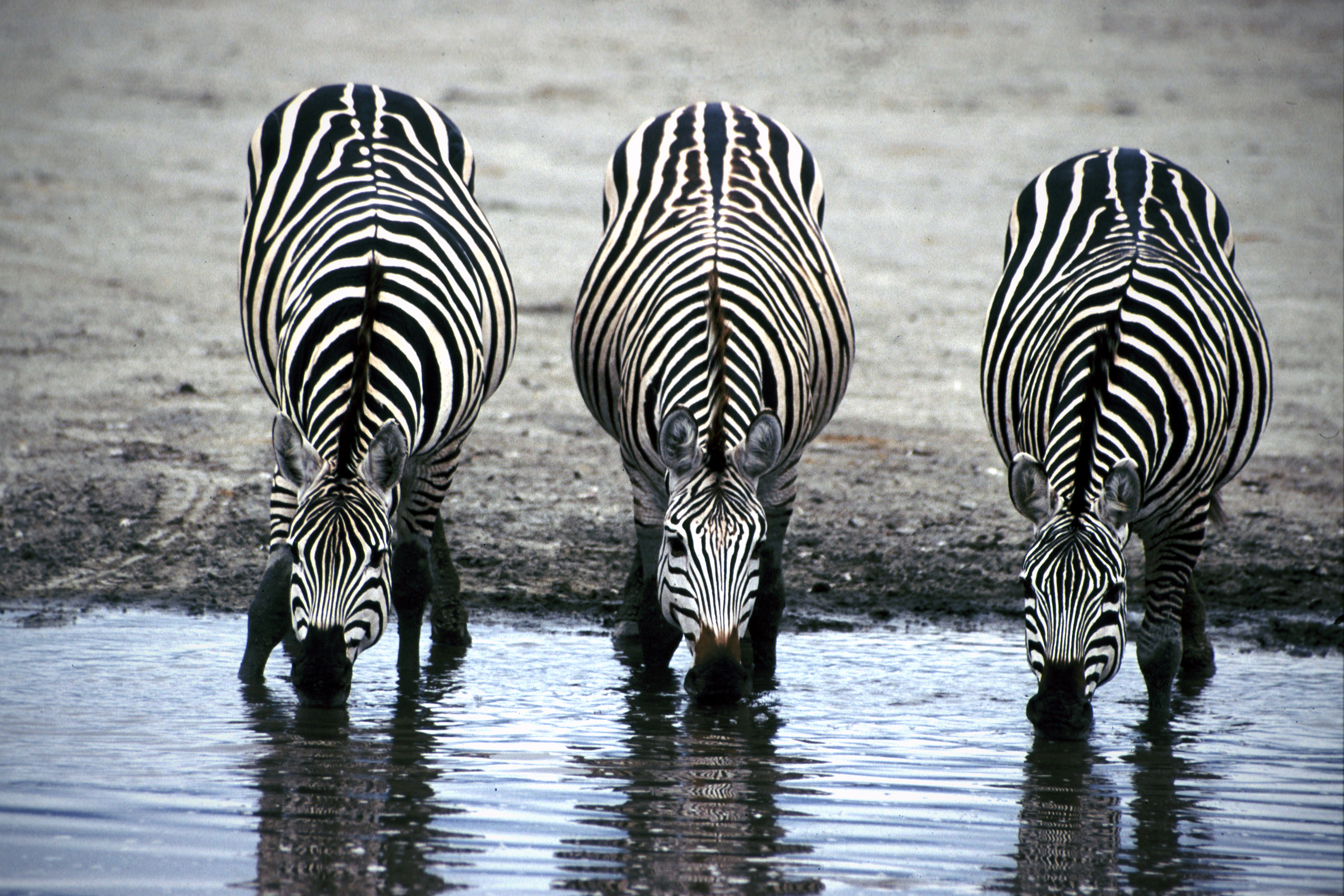
Caro investigated some 18 hypotheses to explain why zebras are striped, excluding all but one of them through experimental studies.

Caro's team found evidence that zebra stripes help to reduce biting by tabanid flies, but no reliable support for traditionally held hypotheses about the function of zebra stripes including camouflage, predator avoidance, heat management, or social interaction. He evaluated 18 different proposed explanations for the stripes, devising and carrying out quantitative tests to compare them. The evolutionary ecologist Tim Birkhead, writing in the Times Higher Education, praised Caro's 2006 book Zebra Stripes as "an exemplary study", calling it "one long argument", a phrase used by Darwin of his On the Origin of Species, summarising it as "in essence a 300-page scientific paper". Karin Brulliard, writing in The Washington Post under the headline "To figure out why the zebra got its stripes, this researcher dressed up like one", portrays Caro in a zebra costume "not used in his fieldwork", but also in a tailor-made striped suit in the Tanzanian bush, as well as in pelts of zebra and the unstriped wildebeest. The newspaper reports Caro as "absolutely convinced" that he has found the right explanation. Matthew Cobb, writing in New Scientist, recalls Rudyard Kipling's children's book, Just So Stories, in which the zebra got his stripes by standing half-in, half-out of the shadows "with the slippery-slidy shadows of the trees" on his body. Cobb calls Zebra Stripes a marvellous book and predicts it will encourage a generation to "tackle evolutionary biology's remaining enigmas, with or without the help of Kipling." Michael Lemonick, writing in The New Yorker echoed the just-so-story theme.

== Works ==
- Caro, Tim (1994). Cheetahs of the Serengeti Plains: Group Living in an Asocial Species. University of Chicago Press.
- Caro, Tim (1998). Behavioral Ecology and Conservation Biology. Oxford University Press.
- Caro, Tim (2005). Antipredator Defenses in Birds and Mammals. University of Chicago Press.
- Caro, Tim (2010). Conservation by Proxy: Indicator, Umbrella, Keystone, Flagship, and Other Surrogate Species. Island Press.
- Caro, Tim (2016). Zebra Stripes. University of Chicago Press.
