= Tony DeLap =

American sculptor (1927–2019)

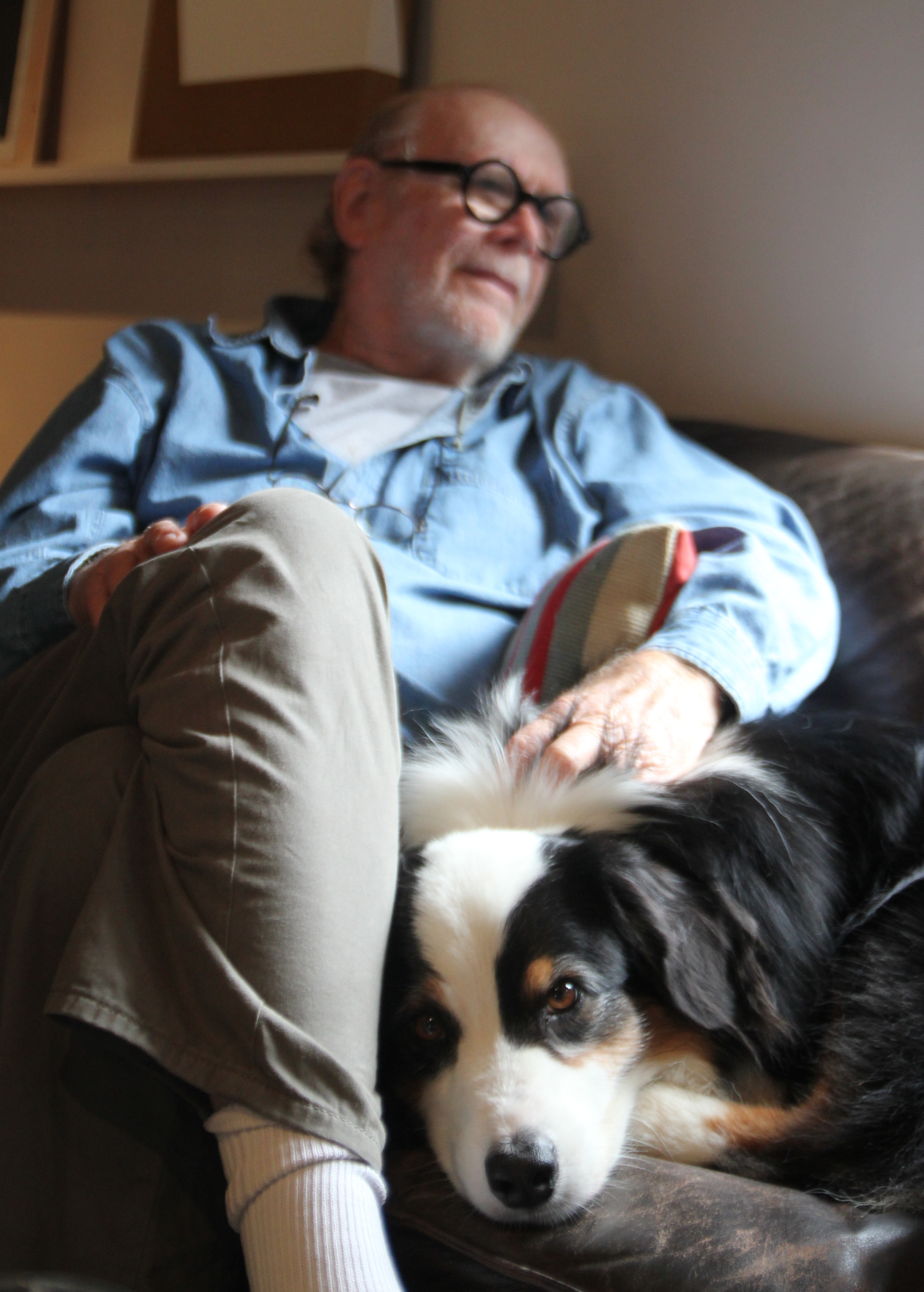
- DeLap with "Gorky" at home in Corona del Mar, CA
- Born: November 4, 1927; Oakland, California, U.S.
- Died: May 29, 2019 (aged 91)
- Education: California College of the Arts, Academy of Art San Francisco, Claremont Graduate University
- Occupation: Artist
- Spouse: Kathy DeLap
- Website: www.tonydelap.com

Tony DeLap (November 4, 1927 – May 29, 2019) was a West Coast artist, known for his abstract sculpture utilizing illusionist techniques and meticulous craftsmanship. As a pioneer of West Coast minimalism and Op Art, DeLap's oeuvre is a testament to his willingness to continuously challenge the viewer's perception of reality.

== Early career ==
Born in 1927 in Oakland, DeLap grew up in the Bay Area and studied art, illustration, and graphic design at several Bay Area colleges, including the San Francisco Academy of Art, and he also attended the Claremont Colleges in Southern California. He returned to the Bay Area, where he taught at the California College of Arts and Crafts, the San Francisco Art Institute and at UC Davis until he secured a teaching position at the newly founded campus of the University of California, Irvine. Michael Asher, Bruce Nauman, James Turrell and John McCracken studied with DeLap.

Along with artists such as Ellsworth Kelly, DeLap followed a path of Geometric abstraction and Minimal art embracing the principles of limited color, geometry, precise craftsmanship, and intellectual rigor. Since the early 1960s, he was associated with an emerging movement of West Coast minimalism referred to as "finish fetish," along with several other artists including Craig Kauffman, Larry Bell, and DeWain Valentine.

== Career ==
DeLap's work has been widely exhibited both nationally and internationally. Along with numerous solo exhibitions, DeLap was included in several important group exhibitions of the 1960s including; Primary Structures at the Jewish Museum; American Sculpture of the Sixties at the Los Angeles County Museum of Art; and The Responsive Eye at The Museum of Modern Art, New York City. He died on May 29, 2019, at the age of 91.

== Collections ==
DeLap's work is in many private and public collections, including the San Jose Museum of Art; the Los Angeles County Museum of Art; the Museum of Contemporary Art, San Diego; the San Francisco Museum of Modern Art; the Whitney Museum of American Art; The Museum of Modern Art; the Solomon R. Guggenheim Museum, New York; the Walker Art Center in Minneapolis; and The Tate Gallery, London, among others. In 2018, the Laguna Art Museum mounted a major retrospective of DeLap’s work dating from 1961 to present, curated by Peter Frank and was accompanied by a fully illustrated publication.

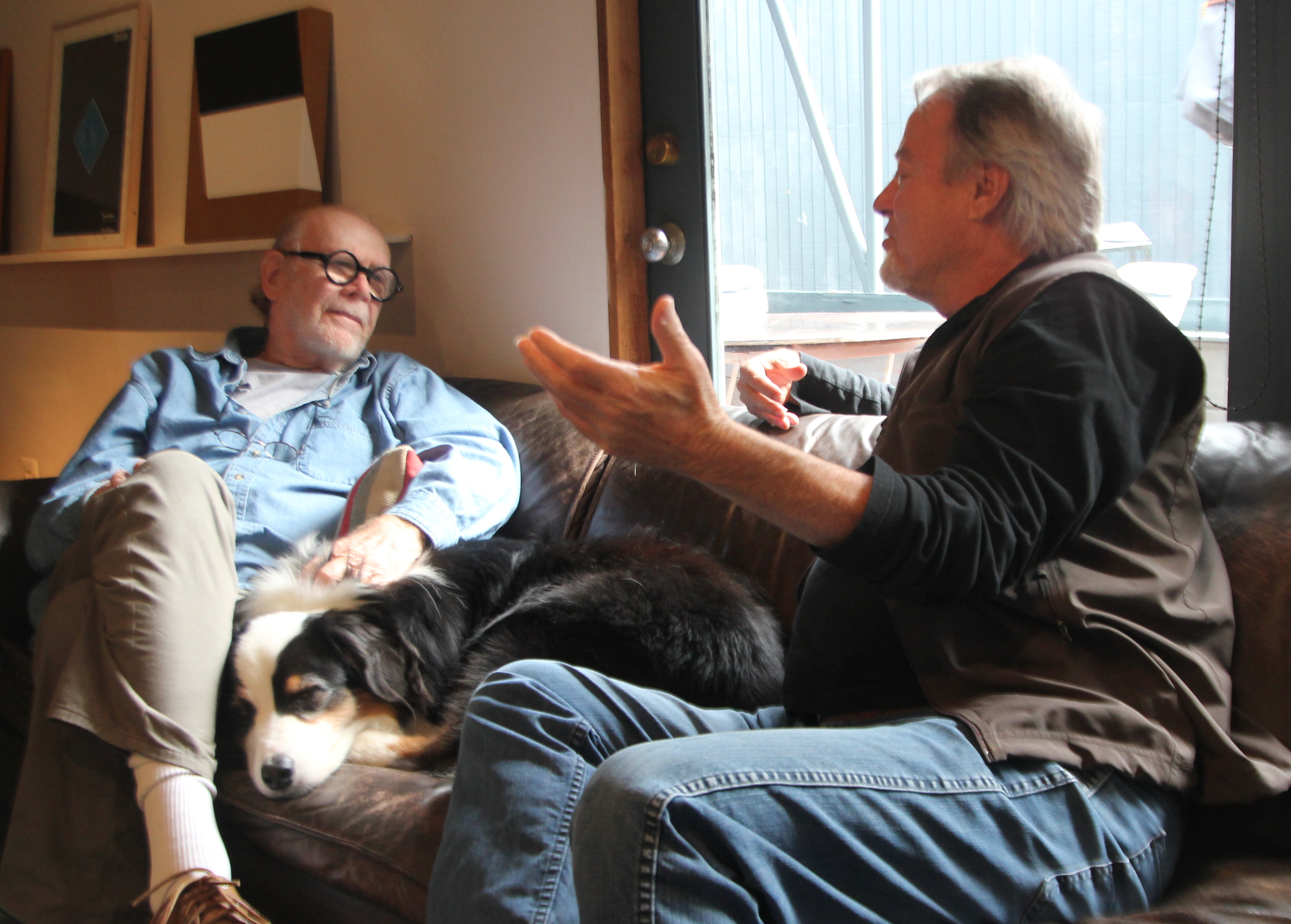
DeLap and Mentalist Mark Edward, 2015
