= Pierrot and Harlequin =

Painting by Paul Cézanne

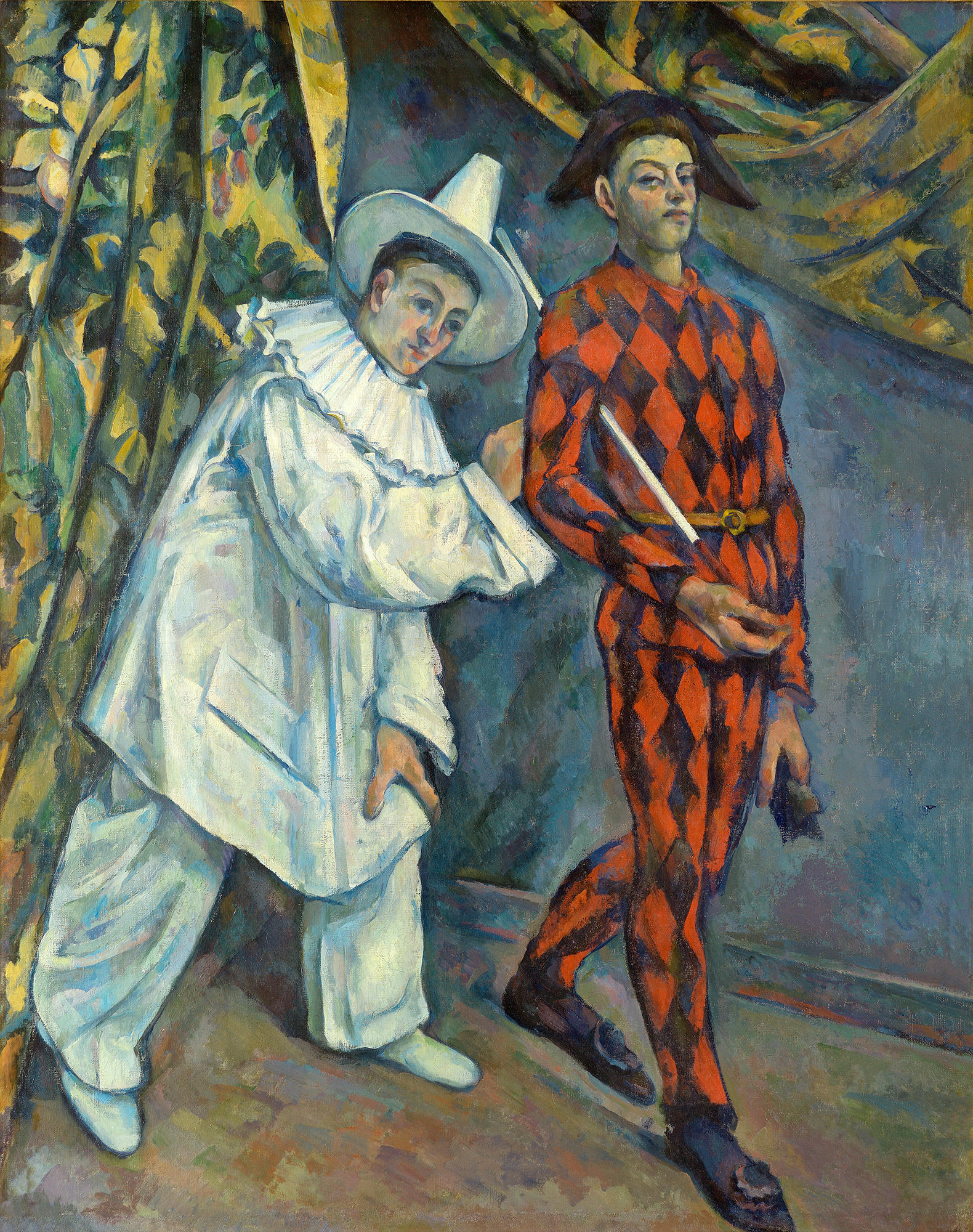
- Artist: Paul Cézanne
- Year: 1888-90
- Medium: oil on canvas
- Dimensions: 102 cm × 81 cm (40 in × 32 in)
- Location: Pushkin Museum, Moscow

Pierrot and Harlequin or Mardi Gras is an 1888–1890 oil on canvas painting by Paul Cézanne, now in the Pushkin Museum in Moscow. As the title suggests, it shows the commedia dell'arte characters Pierrot and Harlequin.

It was in Victor Chocquet's collection from 1890 to 1899 before being bought by Paul Durand-Ruel, who kept it until 1904, when it was bought by Sergei Shchukin. It was seized by the Soviet state with the rest of Shchukin's collection upon the October Revolution and assigned in 1918 to the 2nd Museum of Modern Eastern Painting, which merged with the 2nd Museum of Modern Eastern Painting in 1924 to form the State Museum of Modern Western Art, where the work remained until that museum closed in 1948, then it moved to its present residence in the Pushkin Museum in Moscow.

== See also ==
- List of paintings by Paul Cézanne
