= Melissa Kretschmer =

American contemporary artist (born 1962)

Melissa Kretschmer (born 1962) is an American contemporary artist known for her hybrid sculpture/painting works. She has exhibited extensively both nationally and internationally. She lives and works in New York City.

== Education and work ==
Kretschmer received a MFA and BFA from the ArtCenter College of Design in Pasadena, California.

Over the course of 25 years, Kretschmer has maintained a rigorous practice of producing deceptively minimal paintings. Her works have been compared to valentines, reliquaries and hermetically sealed vaults. Kretschmer makes use of a variety of materials and techniques that work to redefine formal preconceptions associated with painting as a medium. Vellum, gesso, gouache, plywood and beeswax are among the materials Kretschmer inventively employs. Joining such materials to one another in the manner of collage, her process is one based in both improvisation and meticulousness. These fragments are often measured to a fraction of an inch, but Kretschmer firmly pushes back against precision in favor of accuracy. All of such deliberate gestures work to play with the experience of looking, and play with the viewer's perception of flatness and dimensionality. In 1992 her work was included in the exhibition Slow Art: Painting in New York Now at MoMA PS1.

== Painting After Postmodernism: Belgium-USA ==
In 2016 Kretschmer's work was included in the group exhibition Painting After Postmodernism: Belgium-USA, curated by art historian, filmmaker, and curator Barbara Rose. The exhibition featured sixteen painters—half of them Americans, half Belgians, and was mounted at the historic Vanderborght building and Cinéma Galeries in Brussels. In this extensive survey, accompanied by a catalogue, Rose sought to encourage exchange and assert the need for a new discussion surrounding the condition of contemporary painting. The American painters, including Larry Poons and Ed Moses, were primarily older, more established artists associated with Rose since the late 1960s in New York when a Clement Greenberg's "post-painterly" abstraction was giving way to multiform "pluralism." Kretschmer and artist Martin Kline represented the relatively younger generation of process/image painters embodying the inheritance of this turn. For her work in the show, multiple pieces in a range of sizes, Kretschmer garnered considerable attention with one critic going so far to say that "stole the show." In The New Criterion, Karen Wilkin described the experience of viewing Kretschmer's works in the exhibition:

At the other end of the spectrum were Melissa Kretschmer's pale, delicate constructed paintings, built of wood, vellum, gesso, and gouache. From a distance, across the generous spaces of the Vanderborght, Kretschmer's constructions read as elegant meditations on interval and proportion, enacted by horizontal expanses subdivided and punctuated by slender vertical bands of restrained color. As we approached, we realized the complexity of these subtle works, which proved to depend on shifts in level, both excavated and built up, so that our perception of the colored bars was altered by changes in plane. With closer inspection, we discovered nuances of surface, fragile edges, and evidence of aggressive manipulation of materials. Kretschmer's work spoke quietly, slowly declaring its presence among more raucous neighbors and more than holding its own.

== Catalogues ==
- Rose, Barbara. Inside Out – Martin Kline and Melissa Kretschmer, Paul Rodgers / 9W, 2016.
- Rose, Barbara and Timothy A. Eaton. Anti Icon, Eaton Fine Art, Inc., 2010.
- Swanson, Dean and Martin Friedman. LEWITT X 2, Madison Museum of Contemporary Art, 2006.
- Wei, Lilly. Glass, Seriously, Dorsky Gallery, April 2005.
- Due, 1000eventi, Milan, February 2005.
- Melissa Kretschmer, Kunst-Station Sankt Peter Köln, 2003.
- Melissa Kretschmer/Carl Andre: A Conversation, Galerie Frank, Paris, 1999.
- Campbell, James D. Images/After Images: More Than Meets the Eye, Work Space Gallery, 1996.
- Harris, Mark. Material Abuse, Trans Hudson Gallery, 1995.
