= Sheila Girling =

British artist (1924–2015)

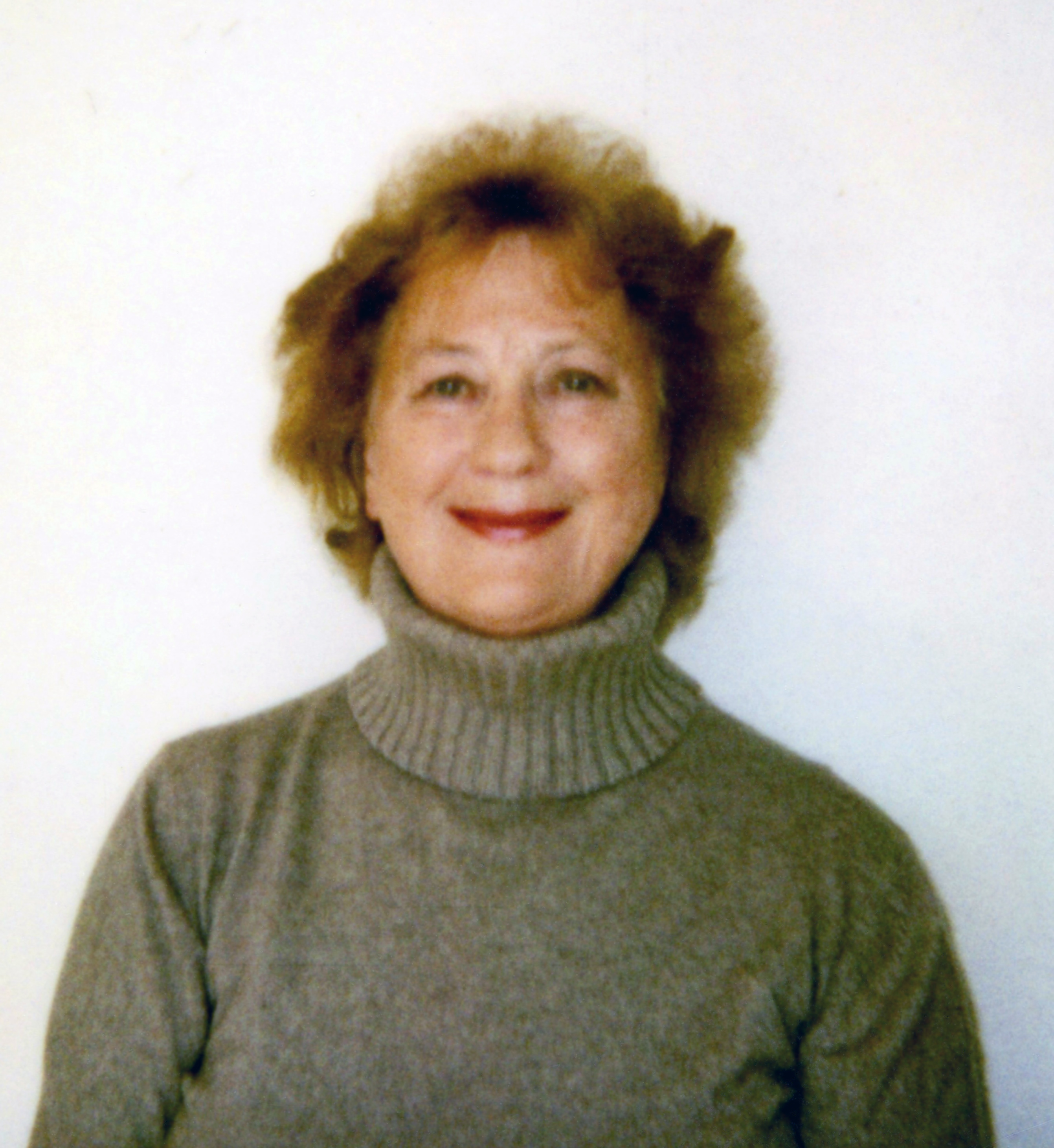
Sheila Girling

Sheila May Girling, Lady Caro (1 July 1924 – 14 February 2015) was a British artist who worked across painting, collage and clay. She was one of the first British artists to use acrylic mediums and is known for working directly on the floor to immerse herself in the space of her canvases. Girling was married to the sculptor Sir Anthony Caro.

Girling was born in Birmingham and studied at the Royal Academy. Her first solo exhibitions were in Canada, but she exhibited widely in Britain and the United States. Her works are in the collections of the Yale Center for British Art (New Haven), Insitut Valencià d’Art Modern (IVAM, Valencia) and the Royal Collection Trust (London), as well as in many private collections across the world.

== Biography ==
Sheila May Girling was born in Erdington, Birmingham on 1 July 1924. Her father, Cyril Stanley Frank Girling, was an engineer working for Dunlop Tyre Company and her mother was Beatrice May (née Harvey). Many of her family members had been painters, including her paternal grandfather, uncle and aunt. Her grandfather was also an art dealer in London, who allegedly would deal in fakes and create forgeries at his studio.

Girling studied at the Birmingham School of Art from 1941-1944 and from 1947 trained at Royal Academy Schools, London. After graduating, Girling moved into a studio in the 'Italian Village' on the Fulham Road in London, designed by artist and architect Mario Manenti. On 17 December 1947, she married Sir Anthony Caro, whom she had met as a university art student. They had two sons together: Timothy a zoologist; and Paul, a painter.

She paused her art career to focus on raising them, however she took an active role in the career of her husband, advising him and selecting the colour of Early One Morning (1962) and of the Perspex disc in Blue Moon (2013), amongst others. When she returned to large-scale painting in the 1970s, she began to focus on abstraction.

In 1963 Girling and Caro moved to Vermont, where Girling developed close relationships with the Colour Field painters and reformulated what her practice was and could be. In 1965 the couple returned to England to a vibrant arts scene and raised their two sons. Over this period, Girling developed close relationships with the Colour Field painters Kenneth Noland, Helen Frankenthaler and Jules Olitski. As Girling wrote, ‘The artist Kenneth Noland, who became a friend, showed me acrylic paints, which I'd never seen used before. I learned how to mix them and saw what you could do with them. All the time I kept in touch’.

Alongside being an accomplished and experimental painter, Girling also produced a substantial body of works in clay. These abstract collage slabs were made in Syracuse, New York during a clay workshop with ceramicist Margie Hughto in 1978. Rather than putting pigment on the clay, Girling broke with tradition and put pigment into the clay, which was then layered and pressed together.

As her career progressed and her body of work rapidly grew, Girling caught the attention of Acquavella Contemporary Art (Acquavella Galleries) in New York, who specialised in the works of the French Impressionists as well as in the works of modern and contemporary artists such as Lucian Freud, Henri Matisse and Joan Miro. Acquavella also represented her husband Anthony Caro.

In 1982 Girling set up Triangle Artist Workshop with Caro, philanthropist Robert Loder and curator Terry Fenton. Triangle Workshop was an artistic network that connected abstract painters and sculptors across continents. Here, Girling developed her collage painting technique that makes-up her late body of work.

In the late 1990s Girling began making smaller collage works on canvas and paper, alongside her established large-scale collage paintings. In the later half of her career, her works moved towards figuration, often sitting at the boundary between abstraction and representation.

From the early 1970s until the end of her life, Girling worked from her studio in Camden Town.

Girling died of heart disease, at her home in Frognal, on 14 February 2015, aged 90.

== Exhibitions ==
Girling exhibited extensively throughout her life, beginning at the Royal Academy Summer Exhibition in 1950.

Her first solo show was held in 1978 at Edmonton Art Gallery, Alberta, titled Watercolour Landscapes. The show toured to Calgary Art Gallery, Alberta and Everson Museum of Art Syracuse, New York.

Throughout the late 1970s and early 1980s Girling took part in numerous solo and group exhibitions at major venues including Camden Art Gallery, Warwick Arts Trust, Acquavella Contemporary Art, The Royal Academy and Francis Graham Dixon Gallery.

In 2006 the first international retrospective of her work, Sheila Girling: Retrospective, was held at Insitut Valencià d’Art Modern (IVAM Museum), Valencia. In 2007 the exhibition Anthony Caro and Sheila Girling opened at Roche Court, Salisbury, celebrating what Girling and Caro called a ‘64-year conversation about art’. Then in 2015, after her death, a retrospective of her work was held at Annely Juda Fine Art.

To mark the centenary of her birth in 2024, The Art and Life of Sheila Girling opened at Space to Breathe, Bowhouse, Fife, curated by Former Director of Sotheby's Impressionist and Modern Art Department Sophie Camu and her husband, the documentary photographer and Girling’s former neighbour at Frognal, Alexander Lindsay.

== Books ==
- Westley, Hannah (2008). Sheila Girling. Aldershot, Hampshire: Lund Humphries.
- Westley, Hannah (2007). Sheila Girling: Paintings. Wiltshire: Roche Court Sculpture Park.
- Sue Hubbard and Conseulo Císcar Casabán (2006). Sheila Girling. Valencia: IVAM Institut Valencià d'Art Modern.
