= Grid format =

The grid format has been an important component of avant-garde visual art throughout the 20th century and into the 21st century. Early appearances of the grid format include work by Piet Mondrian, Kazimir Malevich and other artists belonging to the De Stijl and Constructivist movements. The grid format also features prominently in minimalist and conceptual art of the 60's and 70's. The art theorist Rosalind Krauss writes,

"In the temporal dimension, the grid is an emblem of modernity by being just that: the form that is ubiquitous in the art of our century, while appearing nowhere, nowhere at all, in the art of the last one. In that great chain of reactions by which modernism was born out of the efforts of the nineteenth century, one final shift resulted in breaking the chain. By "discovering" the grid, cubism, de Stijl, Mondrian, Malevich . .. landed in a place that was out of reach of everything that went before. Which is to say, they landed in the present, and everything else was declared to be the past."

Other notable occurrences of the grid format include Sol Lewitt's modular structures, Chuck Close's photorealist grids and more recently in Damien Hirst's Spot Paintings. Other contemporary artists such as Penelope Umbrico have used it to imply non-hierarchical organization in massive collections of objects.
