= Anthony Caro =

English sculptor (1924–2013)

Sir Anthony Caro OM CBE
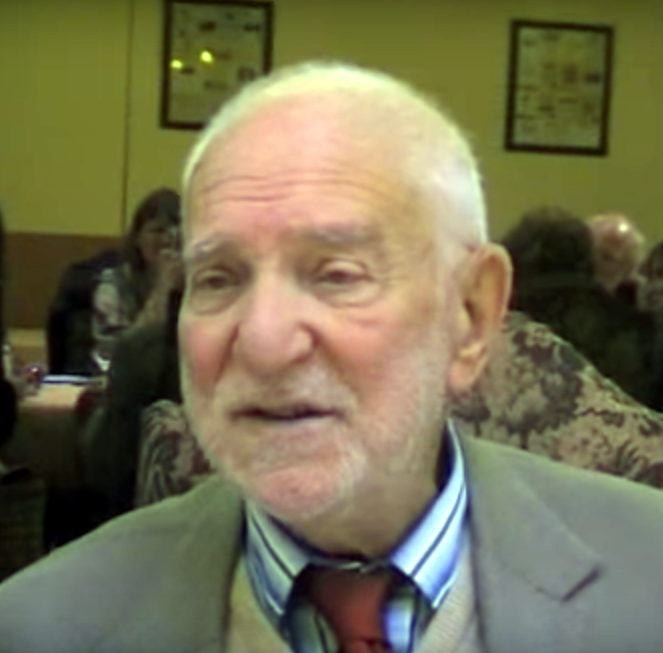
- Anthony Caro
- Born: Anthony Alfred Caro; 8 March 1924; New Malden, Surrey, England
- Died: 23 October 2013 (aged 89); London, England
- Education: Regent Street Polytechnic
- Known for: Sculpture, drawing
- Notable work: Twenty Four Hours (1960); Early One Morning (1962); Prairie (1967)
- Movement: Constructed steel sculpture, abstract art, modernism
- Spouse(s): Sheila Girling (m. 1949); 2 children
- Awards: CBE (1969); Knight Bachelor (1987); Praemium Imperiale (1992); Commander of the Order of Arts and Letters (1996); ISC Lifetime Achievement Award (1997); Order of Merit (2000)
- Website: www.anthonycaro.org

Sir Anthony Alfred Caro OM CBE (8 March 1924 – 23 October 2013) was an English abstract sculptor whose work is characterised by assemblages of metal using 'found' and industrial objects. He began as a member of the modernist school, having worked with Henry Moore early in his career. He was lauded as the greatest British sculptor of his generation.

== Early life and education ==
Anthony Caro was born in New Malden, Surrey, England to a Jewish family and was the youngest of three children.

When Caro was three, his father, a stockbroker, moved the family to a farm in Churt, Surrey. Caro was educated at Charterhouse School, where his housemaster introduced him to British sculptor Charles Wheeler. During holidays, he studied at the Farnham School of Art (now the University for the Creative Arts) and worked in Wheeler's studio

When he left school he spent a brief period in an architect's office in Guildford drawing plans, which he did not take to, so his father suggested he study engineering. He later earned a degree in engineering at Christ's College, Cambridge.

In 1946, after time in the Royal Navy, he studied sculpture at the Regent Street Polytechnic before pursuing further studies at the Royal Academy Schools from 1947 until 1952.

== Work ==
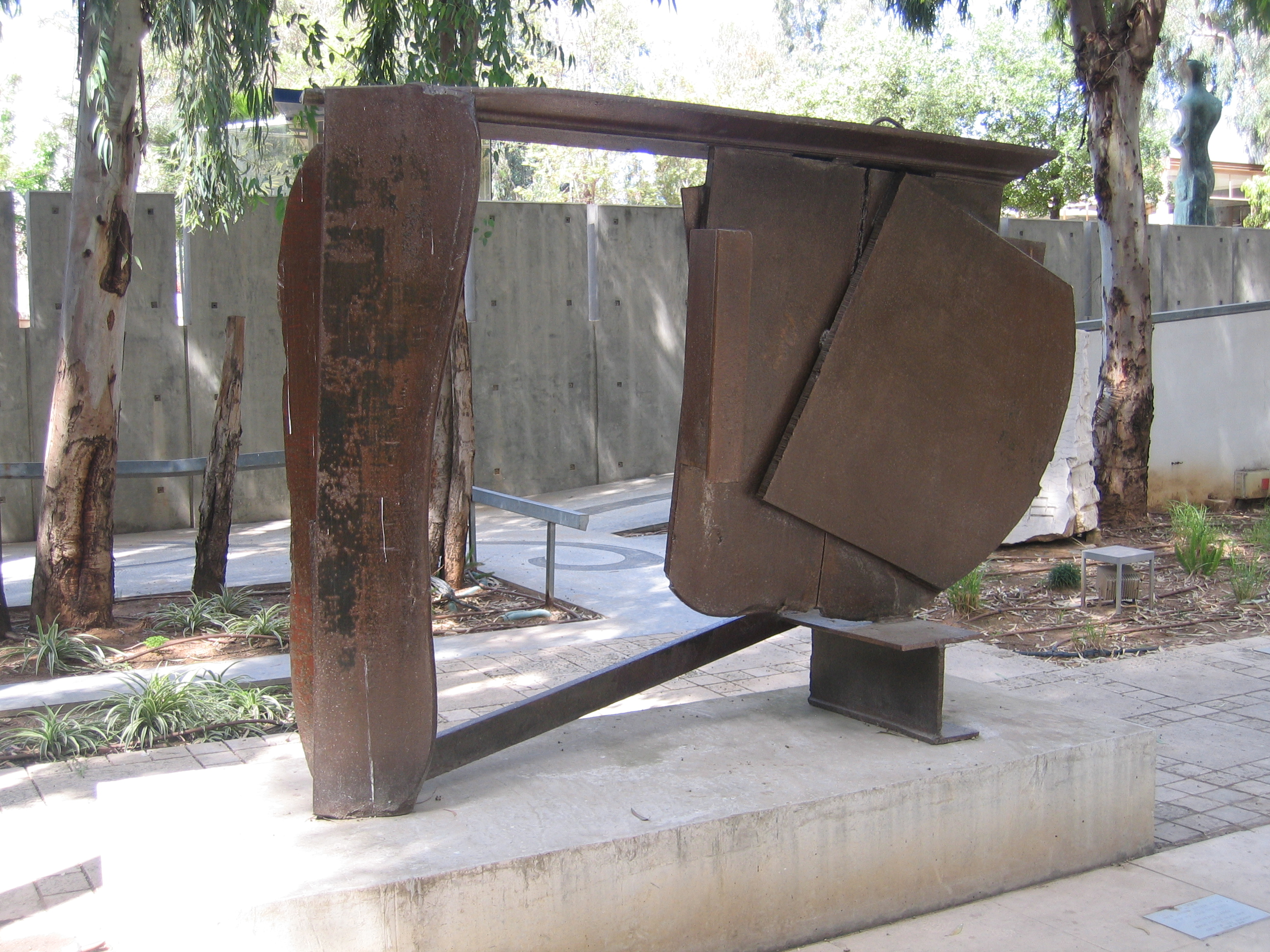
Black Cover Flat (1974), steel, Tel Aviv Museum of Art

Anthony Caro encountered modernism at art school, and when working as a studio assistant to Henry Moore from 1951 to 1953. In 1955 he exhibited two sculptures in the group exhibition New Painters and Painter-Sculptors at the Institute of Contemporary Art, London and in 1956 he had his first solo show at Galleria del Naviglio in Milan.

In 1959 Caro was awarded a Ford Foundation scholarship to undertake a research trip to the United States of America, which radically changed his approach to sculpture. During this trip he met the critic Clement Greenberg, as well as the colour field painters Kenneth Noland, Helen Frankenthaler and Robert Motherwell, for the first time. After being introduced to the American sculptor David Smith, he abandoned his earlier figurative work and started constructing sculptures by welding or bolting together pieces of steel such as I-beams, steel plates and meshes. Twenty Four Hours (1960), in Tate Britain since 1975, is one of his earliest abstract sculptures in painted steel. Often the finished piece was then painted in a bold flat colour.

Caro found international success in the late 1950s. He is often credited with the significant innovation of removing the sculpture from its plinth, building upon the steps David Smith and Constantin Brâncuși had taken. Caro's sculptures are usually self-supporting and sit directly on the floor. In doing so, they remove a barrier between the work and the viewer, who is invited to approach and interact with the sculpture from all sides.

In 1963 Caro moved to Bennington, Vermont, where he made a body of abstract, brightly coloured sculptures, including Slow Movement (1965), which is now part of the Arts Council Collection. In 1964 he opened his first exhibition in New York at the Andre Emmerich Gallery, showcasing these bold new works.

From 1970 onwards, Caro began to make sculptures in rusted, then varnished or waxed, steel. In 1972 he made a significant series of sculptures at Ripamonte Factory in Veduggio, which included fourteen new works in soft edge roll end steel. This way of working continued, and from 1974 to 1976 Caro worked at York Steel Company Factory in Toronto, where he produced 37 large-scale sculptures later known as the Flats series.

In 1978, Caro was commissioned to design a sculpture for architect I M Pei's new East Wing building of the National Gallery, Washington, DC. This sculpture, National Gallery Ledge Piece (1978), was architectural in scale and installed in situ.

In 1980, Caro was working towards an exhibition of British abstract art in South African townships when he met Robert Loder. In 1981, when staying in New York State, the pair, alongside curator Terry Fenton and painter and wife of Caro Sheila Girling, developed the idea of running workshops for professional artists, which became the Triangle Arts Trust. They held the first Triangle workshop in 1982 for thirty sculptors and painters from the US, the UK and Canada at Pine Plains, New York.

Caro's work changed direction in the 1980s with the introduction of more literal elements, with a series of figures drawn from classical Greece. After visiting Greece in 1985, and closely studying classical friezes, he embarked on a series of large-scale narrative works, including After Olympia, a panorama more than 23 metres (75 ft) long, inspired by the temple to Zeus at Olympia. Another large scale installation piece, Sea Music, stands on the quay at Poole, Dorset.

In the early 2000s, his work featured nearly life-size equestrian figures built from fragments of wood and terra cotta on gymnasts' vaulting horses. In 2008, Caro opened his "Chapel of Light" installation in the Saint Jean-Baptiste Church of Bourbourg (France), a permanent sculptural installation made between 2001 and 2008 that is integrated into the architecture of the church. In 2008 he also exhibited four figurative head sculptures at the National Portrait Gallery, London. In 2011 the Metropolitan Museum of Art installed five works by Caro on their rooftop. As of 2012, Caro was working on an immense, multipart sculpture that would occupy three blocks of Midtown Park Avenue.

=== Teaching ===
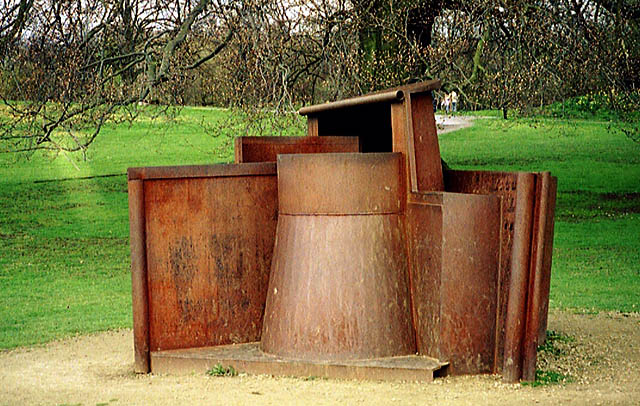
Dream City (1996), rusted steel, at the Yorkshire Sculpture Park

Caro was also a tutor at Saint Martin's School of Art in London from 1953 to 1981, inspiring a younger generation of British abstract sculptors, led by former students and assistants including Phillip King, Tim Scott, William G. Tucker, Peter Hide, and Richard Deacon; as well as a reaction group including Bruce McLean, Barry Flanagan, Richard Long, David Hall and Gilbert & George. He and several former students were asked to join the seminal 1966 show at the Jewish Museum in New York titled, Primary Structures representing the British influence on the "New Art". Caro taught at Bennington College from 1963 to 1965, along with painter Jules Olitski and sculptor David Smith.

=== Architecture and design ===
Caro also collaborated with celebrated architects, notably Frank Gehry, with whom he constructed a wooden village in New York in 1987, Norman Foster and I M Pei.

To mark the millennium, Caro worked with British architects Foster + Partners and engineers Arup to design the Millennium Bridge.This involved working with Norman Foster and the engineer Chris Wise, to design the London Millennium Footbridge spanning the Thames between St. Paul's Cathedral and the Tate Modern. The bridge opened in June 2000 and 100,000 people crossed it in the first weekend, and it has since become an iconic part of London's skyline and resulted in changes to codes for bridge building worldwide.

== Exhibitions ==
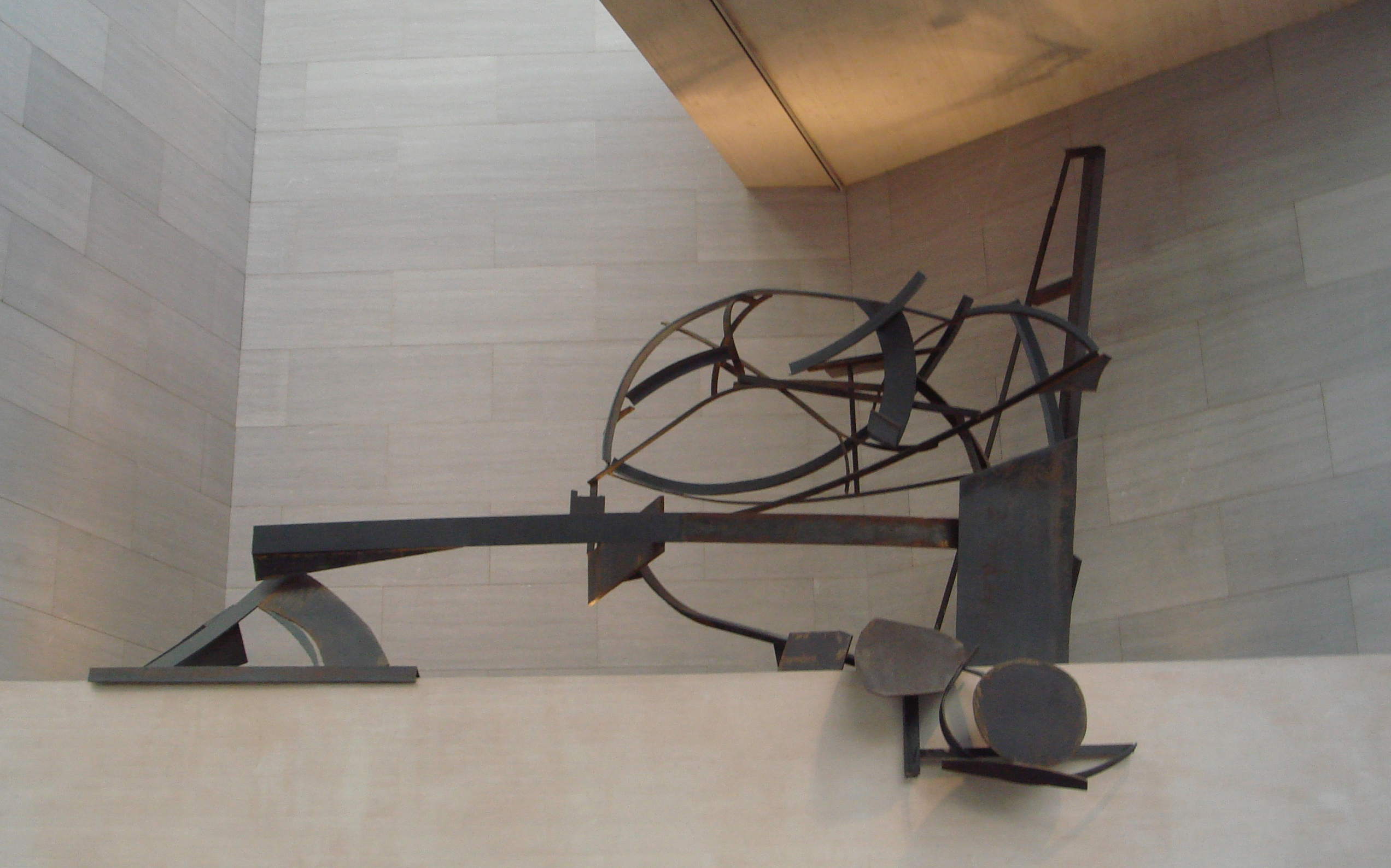
National Gallery Ledge Piece, 1978, welded steel, by Anthony Caro

Since the 1950s, Caro's work has been shown in museums and galleries worldwide.

His first solo exhibition was at the Galleria del Naviglio in Milan in 1956, and his first solo show in London was at the Gimpel Fils Gallery the next year. Another solo show was a pivotal exhibition at the Whitechapel Art Gallery in 1963. In 1967 Caro began exhibiting regularly with Kasmin in London, and in 1969, he began showing with André Emmerich in New York. In the same year he showed at the São Paulo Biennale with John Hoyland.

In 2004, to honour his 80th birthday, Tate Britain and Kenwood House held exhibitions of his work. Therein at his 1967 premier showing at the Kasmin gallery, included in the works exhibited was the seminal multi-piece painted steel sculpture Prairie which employs visual illusionism. Of this sculpture the American art historian Michael Fried reviewing the exhibition in ArtForum said that ..."I believe that Prairie is a masterpiece, one of the great works of modern art, a touchstone for future sculpture"...

Caro's museum exhibitions include "Anthony Caro: A Retrospective" at the Museum of Modern Art, New York (1975, travelled to Walker Art Center, Minneapolis, Museum of Fine Arts, Houston, and Museum of Fine Arts, Boston); "Anthony Caro", Museum of Contemporary Art, Tokyo (1995); "Anthony Caro", Tate Britain, London (2005); three museums in Pas-de-Calais, France (2008), to accompany the opening of his Chapel of Light at Bourbourg; and "Anthony Caro on the Roof", Metropolitan Museum of Art, New York (2011). In 2012 the Yale Center for British Art presented "Caro: Close Up".

From 1 June to 27 October 2013 in connection with the 55th Venice Biennale, he exhibited at the Museo Correr, Venice, Italy. The exhibit was on at the time of his death.

== Art market ==
Caro highest selling sculpture in the art market was Sculpture Two (1962), who sold by £1.4 million ($2.45 million) at Sotheby's London, in February 2006.

== Recognition ==
Caro was appointed Commander of the Order of the British Empire (CBE) in the 1969 New Year Honours. He was knighted in the 1987 Birthday Honours and received the Order of Merit in May 2000. He also was appointed Commandeur des Arts et des Lettres in 1996. He was awarded many prizes, including the Praemium Imperiale for Sculpture in Tokyo in 1992 and the Lifetime Achievement Award for Sculpture in 1997.

== Personal life ==
In 1949, Caro married the painter Sheila Girling and they had two sons together: Timothy (born 1951), a zoologist; and Paul (born 1958), a painter.

== Death ==
Caro was 89 when he died of a heart attack on 23 October 2013. He was lauded as a "gentle man with a pioneering spirit" by BBC arts editor Will Gompertz and "one of the greatest sculptors in the second half of the twentieth century" by Royal Academy of Arts chief executive Charles Saumarez Smith. He is buried in the churchyard of Worth Matravers, Dorset. Michael Fried remarked on his passing, "he was a life force of extraordinary magnitude and generosity, and simply calling him to mind is, and is likely to remain, a source of joy."
