= William G. Tucker =

British sculptor

William Tucker
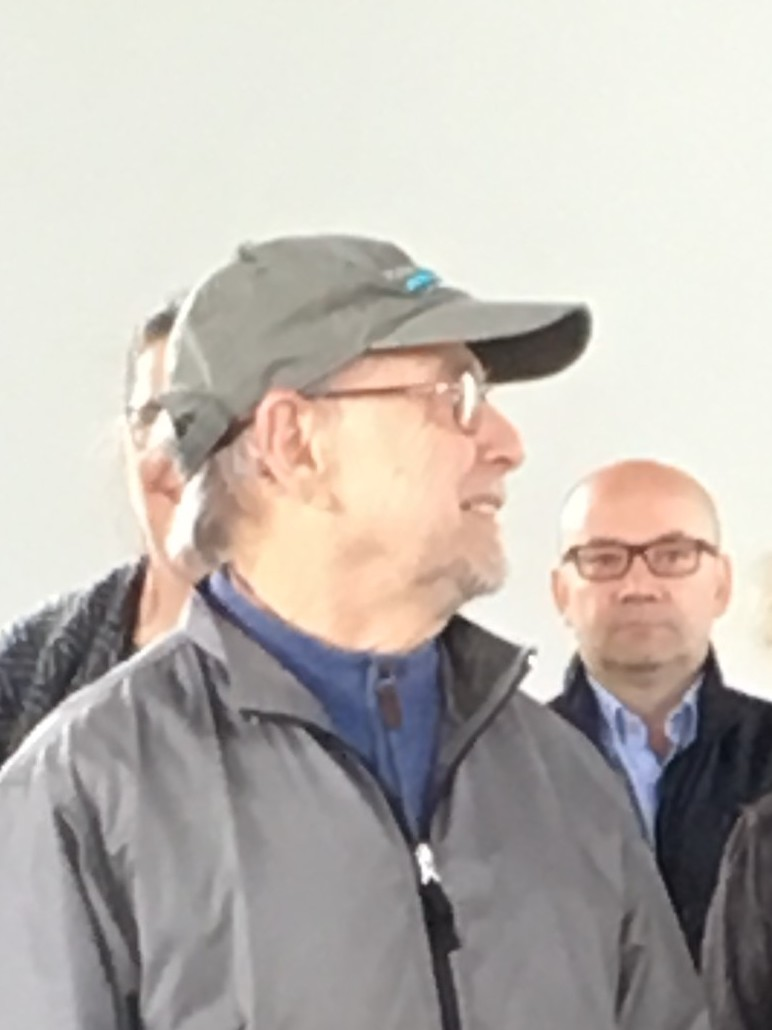
- Born: 28 February 1935 (age 91); Cairo, Egypt
- Education: Central School of Art and Design; Saint Martin's School of Art
- Elected: Royal Academy, 1992

William G. Tucker, Gymnast II, bronze, 1985, Museum of Fine Arts, Houston

William G. Tucker RA (born 28 February 1935) is a modernist British sculptor and modern art scholar.

== Biography ==
Tucker was born to English parents on 28 February 1935 in Cairo, Egypt. In 1937, his family returned to England, where Tucker was raised. At the University of Oxford he studied history from 1955 to 1958. He moved to London and studied sculpture both at the Central School of Art and Design and at Saint Martin's School of Art, where Anthony Caro was teaching.

In 1961, while at Saint Martin's, Tucker edited the second issue of the student magazine First. Tucker's issue included answers to a survey of British sculptors regarding the nature of their practices, as well as an editorial outlining themes that would reoccur throughout his writings on sculpture, especially his belief that 'sculpture is another poetry, not painting's poor relation'. It also cites The Human Condition by philosopher Hannah Arendt, which became a frequent point of reference for the artist.

In 1965 he was one of nine sculptors included in the important exhibition New Generation: 65 at the Whitechapel Gallery in London, and one of seven from that exhibition whose work was included in the Primary Structures: Younger American and British Sculptors exhibition at the Jewish Museum in New York in the following year.

Tucker spent two years as a Gregory Fellow at the Fine Arts Department of the University of Leeds (1968–70) and represented Britain at the 1972 Venice Biennale. In 1974 he published The Language of Sculpture (Thames & Hudson, London), which was released in the United States in 1978 as Early Modern Sculpture (Oxford University Press).

He moved to New York in 1978 and taught at Columbia University and at the New York Studio School of Drawing, Painting and Sculpture. He received a Guggenheim Fellowship for sculpture in 1981 and a National Endowment for the Arts fellowship in 1986. Tucker became an American citizen in 1985. He served as co-chairman of the Art Program at Bard College.

He was elected to the Royal Academy of Arts in 1992.

In 2010, Tucker was a recipient of the Lifetime Achievement in Contemporary Sculpture award of the International Sculpture Center.

In 2011, Tucker was elected an honorary National Academician, National Academy Museum, New York.

Recent one-person museum exhibitions included Tucker: Mass and Figure at the Museo de Bellas Artes de Bilbao in 2015, and William Tucker at the Kunstmuseum Winterthur in Switzerland in 2016.
