= Whitechapel Gallery =

Art gallery in London

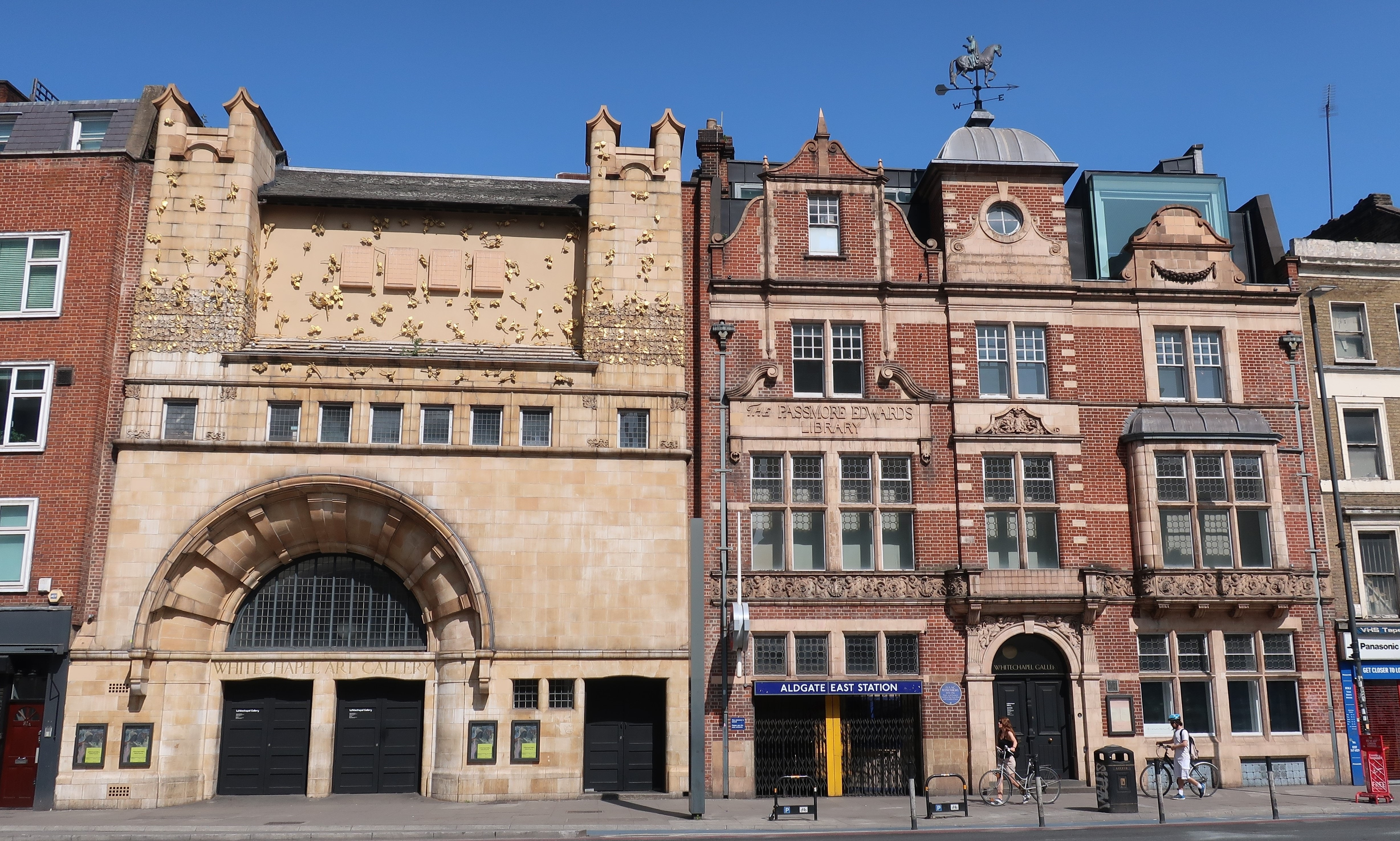
- The original Whitechapel Gallery to the left; and the former Passmore Edwards library building, now incorporated into the gallery, to the right

- Location within Central London
- Established: 1901; 125 years ago
- Location: 77–82 Whitechapel High Street, London, England, United Kingdom
- Coordinates: 51.515984°N 0.070485°W
- Visitors: 490,000 (April 2009 – April 2010)
- Director: Gilane Tawadros
- Public transit access: Aldgate East
- Website: www.whitechapelgallery.org

The Whitechapel Gallery is a public art gallery in Whitechapel on the north side of Whitechapel High Street, in the London Borough of Tower Hamlets. The original building, designed by Charles Harrison Townsend, opened in 1901 as one of the first publicly funded galleries for temporary exhibitions in London. The building is a notable example of the British Modern Style. In 2009 the gallery approximately doubled in size by incorporating the adjacent former Passmore Edwards library building. It exhibits the work of contemporary artists and organizes retrospective exhibitions and other art shows.

== History ==
The gallery exhibited Pablo Picasso's Guernica in 1938 as part of a touring exhibition organised by Roland Penrose to protest against the Spanish Civil War.

The gallery played a major role in the history of post-war British art by promoting the work of emerging artists. Several significant exhibitions were held at the Whitechapel Gallery including This is Tomorrow in 1956, the first UK exhibition by Mark Rothko in 1961, and in 1964, The New Generation show which featured John Hoyland, Bridget Riley, David Hockney and Patrick Caulfield among others.

Initiated by members of the Independent Group, the exhibition brought Pop Art to the general public as well as introducing some of the artists, concepts, designers and photographers that would define the Swinging Sixties.

Throughout its history, the gallery had a series of open exhibitions that provided a platform for the area's artist community, but by the early 1990s these open shows became less relevant as emerging artists moved to other areas.

In the late 1970s, the critical importance of the Whitechapel Gallery was displaced by newer venues such as the Hayward Gallery, then in the 1980s it enjoyed a resurgence under the Directorship of Nicholas Serota. The gallery had a major refurbishment in 1986; and in 2009 expanded into the former Passmore Edwards Library building next door. The expansion, which doubled the gallery's physical size and nearly tripled its available exhibition space, now allows the Whitechapel Gallery to remain open to the public all year round.

== Notable exhibitions ==
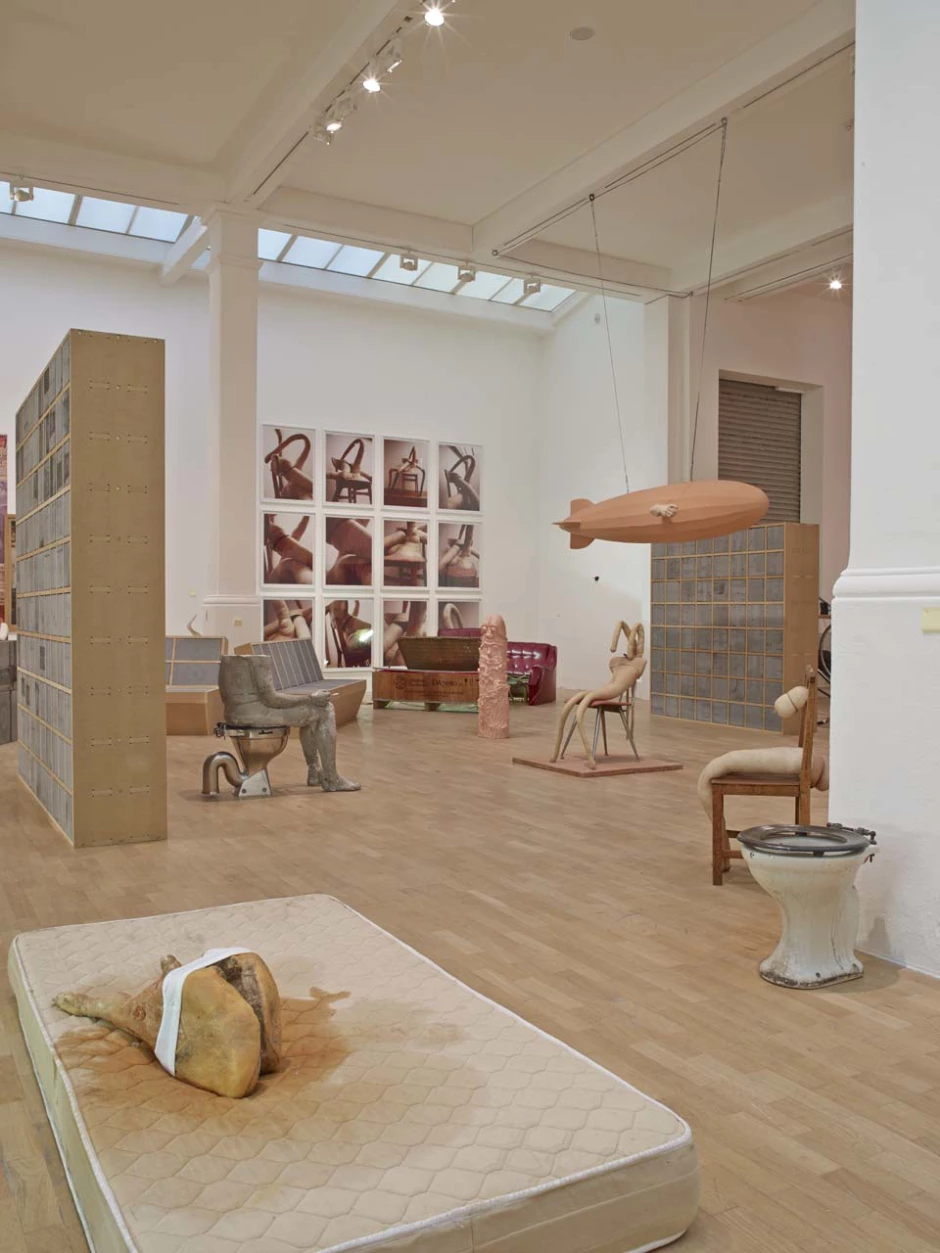
Sarah Lucas, SITUATION, Whitechapel Gallery, London, 2013.

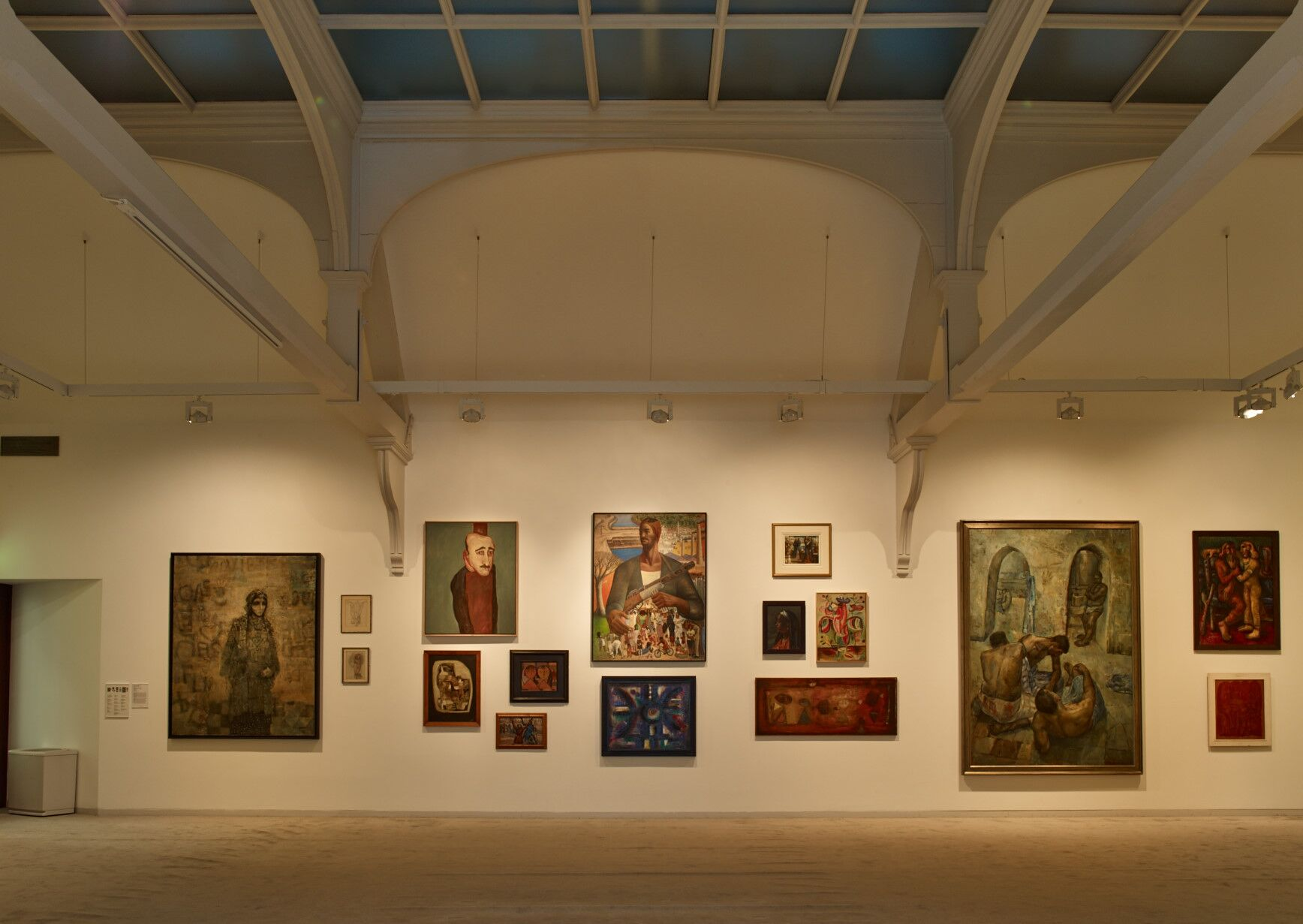
Barjeel's 'Imperfect Chronology' exhibition at the Whitechapel Gallery

- 1908 – Muhammadan Art and Life in Turkey, Persia, Egypt, Morocco and India. Autumn Exhibition 23 October to 6 December. The opening day to the public was on 27th Ramadan. An advisory member was Syed Ameer Ali, who in 1910 was one of the main instigators of the London Mosque Fund, which went on to establish the nearby East London Mosque.
- 1956 – This is Tomorrow exhibit
- 1958 – American abstract expressionist Jackson Pollock
- 1961 – Mark Rothko. The installation of his work at the Whitechapel becomes his template for all subsequent shows.
- 1961 – Recent Australian painting, Whitechapel Gallery, London (including John Olsen)
- 1964 – The New Generation – Painting – showcasing the work of John Hoyland, Patrick Caulfield, David Hockney, Paul Huxley, Alan Jones and Bridget Riley
- 1965 – The New Generation – Sculpture – showcasing the work of Philip King, David Annesley, Michael Bolus, Tim Scott, William Tucker, Isaac Witkin
- 1970 and 1971 – David Hockney retrospective, first major shows of Gilbert & George and Richard Long
- 1978 – "Art for Society" surveyed contemporary British art with a social or political purpose, showing work by Andrew Turner, John Walker, Kate Walker, Paul Waplington, Janine Wiedel, Stephen Willats, Alison Williams, Gus Wylie
- 1982 – Frida Kahlo
- 1986 – Victor Willing, a retrospective exhibition
- 1993 – The Whitechapel Gallery showcases Lucian Freud
- 2001 and 2002 – Liam Gillick and Nan Goldin stage their first major solo shows in the UK
- 2008 – Cornelia Parker's film Chomskian Abstract, featuring Noam Chomsky
- 2009 – Retrospective of Isa Genzken's work and solo shows for Sophie Calle and Elizabeth Peyton
- 2010 – Survey of Alice Neel's portraits in Britain
- 19–20 January 2011 the gallery hosted the inaugural Northern Future Forum gathering of prime ministers.
- 2011 – First UK survey of German artist Thomas Struth, one of the photographers of the late 20th century
- 2012 – A comprehensive survey of Turner Prize winning British artist Gillian Wearing
- 2013 – The first major solo exhibition in London for YBA artist Sarah Lucas
- 2014 – Five decade survey of North American Richard Tuttle, which was presented in conjunction with a major installation in Tate Modern's Turbine Hall and a solo show for Dada pioneer Hannah Höch
- 2015 – The first show in Britain on Arab Modernism "Imperfect Chronology: Arab Art from the Modern to the Contemporary", from the Barjeel Art Foundation collection
- 2016 – A new commission by feminist activism art group Guerrilla Girls and a major retrospective of British artist Eduardo Paolozzi
- 2017 – A major retrospective of German artist Thomas Ruff and solo show for British artist Benedict Drew
- 2018 – A solo show for Mark Dion and the first major UK survey of artist duo Elmgreen & Dragset

== Publications ==
In 2006, Whitechapel Gallery and MIT Press formed an editorial alliance to produce a new series of books entitled Documents of Contemporary Art.

== Expansion ==
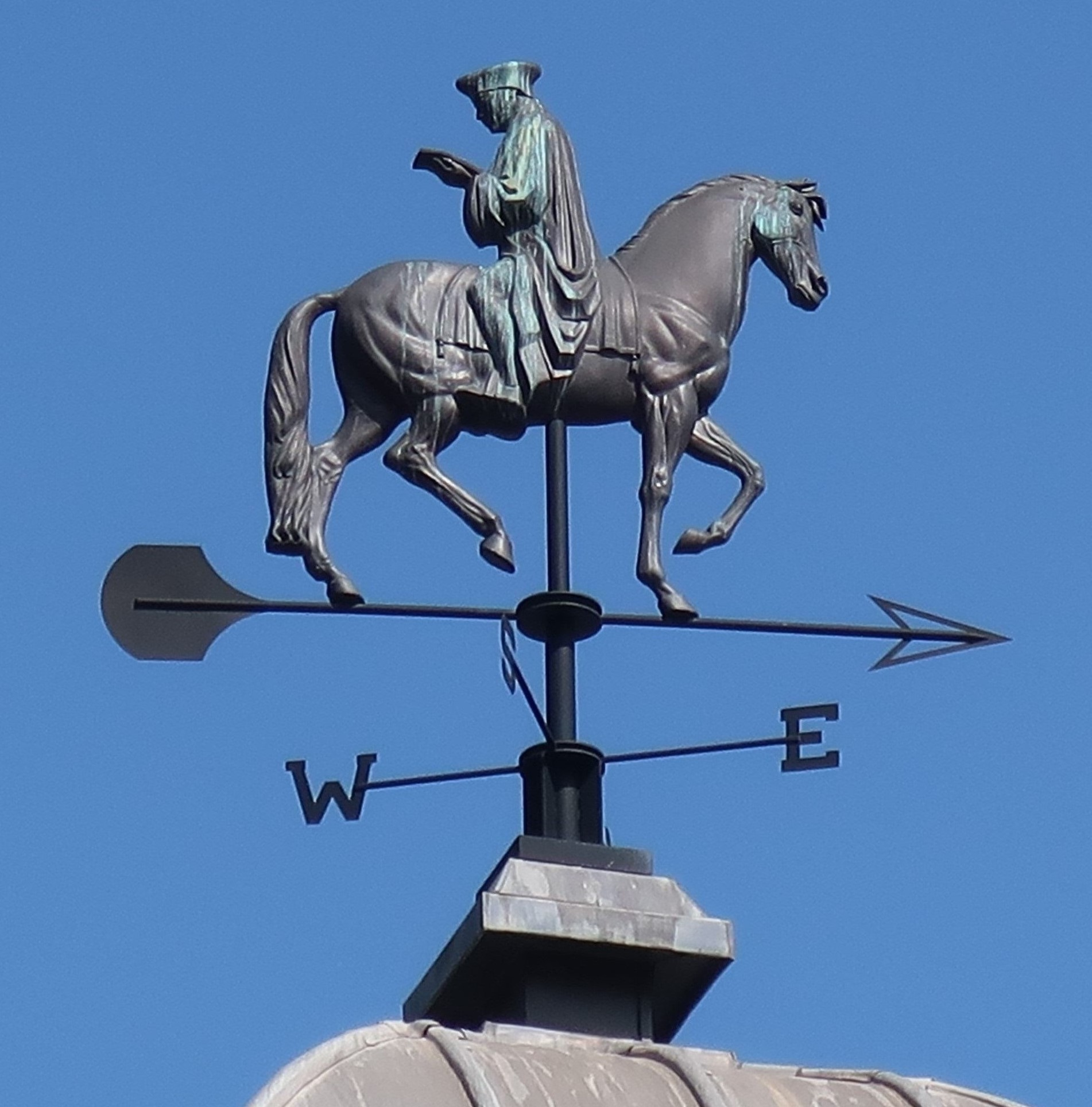
Rodney Graham's weather vane (2008), commissioned for the expansion and placed on the former library building. It depicts the artist in the guise of 16th-century humanist scholar Desiderius Erasmus.

The Whitechapel reopened in April 2009 after a two-year project, which approximately doubled the size of the Gallery by incorporating the adjacent former Passmore Edwards library building (vacated when Whitechapel Idea Store opened). The work cost approximately £13.5 million and was partly funded by the Heritage Lottery Fund. A full-size tapestry based on Pablo Picasso's Guernica, by Jacqueline de la Baume Dürrbach and loaned from the United Nations Art Collection, was included in the inaugural exhibition by Goshka Macuga and Isa Genzken.

As part of the expansion, a new Archive Gallery, a reading room and an archive repository (where the Whitechapel's historic records are held) have been created to support the Whitechapel's standing as an educational charity. The archives catalogue the very conception of the gallery, as well as the complete directors' files of correspondence which reveal the reasons behind key decisions in the Gallery's history.

== Directors ==
- Charles Aitken (1901–1911)
- Hugh Scrutton (1945–1952)
- Bryan Robertson (1952–1968)
- Mark Glazebrook (1969–1971)
- Jenny Stein (1972–1974)
- Jasia Reichardt (1974–1976)
- Nicholas Serota (1976–1988)
- Catherine Lampert (1988–2002)
- Iwona Blazwick (2002–2022)
- Gilane Tawadros (2022–Present)
