= Phillip King (sculptor) =

British sculptor (1934–2021)

Phillip King PRA
- Born: 1 May 1934
- Died: 27 July 2021 (aged 87)
- Known for: Sculpture
- Movement: New Generation

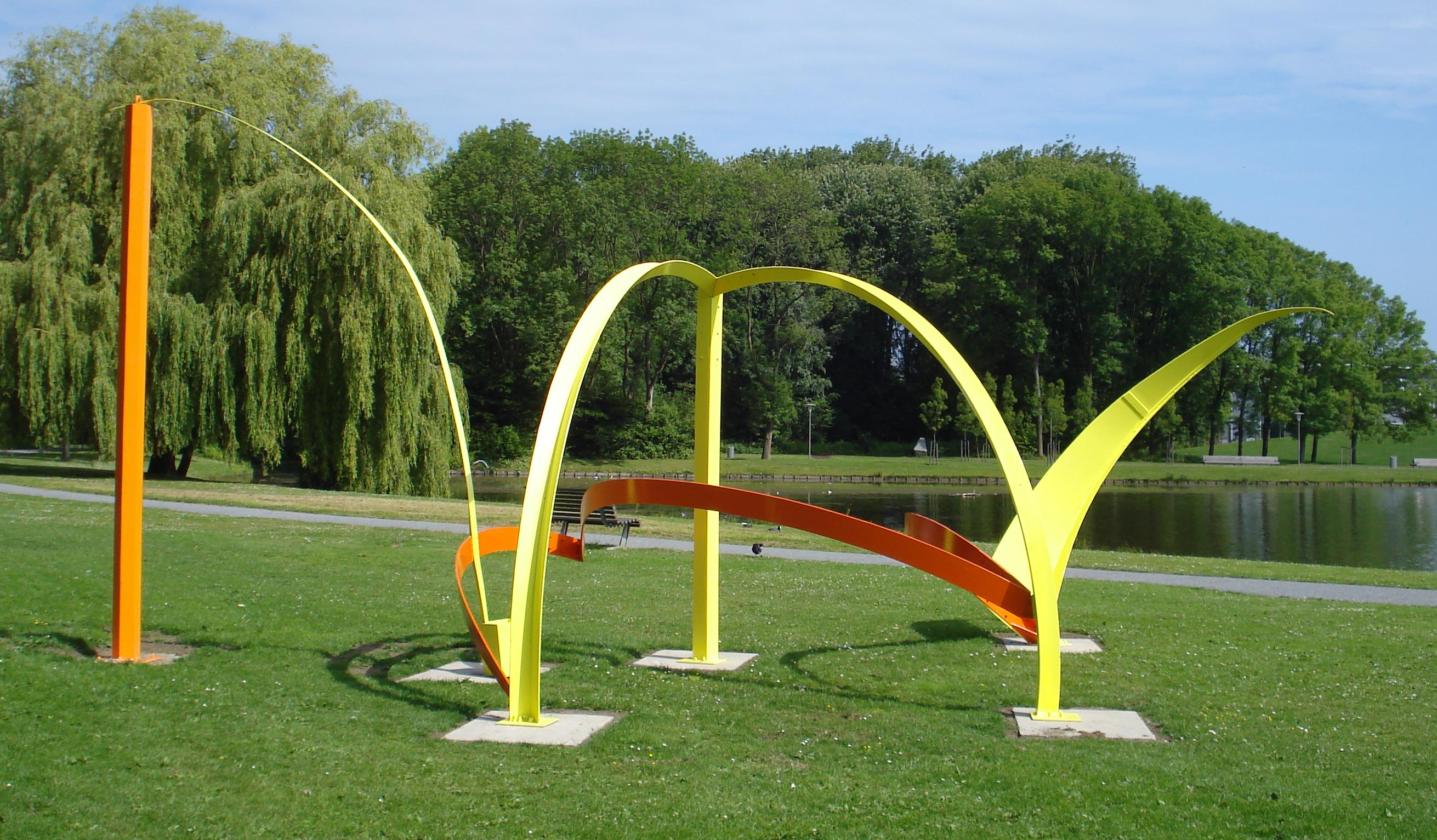
Quill (1971), Rotterdam

Phillip King PRA (1 May 1934 – 27 July 2021) was a British sculptor. He was one of Anthony Caro's best-known students, even though the two artists were near contemporaries. Their education followed similar trajectories and they both worked as assistants to Henry Moore. Following the "New Generation" show at the Whitechapel Gallery, both Caro and King were included in the seminal 1966 exhibit, "Primary Structures" at the Jewish Museum in New York representing the British influence on the "New Art". In 2011, his work was represented in the Royal Academy exhibition on Modern British Sculpture which explored British sculpture of the twentieth century.

== Biography ==
King was born in Tunis, French Tunisia. After the war, his parents moved to England, and he was educated at Mill Hill School from 1947 to 1952. While doing his national service he spent much time in Paris where he met many artists. He was supposed to be joining a general's staff, but when he got there found that someone else had taken his post. As a result, he found himself with a lot of time to explore the city and paid many visits to the Louvre, where he made drawings of the sculptures. He said, "It made me think for the first time about sculpture being the art of the invisible: it was quite a discovery".

He studied modern languages at Christ's College, Cambridge, from 1954 to 1957. While he was here, he devoted his time to self-taught sculpture and displayed his work at the Heffer Gallery. He sent an invitation to Anthony Caro, an older sculptor whom he admired. Much to his delight, Caro attended the exhibition, and the next year King took classes in Sculpture with him at Saint Martin's School of Art from 1957 to 1958. The next year he spent working as an assistant to Henry Moore and teaching at Saint Martin's.

In 1990, King was made Professor Emeritus of the Royal College and was the President of the Royal Academy of Art from 1999 to 2004, presumably declining the usual knighthood. In 1992 William Feaver wrote in London's Observer that King is "the one sculptor of his generation prepared to jettison what he has proved himself good at in order to explore what cannot be programmed." He took over at a time when the academy was facing financial trouble and he has said it distracted him from his work.

King proved Feaver correct by turning unexpectedly to Japan and ceramics in 1993 and two years later making the powerful unglazed, vessel-themed works which were the focus of an exhibition in 2004. Richard Cork wrote about the sculptures:

Often pierced from one side to the other and interrupted by renegade protuberances, they end up conveying more emotional conflict than initially seems possible. But they possess optimism as well... That is why he is such a rewarding artist, and why each distinct phase in his ceaselessly resourceful career adds to the richness of his achievement.

The exhibition was presented in Yorkshire, London, and New York.

One sculpture titled Zen Garden, created by King and students from the Royal College of Art, remains available to see within Tout Quarry, Isle of Portland, Dorset, England.

In 2010, Phillip King was a recipient of the International Sculpture Center's Lifetime Achievement in Contemporary Sculpture Award. He lived and worked in London until his death in July 2021 at the age of 87.

== Bibliography ==
Exhibition Catalogues

- Phillip King: A Survey through 50 Years. [Catalogue of the exhibition held at Flowers East 21 January - 19 February 2011] London.

Monographs

- Hilton, T. (1992) The sculpture of Phillip King. Lund Humphries Publishers Ltd

Cultural offices
Preceded by Sir Philip Dowson	President of the Royal Academy; 1999–2004	Succeeded by Sir Nicholas Grimshaw
