= Minimalism (visual arts) =

Visual arts movement

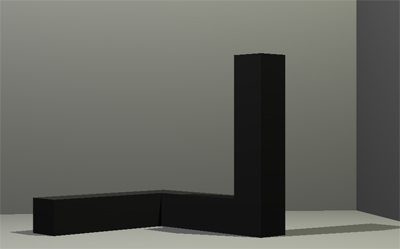
Tony Smith, Free Ride, 1962, 6'8 × 6'8 × 6'8, Museum of Modern Art (New York City)

Minimalism describes movements in various forms of art and design, especially visual art and music, where the work is set out to expose the essence, essentials or identity of a subject through eliminating all non-essential forms, features or concepts. As a specific movement in the arts it is identified with developments in post–World War II Western Art, most strongly with American visual arts in the 1960s and early 1970s. Minimalism is often interpreted as a reaction to abstract expressionism and a bridge to postminimal art practices. Prominent artists associated with this movement include Sol LeWitt, Ad Reinhardt, Nassos Daphnis, Tony Smith, Donald Judd, John McCracken, Agnes Martin, Dan Flavin, Robert Morris, Larry Bell, Anne Truitt, Yves Klein and Frank Stella. Artists themselves have sometimes reacted against the label due to the negative implication of the work being simplistic.

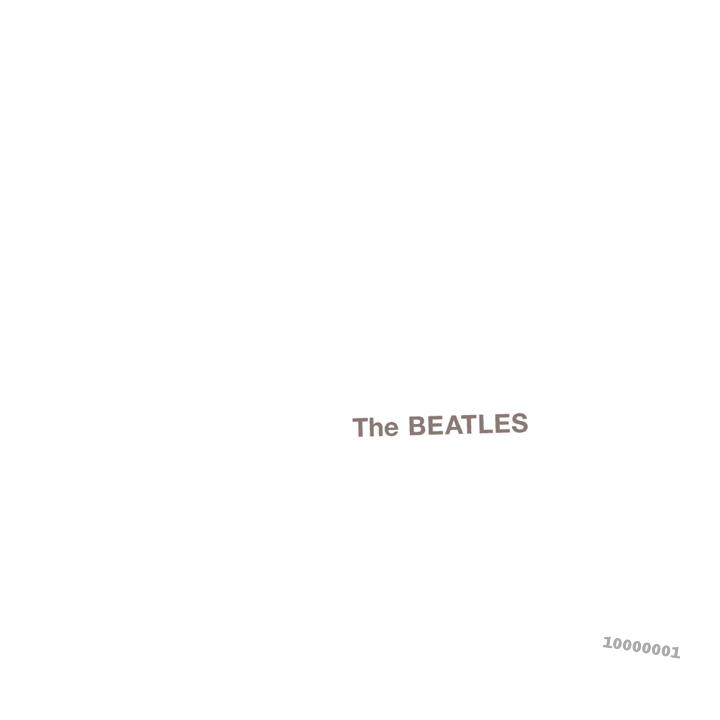
Record cover of the Beatles's White Album designed by British conceptual artist Richard Hamilton

== History ==
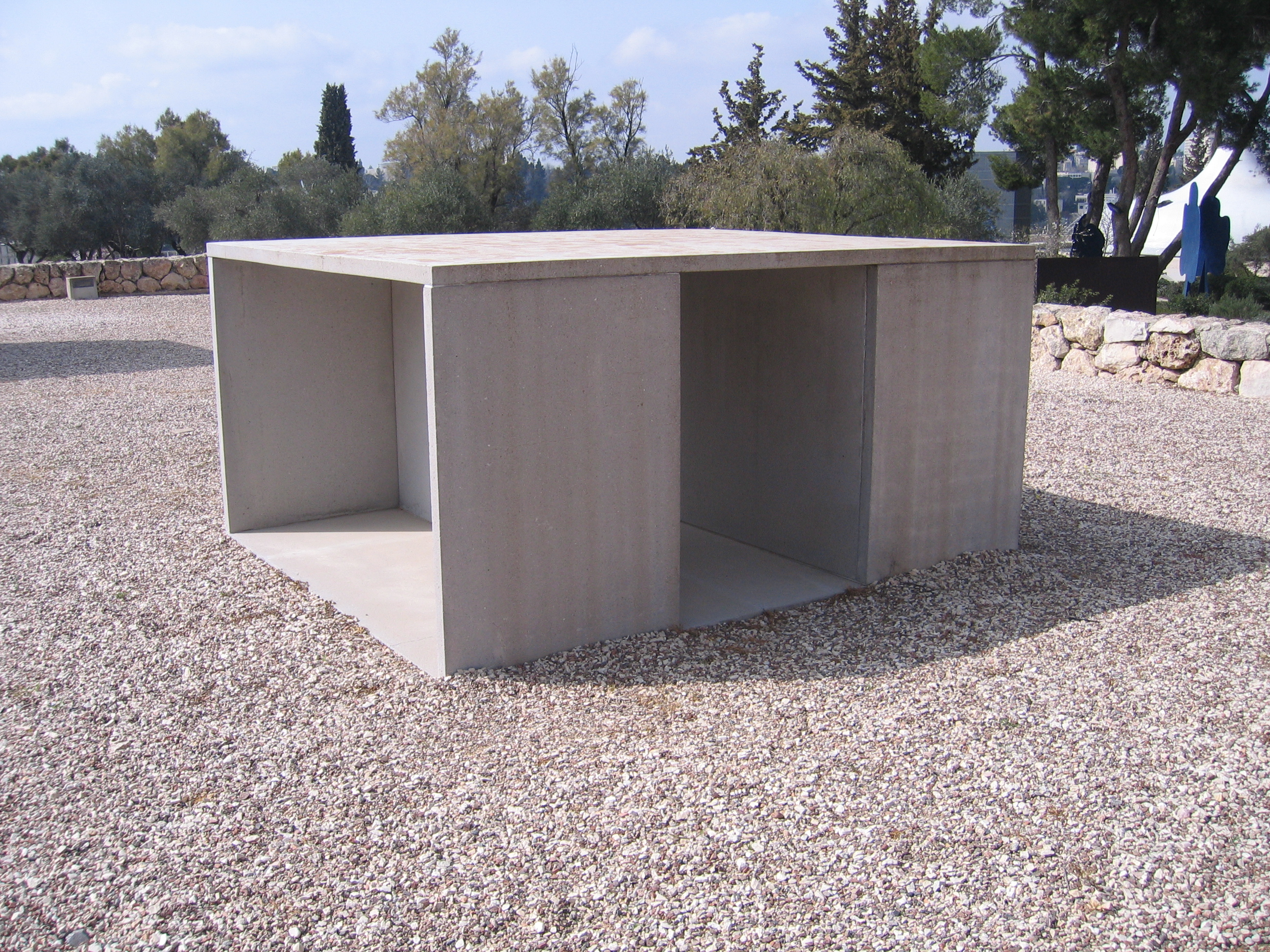
Donald Judd, Untitled, 1991, Israel Museum Art Garden, Jerusalem

Minimalism in visual art, generally referred to as "minimal art", literalist art, and ABC Art emerged in New York in the early 1960s. Initially minimal art appeared in New York in the 60s as new and older artists moved toward geometric abstraction; exploring via painting in the cases of Frank Stella, Kenneth Noland, Al Held, Ellsworth Kelly, Robert Ryman and others; and sculpture in the works of various artists including Sol LeWitt, Donald Judd, Carl Andre, Dan Flavin, David Smith, Anthony Caro, Tony Smith, Ad Reinhardt, and others.

Judd's sculpture was showcased in 1964 at the Green Gallery in Manhattan as were Flavin's first fluorescent light works, while other leading Manhattan galleries like the Leo Castelli Gallery and the Pace Gallery also began to showcase artists focused on geometric abstraction. In addition there were two seminal and influential museum exhibitions: Primary Structures: Younger American and British Sculpture shown from April 27 to June 12, 1966 at the Jewish Museum in New York, organized by the museum's Curator of Painting and Sculpture, Kynaston McShine and Systemic Painting, at the Solomon R. Guggenheim Museum curated by Lawrence Alloway also in 1966 that showcased geometric abstraction in the American art world via shaped canvas, color field, and hard-edge painting. In the wake of those exhibitions and a few others the art movement called minimal art emerged.

The European roots of minimalism are found in the geometric abstractions of painters associated with the Bauhaus, in the works of Kazimir Malevich, Piet Mondrian and other artists associated with the De Stijl movement, and the Russian Constructivist movement, and in the work of the Romanian sculptor Constantin Brâncuși. Minimal art is also inspired in part by the paintings of Barnett Newman, Ad Reinhardt, Josef Albers, and the works of artists as diverse as Pablo Picasso, Marcel Duchamp, Giorgio Morandi, and others. Minimalism was also a reaction against the painterly subjectivity of abstract expressionism that had been dominant in the New York School during the 1940s and 1950s.

== Paintings ==
Frank Stella, Die Fahne Hoch!, 1959, Whitney Museum of American Art

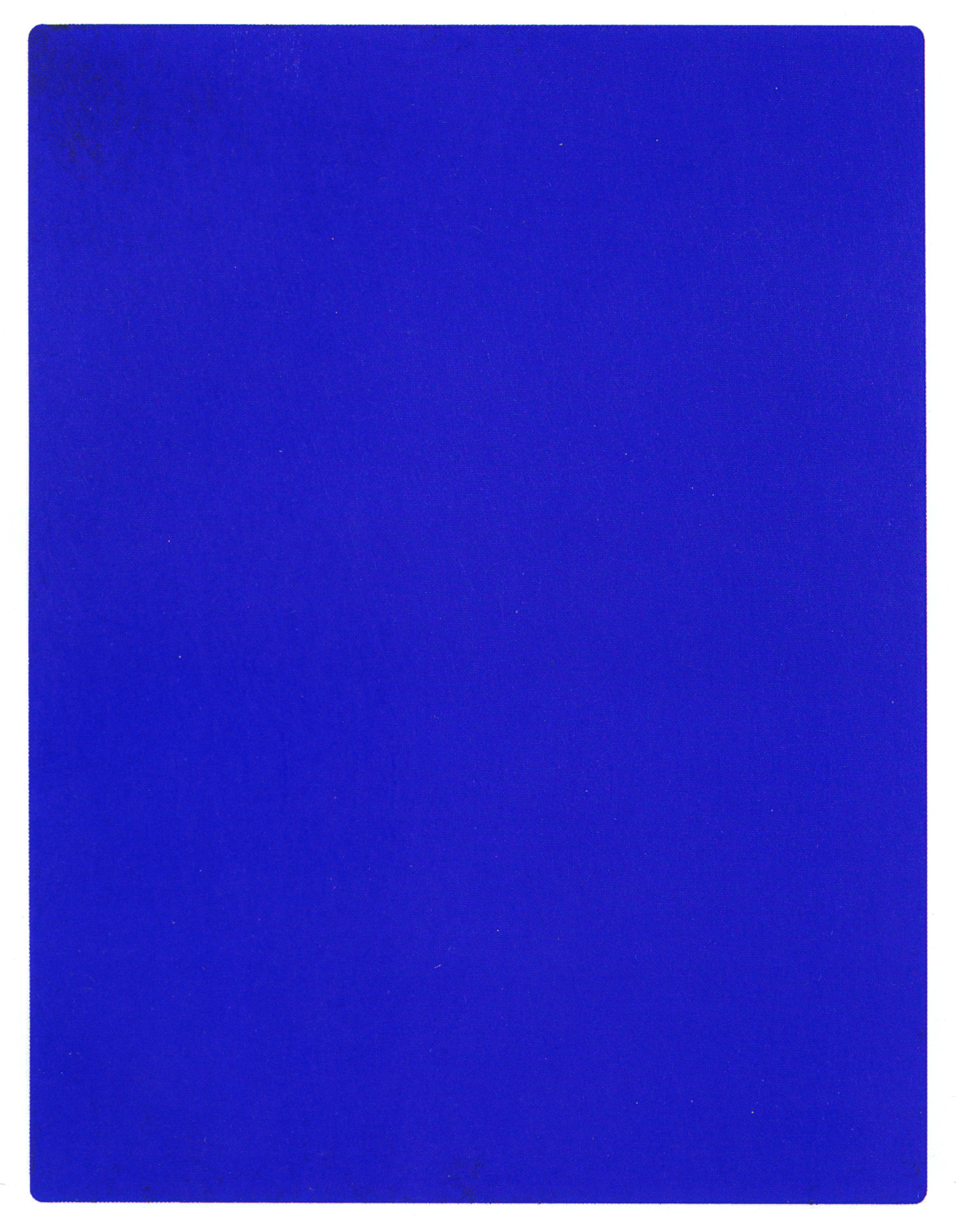
Yves Klein, IKB 191, 1962, 65.5x49cm, dry pigment and synthetic resin on canvas

In contrast to the previous decade's more subjective abstract expressionists, some minimalists explicitly stated that their art was not about self-expression, theirs was 'objective'. In general, minimalism's features included geometric, often cubic forms purged of much metaphor, equality of parts, repetition, neutral surfaces, and industrial materials.

One of the first artists specifically associated with minimalism was the painter Frank Stella, whose early "pinstripe" paintings (the earliest group of which are also referred to as the Black Paintings) were included in the 1959 show, 16 Americans, organized by Dorothy Miller at the Museum of Modern Art in New York. The width of the stripes in Stellas's pinstripe paintings were determined by the dimensions of the lumber used for stretchers, visible as the depth of the painting when viewed from the side, used to construct the supportive chassis upon which the canvas was stretched. The decisions about structures on the front surface of the canvas were therefore not entirely subjective, but preconditioned by a "given" feature of the physical construction of the support. In the show catalog, Carl Andre noted, "Art excludes the unnecessary. Frank Stella has found it necessary to paint stripes. There is nothing else in his painting." These reductive works were in sharp contrast to the energy-filled and apparently highly subjective and emotionally charged paintings of Willem de Kooning or Franz Kline and, in terms of precedent among the previous generation of abstract expressionists, leaned more toward the less gestural, often somber, color field paintings of Barnett Newman and Mark Rothko. Although Stella received immediate attention from the MoMA show, artists including Kenneth Noland and Gene Davis, had also begun to explore stripes, monochromatic, and hard-edge formats from the late 50s through the 1960s.

=== Monochrome revival ===
Monochrome painting had been initiated at the first Incoherent arts' exhibition in 1882 in Paris, with a black painting by poet Paul Bilhaud entitled Combat de Nègres dans un tunnel (Negroes fight in a tunnel). In the subsequent exhibitions of the Incoherent arts (also in the 1880s) the writer Alphonse Allais proposed seven other monochrome paintings, such as Première communion de jeunes filles chlorotiques par un temps de neige (First communion of anaemic young girls in the snow, white), or Récolte de la tomate par des cardinaux apoplectiques au bord de la Mer Rouge (Tomato harvesting by apoplectic cardinals on the shore of the Red Sea, red). However, this kind of activity bears more similarity to 20th century Dada, or Neo-Dada, and particularly the works of the Fluxus group of the 1960s, than to 20th century monochrome painting since Malevich.

Yves Klein had painted monochromes as early as 1949, and held the first private exhibition of this work in 1950, his first public showing was the publication of the artist's book Yves: Peintures in November 1954.

Ad Reinhardt, whose reductive nearly all-black paintings seemed to anticipate minimalism, wrote of the value of a reductive approach to art: "The more stuff in it, the busier the work of art, the worse it is. More is less. Less is more. The eye is a menace to clear sight. The laying bare of oneself is obscene. Art begins with the getting rid of nature."

Reinhardt's remark directly contradicts Hans Hofmann's regard for nature as the source of his own abstract expressionist paintings. A famous exchange in 1942 between Hofmann and Jackson Pollock was recorded by Lee Krasner in an interview with Dorothy Strickler (on 1964-11-02) for the Smithsonian Institution Archives of American Art. In Krasner's words:

When I brought Hofmann up to meet Pollock and see his work which was before we moved here, Hofmann's reaction was—one of the questions he asked Jackson was, "Do you work from nature?" There were no still lifes around or models around and Jackson's answer was, "I am nature." And Hofmann's reply was, "Ah, but if you work by heart, you will repeat yourself." To which Jackson did not reply at all.

== Specific objects ==
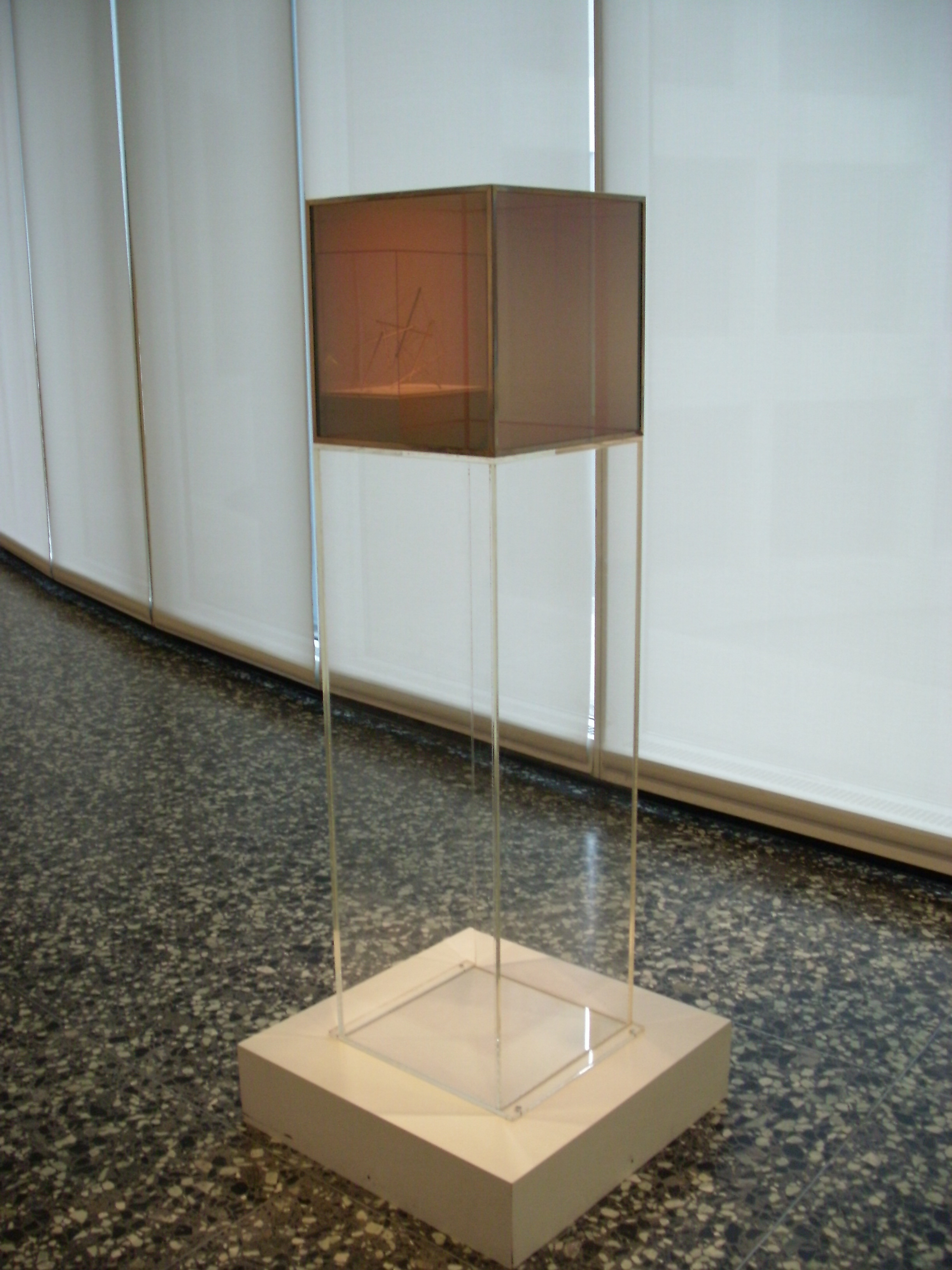
Larry Bell, Untitled (1964), bismuth, chromium, gold, and rhodium on gold-plated brass; Hirshhorn Museum and Sculpture Garden

The tendency in minimal art to exclude the pictorial, illusionistic, and fictive in favor of the literal led to a movement away from painterly and toward sculptural concerns. Donald Judd had started as a painter, and ended as a creator of objects. His seminal essay, "Specific Objects" (published in Arts Yearbook 8, 1965), was a touchstone of theory for the formation of minimalist aesthetics. In this essay, Judd found a starting point for a new territory for American art, and a simultaneous rejection of residual inherited European artistic values. He pointed to evidence of this development in the works of an array of artists active in New York at the time, including Jasper Johns, Dan Flavin and Lee Bontecou. Of "preliminary" importance for Judd was the work of George Earl Ortman, who had concretized and distilled painting's forms into blunt, tough, philosophically charged geometries. These specific objects inhabited a space not comfortably classifiable as either painting or sculpture. That the categorical identity of such objects was itself in question, and that they avoid easy association with well-worn and over-familiar conventions, was a part of their value for Judd.

== Criticism ==
This movement was heavily criticized by modernist formalist art critics and historians. Some critics thought minimal art represented a misunderstanding of the modern dialectic of painting and sculpture as defined by critic Clement Greenberg, arguably the dominant American critic of painting in the period leading up to the 1960s. Another critique of minimal art concerns that many artists were designers of the work while they were executed by unknown craftsmen.

The most notable critique of minimalism was produced by Michael Fried, a formalist critic, who objected to the work on the basis of its "theatricality". In "Art and Objecthood", published in Artforum in June 1967, he declared that the minimal work of art, particularly minimal sculpture, was based on an engagement with the physicality of the spectator. He argued that work like Robert Morris's transformed the act of viewing into a type of spectacle, in which the artifice of the act of observation and the viewer's participation in the work were unveiled. Fried saw this displacement of the viewer's experience from an aesthetic engagement within, to an event outside of the artwork as a failure of minimal art. Fried's essay was immediately challenged by postminimalist and earth artist Robert Smithson in a letter to the editor in the October issue of Artforum. Smithson stated: "what Fried fears most is the consciousness of what he is doing – namely being himself theatrical".

== See also ==
- List of minimalist artists
- Maximalism
- Minimalism
