= List of minimalist artists =

Minimalism was an art movement that began during the 1960s. This list of minimalist artists are primarily artists whose works were done in the 1960s, and are considered minimal, although some artists subsequently radically changed their work in the 1970s and in subsequent decades. This list is incomplete.

== Artists to whom the term minimalist was originally applied ==
- Carl Andre (1935-2024), American sculptor
- Jo Baer (born 1929), American artist, associated with minimalist art
- Larry Bell (born 1939), American sculptor
- Ronald Bladen (1918–1988), American sculptor
- Dan Flavin (1933–1996), American installation artist, fluorescent light sculpture
- Donald Judd (1928–1994), American sculptor
- Sol LeWitt (1928–2007), American installation artist
- Robert Mangold (born 1937), American painter
- Agnes Martin (1912–2004), Canadian/American painter
- John McCracken (1934–2011), American sculptor
- Robert Morris (1931-2018), American sculptor
- Robert Ryman (1930-2019), American painter
- Fred Sandback (1943–2003), American installation artist
- Tony Smith (1912–1980), pioneer of minimalist sculpture
- Frank Stella (1936 - 2024), American painter/sculptor

== Other artists whose work might be regarded as related to minimalist art ==
- James Lee Byars (1932–1997), American sculptor/performance artist
- Anthony Caro (1924–2013), British sculptor
- Walter De Maria (1935-2013), American sculptor
- Ellsworth Kelly (1923–2015), American painter/sculptor
- Bob Law (1934–2004), British painter/sculptor
- Sam Richardson (1934–2013), American sculptor/printmaker
- Richard Serra (1938–2024), American sculptor
- Frederick Spratt (1927–2008), American painter/sculptor
- Anne Truitt (1921–2004), American sculptor

== Other artists whose work might be regarded as proto-minimalist ==
- Geraldo de Barros (1923-1998), painter and photographer, was known for his trailblazing work in experimental abstract photography and modernism
- Piet Mondrian (1872–1944), Dutch painter
- Kasimir Malevich (1878–1935), Russian painter, pioneer of abstract art
- Josef Albers (1888–1976), German-American painter
- Giorgio Morandi (1890–1964), Italian Still-life painter, proto-Minimalist
- Barnett Newman (1905–1970), American painter, abstract expressionist
- David Smith (1906–1965), pioneer of geometric and minimalist sculpture
- Ad Reinhardt (1913–1967), American painter, abstract expressionist

== Musical artists whose work might be regarded as minimalist ==
- John Adams (born 1947)
- Roberto Carnevale (born 1966)
- John Cage (1912–1992)
- Lawrence Chandler (born 1961)
- Kyle Bobby Dunn (born 1986)
- Morton Feldman (1926–1987)
- Jon Gibson (1940–2020)
- Philip Glass (born 1937)
- Tom Johnson (born 1939)
- Alvin Lucier (1931-2021)
- Charlemagne Palestine (born 1947)
- Steve Reich (born 1936)
- Terry Riley (born 1935)
- Erik Satie (1866–1925)
- Howard Skempton (born 1947)
- Simeon ten Holt (1923–2012)
- Yann Tiersen (born 1970)
- La Monte Young (born 1935)

== See also ==
- Neo-minimalism
- Minimalism (visual arts)
