= Die Fahne Hoch =

Die Fahne Hoch may refer to:

- "Horst-Wessel-Lied", also known as Die Fahne Hoch
- Die Fahne Hoch! (Frank Stella), a painting by an American artist
