= Bob Law =

British artist (1934–2004)

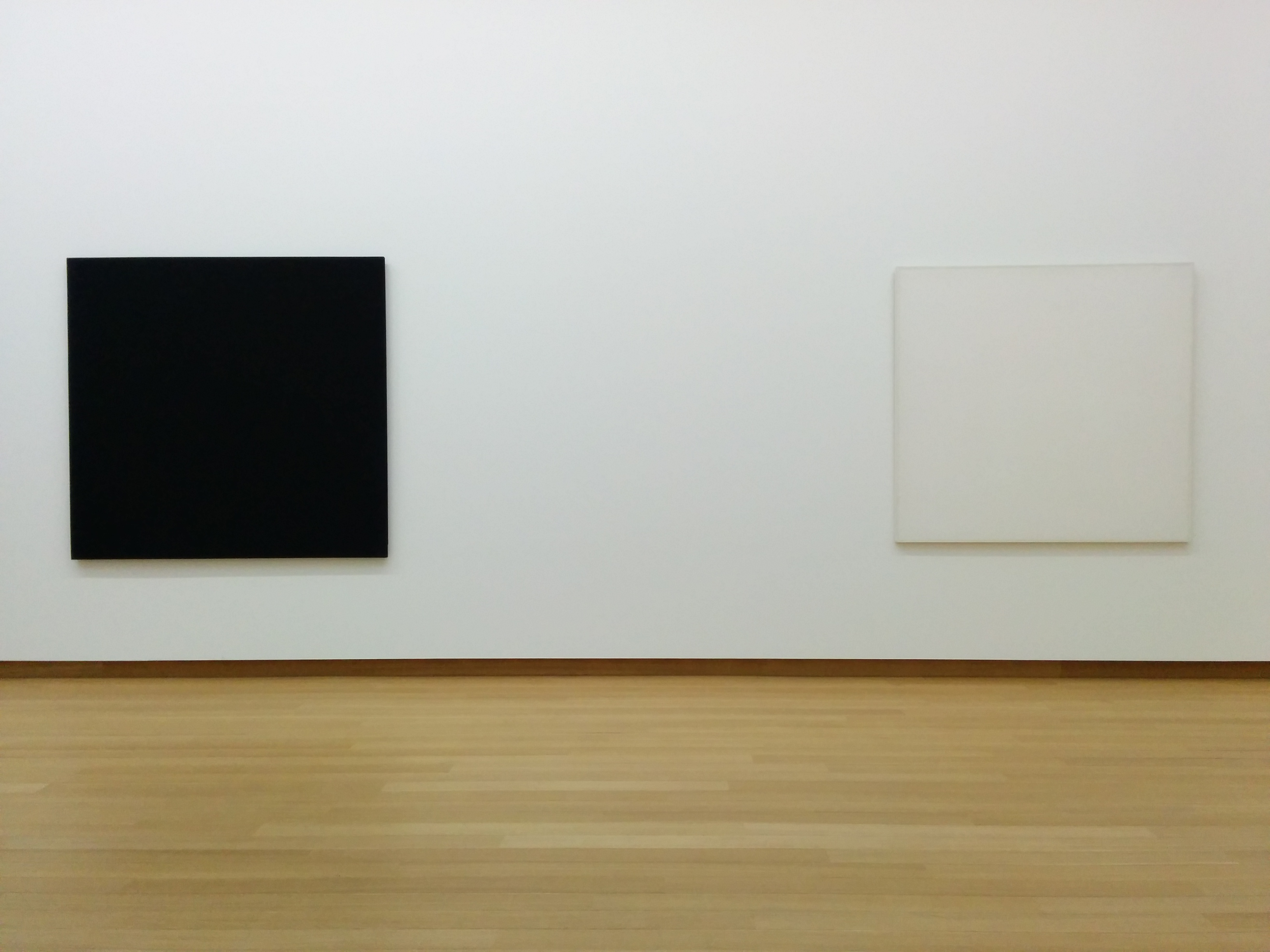
- Part of Number 88, Black/Black/Blue/Violet, 1974. Stedelijk Museum Amsterdam.
- Born: 22 January 1934; Middlesex, England
- Died: 17 April 2004 (aged 70)
- Known for: Painting
- Movement: Abstract expressionism, color field painting, sculpture

Bob Law (22 January 1934 – 17 April 2004) was a British painter and sculptor. A prolific artist throughout his lifetime, Law struggled with ideas surrounding the legitimacy and significance of abstract art.

== Life and work ==
Law was born in Middlesex, England on 22 January 1934, and moved to St Ives in 1957 where he painted and made pots. He had been particularly influenced by meetings with Peter Lanyon and Ben Nicholson in the late 1950s. In 1960, Bob Law moved away from Cornwall.

Bob Law's artistic career started in the late 1950s when he moved to St.Ives. Inspired by the landscape, these seemingly simple outlines around the perimeter of the paper lead to a minimalist exploration of lines, shapes and forms. He was influenced in this direction by his discovery of the abstract paintings of Barnett Newman and Mark Rothko that he saw in 1959 at the Tate Gallery. Law then went on to make a series of black paintings out of different combinations of dark colours that were exhibited at the Museum of Modern Art Oxford in 1974.

He took up sculpture in the 1970s, which extended and expanded his oeuvre.

He returned to live in the west of Cornwall in 1997 and died in April 2004.

== Retrospective ==
2009 saw the publication of Bob Law: A Retrospective by Ridinghouse, a comprehensive monograph that introduces the artist, his history and his work. This publication brings together the largest group of paintings, drawings and sculpture by Bob Law to date. In addition to 300 images, 6 texts present different moments and themes in Law's work. Anna Lovatt explores the role of drawing throughout; Jo Melvin introduces pivotal exhibitions during the 1960s and 70s; Anthony Bond provides an overview of the work and its relationship to art history and David Batchelor revisits his 1999 essay which describes visual and conceptual themes throughout Law's work. Richard Cork's 1974 interview with Bob Law as well as Giuseppe Panza's recollection of the artists are both reproduced in this volume.

== See also ==
- List of minimalist artists
- Abstract Imagists
- Formalism (art)
- Geometric abstraction
- Lyrical Abstraction
- Monochrome painting
- List of St. Ives artists
