= Black Paintings (Stella) =

Painting series by Frank Stella

The Black Paintings are a series of 24 minimalism related works executed by the painter and sculptor Frank Stella (1936–2024) in the late 1950s and 1960 in what is seen as being a response to abstract expressionism. The series was executed between 1958 and 1960. Some consider the works to be examples of minimalism and others one of the precursors of that movement in the visual arts.

Stella used commercial enamel paint and a house-painter's brush, he painted black stripes of the same width and evenly spaced on bare canvas, leaving the thin strips of canvas between them unpainted and exposed, along with his pencil-and-ruler drawn guideline.

These works are considered to have been Stella's breakthrough works. Four paintings from the series were included in the seminal exhibition at MoMA curated by Dorothy Miller, Sixteen Americans.

Die Fahne Hoch! (1959) now in the permanent collection of the Whitney Museum of American Art is perhaps the most famous work in this series. The title of this work which means Raise the Flag!, in German, is taken from the anthem of the Nazi Party, the "Horst-Wessel-Lied", and is one of three paintings in the series which makes direct reference to Nazism. Stella maintained that there was zilch in the work beyond what is observable and notoriously remarked What you see is what you see.

Some of the early works from this series were shown in the 2006 exhibition "1958" which originated at the Arthur M. Sackler Museum at Harvard University in Cambridge, Massachusetts and focused on this seminal period of Stella's career. The exhibition then traveled to the Wexner Center at Ohio State University in Columbus, Ohio and the Menil Collection in Houston, Texas.

Stella acknowledged during his lifetime that his early work, including these paintings was influenced by the work of the Irish writer Samuel Beckett.
