= Frank Stella =

American artist (1936–2024)

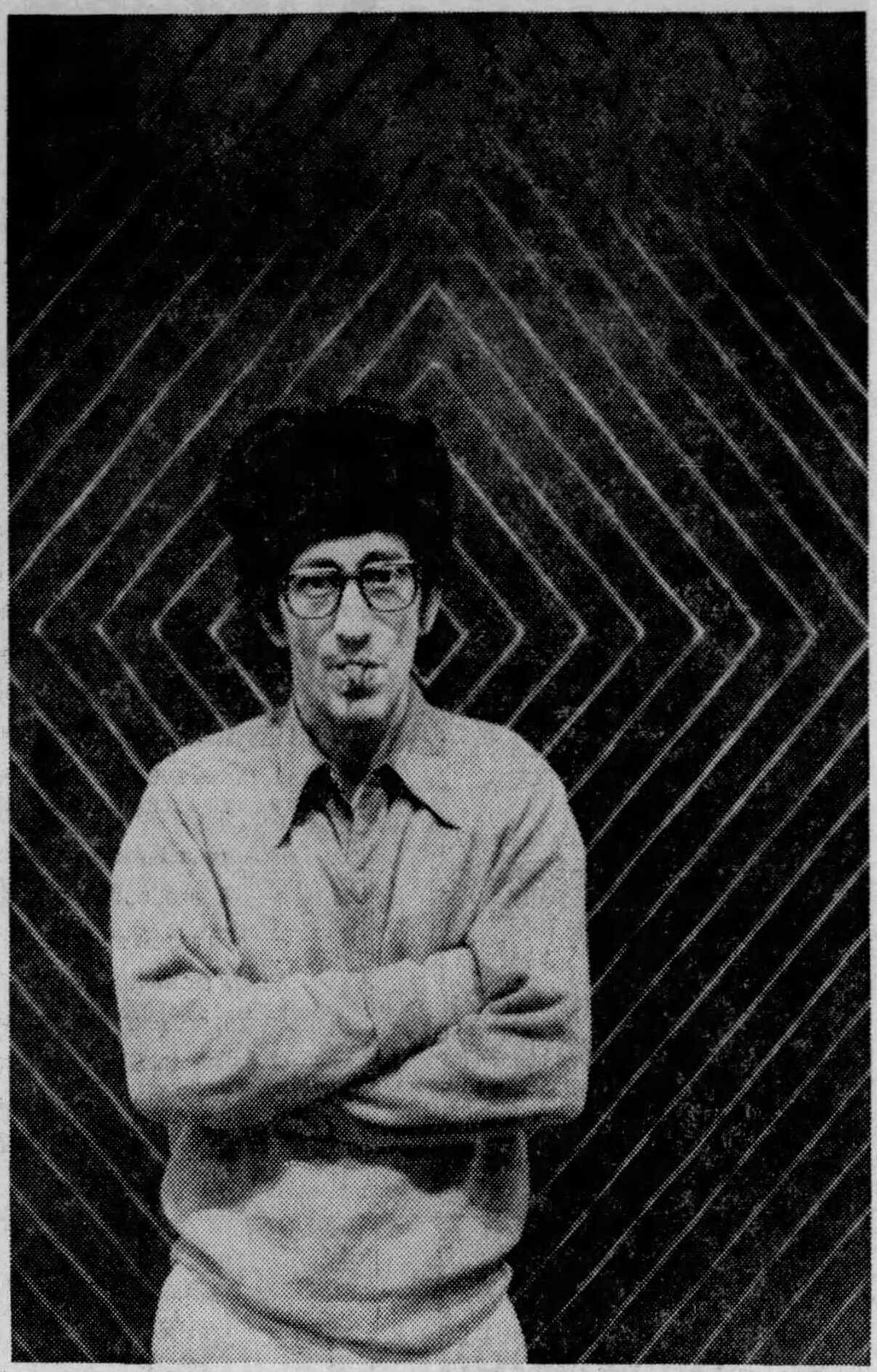
- Stella in 1976, posing in front of one of his paintings
- Born: Frank Philip Stella; May 12, 1936; Malden, Massachusetts, U.S.
- Died: May 4, 2024 (aged 87); New York City, U.S.
- Known for: Painter; printmaker; sculpture; architect
- Movement: Modernism; minimal art; abstract expressionism; geometric abstraction; abstract illusionism; lyrical abstraction; hard-edge painting; shaped canvas painting; color field painting
- Awards: Charles Eliot Norton Lectures – Harvard University 1984 Working Space; National Medal of Arts 2009; Lifetime Achievement Award in Contemporary Sculpture – International Sculpture Center 2011

Frank Philip Stella (May 12, 1936 – May 4, 2024) was an American painter, sculptor, and printmaker, noted for his work in the areas of minimalism and post-painterly abstraction. He lived and worked in New York City for much of his career before moving his studio to Rock Tavern, New York. Stella's work catalyzed the minimalist movement in the late 1950s. He moved to New York City in the late 1950s, where he created works which emphasized the picture-as-object. These were influenced by the abstract expressionist work of artists like Franz Kline and Jackson Pollock.

He developed a reductionist approach to his art, saying he wanted to demonstrate that for him, every painting is "a flat surface with paint on it—nothing more", and disavowed conceptions of art as a means of expressing emotion. He won notice in the New York art world in 1959 when his four black pinstripe paintings were shown at the Museum of Modern Art. Stella was a recipient of the National Medal of Arts in 2009 and the Lifetime Achievement Award in Contemporary Sculpture by the International Sculpture Center in 2011.

== Biography ==
Frank Stella was born in Malden, Massachusetts, on May 12, 1936, to first-generation Italian-American parents, as the oldest of their three children. His grandparents on both sides had immigrated to the United States at the turn of the 20th century from Sicily. His father, Frank Sr., was a gynecologist, and his mother Constance (née Santonelli) was a housewife and artist who attended fashion school and later took up landscape painting. His father painted houses to pay his way through medical school, with young Stella as his helper. Many years later he told an interviewer, "My father would make me sand the floor; we had to do the sanding and scraping before you could hold the brush and then paint on the wall. So it was that kind of apprenticeship and familiarity."

Stella went to high school at Phillips Academy in Andover, Massachusetts, where Carl Andre, later to become a minimalist sculptor, was in the class ahead of him, but Andre said they never actually met. In his sophomore year, the abstractionist Patrick Morgan, a teacher at the school, began teaching Stella how to paint. At this time Stella was particularly affected by the work of the artist Josef Albers, a Bauhaus color theorist, and Hans Hofmann, an influential proto-Abstract Expressionist. After entering Princeton University where he majored in history, played lacrosse and wrestled, Stella took art courses and was introduced to the New York art scene by painter Stephen Greene and art historian William C. Seitz, professors at the school who brought him to exhibitions in the city. His work was influenced by abstract expressionism.

In the 1970s, he moved into NoHo in Manhattan in New York City. As of 2015, Stella lived in Greenwich Village and kept an office there but commuted on weekdays to his upstate studio at Rock Tavern, New York, in the Hudson River Valley. The critic and essayist Megan O'Grady visited the studio in 2019, and writing for the New York Times Style Magazine, described it as a "hangar-like structure", its entrance marked by a piece of wood spray-painted with the name "Stella". She called the interior a "vast space more easily traversed by golf cart than on foot", divided into separate rooms for fabrication and display, with a curtain hanging in the rear behind which he kept his spray-painter, his industrial sander, and new works being assembled.

== Work ==
=== Late 1950s and early 1960s ===
Jasper's Dilemma (1962–1963) at the National Gallery of Art in 2022

After moving to New York City in the late 1950s, Stella began to create works which emphasized the picture-as-object. His visits to the art galleries of New York, where he was exposed to the abstract expressionist work of artists like Franz Kline and Jackson Pollock, had exerted a great influence on his development as an artist.

He created a series of paintings in 1958–1959 known as his "Black Paintings" which flouted conventional ideas of painterly composition. At age 22 in late 1958, he used commercial enamel paint and a house-painter's brush to paint black stripes of the same width and evenly spaced on bare canvas, leaving the thin strips of canvas between them unpainted and exposed, along with his pencil-and-ruler drawn guidelines. These paintings, his response to the Abstract Expressionist movement that grew in the years following World War II, were devoid of color and meant to lack any visual stimulation.

Die Fahne Hoch! (1959), one of the "Black Paintings" series, takes its name ("Hoist the Flag!" or "Raise the Flag!" in English) from the first line of the "Horst-Wessel-Lied", the anthem of the Nazi Party. According to Stella himself, the painting has similar proportions as flags used by that organization.

Stella's work was a catalyst for the minimalist movement in the late 1950s; he stressed the properties of the materials he used in his paintings, disavowing any conception of art as a means of expressing emotion. He made a splash in the New York art world in 1959 when his four black pinstripe paintings were shown in the Sixteen Americans exhibit at the Museum of Modern Art, along with works by Louise Nevelson, Ellsworth Kelly, Jasper Johns, and Robert Rauschenberg. Taking a reductionist approach to his art, Stella said he sought to demonstrate that he considered every painting as "a flat surface with paint on it—nothing more". The same year, several of his paintings were included in the Three Young Americans showing at the Allen Memorial Art Museum at Oberlin College. A year later, his first gallery show at art dealer Leo Castelli's New York gallery gained him few sales. Stella shared studio space with Hollis Frampton and Carl Andre, both of whom had attended Phillips Academy, and scrounged a living by renting cold-water flats and painting houses.

Stella repudiated all efforts by critics to interpret his work. In a 1964 radio broadcast of a discussion of contemporary art with fellow artists Donald Judd and Dan Flavin, he summarized his concerns as a painter with the words, "My painting is based on the fact that only what can be seen there is there. It really is an object... All I want anyone to get out of my paintings, and all I ever get out of them, is the fact that you can see the whole idea without any confusion.... What you see is what you see." The much-quoted tautology, "What you see is what you see", became "the unofficial motto of the minimalist movement", according to the New York Times.

From 1960, his works used shaped canvases, developing in 1966 into more elaborate designs, as in the Irregular Polygon series (67). In 1961, Stella followed Barbara Rose, later a well-known art critic, to Pamplona, Spain, where she had gone on a Fulbright fellowship; they married in London that November. Upon their return to New York, Rose and Stella moved into an apartment near Union Square and had two children. After they split up in 1969, Rose began to reconsider her relationship with minimalism, and became a champion of less well-recognized painters.

=== Late 1960s and early 1970s ===
Frank Stella Harran II, 1967

In 1967, Stella designed the set and costumes for Scramble, a dance piece by Merce Cunningham. The same year, his began his Protractor Series (1967–71) of paintings, named after the common measuring instrument, a half circle protractor. These feature arcs, sometimes overlapping, within square borders named after circular-plan cities he had visited while in the Middle East earlier in the 1960s. He was especially intrigued by the arches and decorative patterns he observed in the architecture and art of Iran. His painting, Protractor Variation I (1969), now at the Pérez Art Museum Miami, epitomizes his move away from ascetic, monochrome compositions to the vibrant colors and formal complexity of his output after the late 1960s. This work typified his experimentation with shaped canvases, producing innovative paintings in which the imagery was set by their contours.

In 1969, Stella was commissioned to create a logo for the Metropolitan Museum of Art Centennial. The Museum of Modern Art in New York presented a retrospective of Stella's work in 1970, making him the youngest artist to receive one. Stella was among those artists invited to participate in the problem-plagued 35th Art Biennale in Venice (1970) who joined a boycott by artists opposed to the US wars in Vietnam and Cambodia and withdrew their works from display at the American Pavilion.

In the following decade, as he began to adopt more unusual color schemes and shapes, Stella brought to his artistic productions the element of relief, which he called "maximalist" painting because it had sculptural attributes. He presented wood and other materials in his Polish Village series (1970–1973), executed in high relief. They were inspired by photographs and drawings he saw of wooden synagogues that the Nazis had burned down in eastern Poland during World War II.

Stella abandoned rational structures in the mid-1970s and began to explore new, individualistic paths. He replaced solid planes with squiggles, lattices, and swirls of color. Composite features began to project from his canvases in all directions, while his wall-mounted paintings evolved into outlandish sculptures. Through the 1970s and 1980s, as his works became more uninhibited and intricate, his minimalism became baroque.

In 1976, Stella was commissioned by BMW to paint a BMW 3.0 CSL for the second installment in the BMW Art Car Series. He said of this project, "The starting point for the art cars was racing livery. The graph paper is what it is, a graph, but when it's morphed over the car's forms it becomes interesting. Theoretically it's like painting on a shaped canvas."

He married pediatrician Harriet McGurk in 1978.

=== 1980s and afterward ===
Frank Stella La scienza della fiacca, 1984, oil paint, enamel paint, and alkyd paint on canvas, etched magnesium, aluminum and fiberglass, National Gallery of Art, Washington DC

From the mid-1980s to the mid-1990s, Stella produced a large oeuvre that grappled with Herman Melville's novel Moby-Dick in a broad way. In this period of his career, as the relief of his paintings became increasingly higher with more undercutting, the process eventually resulted in fully three-dimensional sculptural forms that he derived from decorative architectural elements, and incorporating French curves, pillars, waves, and cones. To generate these works, he made collages or scale models that were subsequently enlarged to the original's specifications by his assistants, along with the use of digital technology and industrial metal cutters.

In 1993, he designed and executed for Toronto's Princess of Wales Theatre a 10,000-square-foot mural installation which covers the ceiling of the dome, the proscenium arch and the exterior rear wall of the building. The mural for the dome was based on computer-generated imagery. In 1997, he oversaw the installation of the 5,000-square-foot Euphonia at the Moores Opera House at the Rebecca and John J. Moores School of Music at the University of Houston, in Houston, Texas. A monumental sculpture of his, titled Prinz Friedrich von Homburg, Ein Schauspiel, 3X, was installed outside the National Gallery of Art in Washington, D.C.

From 1978 to 2005, Stella owned the Van Tassell and Kearney Horse Auction Mart building in Manhattan's East Village and used it as his studio which resulted in the facade being restored. After a six-year campaign by the Greenwich Village Society for Historic Preservation, the historic building was designated a New York City Landmark in 2012. After 2005, Stella split his time between his West Village apartment and his Newburgh, New York, studio.

The Scarlatti K series, begun in 2006, consists of eight works by Stella from his Scarlatti Kirkpatrick polychrome sculpture series, for which he used a 3D printer to create the metal and resin segments. The series title refers to the music of the Italian composer Domenico Scarlatti, known for his short but exuberant Baroque period harpsichord sonatas (he wrote more than 500 of them), and to Ralph Kirkpatrick, the American musicologist and harpsichordist, who brought Scarlatti's work to the attention of the listening public, and in 1953 produced the authoritative scholarly catalogue of the sonatas. Stella was inspired by the sonatas, and his series works, like the sonatas, are given "K" numbers, but they allude to Scarlatti's music abstractly with visual rhythm and movement, according to Stella, rather than literal correlation. Stella continued producing new works in the series into 2012. These were shown at the Freedman Art Gallery that year, and commenting about his work in the series, Stella said, "If you follow the edges of the lines, there's a sense of movement, and when they move well and the color follows, they become colorful, and that's what happens in the Scarlatti—it builds up and it moves...". Ron Labaco, a curator at the Museum of Arts and Design in New York, showed Stella's work in an exhibition featuring computer-enabled pieces, Out of Hand: Materialising the Postdigital (2013-14).

By the turn of the 2010s, Stella started using the computer as a painterly tool to produce stand-alone star-shaped sculptures. The resulting stars are often monochrome, black or beige or naturally metallic, and their points can take the form of solid planes, spindly lines or wire-mesh circuits. His Jasper's Split Star (2017), a sculpture constructed out of six small geometric grids that rest on an aluminum base, was installed at 7 World Trade Center in 2021. It was created to replace the large (each ten feet wide by ten feet tall) diptych of his paintings, Laestrygonia I and Telepilus Laestrygonia II, that had been displayed in the lobby of the original World Trade Center, destroyed in the September 11, 2001 terrorist attacks on New York City.

In late 2022, Stella launched his first NFT (non-fungible token) for his Geometries project in collaboration with the Artists Rights Society (ARS). It includes the right to the CAD files to 3D print the art works in the NFTs. Katarina Feder, director of business development at ARS, said, "We sold out all 2,100 tokens, and, importantly, brought in resale royalties for secondary sales, something that Frank has been championing for decades."

== Artists' rights ==
On June 1, 2008, Stella, a member artist of the Artists Rights Society published with ARS president Theodore Feder an op-ed for The Art Newspaper decrying a proposed U.S. Orphan Works law which "remove[s] the penalty for copyright infringement if the creator of a work, after a diligent search, cannot be located".

In the op-ed, Stella wrote,

The Copyright Office presumes that the infringers it would let off the hook would be those who had made a "good faith, reasonably diligent" search for the copyright holder. Unfortunately, it is totally up to the infringer to decide if he has made a good faith search.

The Copyright Office proposal would have a disproportionately negative, even catastrophic, impact on the ability of painters and illustrators to make a living from selling copies of their work.

== Exhibitions ==
Stella's work was included in several exhibitions in the 1960s, among them the Solomon R. Guggenheim Museum's The Shaped Canvas (1965) and Systemic Painting (1966). The Museum of Modern Art in New York presented a second retrospective of Stella's work in 1970.

The exhibition "Frank Stella and Synagogues of Historic Poland", was on view at the POLIN Museum in Warsaw through June 20, 2016. The series of paintings on display, Polish Village (1970–74), had previously been exhibited at other venues, including the Fort Worth Museum of Dallas in 1978, the Museum of Modern Art in New York in 1987, and the Jewish Museum in New York in 1983. The paintings were inspired by photographs and drawings he saw of wooden synagogues that the Nazis had burned down in eastern Poland during World War II. They came from Maria and Kazimierz Piechotka's book Wooden Synagogues (Arkady, 1959), and were themselves part of the exhibition.

In 2012, a retrospective of Stella's career was shown at the Kunstmuseum Wolfsburg.

In 2015 the Modern Art Museum of Fort Worth and the Whitney Museum of American Art co-organized Frank Stella: A Retrospective. The exhibit included a wide range of Stella's oeuvre. It was exhibited at the Whitney Museum of American Art (October 30, 2015 - February 7, 2016), Modern Art Museum of Fort Worth (April 17 - September 18, 2016) and de Young Museum, San Francisco (November 5, 2016 - February 26, 2017). The catalog was written by Michael Auping. In conjunction with the retrospective, the de Young Museum also exhibited Frank Stella's Prints.

Stella was one of five featured artists in the 2024 exhibition 'Friend, A Survey of Op-Art and Minimalism' at the Ki Smith Gallery. The exhibition benefitted Sentebale, a Lesotho based charity co-founded by Prince Harry and Prince Seeiso. Stella's piece 'Blyvoors' (1982), from part of his acclaimed South African Mine series was shown alongside works by Bridget Riley, Agnes Martin, and others.

== Collections ==
In 2014, Stella gave his sculpture Adjoeman (2004) as a long-term loan to Cedars-Sinai Medical Center in Los Angeles. His works are in the collections of many major art institutions, including the San Francisco Museum of Modern Art; Whitney Museum of American Art, New York; the Hirshhorn Museum and Sculpture Garden; the Museum of Fine Arts, Boston; the Art Institute of Chicago; the Pérez Art Museum Miami; the List Visual Arts Center at Massachusetts Institute of Technology, Cambridge; the Tate; the Peggy Guggenheim Collection, Venice; and the Kunstmuseum Basel.

== Recognition ==
Stella gave the Charles Eliot Norton Lectures in 1984, calling for a rejuvenation of abstraction by achieving the depth of baroque painting. These six talks were published by Harvard University Press in 1986 under the title Working Space.

In 2009, Frank Stella was awarded the National Medal of Arts by President Barack Obama. In 2011, he received the Lifetime Achievement Award in Contemporary Sculpture by the International Sculpture Center. In 1996, he received an honorary Doctorate from the University of Jena in Jena, Germany, where his large sculptures of the Hudson River Valley series are on permanent display, becoming the second artist to receive this honorary degree after Auguste Rodin in 1906.

He was heralded by the Birmingham Museum of Art for having created abstract paintings that bear "no pictorial illusions or psychological or metaphysical references in twentieth-century painting".

== Critical reception ==
Writer and curator Klaus Ottmann says many art critics were outraged when Stella's Black Paintings (1958–60) were shown at the Museum of Modern Art's "16 Americans" (1959-1960) exhibition. Irving Sandler attributed the death of American gesture painting to the mortal blow dealt by these reductive and non-allusive paintings. According to Ottman, "Today, they are universally considered seminal works of 20th-century American art."

According to critic Megan O'Grady, art critics were shocked by the "Black Paintings", with their purposely flat affect, their extreme reductiveness, and their "refusal to appease". In her view, the young artist had been inspired by the artists he admired in New York, among them Barnett Newman, Jackson Pollock, and Willem de Kooning, and felt that he was allowed freedom to do whatever he wanted with painting. She writes that critics have always been disconcerted by the fact that "the godfather of Minimalist painting" became a forbear of modern baroque.

The art historian and critic Douglas Crimp writes that the notion of art as existing detached from everything else and autonomous proceeds from the logic of modernism, and is a notion maintained by contemporary painting into the 1980s. Painting is understood as having an origin and an essential nature, and its historical development as being a long, unbroken panorama. According to Crimp, the stylistic change that occurred during the late 1970s in Frank Stella's work embodied this art historical view of painting and how it operates to maintain the practice of painting. By his lights, Stella's shift to the "flamboyantly idiosyncratic constructed works" of this period was "a kind of quantum leap" compared to his breakout works of the late 1950s.

For Crimp it was Stella's earliest paintings which suggested to his fellows that the end of painting had at last arrived. He sees Stella as working in profound torment over the inferences made by those early works, moving ever further away from them, and disavowing them more vehemently with every new series. Crimp goes on to say the late 1970s paintings "are truly hysterical in their defiance of the black paintings; each one reads as a tantrum, shrieking and sputtering that the end of painting has not come".

Viewing some of Stella's large scale works at a 1982 exhibition in the Addison Gallery at the Phillips Academy, critic Kenneth Baker voiced a dissenting opinion. He wrote in The Boston Phoenix that "The physical impact of the recent works is unsettling. They make you want to back away; you're not sure how firmly they're anchored to the wall. But soon you realize that any object of comparable size might have the same impact. That this question arises at all suggests how small a part 'painting' plays here. Stella's style resides wholly in the design of these objects, and their designs are just not that interesting to contemplate."

When the Whitney Museum of American Art exhibited its Frank Stella retrospective in 2015, art critic Jerry Saltz reminded viewers that Stella had declared "I don't make Conceptual Art. I need the physical thing to work with or against." Saltz advised them to think literally, and in terms of the space the works occupy and the nature of their surfaces, seeing color as an element of their structures. He described Stella as being one of "the first to deal as directly as possible with the perception of material, form, and color", "the first hard-core Minimalist painter", and "a forerunner to the Postminimalism that defined the late 1960s and 1970s". Saltz goes on to say "even though he's prone to cranking out a lot of work that looks like God-awful space junk, I always pay attention to this artist".

== Art market ==
In May 2019, Christie's set an auction record for one of Stella's works with the sale of his Point of Pines, which sold for $28 million.

In April 2021, his Scramble: Ascending Spectrum/Ascending Green Values (1977) was sold for £2.4 million ($3.2 million with premium) in London. The painting was bought for $1.9 million in 2006 from the collection of Belgian art patrons Roger and Josette Vanthournout at Sotheby's.

== Squash player ==
In the 1980s, Stella took up the game of squash after he injured his back while opening a garage door. His racquet was strung with five bright colors. He later had a squash court built at his horse farm in upstate New York, and formed close friendships with many squash players. In 1986 he told Nicholas Dawidoff, a writer for Sports Illustrated: "The advantage of squash is that I can forget about painting. A white blank and a ball; you don't know where you are. It's like a snowstorm." Being interviewed in 1987 by Susan Orlean of The New Yorker, he quipped, "In art, you can keep getting better, but in squash you hit your level and that's just about it. Curtains. You're finished. I hit my limit at about forty minutes of mediocre playing."

Speaking of Stella after his death, Ned Edwards, the executive director of the U.S. Squash Foundation, said that "Frank was a transformational figure for squash." The director of the Tournament of Champions, John Nimick, said, "Frank was a patron saint of our sport and various efforts to promote squash in New York City for forty years. He was a player, promoter, sponsor and creator of our perpetual trophy."

== Personal life and death ==
From 1961 to 1969, Stella was married to art historian Barbara Rose; they had two children, Rachel and Michael. At the time of his death, he was married to Harriet E. McGurk, a pediatrician. They had two sons, Patrick and Peter. He also had a daughter, Laura, from a relationship with Shirley De Lemos Wyse between his marriages.

Stella died of lymphoma at his home in West Village, Manhattan, on May 4, 2024, eight days before his 88th birthday.

== Gallery of works ==
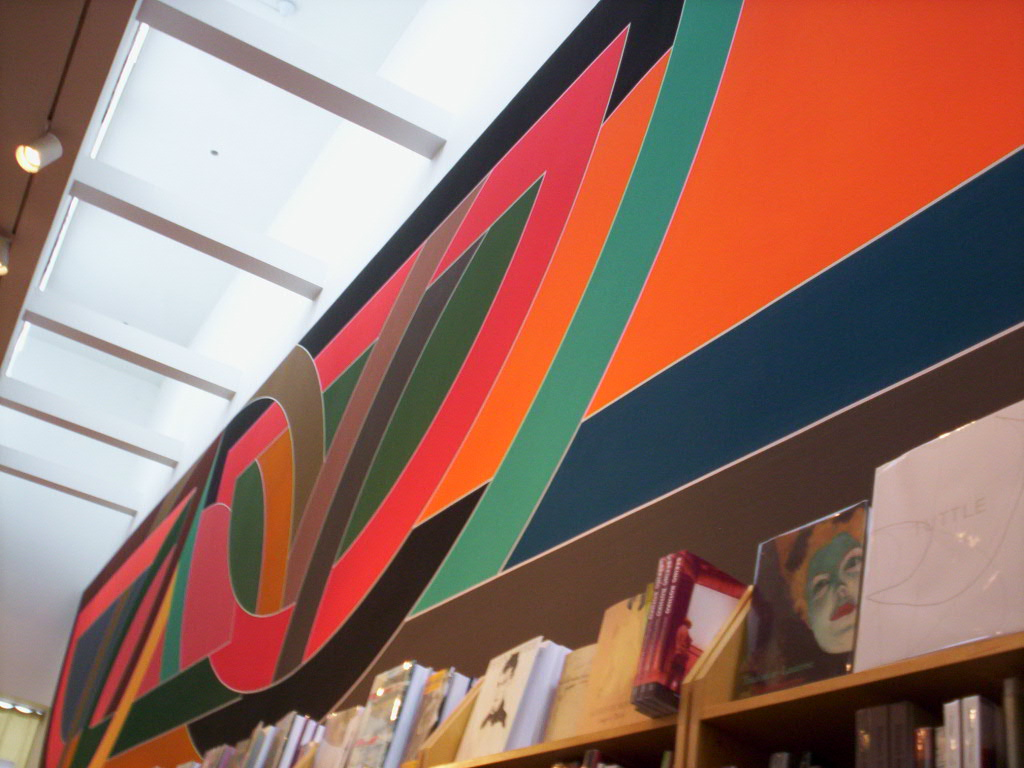
Frank Stella, mural at 'David Mirvish Books', 1974; in Toronto

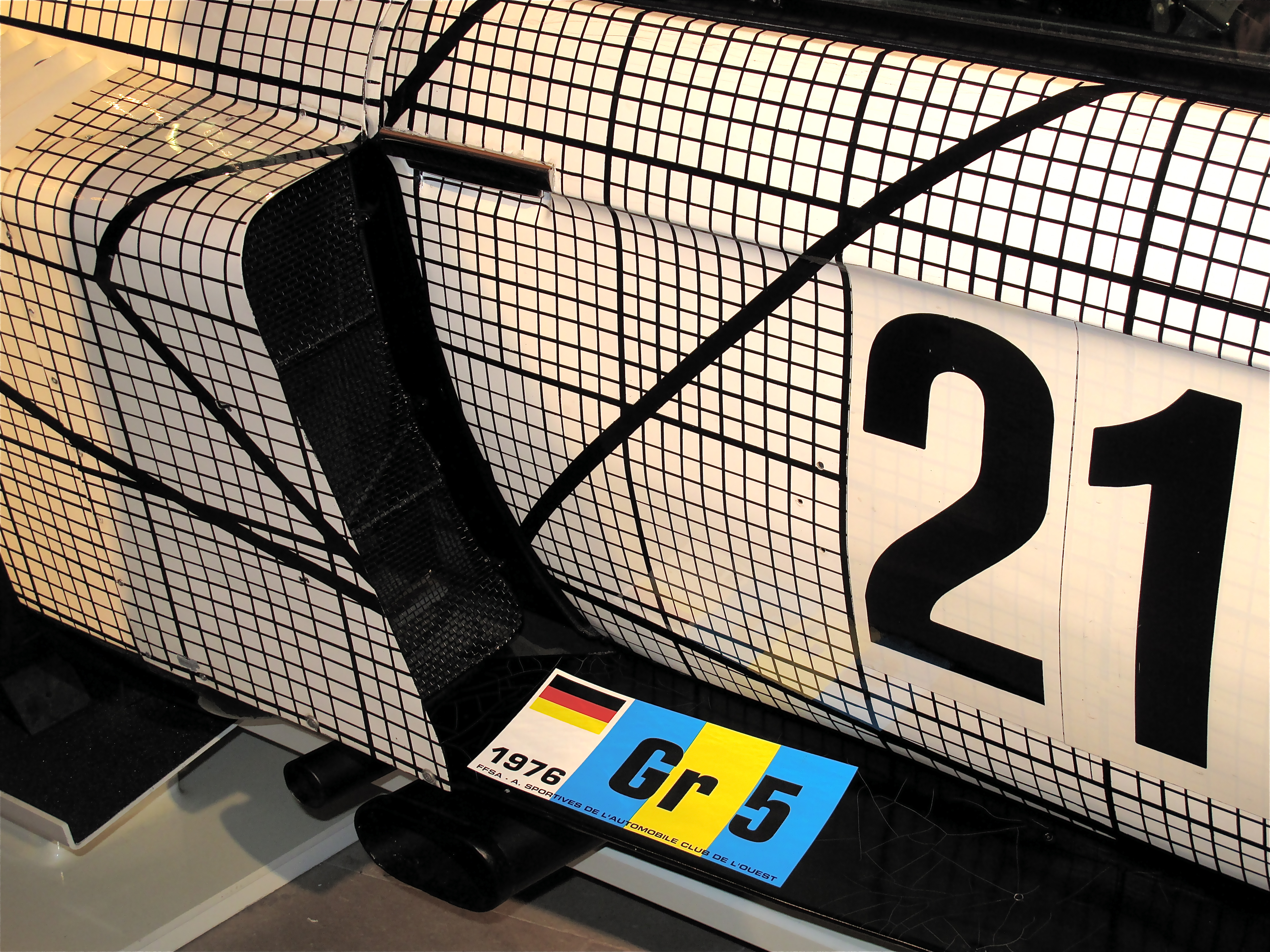
Stella, detail of BMW 3.0 CSL car-painting, 1976

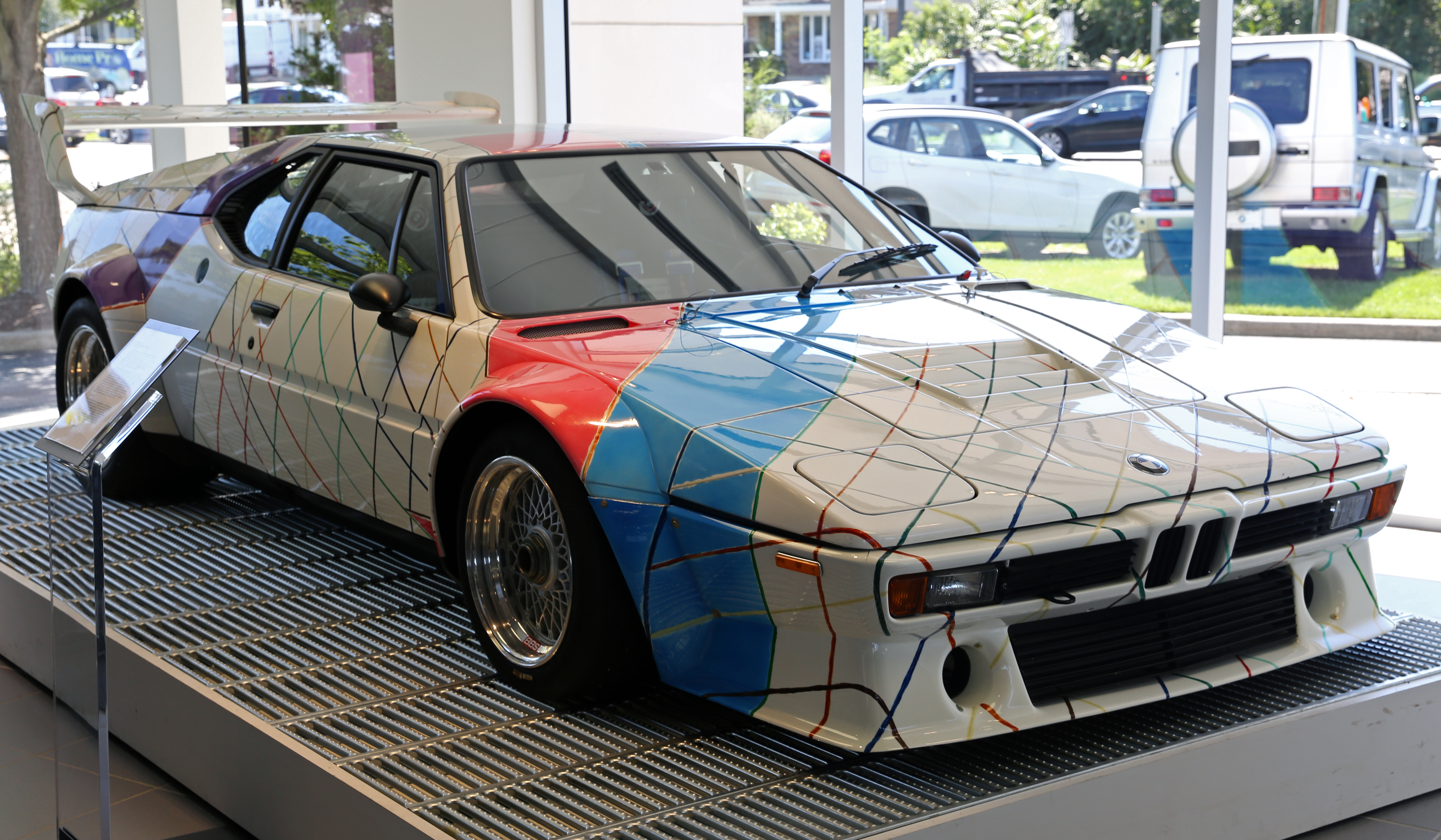
Stella, BMW M1 Pro car-painting, 1979; commissioned by Peter Gregg

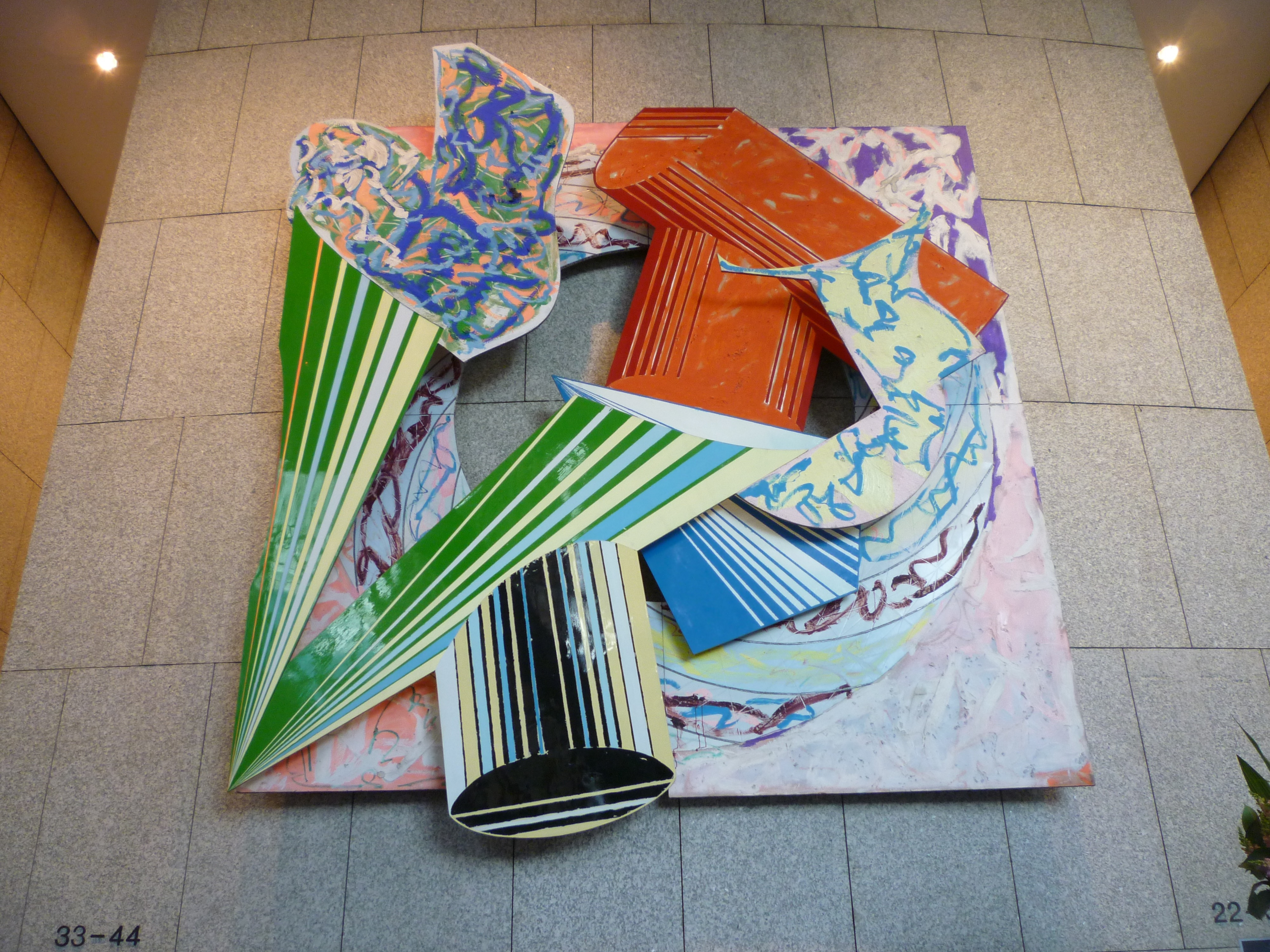
Stella, Cones and Pillars, part 2., c. 1984; painting

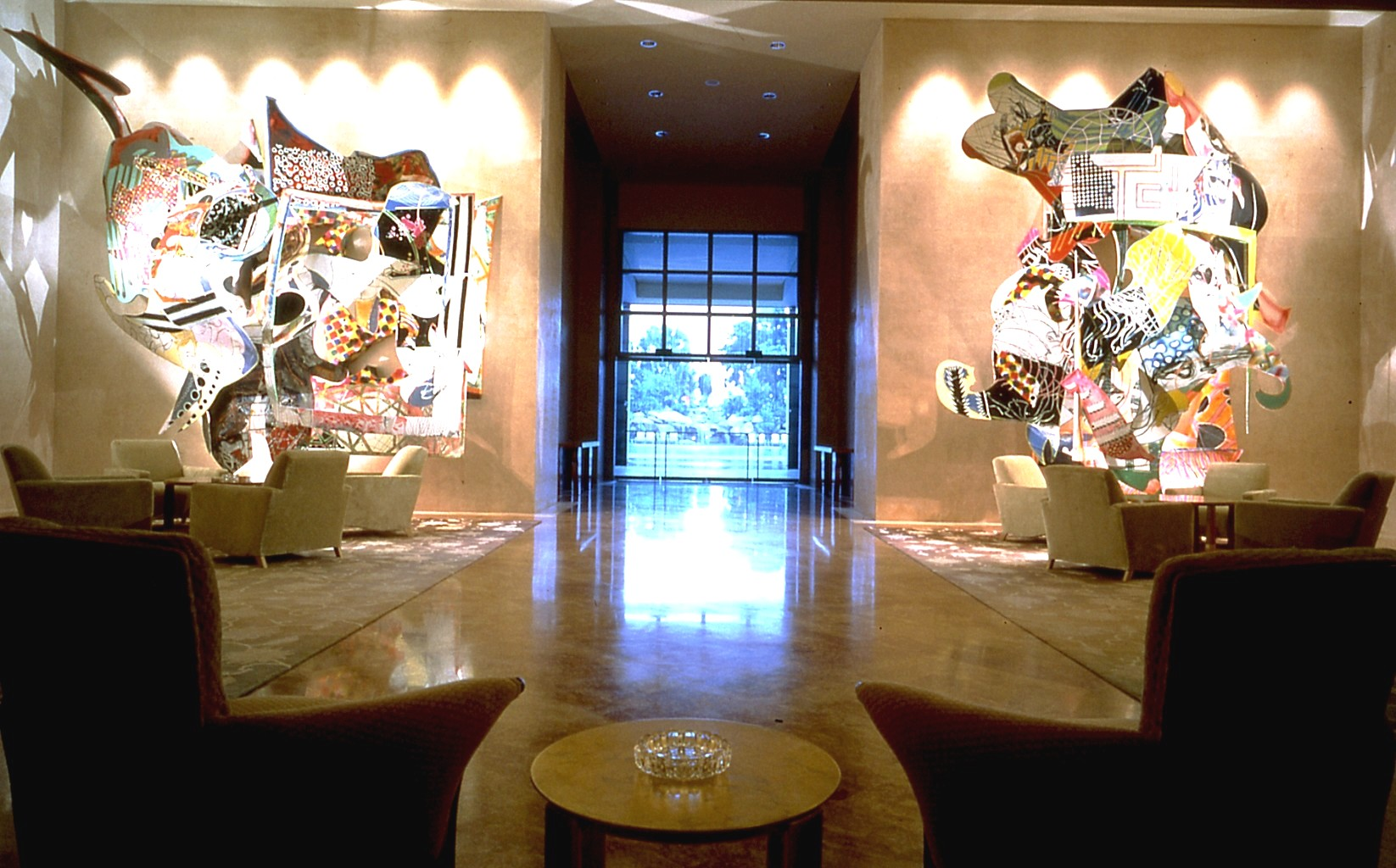
Stella, Moby Dick, 1991–1993; wall-relief in The Ritz-Carlton, Singapore

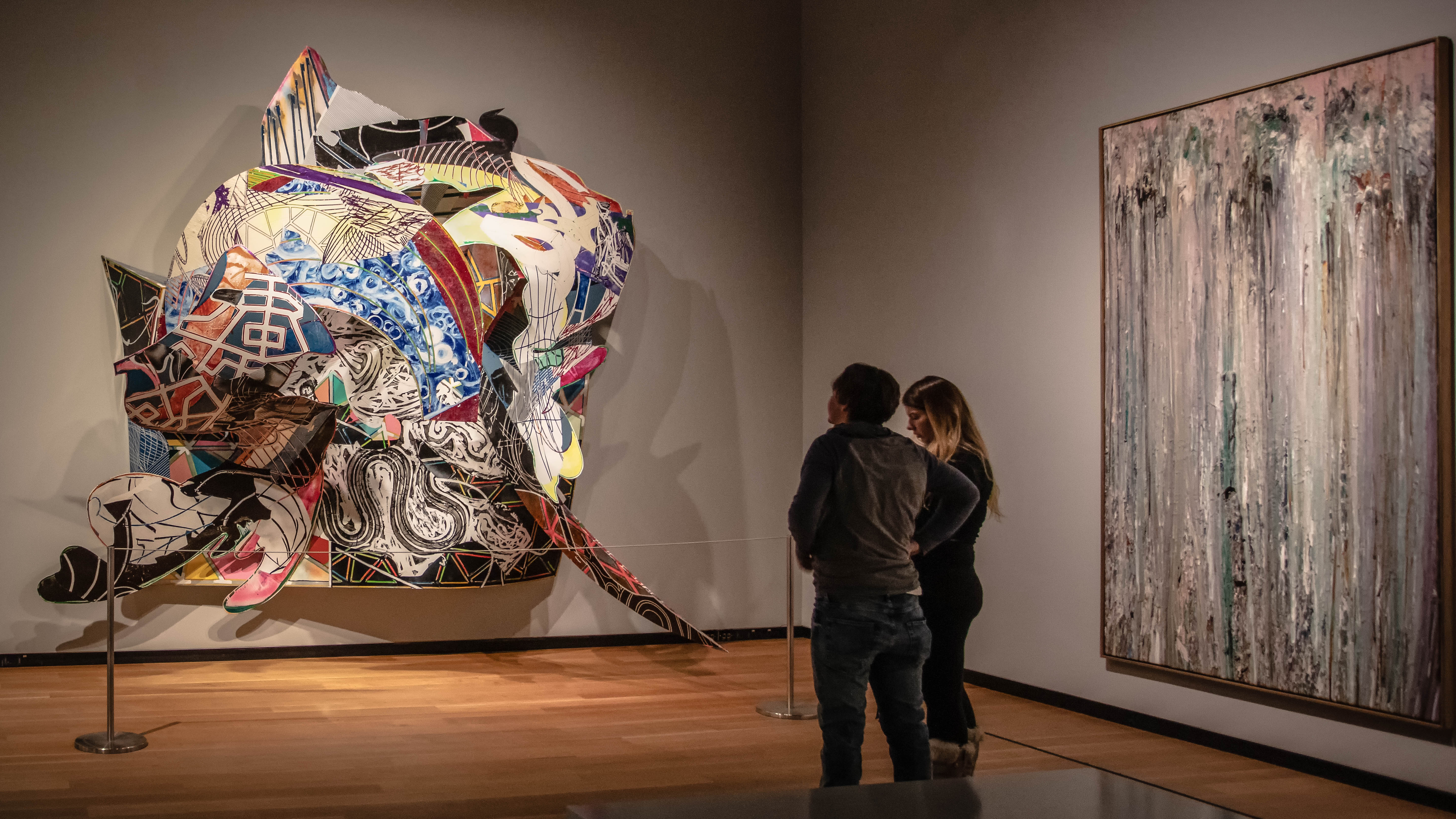
Moby Dick at the Museum of Fine Arts, Montreal

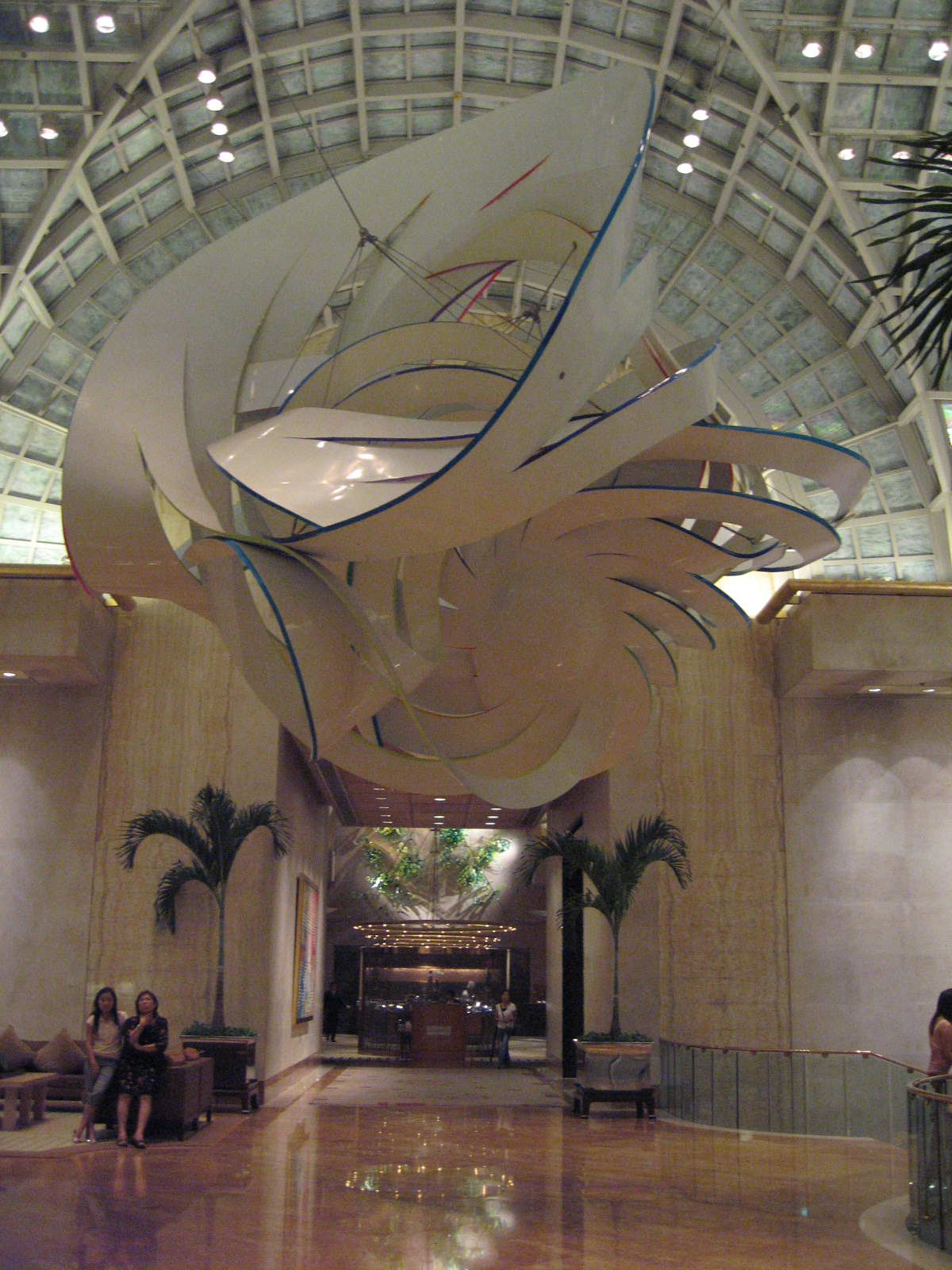
Stella, Cornucopia, c. 2000; sculpture in fiberglass

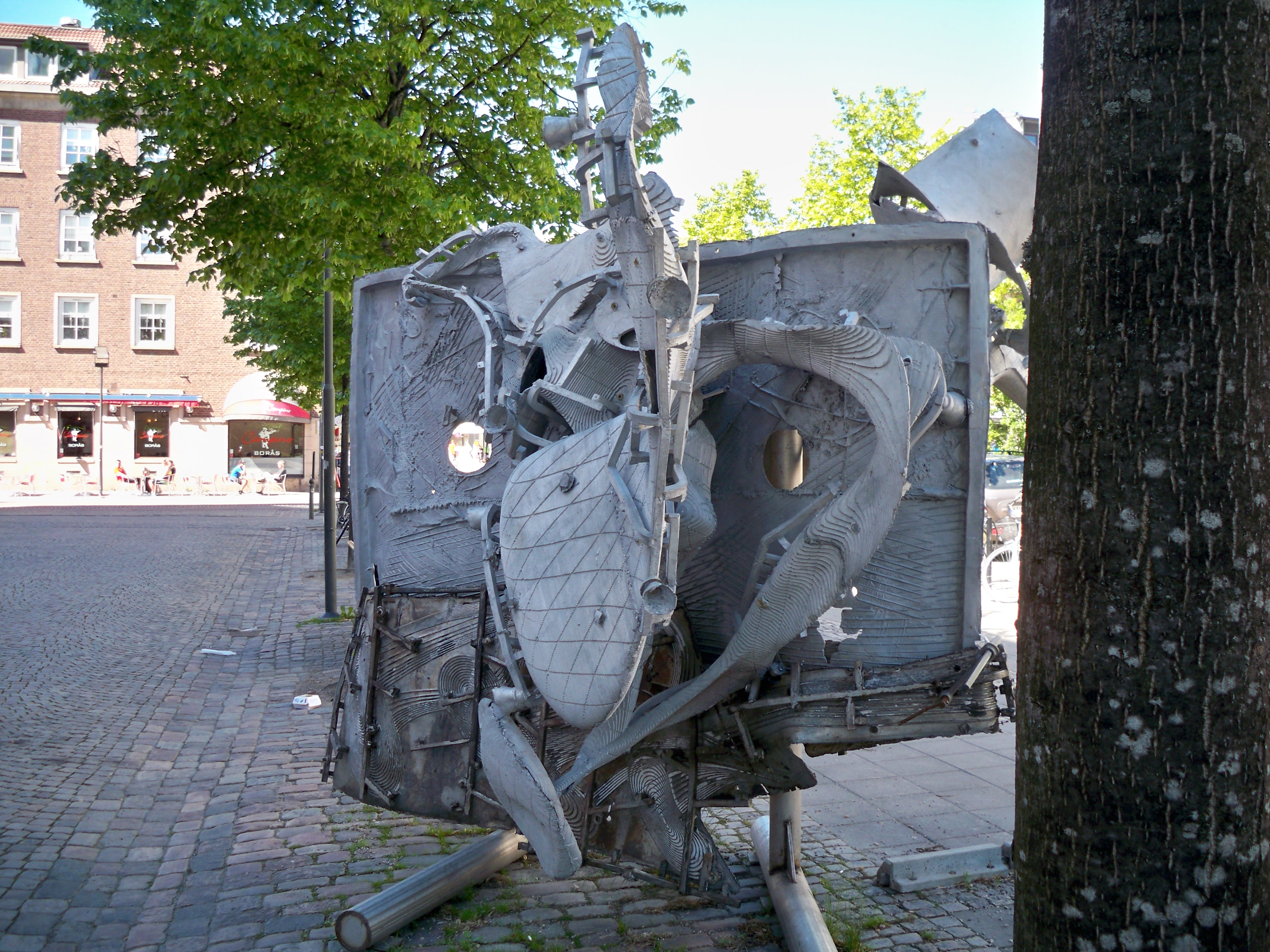
Stella, Çatal Hüyük, 2008; location, Hallbergsplatsen, Borås

== Selected bibliography ==
- Julia M. Busch: A Decade of Sculpture: the 1960s, Associated University Presses, Plainsboro, 1974; ISBN 0-87982-007-1
- Frank Stella and Siri Engberg: Frank Stella at Tyler Graphics, Walker Art Center, Minneapolis, 1997; ISBN 9780935640588
- Frank Stella and Franz-Joachim Verspohl: The Writings of Frank Stella. Die Schriften Frank Stellas, Verlag der Buchhandlung König, Cologne, 2001; ISBN 3-88375-487-0, ISBN 978-3-88375-487-1 (bilingual)
- Frank Stella and Franz-Joachim Verspohl: Heinrich von Kleist by Frank Stella, Verlag der Buchhandlung König, Cologne, 2001; ISBN 3-88375-488-9, ISBN 978-3-88375-488-8 (bilingual)
- Michael Auping: Frank Stella: A Retrospective, Yale University Press, New Haven, 2015; ISBN 978-0-300-21544-1
- Andrianna Campbell, Kate Nesin, Lucas Blalock, Terry Richardson: Frank Stella, Phaidon, London, 2017; ISBN 9780714874593
