= Die Fahne Hoch! (Frank Stella) =

1959 painting by Frank Stella

- Artist: Frank Stella
- Year: 1959
- Type: Enamel paint on canvas
- Dimensions: 308.6 cm × 185.4 cm (121.5 in × 73.0 in)
- Location: Whitney Museum of American Art; New York

Die Fahne Hoch! is an enamel on canvas painting by American artist Frank Stella, completed in 1959. It is held at the Whitney Museum of American Art, in New York.

== Description and analysis ==
The use of basic geometric systems in the work is regarded by many as the precursor of Minimalism. The painting was made by marking equal subdivisions along the sides, bottom and top edges of the canvas and using these intervals to generate simple, symmetrical patterns consisting of bands of black enamel paint separated by thin lines of unpainted canvas.

Stella gave the work a provocative title, Die Fahne Hoch!, which means Raise the Flag!, in German, that is first line of the anthem of the Nazi Party, the "Horst-Wessel-Lied", and is one of three paintings in the series that make direct reference to Nazism. By applying a hotly emotive title to the image, Stella's ironic purpose was that of destabilizing the idea of meaning itself.

The Whitney Museum of American Art website states that "the painting's title, cruciform configuration, and flaglike proportions call to mind not only Nazi banners but the darkness and annihilation of the Holocaust. The phrase may also refer to raising the banner of a new aesthetic, one that marked a shift away from Abstract Expressionism and anticipated the geometry and rigor of Minimalism."
