= Meanings of minor-planet names: 57001–58000 =

As minor planet discoveries are confirmed, they are given a permanent number by the IAU's Minor Planet Center (MPC), and the discoverers can then submit names for them, following the IAU's naming conventions. The list below concerns those minor planets in the specified number-range that have received names, and explains the meanings of those names.

Official naming citations of newly named small Solar System bodies are approved and published in a bulletin by IAU's Working Group for Small Bodies Nomenclature (WGSBN). Before May 2021, citations were published in MPC's Minor Planet Circulars for many decades. Recent citations can also be found on the JPL Small-Body Database (SBDB). Until his death in 2016, German astronomer Lutz D. Schmadel compiled these citations into the Dictionary of Minor Planet Names (DMP) and regularly updated the collection.

Based on Paul Herget's The Names of the Minor Planets, Schmadel also researched the unclear origin of numerous asteroids, most of which had been named prior to World War II. This article incorporates text from this source, which is in the public domain: SBDB New namings may only be added to this list below after official publication as the preannouncement of names is condemned. The WGSBN publishes a comprehensive guideline for the naming rules of non-cometary small Solar System bodies.

== 57001–57100 ==
Named minor planet	Provisional	This minor planet was named for...	Ref · Catalog
57076 Mariocambi	2001 OY_{16}	Mario Cambi (b. 1948), an Italian amateur astronomer.	IAU · 57076

== 57101–57200 ==
back to top

Named minor planet	Provisional	This minor planet was named for...	Ref · Catalog
57140 Gaddi	2001 PG_{29}	Riccardo Gaddi, amateur astronomer and popular expositor	JPL · 57140

== 57201–57300 ==
back to top

Named minor planet	Provisional	This minor planet was named for...	Ref · Catalog
There are no named minor planets in this number range

== 57301–57400 ==
back to top

Named minor planet	Provisional	This minor planet was named for...	Ref · Catalog
57359 Robcrawford	2001 RC	Robert W. Crawford, American energy and environmental consultant, amateur astronomer and physicist	JPL · 57359

== 57401–57500 ==
back to top

Named minor planet	Provisional	This minor planet was named for...	Ref · Catalog
57424 Caelumnoctu	2001 SP_{22}	(19)57–4–24, 1957 April 24, is the date of the transmission of the first edition of the BBC television series The Sky at Night (Caelum noctu in Latin)	JPL · 57424
57471 Mariemarsina	2001 SZ_{115}	Marie Marsina (born 1952) currently serves as the President of the National Art League in New York City and as Vice President of the Douglaston Civic Association. She is a graduate of Pace University's Lubin School of Business.	JPL · 57471

== 57501–57600 ==
back to top

Named minor planet	Provisional	This minor planet was named for...	Ref · Catalog
57509 Sly	2001 SY_{270}	Sylvestre (Sly) Maurice (born 1966), a planetary astronomer specialized in lunar and Martian exploration. He has been a lead-developer of Martian rover instruments.	JPL · 57509
57561 Gabrielegiuli	2001 TA_{48}	Gabriele Giuli, Italian mineralogist who is an Associate Professor of Mineralogy at the University of Camerino, Italy.	IAU · 57561
57567 Crikey	2001 TS_{56}	Steve Irwin (1962–2006), an Australian zookeeper and conservationist, known for his TV-series The Crocodile Hunter. "Crikey!", was his signature phrase.	JPL · 57567

== 57601–57700 ==
back to top

Named minor planet	Provisional	This minor planet was named for...	Ref · Catalog
57658 Nilrem	2001 UJ_{1}	Jean-Claude Merlin (born 1954), French astronomer, founder-president of the Burgundy Astronomical Society (French: Société astronomique de Bourgogne) and discoverer of minor planets. "Nilrem" is "Merlin" backwards, because of pre-existing 2598 Merlin.	MPC · 57658

== 57701–57800 ==
back to top

Named minor planet	Provisional	This minor planet was named for...	Ref · Catalog
There are no named minor planets in this number range

== 57801–57900 ==
back to top

Named minor planet	Provisional	This minor planet was named for...	Ref · Catalog
57868 Pupin	2001 YD	Mihajlo Pupin (1858–1935), a Serbian-American physicist and humanitarian.	JPL · 57868
57879 Cesarechiosi	2002 AD_{1}	Cesare Chiosi, Italian professor of theoretical astrophysics at the University of Padua	JPL · 57879

== 57901–58000 ==
back to top

Named minor planet	Provisional	This minor planet was named for...	Ref · Catalog
57901 Hitchens	2002 CH_{275}	Christopher Hitchens (1949–2011) was a social, religious and literary critic of broad interests, who listed "disputation" among his hobbies	JPL · 57901
57915 Mahuchikh	2002 EB_{110}	Yaroslava Mahuchikh, Ukrainian high jumper and Olympic champion.	IAU · 57915

back to top

Preceded by 56,001–57,000	Meanings of minor-planet names List of minor planets: 57,001–58,000	Succeeded by 58,001–59,000
