= Hitchens =

Hitchens is a surname of early medieval English origin. Notable people with the surname include:

- Alfred Hitchens (1861–1942), English painter
- Anthony Hitchens (born 1992), American football linebacker
- Bob Hitchens (1952–2020), American college football player
- Christopher Hitchens (1949–2011), British-American author, journalist and broadcaster
- Dolores Hitchens (1907–1973), American mystery novelist
- Gerry Hitchens (1934–1983), English footballer
- Ivon Hitchens (1893–1979), English painter
- John Hitchens (born 1940), English painter
- Peter Hitchens (born 1951), British author, journalist and broadcaster
- Robert Hichens (disambiguation), various people
  - Robert Smythe Hichens (1864–1950), English writer
  - Robert Hichens (RMS Titanic) (1882–1940), quartermaster on the RMS Titanic
  - Robert Peverell Hichens (1909–1943), RNVR officer in the Second World War
- Tim Hitchens (born 1962), British diplomat

Characters

- Grace Hitchens, character in Glee

== Others ==
- Hitchens's razor, an epistemological razor asserting that the burden of proof regarding the truthfulness of a claim lies with the one who makes the claim, and if this burden is not met, the claim is unfounded, and its opponents need not argue further to dismiss it; introduced by and named after Christopher Hitchens
- Hitchens Pond, pond located east of Barber Point, New York

== See also ==
- 57901 Hitchens
- Hitchen
- Hitchins
