= Judith Dunn =

British psychologist and academic

Professor Judith Dunn FBA FMedSci
- Born: Judith Frances Pace; 1939 (age 86–87); Hitchen, Hertfordshire, UK
- Spouses: Martin Bernal (1961–?; div); John Dunn (m. 1973; div. 1987) Robert Plomin (m. 1987)
- Children: Three

Academic background
- Education: New Hall, Cambridge; King's College, Cambridge

Academic work
- Discipline: Psychology
- Sub-discipline: Developmental psychology; Social development; Development of language and communication
- Institutions: King's College, Cambridge; Pennsylvania State University; King's College London

Judith Frances Dunn, FBA, FMedSci (nee Pace, born 1939) is a British psychologist and academic, who specialises in social developmental psychology.

== Early life and education ==
Dunn was the daughter of James Pace and Jean Stewart and was born in Hitchen, Hertfordshire. She studied at New Hall, Cambridge, graduating with a Bachelor of Arts (BA) degree in 1962; as per tradition, her BA was promoted to a Master of Arts (MA Cantab) degree in 1968. While a fellow of King's College, Cambridge, she undertook postgraduate research and she completed her Doctor of Philosophy (PhD) degree in 1982.

== Academic career ==
From 1978 to 1986, Dunn was a Fellow of King's College, Cambridge, and a Medical Research Council Senior Scientific Officer. From 1986 to 1995, she was Professor of Human Development at Pennsylvania State University. In 1994, she was made an Evan Pugh Professor; an Evan Pugh Professorship is the "highest honor the institution can give to a member of its faculty". From 1995 to 2012, she was Professor of Developmental Psychology at the Institute of Psychiatry, King's College, London.

Dunn specializes in children's social emotional and sociocognitive development, parent-child, sibling and peer relationships, and the development of language and communication abilities.

=== Other work ===
Dunn is Chair of The Children's Society's Good Childhood Inquiry, established in 2006, which explores and measures children’s subjective well-being.

== Personal life ==
In 1961, the then Judith Pace married Martin Gardiner Bernal, a British scholar of modern Chinese political history who also wrote the controversial Black Athena. Together, they had one daughter and twin sons. They later divorced. From 1973 to 1987, she was married to John Montfort Dunn, a British political theorist, before they too divorced. In 1987, she married the American psychologist Robert Plomin.

== Honours ==
In 1996, Dunn was elected a Fellow of the British Academy (FBA), the United Kingdom's national academy for humanities and social sciences. In 2000, she was elected a Fellow of the Academy of Medical Sciences (FMedSci).

== Selected works ==
- Dunn, Judy (1988). The beginnings of social understanding. Cambridge, MA: Harvard University Press. ISBN 978-0674064539.
- Booth, Alan; Dunn, Judith F., eds. (1994). Stepfamilies: who benefits? who does not?. Hillsdale, N.J.: L. Erlbaum. ISBN 978-0805815443.
- Alan Booth; Judith F. Dunn, eds. (1996), Family-School Links: How Do They Affect Educational Outcomes?, Lawrence Erlbaum Associates, ISBN 0805818405
- Dunn, Judith; Deater-Deckard, Kirby (2001), Children's views of their changing families, Family change series, York Publishing Services, ISBN 9781842630310
