= List of minor planets: 57001–58000 =

The following is a partial list of minor planets, running from minor-planet number 57001 through 58000, inclusive. The primary data for this and other partial lists is based on JPL's "Small-Body Orbital Elements" and data available from the Minor Planet Center. Critical list information is also provided by the MPC, unless otherwise specified from Lowell Observatory. A detailed description of the table's columns and additional sources are given on the main page including a complete list of every page in this series, and a statistical break-up on the dynamical classification of minor planets.

Also see the summary list of all named bodies in numerical and alphabetical order, and the corresponding naming citations for the number range of this particular list. New namings may only be added to this list after official publication, as the preannouncement of names is condemned by the Working Group for Small Bodies Nomenclature of the International Astronomical Union.

Near-Earth obj.	MBA (inner)	MBA (outer)	Centaur
Mars-crosser	MBA (middle)	Jupiter trojan	Trans-Neptunian obj.
Unclassified

== 57001–57100 ==
Designation			Discovery			Properties		Ref
Permanent	Provisional	Named after	Date	Site	Discoverer(s)	Category	Diam.	Ref
57001	2000 SO_{327}	—	September 30, 2000	Socorro	LINEAR	·	3.9 km	MPC · JPL
57002	2000 ST_{343}	—	September 23, 2000	Socorro	LINEAR	·	5.6 km	MPC · JPL
57003	2000 SL_{349}	—	September 30, 2000	Anderson Mesa	LONEOS	·	9.8 km	MPC · JPL
57004	2000 SP_{349}	—	September 28, 2000	Anderson Mesa	LONEOS	·	3.9 km	MPC · JPL
57005	2000 ST_{349}	—	September 29, 2000	Anderson Mesa	LONEOS	EOS	5.5 km	MPC · JPL
57006	2000 SU_{354}	—	September 29, 2000	Anderson Mesa	LONEOS	·	8.1 km	MPC · JPL
57007	2000 SH_{356}	—	September 29, 2000	Anderson Mesa	LONEOS	URS	9.2 km	MPC · JPL
57008	2000 SV_{356}	—	September 28, 2000	Anderson Mesa	LONEOS	EUN	3.8 km	MPC · JPL
57009	2000 SK_{357}	—	September 28, 2000	Anderson Mesa	LONEOS	·	6.6 km	MPC · JPL
57010	2000 TP_{1}	—	October 3, 2000	Prescott	P. G. Comba	·	6.7 km	MPC · JPL
57011	2000 TO_{18}	—	October 1, 2000	Socorro	LINEAR	·	5.2 km	MPC · JPL
57012	2000 TA_{21}	—	October 1, 2000	Socorro	LINEAR	VER	7.2 km	MPC · JPL
57013	2000 TD_{39}	—	October 1, 2000	Socorro	LINEAR	L5	24 km	MPC · JPL
57014	2000 TM_{39}	—	October 1, 2000	Socorro	LINEAR	·	9.4 km	MPC · JPL
57015	2000 TH_{40}	—	October 1, 2000	Socorro	LINEAR	·	6.1 km	MPC · JPL
57016	2000 TY_{41}	—	October 1, 2000	Socorro	LINEAR	·	4.4 km	MPC · JPL
57017	2000 TC_{42}	—	October 1, 2000	Socorro	LINEAR	EOS	4.9 km	MPC · JPL
57018	2000 TA_{46}	—	October 1, 2000	Anderson Mesa	LONEOS	·	6.0 km	MPC · JPL
57019	2000 TQ_{57}	—	October 2, 2000	Anderson Mesa	LONEOS	EUN	4.1 km	MPC · JPL
57020	2000 TX_{58}	—	October 2, 2000	Anderson Mesa	LONEOS	EUN	4.4 km	MPC · JPL
57021	2000 TG_{59}	—	October 2, 2000	Anderson Mesa	LONEOS	slow	11 km	MPC · JPL
57022	2000 TK_{64}	—	October 5, 2000	Socorro	LINEAR	·	9.2 km	MPC · JPL
57023	2000 UH_{10}	—	October 24, 2000	Socorro	LINEAR	·	6.3 km	MPC · JPL
57024	2000 UD_{23}	—	October 24, 2000	Socorro	LINEAR	·	9.6 km	MPC · JPL
57025	2000 UO_{24}	—	October 24, 2000	Socorro	LINEAR	·	4.9 km	MPC · JPL
57026	2000 UD_{55}	—	October 24, 2000	Socorro	LINEAR	·	8.3 km	MPC · JPL
57027	2000 UB_{59}	—	October 25, 2000	Socorro	LINEAR	3:2 · moon	11 km	MPC · JPL
57028	2000 UJ_{60}	—	October 25, 2000	Socorro	LINEAR	HYG	6.2 km	MPC · JPL
57029	2000 UY_{65}	—	October 25, 2000	Socorro	LINEAR	HYG	5.3 km	MPC · JPL
57030	2000 UW_{102}	—	October 25, 2000	Socorro	LINEAR	·	6.6 km	MPC · JPL
57031	2000 VA	—	November 1, 2000	Fountain Hills	C. W. Juels	·	2.8 km	MPC · JPL
57032	2000 VU_{8}	—	November 1, 2000	Socorro	LINEAR	·	7.3 km	MPC · JPL
57033	2000 VR_{15}	—	November 1, 2000	Socorro	LINEAR	·	5.1 km	MPC · JPL
57034	2000 VZ_{56}	—	November 3, 2000	Socorro	LINEAR	URS	12 km	MPC · JPL
57035	2000 WG_{54}	—	November 20, 2000	Socorro	LINEAR	·	3.6 km	MPC · JPL
57036	2000 WV_{182}	—	November 18, 2000	Socorro	LINEAR	PHO	3.8 km	MPC · JPL
57037	2000 YC_{105}	—	December 28, 2000	Socorro	LINEAR	·	3.2 km	MPC · JPL
57038	2001 AX_{39}	—	January 3, 2001	Anderson Mesa	LONEOS	·	3.0 km	MPC · JPL
57039	2001 DF_{61}	—	February 19, 2001	Socorro	LINEAR	·	6.4 km	MPC · JPL
57040	2001 DH_{106}	—	February 22, 2001	Socorro	LINEAR	·	1.5 km	MPC · JPL
57041	2001 EN_{12}	—	March 4, 2001	Socorro	LINEAR	L4	22 km	MPC · JPL
57042	2001 EK_{20}	—	March 15, 2001	Anderson Mesa	LONEOS	·	1.2 km	MPC · JPL
57043	2001 FS_{13}	—	March 19, 2001	Anderson Mesa	LONEOS	MAS	2.1 km	MPC · JPL
57044	2001 HH_{42}	—	April 16, 2001	Anderson Mesa	LONEOS	·	6.0 km	MPC · JPL
57045	2001 KY_{33}	—	May 18, 2001	Socorro	LINEAR	·	3.9 km	MPC · JPL
57046	2001 KW_{55}	—	May 22, 2001	Socorro	LINEAR	DOR	6.2 km	MPC · JPL
57047	2001 LG_{1}	—	June 13, 2001	Socorro	LINEAR	·	3.2 km	MPC · JPL
57048	2001 LU_{6}	—	June 15, 2001	Palomar	NEAT	slow	4.5 km	MPC · JPL
57049	2001 LJ_{7}	—	June 15, 2001	Socorro	LINEAR	·	7.4 km	MPC · JPL
57050	2001 LF_{11}	—	June 15, 2001	Socorro	LINEAR	·	6.9 km	MPC · JPL
57051	2001 LK_{13}	—	June 15, 2001	Socorro	LINEAR	PHO	3.4 km	MPC · JPL
57052	2001 MS_{6}	—	June 22, 2001	Palomar	NEAT	·	2.8 km	MPC · JPL
57053	2001 MA_{13}	—	June 23, 2001	Palomar	NEAT	·	4.9 km	MPC · JPL
57054	2001 MB_{13}	—	June 23, 2001	Palomar	NEAT	EUN	3.0 km	MPC · JPL
57055	2001 MN_{18}	—	June 26, 2001	Palomar	NEAT	·	2.7 km	MPC · JPL
57056	2001 MW_{19}	—	June 25, 2001	Palomar	NEAT	·	3.4 km	MPC · JPL
57057	2001 MO_{20}	—	June 25, 2001	Palomar	NEAT	NYS	3.6 km	MPC · JPL
57058	2001 MX_{20}	—	June 25, 2001	Palomar	NEAT	·	4.2 km	MPC · JPL
57059	2001 MA_{24}	—	June 27, 2001	Haleakala	NEAT	·	2.6 km	MPC · JPL
57060	2001 MO_{25}	—	June 17, 2001	Palomar	NEAT	·	2.0 km	MPC · JPL
57061	2001 MZ_{26}	—	June 19, 2001	Haleakala	NEAT	WAT	6.2 km	MPC · JPL
57062	2001 NC_{1}	—	July 12, 2001	Palomar	NEAT	·	1.8 km	MPC · JPL
57063	2001 NE_{3}	—	July 13, 2001	Palomar	NEAT	·	3.5 km	MPC · JPL
57064	2001 NW_{6}	—	July 14, 2001	Palomar	NEAT	·	1.9 km	MPC · JPL
57065	2001 NZ_{6}	—	July 14, 2001	Palomar	NEAT	·	5.1 km	MPC · JPL
57066	2001 NS_{8}	—	July 14, 2001	Palomar	NEAT	·	1.5 km	MPC · JPL
57067	2001 NB_{21}	—	July 14, 2001	Palomar	NEAT	·	1.7 km	MPC · JPL
57068	2001 OC_{1}	—	July 17, 2001	Haleakala	NEAT	NYS ·	3.0 km	MPC · JPL
57069	2001 OA_{3}	—	July 19, 2001	Reedy Creek	J. Broughton	·	3.2 km	MPC · JPL
57070	2001 OB_{6}	—	July 17, 2001	Anderson Mesa	LONEOS	EOS	5.8 km	MPC · JPL
57071	2001 OA_{7}	—	July 17, 2001	Anderson Mesa	LONEOS	·	2.9 km	MPC · JPL
57072	2001 OZ_{10}	—	July 20, 2001	Palomar	NEAT	·	4.3 km	MPC · JPL
57073	2001 OB_{13}	—	July 21, 2001	Reedy Creek	J. Broughton	·	5.1 km	MPC · JPL
57074	2001 OO_{13}	—	July 20, 2001	Socorro	LINEAR	·	3.2 km	MPC · JPL
57075	2001 OU_{13}	—	July 20, 2001	Socorro	LINEAR	·	2.8 km	MPC · JPL
57076 Mariocambi	2001 OY_{16}	Mariocambi	July 22, 2001	San Marcello	A. Boattini, M. Tombelli	·	3.8 km	MPC · JPL
57077	2001 OB_{19}	—	July 17, 2001	Haleakala	NEAT	·	3.0 km	MPC · JPL
57078	2001 OJ_{19}	—	July 17, 2001	Haleakala	NEAT	·	4.6 km	MPC · JPL
57079	2001 OY_{20}	—	July 21, 2001	Anderson Mesa	LONEOS	EUN	4.9 km	MPC · JPL
57080	2001 OE_{21}	—	July 21, 2001	Anderson Mesa	LONEOS	V	2.2 km	MPC · JPL
57081	2001 OH_{21}	—	July 21, 2001	Anderson Mesa	LONEOS	·	2.0 km	MPC · JPL
57082	2001 OX_{21}	—	July 21, 2001	Anderson Mesa	LONEOS	·	3.2 km	MPC · JPL
57083	2001 OM_{31}	—	July 19, 2001	Palomar	NEAT	PHO	5.5 km	MPC · JPL
57084	2001 OH_{35}	—	July 20, 2001	Palomar	NEAT	PHO	2.4 km	MPC · JPL
57085	2001 OY_{37}	—	July 20, 2001	Palomar	NEAT	H	2.1 km	MPC · JPL
57086	2001 OJ_{39}	—	July 20, 2001	Palomar	NEAT	RAF	3.3 km	MPC · JPL
57087	2001 OB_{41}	—	July 21, 2001	Palomar	NEAT	·	2.8 km	MPC · JPL
57088	2001 OT_{41}	—	July 21, 2001	Haleakala	NEAT	·	3.1 km	MPC · JPL
57089	2001 OF_{42}	—	July 22, 2001	Palomar	NEAT	EOS	8.0 km	MPC · JPL
57090	2001 OF_{44}	—	July 23, 2001	Palomar	NEAT	·	8.4 km	MPC · JPL
57091	2001 OL_{44}	—	July 23, 2001	Palomar	NEAT	·	3.4 km	MPC · JPL
57092	2001 OG_{45}	—	July 16, 2001	Anderson Mesa	LONEOS	·	3.1 km	MPC · JPL
57093	2001 OM_{46}	—	July 16, 2001	Anderson Mesa	LONEOS	(2076)	2.0 km	MPC · JPL
57094	2001 OA_{48}	—	July 16, 2001	Haleakala	NEAT	·	1.8 km	MPC · JPL
57095	2001 OX_{48}	—	July 16, 2001	Haleakala	NEAT	·	2.7 km	MPC · JPL
57096	2001 OQ_{56}	—	July 26, 2001	Palomar	NEAT	·	4.3 km	MPC · JPL
57097	2001 OP_{58}	—	July 20, 2001	Palomar	NEAT	NYS ·	4.0 km	MPC · JPL
57098	2001 OB_{66}	—	July 22, 2001	Socorro	LINEAR	·	8.6 km	MPC · JPL
57099	2001 OL_{69}	—	July 19, 2001	Anderson Mesa	LONEOS	·	1.6 km	MPC · JPL
57100	2001 OM_{69}	—	July 19, 2001	Anderson Mesa	LONEOS	·	7.4 km	MPC · JPL

== 57101–57200 ==
back to top

Designation			Discovery			Properties		Ref
Permanent	Provisional	Named after	Date	Site	Discoverer(s)	Category	Diam.	Ref
57101	2001 OC_{70}	—	July 19, 2001	Anderson Mesa	LONEOS	·	3.8 km	MPC · JPL
57102	2001 OJ_{71}	—	July 20, 2001	Palomar	NEAT	V	1.6 km	MPC · JPL
57103	2001 OF_{72}	—	July 21, 2001	Anderson Mesa	LONEOS	·	2.4 km	MPC · JPL
57104	2001 OH_{72}	—	July 21, 2001	Anderson Mesa	LONEOS	V	3.7 km	MPC · JPL
57105	2001 OJ_{72}	—	July 21, 2001	Anderson Mesa	LONEOS	·	1.8 km	MPC · JPL
57106	2001 OQ_{73}	—	July 21, 2001	Kitt Peak	Spacewatch	·	2.9 km	MPC · JPL
57107	2001 OF_{74}	—	July 16, 2001	Haleakala	NEAT	slow	2.4 km	MPC · JPL
57108	2001 OS_{74}	—	July 29, 2001	Socorro	LINEAR	·	22 km	MPC · JPL
57109	2001 OW_{74}	—	July 29, 2001	Socorro	LINEAR	H	1.5 km	MPC · JPL
57110	2001 OV_{79}	—	July 29, 2001	Palomar	NEAT	·	6.1 km	MPC · JPL
57111	2001 OQ_{80}	—	July 29, 2001	Socorro	LINEAR	·	5.4 km	MPC · JPL
57112	2001 OC_{81}	—	July 29, 2001	Socorro	LINEAR	GEF	5.0 km	MPC · JPL
57113	2001 OY_{83}	—	July 30, 2001	Palomar	NEAT	·	1.7 km	MPC · JPL
57114	2001 OY_{85}	—	July 21, 2001	Anderson Mesa	LONEOS	(5)	3.0 km	MPC · JPL
57115	2001 OS_{87}	—	July 30, 2001	Palomar	NEAT	·	9.1 km	MPC · JPL
57116	2001 OW_{92}	—	July 22, 2001	Socorro	LINEAR	H	1.2 km	MPC · JPL
57117	2001 OU_{93}	—	July 26, 2001	Palomar	NEAT	·	1.6 km	MPC · JPL
57118	2001 OF_{95}	—	July 29, 2001	Palomar	NEAT	PHO	2.5 km	MPC · JPL
57119	2001 OJ_{97}	—	July 25, 2001	Haleakala	NEAT	V	1.5 km	MPC · JPL
57120	2001 OX_{97}	—	July 25, 2001	Haleakala	NEAT	·	10 km	MPC · JPL
57121	2001 OK_{98}	—	July 25, 2001	Haleakala	NEAT	·	2.9 km	MPC · JPL
57122	2001 OS_{99}	—	July 27, 2001	Anderson Mesa	LONEOS	NYS ·	3.5 km	MPC · JPL
57123	2001 OV_{100}	—	July 27, 2001	Anderson Mesa	LONEOS	·	2.9 km	MPC · JPL
57124	2001 OJ_{101}	—	July 27, 2001	Haleakala	NEAT	THM	10 km	MPC · JPL
57125	2001 OA_{103}	—	July 29, 2001	Anderson Mesa	LONEOS	·	7.2 km	MPC · JPL
57126	2001 OM_{106}	—	July 29, 2001	Socorro	LINEAR	·	2.2 km	MPC · JPL
57127	2001 OV_{106}	—	July 29, 2001	Socorro	LINEAR	·	2.1 km	MPC · JPL
57128	2001 PG	—	August 3, 2001	Haleakala	NEAT	·	5.1 km	MPC · JPL
57129	2001 PO	—	August 5, 2001	Haleakala	NEAT	HNS	3.5 km	MPC · JPL
57130	2001 PE_{5}	—	August 9, 2001	Palomar	NEAT	·	5.9 km	MPC · JPL
57131	2001 PF_{6}	—	August 10, 2001	Haleakala	NEAT	·	4.2 km	MPC · JPL
57132	2001 PO_{6}	—	August 10, 2001	Haleakala	NEAT	·	6.5 km	MPC · JPL
57133	2001 PV_{6}	—	August 10, 2001	Haleakala	NEAT	AGN	2.9 km	MPC · JPL
57134	2001 PX_{6}	—	August 10, 2001	Haleakala	NEAT	·	3.7 km	MPC · JPL
57135	2001 PB_{7}	—	August 10, 2001	Haleakala	NEAT	·	2.1 km	MPC · JPL
57136	2001 PE_{23}	—	August 10, 2001	Haleakala	NEAT	·	4.7 km	MPC · JPL
57137	2001 PH_{23}	—	August 11, 2001	Palomar	NEAT	·	2.3 km	MPC · JPL
57138	2001 PU_{25}	—	August 11, 2001	Haleakala	NEAT	·	4.0 km	MPC · JPL
57139	2001 PU_{26}	—	August 11, 2001	Haleakala	NEAT	WIT ·	3.4 km	MPC · JPL
57140 Gaddi	2001 PG_{29}	Gaddi	August 15, 2001	San Marcello	L. Tesi, A. Boattini	NYS	1.7 km	MPC · JPL
57141	2001 PG_{32}	—	August 10, 2001	Palomar	NEAT	·	1.8 km	MPC · JPL
57142	2001 PO_{35}	—	August 11, 2001	Palomar	NEAT	·	2.3 km	MPC · JPL
57143	2001 PC_{37}	—	August 11, 2001	Palomar	NEAT	·	5.1 km	MPC · JPL
57144	2001 PJ_{43}	—	August 13, 2001	Haleakala	NEAT	V	1.6 km	MPC · JPL
57145	2001 PV_{43}	—	August 14, 2001	Haleakala	NEAT	·	1.5 km	MPC · JPL
57146	2001 PC_{46}	—	August 12, 2001	Palomar	NEAT	·	4.5 km	MPC · JPL
57147	2001 PB_{49}	—	August 14, 2001	Palomar	NEAT	·	1.7 km	MPC · JPL
57148	2001 PX_{57}	—	August 14, 2001	Haleakala	NEAT	·	1.7 km	MPC · JPL
57149	2001 PF_{59}	—	August 14, 2001	Haleakala	NEAT	slow	10 km	MPC · JPL
57150	2001 QA_{1}	—	August 16, 2001	Socorro	LINEAR	fast	2.7 km	MPC · JPL
57151	2001 QY_{1}	—	August 16, 2001	Socorro	LINEAR	(5)	4.0 km	MPC · JPL
57152	2001 QL_{2}	—	August 17, 2001	Reedy Creek	J. Broughton	·	12 km	MPC · JPL
57153	2001 QB_{4}	—	August 16, 2001	Socorro	LINEAR	ERI	5.8 km	MPC · JPL
57154	2001 QL_{7}	—	August 16, 2001	Socorro	LINEAR	·	1.9 km	MPC · JPL
57155	2001 QM_{8}	—	August 16, 2001	Socorro	LINEAR	·	3.2 km	MPC · JPL
57156	2001 QM_{10}	—	August 16, 2001	Socorro	LINEAR	NYS	2.0 km	MPC · JPL
57157	2001 QW_{11}	—	August 16, 2001	Socorro	LINEAR	·	2.9 km	MPC · JPL
57158	2001 QF_{14}	—	August 16, 2001	Socorro	LINEAR	·	2.0 km	MPC · JPL
57159	2001 QM_{15}	—	August 16, 2001	Socorro	LINEAR	·	2.2 km	MPC · JPL
57160	2001 QW_{15}	—	August 16, 2001	Socorro	LINEAR	(5)	3.6 km	MPC · JPL
57161	2001 QX_{15}	—	August 16, 2001	Socorro	LINEAR	·	5.3 km	MPC · JPL
57162	2001 QM_{16}	—	August 16, 2001	Socorro	LINEAR	·	3.0 km	MPC · JPL
57163	2001 QL_{17}	—	August 16, 2001	Socorro	LINEAR	·	2.4 km	MPC · JPL
57164	2001 QO_{17}	—	August 16, 2001	Socorro	LINEAR	RAF	2.7 km	MPC · JPL
57165	2001 QK_{18}	—	August 16, 2001	Socorro	LINEAR	·	1.9 km	MPC · JPL
57166	2001 QN_{18}	—	August 16, 2001	Socorro	LINEAR	·	2.1 km	MPC · JPL
57167	2001 QV_{18}	—	August 16, 2001	Socorro	LINEAR	·	3.3 km	MPC · JPL
57168	2001 QE_{19}	—	August 16, 2001	Socorro	LINEAR	·	1.3 km	MPC · JPL
57169	2001 QN_{19}	—	August 16, 2001	Socorro	LINEAR	·	4.5 km	MPC · JPL
57170	2001 QB_{20}	—	August 16, 2001	Socorro	LINEAR	·	3.0 km	MPC · JPL
57171	2001 QT_{20}	—	August 16, 2001	Socorro	LINEAR	·	2.4 km	MPC · JPL
57172	2001 QY_{20}	—	August 16, 2001	Socorro	LINEAR	·	3.9 km	MPC · JPL
57173	2001 QE_{22}	—	August 16, 2001	Socorro	LINEAR	EUN	3.4 km	MPC · JPL
57174	2001 QZ_{22}	—	August 16, 2001	Socorro	LINEAR	·	5.0 km	MPC · JPL
57175	2001 QD_{24}	—	August 16, 2001	Socorro	LINEAR	NYS	1.9 km	MPC · JPL
57176	2001 QP_{24}	—	August 16, 2001	Socorro	LINEAR	·	6.1 km	MPC · JPL
57177	2001 QV_{24}	—	August 16, 2001	Socorro	LINEAR	·	1.7 km	MPC · JPL
57178	2001 QC_{25}	—	August 16, 2001	Socorro	LINEAR	·	4.8 km	MPC · JPL
57179	2001 QW_{25}	—	August 16, 2001	Socorro	LINEAR	·	4.6 km	MPC · JPL
57180	2001 QK_{27}	—	August 16, 2001	Socorro	LINEAR	EUN	3.2 km	MPC · JPL
57181	2001 QU_{28}	—	August 16, 2001	Socorro	LINEAR	·	2.9 km	MPC · JPL
57182	2001 QA_{29}	—	August 16, 2001	Socorro	LINEAR	·	6.8 km	MPC · JPL
57183	2001 QG_{29}	—	August 16, 2001	Socorro	LINEAR	·	7.1 km	MPC · JPL
57184	2001 QP_{29}	—	August 16, 2001	Socorro	LINEAR	·	6.1 km	MPC · JPL
57185	2001 QB_{30}	—	August 16, 2001	Socorro	LINEAR	·	6.6 km	MPC · JPL
57186	2001 QK_{30}	—	August 16, 2001	Socorro	LINEAR	V	2.4 km	MPC · JPL
57187	2001 QP_{30}	—	August 16, 2001	Socorro	LINEAR	(12739)	3.5 km	MPC · JPL
57188	2001 QW_{30}	—	August 16, 2001	Socorro	LINEAR	·	5.0 km	MPC · JPL
57189	2001 QX_{30}	—	August 16, 2001	Socorro	LINEAR	MRX	3.7 km	MPC · JPL
57190	2001 QM_{31}	—	August 16, 2001	Socorro	LINEAR	·	4.3 km	MPC · JPL
57191	2001 QY_{31}	—	August 16, 2001	Socorro	LINEAR	·	7.8 km	MPC · JPL
57192	2001 QO_{33}	—	August 16, 2001	Socorro	LINEAR	·	1.8 km	MPC · JPL
57193	2001 QF_{34}	—	August 19, 2001	Reedy Creek	J. Broughton	·	2.4 km	MPC · JPL
57194	2001 QP_{34}	—	August 16, 2001	Socorro	LINEAR	·	2.5 km	MPC · JPL
57195	2001 QV_{40}	—	August 16, 2001	Socorro	LINEAR	·	3.1 km	MPC · JPL
57196	2001 QS_{42}	—	August 16, 2001	Socorro	LINEAR	·	2.6 km	MPC · JPL
57197	2001 QL_{44}	—	August 16, 2001	Socorro	LINEAR	·	4.6 km	MPC · JPL
57198	2001 QO_{46}	—	August 16, 2001	Socorro	LINEAR	·	7.8 km	MPC · JPL
57199	2001 QS_{47}	—	August 16, 2001	Socorro	LINEAR	·	3.6 km	MPC · JPL
57200	2001 QS_{51}	—	August 16, 2001	Socorro	LINEAR	·	3.5 km	MPC · JPL

== 57201–57300 ==
back to top

Designation			Discovery			Properties		Ref
Permanent	Provisional	Named after	Date	Site	Discoverer(s)	Category	Diam.	Ref
57201	2001 QL_{52}	—	August 16, 2001	Socorro	LINEAR	·	3.1 km	MPC · JPL
57202	2001 QJ_{53}	—	August 16, 2001	Socorro	LINEAR	·	2.8 km	MPC · JPL
57203	2001 QC_{54}	—	August 16, 2001	Socorro	LINEAR	·	2.5 km	MPC · JPL
57204	2001 QD_{54}	—	August 16, 2001	Socorro	LINEAR	·	5.1 km	MPC · JPL
57205	2001 QM_{55}	—	August 16, 2001	Socorro	LINEAR	V	1.4 km	MPC · JPL
57206	2001 QS_{56}	—	August 16, 2001	Socorro	LINEAR	·	1.6 km	MPC · JPL
57207	2001 QY_{56}	—	August 16, 2001	Socorro	LINEAR	·	1.6 km	MPC · JPL
57208	2001 QB_{57}	—	August 16, 2001	Socorro	LINEAR	AEO	4.8 km	MPC · JPL
57209	2001 QV_{58}	—	August 17, 2001	Socorro	LINEAR	·	6.5 km	MPC · JPL
57210	2001 QK_{59}	—	August 17, 2001	Socorro	LINEAR	V	1.8 km	MPC · JPL
57211	2001 QL_{60}	—	August 18, 2001	Socorro	LINEAR	·	2.3 km	MPC · JPL
57212	2001 QM_{60}	—	August 18, 2001	Socorro	LINEAR	·	6.1 km	MPC · JPL
57213	2001 QO_{60}	—	August 18, 2001	Socorro	LINEAR	·	1.7 km	MPC · JPL
57214	2001 QC_{63}	—	August 16, 2001	Socorro	LINEAR	·	6.8 km	MPC · JPL
57215	2001 QA_{65}	—	August 16, 2001	Socorro	LINEAR	·	1.9 km	MPC · JPL
57216	2001 QD_{65}	—	August 16, 2001	Socorro	LINEAR	·	3.4 km	MPC · JPL
57217	2001 QJ_{66}	—	August 17, 2001	Socorro	LINEAR	(2076)	2.4 km	MPC · JPL
57218	2001 QY_{69}	—	August 17, 2001	Socorro	LINEAR	·	2.7 km	MPC · JPL
57219	2001 QY_{71}	—	August 20, 2001	Oakley	Wolfe, C.	·	5.1 km	MPC · JPL
57220	2001 QG_{72}	—	August 21, 2001	Desert Eagle	W. K. Y. Yeung	·	6.6 km	MPC · JPL
57221	2001 QN_{74}	—	August 16, 2001	Socorro	LINEAR	·	2.9 km	MPC · JPL
57222	2001 QW_{74}	—	August 16, 2001	Socorro	LINEAR	·	2.3 km	MPC · JPL
57223	2001 QZ_{74}	—	August 16, 2001	Socorro	LINEAR	·	9.6 km	MPC · JPL
57224	2001 QF_{75}	—	August 16, 2001	Socorro	LINEAR	PHO	2.5 km	MPC · JPL
57225	2001 QG_{75}	—	August 16, 2001	Socorro	LINEAR	·	3.6 km	MPC · JPL
57226	2001 QN_{75}	—	August 16, 2001	Socorro	LINEAR	·	4.8 km	MPC · JPL
57227	2001 QR_{75}	—	August 16, 2001	Socorro	LINEAR	(7744)	5.0 km	MPC · JPL
57228	2001 QY_{75}	—	August 16, 2001	Socorro	LINEAR	EUN	4.7 km	MPC · JPL
57229	2001 QF_{76}	—	August 16, 2001	Socorro	LINEAR	·	8.3 km	MPC · JPL
57230	2001 QK_{77}	—	August 16, 2001	Socorro	LINEAR	·	3.6 km	MPC · JPL
57231	2001 QS_{77}	—	August 16, 2001	Socorro	LINEAR	·	8.9 km	MPC · JPL
57232	2001 QD_{78}	—	August 16, 2001	Socorro	LINEAR	·	5.8 km	MPC · JPL
57233	2001 QU_{79}	—	August 16, 2001	Socorro	LINEAR	·	4.2 km	MPC · JPL
57234	2001 QV_{79}	—	August 16, 2001	Socorro	LINEAR	·	3.3 km	MPC · JPL
57235	2001 QD_{80}	—	August 16, 2001	Socorro	LINEAR	·	5.2 km	MPC · JPL
57236	2001 QG_{80}	—	August 16, 2001	Socorro	LINEAR	EUN	5.5 km	MPC · JPL
57237	2001 QL_{80}	—	August 16, 2001	Socorro	LINEAR	·	5.8 km	MPC · JPL
57238	2001 QW_{80}	—	August 17, 2001	Socorro	LINEAR	·	2.0 km	MPC · JPL
57239	2001 QD_{81}	—	August 17, 2001	Socorro	LINEAR	V	1.6 km	MPC · JPL
57240	2001 QB_{83}	—	August 17, 2001	Socorro	LINEAR	·	2.6 km	MPC · JPL
57241	2001 QC_{83}	—	August 17, 2001	Socorro	LINEAR	·	1.8 km	MPC · JPL
57242	2001 QK_{83}	—	August 17, 2001	Socorro	LINEAR	EUN	3.1 km	MPC · JPL
57243	2001 QH_{84}	—	August 17, 2001	Socorro	LINEAR	·	5.6 km	MPC · JPL
57244	2001 QK_{84}	—	August 18, 2001	Socorro	LINEAR	·	1.5 km	MPC · JPL
57245	2001 QQ_{84}	—	August 18, 2001	Socorro	LINEAR	·	6.8 km	MPC · JPL
57246	2001 QW_{84}	—	August 19, 2001	Socorro	LINEAR	(2076)	1.8 km	MPC · JPL
57247	2001 QD_{86}	—	August 18, 2001	Palomar	NEAT	·	8.2 km	MPC · JPL
57248	2001 QT_{91}	—	August 19, 2001	Socorro	LINEAR	BAR	3.0 km	MPC · JPL
57249	2001 QW_{93}	—	August 22, 2001	Socorro	LINEAR	BRA	6.3 km	MPC · JPL
57250	2001 QQ_{94}	—	August 23, 2001	Desert Eagle	W. K. Y. Yeung	·	4.4 km	MPC · JPL
57251	2001 QO_{96}	—	August 16, 2001	Socorro	LINEAR	RAF	2.4 km	MPC · JPL
57252	2001 QS_{96}	—	August 16, 2001	Socorro	LINEAR	EUN ·	6.2 km	MPC · JPL
57253	2001 QT_{99}	—	August 19, 2001	Socorro	LINEAR	EUP	10 km	MPC · JPL
57254	2001 QO_{103}	—	August 19, 2001	Socorro	LINEAR	·	3.2 km	MPC · JPL
57255	2001 QR_{103}	—	August 19, 2001	Socorro	LINEAR	·	3.8 km	MPC · JPL
57256	2001 QF_{104}	—	August 20, 2001	Socorro	LINEAR	·	3.4 km	MPC · JPL
57257	2001 QG_{104}	—	August 20, 2001	Socorro	LINEAR	·	3.1 km	MPC · JPL
57258	2001 QX_{104}	—	August 22, 2001	Socorro	LINEAR	·	3.1 km	MPC · JPL
57259	2001 QO_{105}	—	August 23, 2001	Socorro	LINEAR	·	4.5 km	MPC · JPL
57260	2001 QE_{106}	—	August 18, 2001	Anderson Mesa	LONEOS	·	5.3 km	MPC · JPL
57261	2001 QO_{106}	—	August 23, 2001	Anderson Mesa	LONEOS	V	1.2 km	MPC · JPL
57262	2001 QS_{106}	—	August 21, 2001	Socorro	LINEAR	·	3.0 km	MPC · JPL
57263	2001 QM_{109}	—	August 20, 2001	Haleakala	NEAT	·	5.8 km	MPC · JPL
57264	2001 QP_{113}	—	August 23, 2001	Desert Eagle	W. K. Y. Yeung	EOS	9.3 km	MPC · JPL
57265	2001 QR_{119}	—	August 18, 2001	Socorro	LINEAR	NYS	1.9 km	MPC · JPL
57266	2001 QM_{121}	—	August 19, 2001	Socorro	LINEAR	(883)	3.4 km	MPC · JPL
57267	2001 QE_{122}	—	August 19, 2001	Socorro	LINEAR	·	2.6 km	MPC · JPL
57268	2001 QP_{123}	—	August 19, 2001	Socorro	LINEAR	·	1.8 km	MPC · JPL
57269	2001 QJ_{131}	—	August 20, 2001	Socorro	LINEAR	HNS	3.6 km	MPC · JPL
57270	2001 QT_{134}	—	August 22, 2001	Socorro	LINEAR	GEF	2.6 km	MPC · JPL
57271	2001 QC_{137}	—	August 22, 2001	Socorro	LINEAR	EOS · slow	5.2 km	MPC · JPL
57272	2001 QE_{137}	—	August 22, 2001	Socorro	LINEAR	EUP	8.5 km	MPC · JPL
57273	2001 QR_{137}	—	August 22, 2001	Socorro	LINEAR	·	5.3 km	MPC · JPL
57274	2001 QQ_{138}	—	August 22, 2001	Socorro	LINEAR	V	1.8 km	MPC · JPL
57275	2001 QE_{139}	—	August 22, 2001	Socorro	LINEAR	·	4.3 km	MPC · JPL
57276	2001 QP_{139}	—	August 22, 2001	Socorro	LINEAR	slow	7.2 km	MPC · JPL
57277	2001 QV_{139}	—	August 22, 2001	Socorro	LINEAR	GEF	3.6 km	MPC · JPL
57278	2001 QZ_{140}	—	August 23, 2001	Socorro	LINEAR	·	3.4 km	MPC · JPL
57279	2001 QU_{147}	—	August 20, 2001	Palomar	NEAT	·	4.4 km	MPC · JPL
57280	2001 QO_{148}	—	August 20, 2001	Haleakala	NEAT	·	1.4 km	MPC · JPL
57281	2001 QP_{148}	—	August 20, 2001	Haleakala	NEAT	·	3.6 km	MPC · JPL
57282	2001 QX_{155}	—	August 23, 2001	Anderson Mesa	LONEOS	·	2.8 km	MPC · JPL
57283	2001 QZ_{156}	—	August 23, 2001	Anderson Mesa	LONEOS	(2076)	2.7 km	MPC · JPL
57284	2001 QB_{157}	—	August 23, 2001	Anderson Mesa	LONEOS	·	4.2 km	MPC · JPL
57285	2001 QR_{158}	—	August 23, 2001	Anderson Mesa	LONEOS	·	5.5 km	MPC · JPL
57286	2001 QQ_{159}	—	August 23, 2001	Anderson Mesa	LONEOS	·	2.0 km	MPC · JPL
57287	2001 QC_{163}	—	August 23, 2001	Anderson Mesa	LONEOS	·	2.7 km	MPC · JPL
57288	2001 QZ_{163}	—	August 31, 2001	Desert Eagle	W. K. Y. Yeung	·	12 km	MPC · JPL
57289	2001 QP_{165}	—	August 24, 2001	Haleakala	NEAT	V	1.5 km	MPC · JPL
57290	2001 QM_{169}	—	August 19, 2001	Anderson Mesa	LONEOS	·	13 km	MPC · JPL
57291	2001 QQ_{172}	—	August 25, 2001	Socorro	LINEAR	·	8.7 km	MPC · JPL
57292	2001 QV_{174}	—	August 21, 2001	Oakley	Wolfe, C.	·	7.6 km	MPC · JPL
57293	2001 QY_{178}	—	August 27, 2001	Palomar	NEAT	·	2.0 km	MPC · JPL
57294	2001 QC_{179}	—	August 27, 2001	Palomar	NEAT	·	4.0 km	MPC · JPL
57295	2001 QX_{181}	—	August 28, 2001	Palomar	NEAT	EOS	6.7 km	MPC · JPL
57296	2001 QE_{186}	—	August 21, 2001	Haleakala	NEAT	EUN	3.5 km	MPC · JPL
57297	2001 QB_{188}	—	August 21, 2001	Haleakala	NEAT	slow	5.8 km	MPC · JPL
57298	2001 QE_{193}	—	August 22, 2001	Socorro	LINEAR	·	3.9 km	MPC · JPL
57299	2001 QM_{194}	—	August 22, 2001	Socorro	LINEAR	·	5.0 km	MPC · JPL
57300	2001 QP_{196}	—	August 22, 2001	Kitt Peak	Spacewatch	(5)	2.3 km	MPC · JPL

== 57301–57400 ==
back to top

Designation			Discovery			Properties		Ref
Permanent	Provisional	Named after	Date	Site	Discoverer(s)	Category	Diam.	Ref
57301	2001 QY_{197}	—	August 22, 2001	Socorro	LINEAR	V	2.1 km	MPC · JPL
57302	2001 QE_{198}	—	August 22, 2001	Socorro	LINEAR	·	5.4 km	MPC · JPL
57303	2001 QL_{198}	—	August 22, 2001	Socorro	LINEAR	·	5.8 km	MPC · JPL
57304	2001 QV_{198}	—	August 22, 2001	Socorro	LINEAR	·	8.6 km	MPC · JPL
57305	2001 QJ_{199}	—	August 22, 2001	Socorro	LINEAR	EOS	6.8 km	MPC · JPL
57306	2001 QB_{200}	—	August 22, 2001	Socorro	LINEAR	·	4.3 km	MPC · JPL
57307	2001 QS_{200}	—	August 22, 2001	Socorro	LINEAR	EOS	5.0 km	MPC · JPL
57308	2001 QL_{201}	—	August 22, 2001	Kitt Peak	Spacewatch	PHO	4.3 km	MPC · JPL
57309	2001 QT_{206}	—	August 23, 2001	Anderson Mesa	LONEOS	·	2.3 km	MPC · JPL
57310	2001 QE_{211}	—	August 23, 2001	Anderson Mesa	LONEOS	·	2.4 km	MPC · JPL
57311	2001 QR_{214}	—	August 23, 2001	Anderson Mesa	LONEOS	·	2.0 km	MPC · JPL
57312	2001 QM_{216}	—	August 23, 2001	Anderson Mesa	LONEOS	·	3.0 km	MPC · JPL
57313	2001 QM_{220}	—	August 23, 2001	Kitt Peak	Spacewatch	·	1.3 km	MPC · JPL
57314	2001 QK_{226}	—	August 24, 2001	Anderson Mesa	LONEOS	·	6.6 km	MPC · JPL
57315	2001 QC_{233}	—	August 24, 2001	Socorro	LINEAR	·	2.2 km	MPC · JPL
57316	2001 QD_{233}	—	August 24, 2001	Socorro	LINEAR	·	4.8 km	MPC · JPL
57317	2001 QF_{235}	—	August 24, 2001	Socorro	LINEAR	MAS	1.8 km	MPC · JPL
57318	2001 QT_{237}	—	August 24, 2001	Socorro	LINEAR	·	1.8 km	MPC · JPL
57319	2001 QX_{237}	—	August 24, 2001	Socorro	LINEAR	EUN	2.5 km	MPC · JPL
57320	2001 QN_{239}	—	August 24, 2001	Socorro	LINEAR	NYS	2.1 km	MPC · JPL
57321	2001 QV_{239}	—	August 24, 2001	Desert Eagle	W. K. Y. Yeung	·	2.3 km	MPC · JPL
57322	2001 QX_{239}	—	August 24, 2001	Socorro	LINEAR	·	2.9 km	MPC · JPL
57323	2001 QN_{240}	—	August 24, 2001	Socorro	LINEAR	·	8.6 km	MPC · JPL
57324	2001 QX_{240}	—	August 24, 2001	Socorro	LINEAR	·	2.7 km	MPC · JPL
57325	2001 QS_{241}	—	August 24, 2001	Socorro	LINEAR	·	4.2 km	MPC · JPL
57326	2001 QY_{241}	—	August 24, 2001	Socorro	LINEAR	·	1.8 km	MPC · JPL
57327	2001 QY_{242}	—	August 24, 2001	Socorro	LINEAR	·	1.3 km	MPC · JPL
57328	2001 QC_{243}	—	August 24, 2001	Socorro	LINEAR	·	2.3 km	MPC · JPL
57329	2001 QE_{245}	—	August 24, 2001	Socorro	LINEAR	EUN	2.4 km	MPC · JPL
57330	2001 QR_{245}	—	August 24, 2001	Socorro	LINEAR	·	3.5 km	MPC · JPL
57331	2001 QU_{245}	—	August 24, 2001	Socorro	LINEAR	EUP	6.7 km	MPC · JPL
57332	2001 QL_{246}	—	August 24, 2001	Socorro	LINEAR	·	3.9 km	MPC · JPL
57333	2001 QX_{246}	—	August 24, 2001	Goodricke-Pigott	R. A. Tucker	·	6.4 km	MPC · JPL
57334	2001 QH_{252}	—	August 25, 2001	Socorro	LINEAR	·	2.8 km	MPC · JPL
57335	2001 QY_{254}	—	August 25, 2001	Anderson Mesa	LONEOS	ADE	6.2 km	MPC · JPL
57336	2001 QN_{256}	—	August 25, 2001	Socorro	LINEAR	V	1.4 km	MPC · JPL
57337	2001 QD_{257}	—	August 25, 2001	Socorro	LINEAR	V	2.1 km	MPC · JPL
57338	2001 QT_{259}	—	August 25, 2001	Socorro	LINEAR	·	3.8 km	MPC · JPL
57339	2001 QG_{260}	—	August 25, 2001	Socorro	LINEAR	·	1.8 km	MPC · JPL
57340	2001 QF_{262}	—	August 25, 2001	Socorro	LINEAR	·	2.9 km	MPC · JPL
57341	2001 QR_{263}	—	August 25, 2001	Socorro	LINEAR	·	9.5 km	MPC · JPL
57342	2001 QJ_{264}	—	August 25, 2001	Socorro	LINEAR	·	2.3 km	MPC · JPL
57343	2001 QH_{269}	—	August 20, 2001	Haleakala	NEAT	·	5.3 km	MPC · JPL
57344	2001 QN_{269}	—	August 20, 2001	Haleakala	NEAT	·	5.0 km	MPC · JPL
57345	2001 QG_{275}	—	August 19, 2001	Socorro	LINEAR	·	1.5 km	MPC · JPL
57346	2001 QV_{277}	—	August 19, 2001	Socorro	LINEAR	·	1.8 km	MPC · JPL
57347	2001 QQ_{279}	—	August 19, 2001	Socorro	LINEAR	NAE	7.9 km	MPC · JPL
57348	2001 QW_{281}	—	August 19, 2001	Anderson Mesa	LONEOS	·	7.2 km	MPC · JPL
57349	2001 QC_{282}	—	August 19, 2001	Socorro	LINEAR	EUN	3.7 km	MPC · JPL
57350	2001 QU_{285}	—	August 23, 2001	Haleakala	NEAT	·	3.8 km	MPC · JPL
57351	2001 QC_{287}	—	August 17, 2001	Socorro	LINEAR	·	2.5 km	MPC · JPL
57352	2001 QP_{287}	—	August 17, 2001	Socorro	LINEAR	V	2.1 km	MPC · JPL
57353	2001 QM_{288}	—	August 17, 2001	Palomar	NEAT	·	9.6 km	MPC · JPL
57354	2001 QB_{292}	—	August 16, 2001	Socorro	LINEAR	(5)	3.2 km	MPC · JPL
57355	2001 QJ_{292}	—	August 16, 2001	Socorro	LINEAR	·	3.5 km	MPC · JPL
57356	2001 QG_{293}	—	August 26, 2001	Socorro	LINEAR	PHO	5.6 km	MPC · JPL
57357	2001 QZ_{296}	—	August 24, 2001	Socorro	LINEAR	·	3.6 km	MPC · JPL
57358	2001 QB_{297}	—	August 24, 2001	Socorro	LINEAR	·	2.3 km	MPC · JPL
57359 Robcrawford	2001 RC	Robcrawford	September 1, 2001	Fountain Hills	C. W. Juels	HNS	5.5 km	MPC · JPL
57360	2001 RJ_{4}	—	September 8, 2001	Socorro	LINEAR	·	2.5 km	MPC · JPL
57361	2001 RE_{17}	—	September 11, 2001	Desert Eagle	W. K. Y. Yeung	·	5.5 km	MPC · JPL
57362	2001 RO_{20}	—	September 7, 2001	Socorro	LINEAR	·	2.3 km	MPC · JPL
57363	2001 RD_{25}	—	September 7, 2001	Socorro	LINEAR	·	2.0 km	MPC · JPL
57364	2001 RU_{27}	—	September 7, 2001	Socorro	LINEAR	MAS	1.5 km	MPC · JPL
57365	2001 RJ_{33}	—	September 8, 2001	Socorro	LINEAR	·	2.1 km	MPC · JPL
57366	2001 RA_{35}	—	September 8, 2001	Socorro	LINEAR	·	1.8 km	MPC · JPL
57367	2001 RM_{43}	—	September 13, 2001	Ametlla de Mar	J. Nomen	·	6.5 km	MPC · JPL
57368	2001 RP_{44}	—	September 12, 2001	Palomar	NEAT	·	10 km	MPC · JPL
57369	2001 RK_{45}	—	September 14, 2001	Palomar	NEAT	·	5.4 km	MPC · JPL
57370	2001 RO_{45}	—	September 14, 2001	Palomar	NEAT	·	5.4 km	MPC · JPL
57371	2001 RB_{48}	—	September 10, 2001	Desert Eagle	W. K. Y. Yeung	·	5.3 km	MPC · JPL
57372	2001 RK_{48}	—	September 11, 2001	Desert Eagle	W. K. Y. Yeung	·	2.0 km	MPC · JPL
57373	2001 RX_{52}	—	September 12, 2001	Socorro	LINEAR	·	2.5 km	MPC · JPL
57374	2001 RZ_{52}	—	September 12, 2001	Socorro	LINEAR	·	6.5 km	MPC · JPL
57375	2001 RK_{53}	—	September 12, 2001	Socorro	LINEAR	V	1.5 km	MPC · JPL
57376	2001 RK_{64}	—	September 10, 2001	Socorro	LINEAR	·	5.4 km	MPC · JPL
57377	2001 RS_{64}	—	September 10, 2001	Socorro	LINEAR	·	1.9 km	MPC · JPL
57378	2001 RD_{66}	—	September 10, 2001	Socorro	LINEAR	·	5.4 km	MPC · JPL
57379	2001 RS_{66}	—	September 10, 2001	Socorro	LINEAR	V	2.1 km	MPC · JPL
57380	2001 RY_{66}	—	September 10, 2001	Socorro	LINEAR	·	2.3 km	MPC · JPL
57381	2001 RL_{68}	—	September 10, 2001	Socorro	LINEAR	·	1.5 km	MPC · JPL
57382	2001 RS_{68}	—	September 10, 2001	Socorro	LINEAR	EOS	5.6 km	MPC · JPL
57383	2001 RP_{70}	—	September 10, 2001	Socorro	LINEAR	·	7.8 km	MPC · JPL
57384	2001 RR_{70}	—	September 10, 2001	Socorro	LINEAR	V	1.8 km	MPC · JPL
57385	2001 RU_{70}	—	September 10, 2001	Socorro	LINEAR	TEL	4.1 km	MPC · JPL
57386	2001 RX_{71}	—	September 10, 2001	Socorro	LINEAR	·	7.0 km	MPC · JPL
57387	2001 RG_{72}	—	September 10, 2001	Socorro	LINEAR	V	1.4 km	MPC · JPL
57388	2001 RQ_{72}	—	September 10, 2001	Socorro	LINEAR	·	5.0 km	MPC · JPL
57389	2001 RV_{75}	—	September 10, 2001	Socorro	LINEAR	NYS	2.7 km	MPC · JPL
57390	2001 RT_{76}	—	September 10, 2001	Socorro	LINEAR	·	2.6 km	MPC · JPL
57391	2001 RB_{77}	—	September 10, 2001	Socorro	LINEAR	slow	7.8 km	MPC · JPL
57392	2001 RW_{77}	—	September 10, 2001	Socorro	LINEAR	MAR	3.0 km	MPC · JPL
57393	2001 RS_{78}	—	September 10, 2001	Socorro	LINEAR	·	4.5 km	MPC · JPL
57394	2001 RD_{84}	—	September 11, 2001	Anderson Mesa	LONEOS	·	2.0 km	MPC · JPL
57395	2001 RX_{84}	—	September 11, 2001	Anderson Mesa	LONEOS	·	2.3 km	MPC · JPL
57396	2001 RS_{86}	—	September 11, 2001	Anderson Mesa	LONEOS	V	1.9 km	MPC · JPL
57397	2001 RU_{86}	—	September 11, 2001	Anderson Mesa	LONEOS	·	4.3 km	MPC · JPL
57398	2001 RN_{87}	—	September 11, 2001	Anderson Mesa	LONEOS	·	2.6 km	MPC · JPL
57399	2001 RL_{89}	—	September 11, 2001	Anderson Mesa	LONEOS	·	3.2 km	MPC · JPL
57400	2001 RR_{90}	—	September 11, 2001	Anderson Mesa	LONEOS	SUL	3.5 km	MPC · JPL

== 57401–57500 ==
back to top

Designation			Discovery			Properties		Ref
Permanent	Provisional	Named after	Date	Site	Discoverer(s)	Category	Diam.	Ref
57401	2001 RB_{93}	—	September 11, 2001	Anderson Mesa	LONEOS	·	3.5 km	MPC · JPL
57402	2001 RR_{94}	—	September 11, 2001	Anderson Mesa	LONEOS	·	3.2 km	MPC · JPL
57403	2001 RG_{95}	—	September 12, 2001	Palomar	NEAT	EUN	5.5 km	MPC · JPL
57404	2001 RG_{101}	—	September 12, 2001	Socorro	LINEAR	·	2.6 km	MPC · JPL
57405	2001 RS_{109}	—	September 12, 2001	Socorro	LINEAR	·	2.2 km	MPC · JPL
57406	2001 RT_{110}	—	September 12, 2001	Socorro	LINEAR	·	1.4 km	MPC · JPL
57407	2001 RB_{112}	—	September 12, 2001	Socorro	LINEAR	MAS	1.6 km	MPC · JPL
57408	2001 RC_{115}	—	September 12, 2001	Socorro	LINEAR	·	2.1 km	MPC · JPL
57409	2001 RT_{120}	—	September 12, 2001	Socorro	LINEAR	MAS	1.6 km	MPC · JPL
57410	2001 RD_{126}	—	September 12, 2001	Socorro	LINEAR	·	1.7 km	MPC · JPL
57411	2001 RC_{128}	—	September 12, 2001	Socorro	LINEAR	·	2.5 km	MPC · JPL
57412	2001 RP_{150}	—	September 11, 2001	Socorro	LINEAR	·	4.7 km	MPC · JPL
57413	2001 SE	—	September 16, 2001	Fountain Hills	C. W. Juels, P. R. Holvorcem	·	1.7 km	MPC · JPL
57414	2001 SJ	—	September 16, 2001	Fountain Hills	C. W. Juels, P. R. Holvorcem	RAF	3.0 km	MPC · JPL
57415	2001 SD_{1}	—	September 17, 2001	Desert Eagle	W. K. Y. Yeung	MRX	2.9 km	MPC · JPL
57416	2001 SL_{1}	—	September 17, 2001	Desert Eagle	W. K. Y. Yeung	·	4.3 km	MPC · JPL
57417	2001 ST_{1}	—	September 17, 2001	Desert Eagle	W. K. Y. Yeung	·	2.5 km	MPC · JPL
57418	2001 SE_{4}	—	September 18, 2001	Fountain Hills	C. W. Juels, P. R. Holvorcem	·	2.2 km	MPC · JPL
57419	2001 SJ_{5}	—	September 16, 2001	Socorro	LINEAR	·	2.5 km	MPC · JPL
57420	2001 SE_{7}	—	September 18, 2001	Kitt Peak	Spacewatch	·	1.5 km	MPC · JPL
57421	2001 SY_{8}	—	September 19, 2001	Fountain Hills	C. W. Juels, P. R. Holvorcem	DOR	6.4 km	MPC · JPL
57422	2001 SR_{9}	—	September 18, 2001	Desert Eagle	W. K. Y. Yeung	KOR	3.5 km	MPC · JPL
57423	2001 SW_{20}	—	September 16, 2001	Socorro	LINEAR	·	3.3 km	MPC · JPL
57424 Caelumnoctu	2001 SP_{22}	Caelumnoctu	September 16, 2001	Socorro	LINEAR	EOS	6.9 km	MPC · JPL
57425	2001 SR_{22}	—	September 16, 2001	Socorro	LINEAR	EUP	7.5 km	MPC · JPL
57426	2001 SW_{26}	—	September 16, 2001	Socorro	LINEAR	THM	5.3 km	MPC · JPL
57427	2001 SD_{28}	—	September 16, 2001	Socorro	LINEAR	·	3.7 km	MPC · JPL
57428	2001 SW_{31}	—	September 16, 2001	Socorro	LINEAR	·	5.1 km	MPC · JPL
57429	2001 SX_{33}	—	September 16, 2001	Socorro	LINEAR	AST	7.7 km	MPC · JPL
57430	2001 SJ_{38}	—	September 16, 2001	Socorro	LINEAR	NYS	2.6 km	MPC · JPL
57431	2001 SB_{39}	—	September 16, 2001	Socorro	LINEAR	KOR	3.9 km	MPC · JPL
57432	2001 SM_{40}	—	September 16, 2001	Socorro	LINEAR	·	2.3 km	MPC · JPL
57433	2001 SE_{42}	—	September 16, 2001	Socorro	LINEAR	·	2.7 km	MPC · JPL
57434	2001 SH_{46}	—	September 16, 2001	Socorro	LINEAR	NYS	2.6 km	MPC · JPL
57435	2001 SQ_{47}	—	September 16, 2001	Socorro	LINEAR	V	1.6 km	MPC · JPL
57436	2001 SA_{50}	—	September 16, 2001	Socorro	LINEAR	·	3.2 km	MPC · JPL
57437	2001 SB_{52}	—	September 16, 2001	Socorro	LINEAR	·	3.3 km	MPC · JPL
57438	2001 SM_{52}	—	September 16, 2001	Socorro	LINEAR	·	3.1 km	MPC · JPL
57439	2001 SJ_{53}	—	September 16, 2001	Socorro	LINEAR	·	3.0 km	MPC · JPL
57440	2001 SR_{53}	—	September 16, 2001	Socorro	LINEAR	·	3.3 km	MPC · JPL
57441	2001 SW_{53}	—	September 16, 2001	Socorro	LINEAR	·	2.6 km	MPC · JPL
57442	2001 SF_{54}	—	September 16, 2001	Socorro	LINEAR	SUL	6.3 km	MPC · JPL
57443	2001 SM_{54}	—	September 16, 2001	Socorro	LINEAR	·	6.4 km	MPC · JPL
57444	2001 SM_{55}	—	September 16, 2001	Socorro	LINEAR	·	5.0 km	MPC · JPL
57445	2001 SE_{56}	—	September 16, 2001	Socorro	LINEAR	·	5.9 km	MPC · JPL
57446	2001 SM_{56}	—	September 16, 2001	Socorro	LINEAR	·	5.1 km	MPC · JPL
57447	2001 SQ_{58}	—	September 17, 2001	Socorro	LINEAR	·	3.9 km	MPC · JPL
57448	2001 SV_{58}	—	September 17, 2001	Socorro	LINEAR	·	5.4 km	MPC · JPL
57449	2001 SA_{65}	—	September 17, 2001	Socorro	LINEAR	EOS	6.0 km	MPC · JPL
57450	2001 SU_{69}	—	September 17, 2001	Socorro	LINEAR	V · fast	2.5 km	MPC · JPL
57451	2001 SV_{69}	—	September 17, 2001	Socorro	LINEAR	MAR ·	3.0 km	MPC · JPL
57452	2001 SX_{69}	—	September 17, 2001	Socorro	LINEAR	·	2.7 km	MPC · JPL
57453	2001 SL_{70}	—	September 17, 2001	Socorro	LINEAR	slow?	2.1 km	MPC · JPL
57454	2001 SZ_{70}	—	September 17, 2001	Socorro	LINEAR	·	2.1 km	MPC · JPL
57455	2001 SJ_{71}	—	September 17, 2001	Socorro	LINEAR	V	1.9 km	MPC · JPL
57456	2001 SK_{71}	—	September 17, 2001	Socorro	LINEAR	·	7.0 km	MPC · JPL
57457	2001 SC_{72}	—	September 17, 2001	Socorro	LINEAR	·	7.6 km	MPC · JPL
57458	2001 SX_{73}	—	September 18, 2001	Anderson Mesa	LONEOS	·	2.7 km	MPC · JPL
57459	2001 SC_{74}	—	September 19, 2001	Anderson Mesa	LONEOS	·	2.9 km	MPC · JPL
57460	2001 SA_{75}	—	September 19, 2001	Anderson Mesa	LONEOS	·	1.9 km	MPC · JPL
57461	2001 SY_{75}	—	September 19, 2001	Anderson Mesa	LONEOS	KOR	3.6 km	MPC · JPL
57462	2001 SZ_{75}	—	September 19, 2001	Anderson Mesa	LONEOS	·	2.5 km	MPC · JPL
57463	2001 SB_{76}	—	September 19, 2001	Anderson Mesa	LONEOS	·	4.8 km	MPC · JPL
57464	2001 SY_{93}	—	September 20, 2001	Socorro	LINEAR	NYS ·	3.2 km	MPC · JPL
57465	2001 SH_{108}	—	September 20, 2001	Socorro	LINEAR	·	5.6 km	MPC · JPL
57466	2001 SU_{108}	—	September 20, 2001	Socorro	LINEAR	V	2.0 km	MPC · JPL
57467	2001 SZ_{108}	—	September 20, 2001	Socorro	LINEAR	·	4.9 km	MPC · JPL
57468	2001 SF_{111}	—	September 20, 2001	Socorro	LINEAR	EOS	5.7 km	MPC · JPL
57469	2001 SA_{115}	—	September 20, 2001	Desert Eagle	W. K. Y. Yeung	·	3.4 km	MPC · JPL
57470	2001 ST_{115}	—	September 19, 2001	Goodricke-Pigott	R. A. Tucker	·	1.7 km	MPC · JPL
57471 Mariemarsina	2001 SZ_{115}	Mariemarsina	September 22, 2001	Farpoint	G. Hug	HYG	7.7 km	MPC · JPL
57472	2001 SO_{124}	—	September 16, 2001	Socorro	LINEAR	·	3.3 km	MPC · JPL
57473	2001 SE_{127}	—	September 16, 2001	Socorro	LINEAR	SUL	4.2 km	MPC · JPL
57474	2001 SL_{129}	—	September 16, 2001	Socorro	LINEAR	V	1.4 km	MPC · JPL
57475	2001 SO_{132}	—	September 16, 2001	Socorro	LINEAR	·	1.7 km	MPC · JPL
57476	2001 SB_{134}	—	September 16, 2001	Socorro	LINEAR	·	2.5 km	MPC · JPL
57477	2001 SU_{151}	—	September 17, 2001	Socorro	LINEAR	·	4.1 km	MPC · JPL
57478	2001 SW_{151}	—	September 17, 2001	Socorro	LINEAR	V	2.0 km	MPC · JPL
57479	2001 SD_{153}	—	September 17, 2001	Socorro	LINEAR	·	1.4 km	MPC · JPL
57480	2001 SO_{153}	—	September 17, 2001	Socorro	LINEAR	KOR	3.7 km	MPC · JPL
57481	2001 ST_{153}	—	September 17, 2001	Socorro	LINEAR	(5)	4.7 km	MPC · JPL
57482	2001 SH_{154}	—	September 17, 2001	Socorro	LINEAR	·	4.8 km	MPC · JPL
57483	2001 SU_{155}	—	September 17, 2001	Socorro	LINEAR	KOR	3.2 km	MPC · JPL
57484	2001 ST_{159}	—	September 17, 2001	Socorro	LINEAR	·	1.8 km	MPC · JPL
57485	2001 SN_{161}	—	September 17, 2001	Socorro	LINEAR	·	3.9 km	MPC · JPL
57486	2001 SH_{163}	—	September 17, 2001	Socorro	LINEAR	·	2.9 km	MPC · JPL
57487	2001 SN_{163}	—	September 17, 2001	Socorro	LINEAR	·	1.9 km	MPC · JPL
57488	2001 ST_{163}	—	September 17, 2001	Socorro	LINEAR	·	3.8 km	MPC · JPL
57489	2001 SN_{173}	—	September 16, 2001	Socorro	LINEAR	·	3.2 km	MPC · JPL
57490	2001 ST_{175}	—	September 16, 2001	Socorro	LINEAR	NYS	2.0 km	MPC · JPL
57491	2001 SY_{176}	—	September 16, 2001	Socorro	LINEAR	·	2.8 km	MPC · JPL
57492	2001 SR_{179}	—	September 19, 2001	Socorro	LINEAR	·	1.7 km	MPC · JPL
57493	2001 SR_{185}	—	September 19, 2001	Socorro	LINEAR	NYS	1.9 km	MPC · JPL
57494	2001 SM_{199}	—	September 19, 2001	Socorro	LINEAR	·	2.7 km	MPC · JPL
57495	2001 SS_{211}	—	September 19, 2001	Socorro	LINEAR	·	4.0 km	MPC · JPL
57496	2001 SB_{234}	—	September 19, 2001	Socorro	LINEAR	V	1.6 km	MPC · JPL
57497	2001 SP_{235}	—	September 19, 2001	Socorro	LINEAR	NYS	2.8 km	MPC · JPL
57498	2001 SE_{239}	—	September 19, 2001	Socorro	LINEAR	·	1.9 km	MPC · JPL
57499	2001 SX_{239}	—	September 19, 2001	Socorro	LINEAR	MRX	2.8 km	MPC · JPL
57500	2001 SM_{244}	—	September 19, 2001	Socorro	LINEAR	EUN	3.5 km	MPC · JPL

== 57501–57600 ==
back to top

Designation			Discovery			Properties		Ref
Permanent	Provisional	Named after	Date	Site	Discoverer(s)	Category	Diam.	Ref
57501	2001 SE_{250}	—	September 19, 2001	Socorro	LINEAR	·	2.1 km	MPC · JPL
57502	2001 SK_{252}	—	September 19, 2001	Socorro	LINEAR	·	2.8 km	MPC · JPL
57503	2001 ST_{252}	—	September 19, 2001	Socorro	LINEAR	·	2.4 km	MPC · JPL
57504	2001 SL_{265}	—	September 25, 2001	Desert Eagle	W. K. Y. Yeung	·	2.0 km	MPC · JPL
57505	2001 SK_{266}	—	September 25, 2001	Desert Eagle	W. K. Y. Yeung	·	4.4 km	MPC · JPL
57506	2001 SK_{268}	—	September 25, 2001	Desert Eagle	W. K. Y. Yeung	·	8.7 km	MPC · JPL
57507	2001 SM_{268}	—	September 26, 2001	Desert Eagle	W. K. Y. Yeung	·	3.1 km	MPC · JPL
57508	2001 SN_{270}	—	September 27, 2001	Fountain Hills	C. W. Juels, P. R. Holvorcem	·	3.5 km	MPC · JPL
57509 Sly	2001 SY_{270}	Sly	September 16, 2001	Palomar	NEAT	·	3.7 km	MPC · JPL
57510	2001 SG_{280}	—	September 21, 2001	Anderson Mesa	LONEOS	·	3.9 km	MPC · JPL
57511	2001 ST_{280}	—	September 21, 2001	Anderson Mesa	LONEOS	KOR	3.3 km	MPC · JPL
57512	2001 SL_{281}	—	September 21, 2001	Anderson Mesa	LONEOS	·	5.0 km	MPC · JPL
57513	2001 SS_{281}	—	September 21, 2001	Anderson Mesa	LONEOS	EOS	6.6 km	MPC · JPL
57514	2001 SU_{281}	—	September 21, 2001	Anderson Mesa	LONEOS	MAR	2.6 km	MPC · JPL
57515	2001 SX_{281}	—	September 22, 2001	Anderson Mesa	LONEOS	EUP	8.6 km	MPC · JPL
57516	2001 SZ_{281}	—	September 22, 2001	Anderson Mesa	LONEOS	HNS	3.7 km	MPC · JPL
57517	2001 SV_{285}	—	September 28, 2001	Fountain Hills	C. W. Juels, P. R. Holvorcem	·	3.1 km	MPC · JPL
57518	2001 SB_{286}	—	September 28, 2001	Fountain Hills	C. W. Juels, P. R. Holvorcem	·	7.9 km	MPC · JPL
57519	2001 SV_{287}	—	September 27, 2001	Palomar	NEAT	·	5.6 km	MPC · JPL
57520	2001 SB_{289}	—	September 22, 2001	Goodricke-Pigott	R. A. Tucker	·	5.2 km	MPC · JPL
57521	2001 SD_{289}	—	September 23, 2001	Goodricke-Pigott	R. A. Tucker	·	2.3 km	MPC · JPL
57522	2001 SR_{290}	—	September 25, 2001	Goodricke-Pigott	R. A. Tucker	WAT	4.8 km	MPC · JPL
57523	2001 ST_{290}	—	September 25, 2001	Goodricke-Pigott	R. A. Tucker	·	4.7 km	MPC · JPL
57524	2001 SX_{291}	—	September 17, 2001	Anderson Mesa	LONEOS	HNS	3.6 km	MPC · JPL
57525	2001 SC_{316}	—	September 25, 2001	Socorro	LINEAR	·	5.5 km	MPC · JPL
57526	2001 SD_{316}	—	September 25, 2001	Socorro	LINEAR	·	5.0 km	MPC · JPL
57527	2001 SN_{316}	—	September 25, 2001	Socorro	LINEAR	·	6.0 km	MPC · JPL
57528	2001 SM_{343}	—	September 22, 2001	Palomar	NEAT	MAR	2.8 km	MPC · JPL
57529	2001 SX_{344}	—	September 23, 2001	Palomar	NEAT	·	7.5 km	MPC · JPL
57530	2001 SZ_{345}	—	September 23, 2001	Anderson Mesa	LONEOS	·	11 km	MPC · JPL
57531	2001 SL_{346}	—	September 25, 2001	Socorro	LINEAR	·	9.7 km	MPC · JPL
57532	2001 TA	—	October 3, 2001	Palomar	NEAT	EUN	5.3 km	MPC · JPL
57533	2001 TT_{2}	—	October 6, 2001	Palomar	NEAT	·	2.8 km	MPC · JPL
57534	2001 TP_{8}	—	October 9, 2001	Socorro	LINEAR	·	8.4 km	MPC · JPL
57535	2001 TN_{9}	—	October 13, 2001	Socorro	LINEAR	·	1.4 km	MPC · JPL
57536	2001 TA_{13}	—	October 11, 2001	Socorro	LINEAR	·	7.1 km	MPC · JPL
57537	2001 TQ_{13}	—	October 11, 2001	Goodricke-Pigott	R. A. Tucker	·	3.5 km	MPC · JPL
57538	2001 TW_{13}	—	October 12, 2001	Farpoint	G. Hug	MAR	3.1 km	MPC · JPL
57539	2001 TU_{17}	—	October 14, 2001	Desert Eagle	W. K. Y. Yeung	EUN	4.2 km	MPC · JPL
57540	2001 TE_{18}	—	October 14, 2001	Desert Eagle	W. K. Y. Yeung	KOR	4.3 km	MPC · JPL
57541	2001 TV_{18}	—	October 11, 2001	Goodricke-Pigott	R. A. Tucker	EUN	4.3 km	MPC · JPL
57542	2001 TW_{18}	—	October 15, 2001	Goodricke-Pigott	R. A. Tucker	·	4.5 km	MPC · JPL
57543	2001 TZ_{19}	—	October 9, 2001	Socorro	LINEAR	EUN	3.4 km	MPC · JPL
57544	2001 TL_{20}	—	October 9, 2001	Socorro	LINEAR	·	4.9 km	MPC · JPL
57545	2001 TG_{21}	—	October 9, 2001	Socorro	LINEAR	·	8.5 km	MPC · JPL
57546	2001 TO_{21}	—	October 11, 2001	Socorro	LINEAR	·	2.7 km	MPC · JPL
57547	2001 TV_{21}	—	October 11, 2001	Socorro	LINEAR	·	4.9 km	MPC · JPL
57548	2001 TU_{22}	—	October 13, 2001	Socorro	LINEAR	·	3.7 km	MPC · JPL
57549	2001 TE_{28}	—	October 14, 2001	Socorro	LINEAR	·	4.3 km	MPC · JPL
57550	2001 TQ_{28}	—	October 14, 2001	Socorro	LINEAR	·	4.2 km	MPC · JPL
57551	2001 TE_{29}	—	October 14, 2001	Socorro	LINEAR	·	3.8 km	MPC · JPL
57552	2001 TM_{31}	—	October 14, 2001	Socorro	LINEAR	·	4.8 km	MPC · JPL
57553	2001 TP_{34}	—	October 14, 2001	Socorro	LINEAR	·	4.0 km	MPC · JPL
57554	2001 TS_{36}	—	October 14, 2001	Socorro	LINEAR	PHO	2.8 km	MPC · JPL
57555	2001 TM_{37}	—	October 14, 2001	Socorro	LINEAR	EOS	6.1 km	MPC · JPL
57556	2001 TO_{38}	—	October 14, 2001	Socorro	LINEAR	·	6.5 km	MPC · JPL
57557	2001 TH_{39}	—	October 14, 2001	Socorro	LINEAR	·	1.7 km	MPC · JPL
57558	2001 TA_{46}	—	October 9, 2001	Kitt Peak	Spacewatch	THM	7.3 km	MPC · JPL
57559	2001 TY_{46}	—	October 15, 2001	Desert Eagle	W. K. Y. Yeung	AGN	2.9 km	MPC · JPL
57560	2001 TB_{47}	—	October 15, 2001	Desert Eagle	W. K. Y. Yeung	THM	7.1 km	MPC · JPL
57561 Gabrielegiuli	2001 TA_{48}	Gabrielegiuli	October 14, 2001	Cima Ekar	ADAS	·	1.7 km	MPC · JPL
57562	2001 TS_{48}	—	October 15, 2001	Desert Eagle	W. K. Y. Yeung	MAR	4.3 km	MPC · JPL
57563	2001 TT_{49}	—	October 11, 2001	Socorro	LINEAR	EUN · fast	2.7 km	MPC · JPL
57564	2001 TV_{49}	—	October 13, 2001	Socorro	LINEAR	·	8.8 km	MPC · JPL
57565	2001 TB_{52}	—	October 13, 2001	Socorro	LINEAR	·	6.0 km	MPC · JPL
57566	2001 TU_{54}	—	October 14, 2001	Socorro	LINEAR	·	2.4 km	MPC · JPL
57567 Crikey	2001 TS_{56}	Crikey	October 14, 2001	Needville	Needville	·	5.3 km	MPC · JPL
57568	2001 TR_{57}	—	October 13, 2001	Socorro	LINEAR	·	2.8 km	MPC · JPL
57569	2001 TE_{60}	—	October 13, 2001	Socorro	LINEAR	V	1.7 km	MPC · JPL
57570	2001 TO_{61}	—	October 13, 2001	Socorro	LINEAR	·	6.7 km	MPC · JPL
57571	2001 TR_{61}	—	October 13, 2001	Socorro	LINEAR	·	5.4 km	MPC · JPL
57572	2001 TY_{63}	—	October 13, 2001	Socorro	LINEAR	KOR	3.5 km	MPC · JPL
57573	2001 TD_{65}	—	October 13, 2001	Socorro	LINEAR	KOR	3.5 km	MPC · JPL
57574	2001 TF_{66}	—	October 13, 2001	Socorro	LINEAR	·	4.4 km	MPC · JPL
57575	2001 TT_{66}	—	October 13, 2001	Socorro	LINEAR	·	5.2 km	MPC · JPL
57576	2001 TV_{66}	—	October 13, 2001	Socorro	LINEAR	·	3.0 km	MPC · JPL
57577	2001 TY_{66}	—	October 13, 2001	Socorro	LINEAR	HOF	6.1 km	MPC · JPL
57578	2001 TC_{67}	—	October 13, 2001	Socorro	LINEAR	AGN	3.5 km	MPC · JPL
57579	2001 TD_{67}	—	October 13, 2001	Socorro	LINEAR	·	6.2 km	MPC · JPL
57580	2001 TF_{67}	—	October 13, 2001	Socorro	LINEAR	·	6.5 km	MPC · JPL
57581	2001 TH_{67}	—	October 13, 2001	Socorro	LINEAR	·	6.9 km	MPC · JPL
57582	2001 TP_{67}	—	October 13, 2001	Socorro	LINEAR	·	7.0 km	MPC · JPL
57583	2001 TZ_{67}	—	October 13, 2001	Socorro	LINEAR	·	6.9 km	MPC · JPL
57584	2001 TO_{68}	—	October 13, 2001	Socorro	LINEAR	·	3.7 km	MPC · JPL
57585	2001 TG_{70}	—	October 13, 2001	Socorro	LINEAR	·	7.0 km	MPC · JPL
57586	2001 TA_{71}	—	October 13, 2001	Socorro	LINEAR	·	3.3 km	MPC · JPL
57587	2001 TZ_{73}	—	October 13, 2001	Socorro	LINEAR	·	5.6 km	MPC · JPL
57588	2001 TB_{74}	—	October 13, 2001	Socorro	LINEAR	KOR	3.9 km	MPC · JPL
57589	2001 TH_{74}	—	October 13, 2001	Socorro	LINEAR	·	6.1 km	MPC · JPL
57590	2001 TJ_{76}	—	October 13, 2001	Socorro	LINEAR	THM	7.6 km	MPC · JPL
57591	2001 TM_{76}	—	October 13, 2001	Socorro	LINEAR	·	5.5 km	MPC · JPL
57592	2001 TB_{77}	—	October 13, 2001	Socorro	LINEAR	·	5.1 km	MPC · JPL
57593	2001 TF_{77}	—	October 13, 2001	Socorro	LINEAR	·	3.6 km	MPC · JPL
57594	2001 TQ_{78}	—	October 13, 2001	Socorro	LINEAR	·	3.7 km	MPC · JPL
57595	2001 TV_{78}	—	October 13, 2001	Socorro	LINEAR	EUN	3.8 km	MPC · JPL
57596	2001 TD_{81}	—	October 14, 2001	Socorro	LINEAR	·	4.5 km	MPC · JPL
57597	2001 TU_{88}	—	October 14, 2001	Socorro	LINEAR	·	3.9 km	MPC · JPL
57598	2001 TZ_{95}	—	October 14, 2001	Socorro	LINEAR	·	4.0 km	MPC · JPL
57599	2001 TK_{96}	—	October 14, 2001	Socorro	LINEAR	·	2.0 km	MPC · JPL
57600	2001 TM_{96}	—	October 14, 2001	Socorro	LINEAR	·	4.5 km	MPC · JPL

== 57601–57700 ==
back to top

Designation			Discovery			Properties		Ref
Permanent	Provisional	Named after	Date	Site	Discoverer(s)	Category	Diam.	Ref
57601	2001 TY_{96}	—	October 14, 2001	Socorro	LINEAR	·	6.2 km	MPC · JPL
57602	2001 TA_{102}	—	October 15, 2001	Socorro	LINEAR	·	5.6 km	MPC · JPL
57603	2001 TM_{102}	—	October 15, 2001	Socorro	LINEAR	·	3.1 km	MPC · JPL
57604	2001 TF_{105}	—	October 13, 2001	Socorro	LINEAR	EUN	3.6 km	MPC · JPL
57605	2001 TA_{106}	—	October 13, 2001	Socorro	LINEAR	·	3.6 km	MPC · JPL
57606	2001 TU_{110}	—	October 14, 2001	Socorro	LINEAR	·	6.7 km	MPC · JPL
57607	2001 TZ_{110}	—	October 14, 2001	Socorro	LINEAR	·	5.8 km	MPC · JPL
57608	2001 TY_{114}	—	October 14, 2001	Socorro	LINEAR	·	4.6 km	MPC · JPL
57609	2001 TD_{116}	—	October 14, 2001	Socorro	LINEAR	·	5.3 km	MPC · JPL
57610	2001 TK_{116}	—	October 14, 2001	Socorro	LINEAR	·	11 km	MPC · JPL
57611	2001 TM_{116}	—	October 14, 2001	Socorro	LINEAR	·	7.3 km	MPC · JPL
57612	2001 TY_{116}	—	October 14, 2001	Socorro	LINEAR	·	4.3 km	MPC · JPL
57613	2001 TC_{124}	—	October 12, 2001	Haleakala	NEAT	·	3.0 km	MPC · JPL
57614	2001 TY_{125}	—	October 12, 2001	Haleakala	NEAT	EOS	6.0 km	MPC · JPL
57615	2001 TJ_{133}	—	October 12, 2001	Haleakala	NEAT	·	2.9 km	MPC · JPL
57616	2001 TV_{137}	—	October 14, 2001	Palomar	NEAT	MAR	3.0 km	MPC · JPL
57617	2001 TV_{139}	—	October 10, 2001	Palomar	NEAT	V	1.4 km	MPC · JPL
57618	2001 TN_{142}	—	October 10, 2001	Palomar	NEAT	·	2.6 km	MPC · JPL
57619	2001 TJ_{147}	—	October 10, 2001	Palomar	NEAT	·	2.2 km	MPC · JPL
57620	2001 TV_{147}	—	October 10, 2001	Palomar	NEAT	·	3.3 km	MPC · JPL
57621	2001 TN_{151}	—	October 10, 2001	Palomar	NEAT	·	5.1 km	MPC · JPL
57622	2001 TY_{151}	—	October 10, 2001	Palomar	NEAT	HNS	2.3 km	MPC · JPL
57623	2001 TB_{153}	—	October 10, 2001	Palomar	NEAT	·	8.2 km	MPC · JPL
57624	2001 TZ_{157}	—	October 10, 2001	Palomar	NEAT	·	6.6 km	MPC · JPL
57625	2001 TJ_{158}	—	October 10, 2001	Palomar	NEAT	·	5.7 km	MPC · JPL
57626	2001 TE_{165}	—	October 15, 2001	Palomar	NEAT	L5	20 km	MPC · JPL
57627	2001 TO_{168}	—	October 15, 2001	Socorro	LINEAR	·	4.4 km	MPC · JPL
57628	2001 TR_{168}	—	October 15, 2001	Socorro	LINEAR	·	6.9 km	MPC · JPL
57629	2001 TY_{168}	—	October 15, 2001	Socorro	LINEAR	HNS	3.9 km	MPC · JPL
57630	2001 TY_{171}	—	October 14, 2001	Anderson Mesa	LONEOS	GEF	3.3 km	MPC · JPL
57631	2001 TK_{179}	—	October 14, 2001	Socorro	LINEAR	·	3.6 km	MPC · JPL
57632	2001 TB_{182}	—	October 14, 2001	Socorro	LINEAR	·	1.9 km	MPC · JPL
57633	2001 TJ_{182}	—	October 14, 2001	Socorro	LINEAR	·	9.0 km	MPC · JPL
57634	2001 TR_{182}	—	October 14, 2001	Socorro	LINEAR	·	8.3 km	MPC · JPL
57635	2001 TF_{183}	—	October 14, 2001	Socorro	LINEAR	·	3.8 km	MPC · JPL
57636	2001 TT_{187}	—	October 14, 2001	Socorro	LINEAR	EOS	4.7 km	MPC · JPL
57637	2001 TH_{189}	—	October 14, 2001	Socorro	LINEAR	·	3.7 km	MPC · JPL
57638	2001 TL_{190}	—	October 14, 2001	Socorro	LINEAR	·	2.4 km	MPC · JPL
57639	2001 TO_{190}	—	October 14, 2001	Socorro	LINEAR	·	3.2 km	MPC · JPL
57640	2001 TC_{191}	—	October 14, 2001	Socorro	LINEAR	·	3.0 km	MPC · JPL
57641	2001 TW_{191}	—	October 14, 2001	Socorro	LINEAR	HYG	5.8 km	MPC · JPL
57642	2001 TH_{196}	—	October 14, 2001	Palomar	NEAT	·	8.0 km	MPC · JPL
57643	2001 TV_{199}	—	October 11, 2001	Socorro	LINEAR	V	1.4 km	MPC · JPL
57644	2001 TV_{201}	—	October 11, 2001	Socorro	LINEAR	L5	13 km	MPC · JPL
57645	2001 TK_{202}	—	October 11, 2001	Socorro	LINEAR	·	2.9 km	MPC · JPL
57646	2001 TO_{202}	—	October 11, 2001	Socorro	LINEAR	·	8.3 km	MPC · JPL
57647	2001 TL_{203}	—	October 11, 2001	Socorro	LINEAR	EUN	3.7 km	MPC · JPL
57648	2001 TM_{203}	—	October 11, 2001	Socorro	LINEAR	·	11 km	MPC · JPL
57649	2001 TG_{210}	—	October 13, 2001	Palomar	NEAT	ADE	7.2 km	MPC · JPL
57650	2001 TH_{217}	—	October 14, 2001	Socorro	LINEAR	·	4.6 km	MPC · JPL
57651	2001 TQ_{218}	—	October 14, 2001	Anderson Mesa	LONEOS	MRX	3.0 km	MPC · JPL
57652	2001 TR_{224}	—	October 14, 2001	Palomar	NEAT	·	7.0 km	MPC · JPL
57653	2001 TE_{226}	—	October 14, 2001	Palomar	NEAT	·	3.8 km	MPC · JPL
57654	2001 TL_{226}	—	October 14, 2001	Palomar	NEAT	·	12 km	MPC · JPL
57655	2001 TU_{228}	—	October 15, 2001	Socorro	LINEAR	TIR	7.2 km	MPC · JPL
57656	2001 TG_{229}	—	October 15, 2001	Socorro	LINEAR	EUN	3.7 km	MPC · JPL
57657	2001 TF_{230}	—	October 15, 2001	Palomar	NEAT	·	2.2 km	MPC · JPL
57658 Nilrem	2001 UJ_{1}	Nilrem	October 17, 2001	Vicques	M. Ory	·	3.5 km	MPC · JPL
57659	2001 UP_{4}	—	October 18, 2001	Desert Eagle	W. K. Y. Yeung	·	5.9 km	MPC · JPL
57660	2001 UY_{6}	—	October 18, 2001	Desert Eagle	W. K. Y. Yeung	·	5.9 km	MPC · JPL
57661	2001 UQ_{12}	—	October 24, 2001	Desert Eagle	W. K. Y. Yeung	EOS	3.7 km	MPC · JPL
57662	2001 UJ_{13}	—	October 24, 2001	Desert Eagle	W. K. Y. Yeung	KOR	3.5 km	MPC · JPL
57663	2001 UA_{15}	—	October 24, 2001	Desert Eagle	W. K. Y. Yeung	EOS	4.5 km	MPC · JPL
57664	2001 UY_{17}	—	October 26, 2001	Socorro	LINEAR	·	15 km	MPC · JPL
57665	2001 UL_{24}	—	October 18, 2001	Socorro	LINEAR	EOS	4.8 km	MPC · JPL
57666	2001 UW_{24}	—	October 18, 2001	Socorro	LINEAR	·	6.1 km	MPC · JPL
57667	2001 UN_{25}	—	October 18, 2001	Socorro	LINEAR	GEF	2.9 km	MPC · JPL
57668	2001 UM_{27}	—	October 18, 2001	Palomar	NEAT	·	2.5 km	MPC · JPL
57669	2001 UO_{29}	—	October 16, 2001	Socorro	LINEAR	·	4.4 km	MPC · JPL
57670	2001 UB_{30}	—	October 16, 2001	Socorro	LINEAR	·	7.4 km	MPC · JPL
57671	2001 UN_{31}	—	October 16, 2001	Socorro	LINEAR	·	7.7 km	MPC · JPL
57672	2001 UA_{33}	—	October 16, 2001	Socorro	LINEAR	·	6.7 km	MPC · JPL
57673	2001 UY_{33}	—	October 16, 2001	Socorro	LINEAR	EUN	3.9 km	MPC · JPL
57674	2001 UD_{35}	—	October 16, 2001	Socorro	LINEAR	·	9.4 km	MPC · JPL
57675	2001 UG_{36}	—	October 16, 2001	Socorro	LINEAR	·	4.6 km	MPC · JPL
57676	2001 UR_{36}	—	October 16, 2001	Socorro	LINEAR	·	3.5 km	MPC · JPL
57677	2001 UT_{41}	—	October 17, 2001	Socorro	LINEAR	·	3.3 km	MPC · JPL
57678	2001 UL_{44}	—	October 17, 2001	Socorro	LINEAR	·	5.0 km	MPC · JPL
57679	2001 UD_{46}	—	October 17, 2001	Socorro	LINEAR	fast	3.0 km	MPC · JPL
57680	2001 UW_{47}	—	October 17, 2001	Socorro	LINEAR	HOF	3.8 km	MPC · JPL
57681	2001 UJ_{48}	—	October 17, 2001	Socorro	LINEAR	KOR	3.3 km	MPC · JPL
57682	2001 UO_{48}	—	October 17, 2001	Socorro	LINEAR	MAR	3.8 km	MPC · JPL
57683	2001 UK_{53}	—	October 17, 2001	Socorro	LINEAR	·	7.5 km	MPC · JPL
57684	2001 UG_{58}	—	October 17, 2001	Socorro	LINEAR	NYS	2.8 km	MPC · JPL
57685	2001 UK_{58}	—	October 17, 2001	Socorro	LINEAR	·	4.3 km	MPC · JPL
57686	2001 UL_{65}	—	October 18, 2001	Socorro	LINEAR	·	3.9 km	MPC · JPL
57687	2001 UL_{66}	—	October 18, 2001	Socorro	LINEAR	EOS	6.3 km	MPC · JPL
57688	2001 UH_{73}	—	October 17, 2001	Socorro	LINEAR	·	5.0 km	MPC · JPL
57689	2001 UM_{73}	—	October 17, 2001	Socorro	LINEAR	·	3.0 km	MPC · JPL
57690	2001 UA_{74}	—	October 17, 2001	Socorro	LINEAR	·	4.4 km	MPC · JPL
57691	2001 UH_{74}	—	October 17, 2001	Socorro	LINEAR	THM	7.3 km	MPC · JPL
57692	2001 UG_{75}	—	October 17, 2001	Socorro	LINEAR	NYS	1.6 km	MPC · JPL
57693	2001 UD_{76}	—	October 17, 2001	Socorro	LINEAR	THM	6.4 km	MPC · JPL
57694	2001 UU_{76}	—	October 17, 2001	Socorro	LINEAR	·	3.8 km	MPC · JPL
57695	2001 UK_{77}	—	October 17, 2001	Socorro	LINEAR	·	4.3 km	MPC · JPL
57696	2001 UH_{83}	—	October 20, 2001	Socorro	LINEAR	·	4.2 km	MPC · JPL
57697	2001 UJ_{83}	—	October 20, 2001	Socorro	LINEAR	·	2.7 km	MPC · JPL
57698	2001 UC_{86}	—	October 16, 2001	Kitt Peak	Spacewatch	·	2.2 km	MPC · JPL
57699	2001 US_{88}	—	October 16, 2001	Palomar	NEAT	·	2.0 km	MPC · JPL
57700	2001 US_{93}	—	October 19, 2001	Haleakala	NEAT	EOS	4.0 km	MPC · JPL

== 57701–57800 ==
back to top

Designation			Discovery			Properties		Ref
Permanent	Provisional	Named after	Date	Site	Discoverer(s)	Category	Diam.	Ref
57701	2001 UT_{94}	—	October 19, 2001	Haleakala	NEAT	·	4.6 km	MPC · JPL
57702	2001 UV_{98}	—	October 17, 2001	Socorro	LINEAR	(5)	3.2 km	MPC · JPL
57703	2001 UB_{109}	—	October 20, 2001	Socorro	LINEAR	KOR	3.2 km	MPC · JPL
57704	2001 UV_{114}	—	October 22, 2001	Socorro	LINEAR	THM	5.5 km	MPC · JPL
57705	2001 UA_{115}	—	October 22, 2001	Socorro	LINEAR	V	1.5 km	MPC · JPL
57706	2001 UJ_{116}	—	October 22, 2001	Socorro	LINEAR	·	3.3 km	MPC · JPL
57707	2001 UG_{118}	—	October 22, 2001	Socorro	LINEAR	KOR	2.8 km	MPC · JPL
57708	2001 UV_{119}	—	October 22, 2001	Socorro	LINEAR	THM	6.7 km	MPC · JPL
57709	2001 UW_{119}	—	October 22, 2001	Socorro	LINEAR	·	5.2 km	MPC · JPL
57710	2001 UZ_{120}	—	October 22, 2001	Socorro	LINEAR	·	2.6 km	MPC · JPL
57711	2001 UV_{121}	—	October 22, 2001	Socorro	LINEAR	·	5.6 km	MPC · JPL
57712	2001 UJ_{123}	—	October 22, 2001	Socorro	LINEAR	·	3.4 km	MPC · JPL
57713	2001 UN_{124}	—	October 22, 2001	Palomar	NEAT	EOS	4.5 km	MPC · JPL
57714	2001 UY_{124}	—	October 22, 2001	Palomar	NEAT	L5	28 km	MPC · JPL
57715	2001 UR_{125}	—	October 22, 2001	Palomar	NEAT	·	5.1 km	MPC · JPL
57716	2001 UY_{126}	—	October 17, 2001	Socorro	LINEAR	HYG	6.4 km	MPC · JPL
57717	2001 UE_{127}	—	October 17, 2001	Socorro	LINEAR	·	3.2 km	MPC · JPL
57718	2001 UJ_{127}	—	October 17, 2001	Socorro	LINEAR	·	4.6 km	MPC · JPL
57719	2001 UE_{132}	—	October 20, 2001	Socorro	LINEAR	THM	6.4 km	MPC · JPL
57720	2001 UM_{134}	—	October 21, 2001	Socorro	LINEAR	MRX	2.7 km	MPC · JPL
57721	2001 UK_{139}	—	October 23, 2001	Socorro	LINEAR	NYS	2.0 km	MPC · JPL
57722	2001 UG_{142}	—	October 23, 2001	Socorro	LINEAR	·	4.4 km	MPC · JPL
57723	2001 UO_{146}	—	October 23, 2001	Socorro	LINEAR	·	3.7 km	MPC · JPL
57724	2001 UT_{148}	—	October 23, 2001	Socorro	LINEAR	·	3.3 km	MPC · JPL
57725	2001 UN_{149}	—	October 23, 2001	Socorro	LINEAR	KOR	3.4 km	MPC · JPL
57726	2001 UV_{149}	—	October 23, 2001	Socorro	LINEAR	·	2.5 km	MPC · JPL
57727	2001 UX_{149}	—	October 23, 2001	Socorro	LINEAR	·	6.1 km	MPC · JPL
57728	2001 UA_{151}	—	October 23, 2001	Socorro	LINEAR	·	3.8 km	MPC · JPL
57729	2001 UB_{151}	—	October 23, 2001	Socorro	LINEAR	ADE	4.9 km	MPC · JPL
57730	2001 UE_{151}	—	October 23, 2001	Socorro	LINEAR	NYS	2.0 km	MPC · JPL
57731	2001 UN_{154}	—	October 23, 2001	Socorro	LINEAR	·	4.8 km	MPC · JPL
57732	2001 UE_{158}	—	October 23, 2001	Socorro	LINEAR	·	3.7 km	MPC · JPL
57733	2001 UU_{158}	—	October 23, 2001	Socorro	LINEAR	·	3.2 km	MPC · JPL
57734	2001 UA_{159}	—	October 23, 2001	Socorro	LINEAR	·	3.0 km	MPC · JPL
57735	2001 UQ_{159}	—	October 23, 2001	Socorro	LINEAR	KOR	3.1 km	MPC · JPL
57736	2001 UW_{159}	—	October 23, 2001	Socorro	LINEAR	V	1.8 km	MPC · JPL
57737	2001 UT_{160}	—	October 23, 2001	Socorro	LINEAR	·	3.8 km	MPC · JPL
57738	2001 UZ_{160}	—	October 23, 2001	Socorro	LINEAR	·	3.2 km	MPC · JPL
57739	2001 UF_{162}	—	October 23, 2001	Socorro	LINEAR	·	5.4 km	MPC · JPL
57740	2001 UK_{162}	—	October 23, 2001	Socorro	LINEAR	·	3.9 km	MPC · JPL
57741	2001 UN_{162}	—	October 23, 2001	Socorro	LINEAR	·	4.1 km	MPC · JPL
57742	2001 UA_{163}	—	October 23, 2001	Socorro	LINEAR	NYS	2.9 km	MPC · JPL
57743	2001 UB_{168}	—	October 19, 2001	Socorro	LINEAR	EUN	4.0 km	MPC · JPL
57744	2001 UN_{170}	—	October 21, 2001	Socorro	LINEAR	·	2.8 km	MPC · JPL
57745	2001 UT_{170}	—	October 21, 2001	Socorro	LINEAR	·	3.2 km	MPC · JPL
57746	2001 UN_{172}	—	October 18, 2001	Palomar	NEAT	·	1.8 km	MPC · JPL
57747	2001 UY_{183}	—	October 16, 2001	Socorro	LINEAR	·	4.1 km	MPC · JPL
57748	2001 UG_{219}	—	October 23, 2001	Palomar	NEAT	·	2.9 km	MPC · JPL
57749	2001 UD_{220}	—	October 21, 2001	Socorro	LINEAR	·	3.5 km	MPC · JPL
57750	2001 VQ	—	November 7, 2001	Socorro	LINEAR	·	9.8 km	MPC · JPL
57751	2001 VB_{1}	—	November 6, 2001	Socorro	LINEAR	·	4.3 km	MPC · JPL
57752	2001 VX_{8}	—	November 9, 2001	Socorro	LINEAR	·	3.7 km	MPC · JPL
57753	2001 VL_{12}	—	November 10, 2001	Socorro	LINEAR	VER	7.9 km	MPC · JPL
57754	2001 VW_{12}	—	November 10, 2001	Socorro	LINEAR	PHO	3.2 km	MPC · JPL
57755	2001 VC_{13}	—	November 10, 2001	Socorro	LINEAR	·	5.8 km	MPC · JPL
57756	2001 VQ_{16}	—	November 7, 2001	Palomar	NEAT	EOS	4.9 km	MPC · JPL
57757	2001 VT_{17}	—	November 9, 2001	Socorro	LINEAR	·	3.8 km	MPC · JPL
57758	2001 VW_{20}	—	November 9, 2001	Socorro	LINEAR	KOR	3.4 km	MPC · JPL
57759	2001 VW_{22}	—	November 9, 2001	Socorro	LINEAR	3:2 · SHU	11 km	MPC · JPL
57760	2001 VH_{23}	—	November 9, 2001	Socorro	LINEAR	THM	5.4 km	MPC · JPL
57761	2001 VQ_{26}	—	November 9, 2001	Socorro	LINEAR	·	3.1 km	MPC · JPL
57762	2001 VK_{27}	—	November 9, 2001	Socorro	LINEAR	·	4.8 km	MPC · JPL
57763	2001 VF_{29}	—	November 9, 2001	Socorro	LINEAR	·	9.1 km	MPC · JPL
57764	2001 VE_{30}	—	November 9, 2001	Socorro	LINEAR	·	4.0 km	MPC · JPL
57765	2001 VR_{30}	—	November 9, 2001	Socorro	LINEAR	·	3.6 km	MPC · JPL
57766	2001 VC_{35}	—	November 9, 2001	Socorro	LINEAR	·	5.5 km	MPC · JPL
57767	2001 VX_{37}	—	November 9, 2001	Socorro	LINEAR	KOR	2.8 km	MPC · JPL
57768	2001 VO_{41}	—	November 9, 2001	Socorro	LINEAR	·	4.3 km	MPC · JPL
57769	2001 VH_{43}	—	November 9, 2001	Socorro	LINEAR	·	5.2 km	MPC · JPL
57770	2001 VA_{45}	—	November 9, 2001	Socorro	LINEAR	NEM	7.5 km	MPC · JPL
57771	2001 VK_{48}	—	November 9, 2001	Socorro	LINEAR	·	4.0 km	MPC · JPL
57772	2001 VM_{49}	—	November 10, 2001	Socorro	LINEAR	·	4.2 km	MPC · JPL
57773	2001 VG_{50}	—	November 10, 2001	Socorro	LINEAR	·	2.9 km	MPC · JPL
57774	2001 VH_{50}	—	November 10, 2001	Socorro	LINEAR	·	4.6 km	MPC · JPL
57775	2001 VS_{51}	—	November 10, 2001	Socorro	LINEAR	·	2.2 km	MPC · JPL
57776	2001 VD_{54}	—	November 10, 2001	Socorro	LINEAR	·	3.6 km	MPC · JPL
57777	2001 VO_{63}	—	November 10, 2001	Socorro	LINEAR	EOS ·	8.6 km	MPC · JPL
57778	2001 VJ_{64}	—	November 10, 2001	Socorro	LINEAR	·	3.3 km	MPC · JPL
57779	2001 VX_{73}	—	November 11, 2001	Socorro	LINEAR	·	5.4 km	MPC · JPL
57780	2001 VN_{77}	—	November 12, 2001	Haleakala	NEAT	V	1.9 km	MPC · JPL
57781	2001 VA_{79}	—	November 9, 2001	Palomar	NEAT	·	1.6 km	MPC · JPL
57782	2001 VN_{79}	—	November 9, 2001	Palomar	NEAT	·	2.6 km	MPC · JPL
57783	2001 VQ_{79}	—	November 9, 2001	Palomar	NEAT	·	4.0 km	MPC · JPL
57784	2001 VW_{85}	—	November 12, 2001	Socorro	LINEAR	·	3.1 km	MPC · JPL
57785	2001 VY_{85}	—	November 12, 2001	Socorro	LINEAR	·	4.4 km	MPC · JPL
57786	2001 VB_{87}	—	November 15, 2001	Socorro	LINEAR	EUN	3.2 km	MPC · JPL
57787	2001 VX_{87}	—	November 12, 2001	Haleakala	NEAT	VER	6.2 km	MPC · JPL
57788	2001 VE_{88}	—	November 12, 2001	Haleakala	NEAT	·	2.1 km	MPC · JPL
57789	2001 VW_{90}	—	November 15, 2001	Socorro	LINEAR	·	5.4 km	MPC · JPL
57790	2001 VO_{92}	—	November 15, 2001	Socorro	LINEAR	·	5.0 km	MPC · JPL
57791	2001 VK_{93}	—	November 15, 2001	Socorro	LINEAR	·	4.2 km	MPC · JPL
57792	2001 VQ_{94}	—	November 15, 2001	Socorro	LINEAR	EUN	3.4 km	MPC · JPL
57793	2001 VZ_{94}	—	November 15, 2001	Socorro	LINEAR	·	7.3 km	MPC · JPL
57794	2001 VK_{97}	—	November 15, 2001	Socorro	LINEAR	·	10 km	MPC · JPL
57795	2001 VM_{99}	—	November 15, 2001	Socorro	LINEAR	·	5.5 km	MPC · JPL
57796	2001 VO_{99}	—	November 15, 2001	Socorro	LINEAR	MAR	2.7 km	MPC · JPL
57797	2001 VX_{99}	—	November 15, 2001	Socorro	LINEAR	·	6.2 km	MPC · JPL
57798	2001 VM_{101}	—	November 12, 2001	Socorro	LINEAR	·	3.8 km	MPC · JPL
57799	2001 VJ_{102}	—	November 12, 2001	Socorro	LINEAR	·	3.2 km	MPC · JPL
57800	2001 VK_{104}	—	November 12, 2001	Socorro	LINEAR	·	7.6 km	MPC · JPL

== 57801–57900 ==
back to top

Designation			Discovery			Properties		Ref
Permanent	Provisional	Named after	Date	Site	Discoverer(s)	Category	Diam.	Ref
57801	2001 VW_{107}	—	November 12, 2001	Socorro	LINEAR	·	6.1 km	MPC · JPL
57802	2001 VO_{108}	—	November 12, 2001	Socorro	LINEAR	·	5.9 km	MPC · JPL
57803	2001 VW_{108}	—	November 12, 2001	Socorro	LINEAR	·	3.6 km	MPC · JPL
57804	2001 VQ_{118}	—	November 12, 2001	Socorro	LINEAR	·	5.8 km	MPC · JPL
57805	2001 VA_{119}	—	November 12, 2001	Socorro	LINEAR	KOR	3.0 km	MPC · JPL
57806	2001 VR_{121}	—	November 15, 2001	Palomar	NEAT	·	3.1 km	MPC · JPL
57807	2001 VV_{121}	—	November 13, 2001	Haleakala	NEAT	EUN	3.8 km	MPC · JPL
57808	2001 VF_{122}	—	November 13, 2001	Haleakala	NEAT	·	7.9 km	MPC · JPL
57809	2001 VS_{122}	—	November 15, 2001	Palomar	NEAT	·	12 km	MPC · JPL
57810	2001 WC	—	November 16, 2001	Oizumi	T. Kobayashi	·	4.9 km	MPC · JPL
57811	2001 WE_{17}	—	November 17, 2001	Socorro	LINEAR	·	5.2 km	MPC · JPL
57812	2001 WH_{20}	—	November 17, 2001	Socorro	LINEAR	·	3.3 km	MPC · JPL
57813	2001 WZ_{21}	—	November 18, 2001	Socorro	LINEAR	EOS	4.0 km	MPC · JPL
57814	2001 WK_{25}	—	November 17, 2001	Socorro	LINEAR	PAD	2.9 km	MPC · JPL
57815	2001 WV_{25}	—	November 17, 2001	Socorro	LINEAR	·	2.2 km	MPC · JPL
57816	2001 WW_{26}	—	November 17, 2001	Socorro	LINEAR	·	4.8 km	MPC · JPL
57817	2001 WL_{27}	—	November 17, 2001	Socorro	LINEAR	·	6.5 km	MPC · JPL
57818	2001 WB_{28}	—	November 17, 2001	Socorro	LINEAR	·	1.7 km	MPC · JPL
57819	2001 WW_{28}	—	November 17, 2001	Socorro	LINEAR	·	4.4 km	MPC · JPL
57820	2001 WQ_{40}	—	November 17, 2001	Socorro	LINEAR	·	3.7 km	MPC · JPL
57821	2001 WD_{44}	—	November 18, 2001	Socorro	LINEAR	·	8.0 km	MPC · JPL
57822	2001 WV_{45}	—	November 19, 2001	Socorro	LINEAR	NYS	3.1 km	MPC · JPL
57823	2001 WD_{47}	—	November 16, 2001	Palomar	NEAT	·	3.6 km	MPC · JPL
57824	2001 WT_{48}	—	November 19, 2001	Anderson Mesa	LONEOS	TEL	3.4 km	MPC · JPL
57825	2001 WP_{76}	—	November 20, 2001	Socorro	LINEAR	·	5.1 km	MPC · JPL
57826	2001 WB_{90}	—	November 21, 2001	Socorro	LINEAR	VER	5.3 km	MPC · JPL
57827	2001 WM_{91}	—	November 21, 2001	Socorro	LINEAR	·	5.8 km	MPC · JPL
57828	2001 XZ_{4}	—	December 9, 2001	Uccle	T. Pauwels	EOS	4.3 km	MPC · JPL
57829	2001 XZ_{9}	—	December 9, 2001	Socorro	LINEAR	·	5.7 km	MPC · JPL
57830	2001 XW_{11}	—	December 9, 2001	Socorro	LINEAR	EOS	4.6 km	MPC · JPL
57831	2001 XX_{16}	—	December 9, 2001	Socorro	LINEAR	(5)	3.6 km	MPC · JPL
57832	2001 XL_{18}	—	December 9, 2001	Socorro	LINEAR	·	2.6 km	MPC · JPL
57833	2001 XD_{26}	—	December 10, 2001	Socorro	LINEAR	HNS	4.4 km	MPC · JPL
57834	2001 XE_{28}	—	December 10, 2001	Socorro	LINEAR	·	10 km	MPC · JPL
57835	2001 XO_{36}	—	December 9, 2001	Socorro	LINEAR	EOS	4.1 km	MPC · JPL
57836	2001 XL_{39}	—	December 9, 2001	Socorro	LINEAR	EOS	5.1 km	MPC · JPL
57837	2001 XZ_{39}	—	December 14, 2001	Socorro	LINEAR	EOS	6.6 km	MPC · JPL
57838	2001 XF_{49}	—	December 10, 2001	Socorro	LINEAR	·	5.2 km	MPC · JPL
57839	2001 XF_{50}	—	December 10, 2001	Socorro	LINEAR	MAS	1.7 km	MPC · JPL
57840	2001 XY_{52}	—	December 10, 2001	Socorro	LINEAR	·	3.4 km	MPC · JPL
57841	2001 XG_{53}	—	December 10, 2001	Socorro	LINEAR	·	2.1 km	MPC · JPL
57842	2001 XQ_{53}	—	December 10, 2001	Socorro	LINEAR	HYG	5.0 km	MPC · JPL
57843	2001 XO_{59}	—	December 10, 2001	Socorro	LINEAR	V	2.5 km	MPC · JPL
57844	2001 XV_{60}	—	December 10, 2001	Socorro	LINEAR	·	3.6 km	MPC · JPL
57845	2001 XN_{71}	—	December 11, 2001	Socorro	LINEAR	TEL	3.1 km	MPC · JPL
57846	2001 XR_{72}	—	December 11, 2001	Socorro	LINEAR	EOS	5.3 km	MPC · JPL
57847	2001 XP_{80}	—	December 11, 2001	Socorro	LINEAR	·	5.7 km	MPC · JPL
57848	2001 XC_{81}	—	December 11, 2001	Socorro	LINEAR	·	4.8 km	MPC · JPL
57849	2001 XR_{86}	—	December 11, 2001	Socorro	LINEAR	·	10 km	MPC · JPL
57850	2001 XX_{89}	—	December 10, 2001	Socorro	LINEAR	NYS	2.6 km	MPC · JPL
57851	2001 XJ_{97}	—	December 10, 2001	Socorro	LINEAR	·	7.2 km	MPC · JPL
57852	2001 XM_{97}	—	December 10, 2001	Socorro	LINEAR	·	2.0 km	MPC · JPL
57853	2001 XG_{98}	—	December 10, 2001	Socorro	LINEAR	·	7.0 km	MPC · JPL
57854	2001 XD_{132}	—	December 14, 2001	Socorro	LINEAR	·	3.9 km	MPC · JPL
57855	2001 XT_{144}	—	December 14, 2001	Socorro	LINEAR	EUN	3.8 km	MPC · JPL
57856	2001 XE_{203}	—	December 11, 2001	Socorro	LINEAR	·	4.3 km	MPC · JPL
57857	2001 XJ_{203}	—	December 11, 2001	Socorro	LINEAR	·	3.2 km	MPC · JPL
57858	2001 XU_{204}	—	December 11, 2001	Socorro	LINEAR	V	2.1 km	MPC · JPL
57859	2001 XK_{207}	—	December 11, 2001	Socorro	LINEAR	EOS	3.9 km	MPC · JPL
57860	2001 XS_{214}	—	December 13, 2001	Socorro	LINEAR	·	6.6 km	MPC · JPL
57861	2001 XL_{221}	—	December 15, 2001	Socorro	LINEAR	THM	5.8 km	MPC · JPL
57862	2001 XR_{226}	—	December 15, 2001	Socorro	LINEAR	·	2.6 km	MPC · JPL
57863	2001 XT_{227}	—	December 15, 2001	Socorro	LINEAR	EUN	3.2 km	MPC · JPL
57864	2001 XY_{229}	—	December 15, 2001	Socorro	LINEAR	THM	5.3 km	MPC · JPL
57865	2001 XZ_{229}	—	December 15, 2001	Socorro	LINEAR	KOR	2.7 km	MPC · JPL
57866	2001 XU_{244}	—	December 15, 2001	Socorro	LINEAR	·	4.1 km	MPC · JPL
57867	2001 XS_{256}	—	December 7, 2001	Socorro	LINEAR	·	4.2 km	MPC · JPL
57868 Pupin	2001 YD	Pupin	December 17, 2001	Palomar	NEAT	slow	5.7 km	MPC · JPL
57869	2001 YM_{24}	—	December 18, 2001	Socorro	LINEAR	·	3.1 km	MPC · JPL
57870	2001 YG_{46}	—	December 18, 2001	Socorro	LINEAR	URS	8.8 km	MPC · JPL
57871	2001 YB_{52}	—	December 18, 2001	Socorro	LINEAR	·	6.1 km	MPC · JPL
57872	2001 YU_{87}	—	December 18, 2001	Socorro	LINEAR	·	9.6 km	MPC · JPL
57873	2001 YF_{98}	—	December 17, 2001	Socorro	LINEAR	THB	9.7 km	MPC · JPL
57874	2001 YR_{110}	—	December 18, 2001	Anderson Mesa	LONEOS	PHO	3.4 km	MPC · JPL
57875	2001 YV_{114}	—	December 20, 2001	Haleakala	NEAT	·	9.1 km	MPC · JPL
57876	2001 YB_{122}	—	December 17, 2001	Socorro	LINEAR	·	4.2 km	MPC · JPL
57877	2001 YT_{123}	—	December 17, 2001	Socorro	LINEAR	V	2.6 km	MPC · JPL
57878	2001 YZ_{148}	—	December 18, 2001	Anderson Mesa	LONEOS	·	3.4 km	MPC · JPL
57879 Cesarechiosi	2002 AD_{1}	Cesarechiosi	January 2, 2002	Cima Ekar	ADAS	GEF	2.7 km	MPC · JPL
57880	2002 AN_{3}	—	January 2, 2002	Uccle	T. Pauwels	·	6.4 km	MPC · JPL
57881	2002 AZ_{35}	—	January 9, 2002	Socorro	LINEAR	MAR	4.1 km	MPC · JPL
57882	2002 AB_{36}	—	January 9, 2002	Socorro	LINEAR	·	4.8 km	MPC · JPL
57883	2002 AR_{72}	—	January 8, 2002	Socorro	LINEAR	·	5.5 km	MPC · JPL
57884	2002 AU_{90}	—	January 13, 2002	Socorro	LINEAR	·	10 km	MPC · JPL
57885	2002 AU_{181}	—	January 5, 2002	Palomar	NEAT	·	8.9 km	MPC · JPL
57886	2002 AL_{183}	—	January 6, 2002	Palomar	NEAT	·	4.2 km	MPC · JPL
57887	2002 AR_{201}	—	January 5, 2002	Anderson Mesa	LONEOS	·	5.5 km	MPC · JPL
57888	2002 BS_{6}	—	January 18, 2002	Socorro	LINEAR	·	8.8 km	MPC · JPL
57889	2002 CN_{11}	—	February 2, 2002	Haleakala	NEAT	EUP	9.4 km	MPC · JPL
57890	2002 CJ_{26}	—	February 6, 2002	Socorro	LINEAR	·	4.7 km	MPC · JPL
57891	2002 CJ_{35}	—	February 6, 2002	Socorro	LINEAR	·	12 km	MPC · JPL
57892	2002 CH_{36}	—	February 7, 2002	Socorro	LINEAR	KOR	3.5 km	MPC · JPL
57893	2002 CJ_{95}	—	February 7, 2002	Socorro	LINEAR	MAS	1.8 km	MPC · JPL
57894	2002 CJ_{129}	—	February 7, 2002	Socorro	LINEAR	·	3.6 km	MPC · JPL
57895	2002 CX_{134}	—	February 8, 2002	Socorro	LINEAR	EOS	5.0 km	MPC · JPL
57896	2002 CN_{201}	—	February 10, 2002	Socorro	LINEAR	·	2.4 km	MPC · JPL
57897	2002 CV_{213}	—	February 10, 2002	Socorro	LINEAR	·	7.2 km	MPC · JPL
57898	2002 CF_{237}	—	February 10, 2002	Socorro	LINEAR	RAF	4.0 km	MPC · JPL
57899	2002 CU_{237}	—	February 10, 2002	Socorro	LINEAR	EUN	3.5 km	MPC · JPL
57900	2002 CY_{239}	—	February 11, 2002	Socorro	LINEAR	(5)	3.6 km	MPC · JPL

== 57901–58000 ==
back to top

Designation			Discovery			Properties		Ref
Permanent	Provisional	Named after	Date	Site	Discoverer(s)	Category	Diam.	Ref
57901 Hitchens	2002 CH_{275}	Hitchens	February 9, 2002	Anderson Mesa	LONEOS	EUN	5.9 km	MPC · JPL
57902	2002 CR_{307}	—	February 8, 2002	Socorro	LINEAR	PHO	3.0 km	MPC · JPL
57903	2002 EX_{16}	—	March 6, 2002	Socorro	LINEAR	·	2.3 km	MPC · JPL
57904	2002 ER_{25}	—	March 10, 2002	Anderson Mesa	LONEOS	L4	22 km	MPC · JPL
57905	2002 EO_{30}	—	March 9, 2002	Socorro	LINEAR	·	2.1 km	MPC · JPL
57906	2002 EO_{31}	—	March 10, 2002	Socorro	LINEAR	AGN	3.1 km	MPC · JPL
57907	2002 EQ_{31}	—	March 10, 2002	Socorro	LINEAR	·	4.9 km	MPC · JPL
57908	2002 ER_{31}	—	March 11, 2002	Socorro	LINEAR	GEF	4.1 km	MPC · JPL
57909	2002 ED_{33}	—	March 11, 2002	Palomar	NEAT	EUN	1.8 km	MPC · JPL
57910	2002 ED_{61}	—	March 13, 2002	Socorro	LINEAR	L4	14 km	MPC · JPL
57911	2002 EE_{96}	—	March 15, 2002	Socorro	LINEAR	·	1.9 km	MPC · JPL
57912	2002 ES_{99}	—	March 3, 2002	Haleakala	NEAT	·	3.2 km	MPC · JPL
57913	2002 EJ_{107}	—	March 9, 2002	Anderson Mesa	LONEOS	PHO	2.4 km	MPC · JPL
57914	2002 EC_{109}	—	March 9, 2002	Kitt Peak	Spacewatch	·	2.2 km	MPC · JPL
57915 Mahuchikh	2002 EB_{110}	Mahuchikh	March 9, 2002	Catalina	CSS	L4	18 km	MPC · JPL
57916	2002 EC_{111}	—	March 9, 2002	Anderson Mesa	LONEOS	·	3.3 km	MPC · JPL
57917	2002 EK_{111}	—	March 9, 2002	Catalina	CSS	V · fast	2.1 km	MPC · JPL
57918	2002 EE_{120}	—	March 10, 2002	Haleakala	NEAT	·	1.5 km	MPC · JPL
57919	2002 EE_{129}	—	March 13, 2002	Socorro	LINEAR	·	3.7 km	MPC · JPL
57920	2002 EL_{153}	—	March 15, 2002	Kitt Peak	Spacewatch	L4	17 km	MPC · JPL
57921	2002 EY_{154}	—	March 10, 2002	Haleakala	NEAT	·	3.4 km	MPC · JPL
57922	2002 FU_{8}	—	March 16, 2002	Socorro	LINEAR	·	4.0 km	MPC · JPL
57923	2002 FQ_{14}	—	March 16, 2002	Socorro	LINEAR	·	2.3 km	MPC · JPL
57924	2002 FO_{28}	—	March 20, 2002	Socorro	LINEAR	·	4.0 km	MPC · JPL
57925	2002 FQ_{30}	—	March 20, 2002	Socorro	LINEAR	·	3.4 km	MPC · JPL
57926	2002 FV_{34}	—	March 20, 2002	Anderson Mesa	LONEOS	·	4.3 km	MPC · JPL
57927	2002 GX_{37}	—	April 3, 2002	Kitt Peak	Spacewatch	(5)	3.6 km	MPC · JPL
57928	2002 GD_{77}	—	April 9, 2002	Anderson Mesa	LONEOS	PAD	5.7 km	MPC · JPL
57929	2002 GB_{86}	—	April 10, 2002	Socorro	LINEAR	·	1.9 km	MPC · JPL
57930	2002 GJ_{97}	—	April 9, 2002	Socorro	LINEAR	·	1.7 km	MPC · JPL
57931	2002 GX_{159}	—	April 14, 2002	Palomar	NEAT	·	3.0 km	MPC · JPL
57932	2002 GA_{161}	—	April 15, 2002	Anderson Mesa	LONEOS	·	2.0 km	MPC · JPL
57933	2002 HH_{17}	—	April 19, 2002	Socorro	LINEAR	·	6.6 km	MPC · JPL
57934	2002 JZ_{7}	—	May 6, 2002	Palomar	NEAT	·	2.0 km	MPC · JPL
57935	2002 JL_{17}	—	May 7, 2002	Palomar	NEAT	·	3.9 km	MPC · JPL
57936	2002 JU_{23}	—	May 8, 2002	Socorro	LINEAR	NYS	1.5 km	MPC · JPL
57937	2002 JJ_{30}	—	May 9, 2002	Socorro	LINEAR	(3460)	7.5 km	MPC · JPL
57938	2002 JT_{33}	—	May 9, 2002	Socorro	LINEAR	·	3.7 km	MPC · JPL
57939	2002 JY_{33}	—	May 9, 2002	Socorro	LINEAR	·	2.4 km	MPC · JPL
57940	2002 JJ_{38}	—	May 9, 2002	Palomar	NEAT	·	6.1 km	MPC · JPL
57941	2002 JA_{40}	—	May 7, 2002	Socorro	LINEAR	·	6.2 km	MPC · JPL
57942	2002 JM_{40}	—	May 8, 2002	Socorro	LINEAR	·	3.0 km	MPC · JPL
57943	2002 JO_{41}	—	May 8, 2002	Socorro	LINEAR	·	2.6 km	MPC · JPL
57944	2002 JJ_{46}	—	May 9, 2002	Socorro	LINEAR	·	3.9 km	MPC · JPL
57945	2002 JG_{50}	—	May 9, 2002	Socorro	LINEAR	·	1.9 km	MPC · JPL
57946	2002 JG_{61}	—	May 8, 2002	Socorro	LINEAR	·	3.3 km	MPC · JPL
57947	2002 JB_{62}	—	May 8, 2002	Socorro	LINEAR	·	2.0 km	MPC · JPL
57948	2002 JO_{62}	—	May 8, 2002	Socorro	LINEAR	·	8.5 km	MPC · JPL
57949	2002 JV_{66}	—	May 10, 2002	Socorro	LINEAR	·	1.4 km	MPC · JPL
57950	2002 JV_{72}	—	May 8, 2002	Socorro	LINEAR	VER	6.7 km	MPC · JPL
57951	2002 JJ_{91}	—	May 11, 2002	Socorro	LINEAR	·	3.3 km	MPC · JPL
57952	2002 JP_{93}	—	May 11, 2002	Socorro	LINEAR	·	2.9 km	MPC · JPL
57953	2002 JJ_{95}	—	May 11, 2002	Socorro	LINEAR	KOR	2.9 km	MPC · JPL
57954	2002 JA_{101}	—	May 6, 2002	Socorro	LINEAR	T_{j} (2.92) · CYB	18 km	MPC · JPL
57955	2002 JV_{103}	—	May 10, 2002	Socorro	LINEAR	·	2.8 km	MPC · JPL
57956	2002 JL_{105}	—	May 12, 2002	Socorro	LINEAR	HYG	6.4 km	MPC · JPL
57957	2002 JZ_{105}	—	May 13, 2002	Socorro	LINEAR	THM	4.7 km	MPC · JPL
57958	2002 JC_{118}	—	May 4, 2002	Palomar	NEAT	AEG	8.2 km	MPC · JPL
57959	2002 JH_{118}	—	May 5, 2002	Palomar	NEAT	PHO	2.7 km	MPC · JPL
57960	2002 JE_{129}	—	May 8, 2002	Anderson Mesa	LONEOS	·	3.1 km	MPC · JPL
57961	2002 JN_{133}	—	May 9, 2002	Socorro	LINEAR	·	6.1 km	MPC · JPL
57962	2002 JP_{133}	—	May 9, 2002	Socorro	LINEAR	·	1.6 km	MPC · JPL
57963	2002 LV_{3}	—	June 4, 2002	Socorro	LINEAR	·	5.7 km	MPC · JPL
57964	2002 LY_{28}	—	June 9, 2002	Socorro	LINEAR	·	2.0 km	MPC · JPL
57965	2002 LM_{32}	—	June 9, 2002	Palomar	NEAT	·	4.4 km	MPC · JPL
57966	2002 LN_{39}	—	June 10, 2002	Socorro	LINEAR	·	1.3 km	MPC · JPL
57967	2002 LS_{45}	—	June 6, 2002	Kitt Peak	Spacewatch	·	1.7 km	MPC · JPL
57968	2002 LQ_{52}	—	June 7, 2002	Palomar	NEAT	·	9.9 km	MPC · JPL
57969	2002 MT_{2}	—	June 17, 2002	Palomar	NEAT	·	3.8 km	MPC · JPL
57970	2002 NT_{13}	—	July 4, 2002	Palomar	NEAT	KOR	3.4 km	MPC · JPL
57971	2002 NJ_{41}	—	July 13, 2002	Haleakala	NEAT	·	2.7 km	MPC · JPL
57972	2002 NQ_{51}	—	July 5, 2002	Socorro	LINEAR	·	1.6 km	MPC · JPL
57973	2002 OW	—	July 17, 2002	Socorro	LINEAR	RAF	2.7 km	MPC · JPL
57974	2002 OX_{3}	—	July 17, 2002	Socorro	LINEAR	·	5.8 km	MPC · JPL
57975	2002 OO_{11}	—	July 16, 2002	Palomar	NEAT	KON	4.9 km	MPC · JPL
57976	2002 OJ_{16}	—	July 18, 2002	Socorro	LINEAR	V	1.4 km	MPC · JPL
57977	2002 PF_{17}	—	August 6, 2002	Palomar	NEAT	·	3.8 km	MPC · JPL
57978	2002 PO_{35}	—	August 6, 2002	Palomar	NEAT	THM	3.7 km	MPC · JPL
57979	2002 PW_{49}	—	August 10, 2002	Socorro	LINEAR	THM	7.1 km	MPC · JPL
57980	2002 PZ_{85}	—	August 13, 2002	Socorro	LINEAR	·	1.6 km	MPC · JPL
57981	2002 PF_{104}	—	August 12, 2002	Socorro	LINEAR	·	2.5 km	MPC · JPL
57982	2002 PB_{110}	—	August 13, 2002	Socorro	LINEAR	·	4.8 km	MPC · JPL
57983	2002 PT_{117}	—	August 12, 2002	Haleakala	NEAT	·	3.0 km	MPC · JPL
57984	2002 PG_{124}	—	August 13, 2002	Kitt Peak	Spacewatch	KOR	2.6 km	MPC · JPL
57985	2002 PL_{129}	—	August 15, 2002	Palomar	NEAT	·	3.5 km	MPC · JPL
57986	2002 PA_{134}	—	August 14, 2002	Socorro	LINEAR	·	4.2 km	MPC · JPL
57987	2002 QQ_{6}	—	August 19, 2002	Kvistaberg	Uppsala-DLR Asteroid Survey	·	2.1 km	MPC · JPL
57988	2002 RG_{27}	—	September 5, 2002	Socorro	LINEAR	·	4.6 km	MPC · JPL
57989	2002 RU_{32}	—	September 4, 2002	Anderson Mesa	LONEOS	·	5.4 km	MPC · JPL
57990	2002 RJ_{34}	—	September 4, 2002	Anderson Mesa	LONEOS	·	3.0 km	MPC · JPL
57991	2002 RF_{40}	—	September 5, 2002	Socorro	LINEAR	·	7.2 km	MPC · JPL
57992	2002 RX_{47}	—	September 5, 2002	Socorro	LINEAR	NYS	2.9 km	MPC · JPL
57993	2002 RX_{56}	—	September 5, 2002	Anderson Mesa	LONEOS	·	3.9 km	MPC · JPL
57994	2002 RR_{86}	—	September 5, 2002	Socorro	LINEAR	·	8.6 km	MPC · JPL
57995	2002 RJ_{102}	—	September 5, 2002	Socorro	LINEAR	·	3.0 km	MPC · JPL
57996	2002 RV_{107}	—	September 5, 2002	Socorro	LINEAR	·	3.4 km	MPC · JPL
57997	2002 RN_{110}	—	September 6, 2002	Socorro	LINEAR	·	1.6 km	MPC · JPL
57998	2002 SO_{9}	—	September 27, 2002	Palomar	NEAT	·	4.6 km	MPC · JPL
57999	2002 TN_{52}	—	October 2, 2002	Socorro	LINEAR	·	4.7 km	MPC · JPL
58000	2002 TC_{103}	—	October 4, 2002	Socorro	LINEAR	·	7.7 km	MPC · JPL

back to top

== See also ==
- Meanings of minor-planet names: 57001–58000
