= Hitchen =

Hitchen is a surname. Notable people with the surname include:

- Albert Hitchen (1938–2015), English professional road racing cyclist
- Brian Hitchen (1936–2013), British publisher and newspaper editor
- Cedric Hitchen (1905–1975), English cricketer and chemist
- Charles Hitchen (c. 1675 – 1727), English mobster
- Gillian Hitchen (born 1959), English athlete
- Harry Hitchen (1922–1993), English footballer
- Joseph Edward Hitchen, pseudonym Joe E. Legend (born 1969), Canadian professional wrestler
- Kris Hitchen (born 1974), English actor
- Steve Hitchen (born 1976), English footballer
- Trevor Hitchen (born 1926), English footballer and manager
- William Thomas Hitchen, Australian Army soldier

== See also ==
- Hitchens
