= Hitchins =

Hitchins is a surname of early medieval English origin.

Notable people with the surname include:

- Ada Hitchins (1891–1972), English nuclear chemist
- Arthur Hitchins (1912–1975), English footballer
- Derek Hitchins (born 1935), British systems engineer
- Keith Hitchins (1931–2020), American historian member of the Romanian Academy
- Malachy Hitchins (1741–1809), English astronomer and cleric
- Richardson Hitchins (born 1997), American boxer
- Shawn Hitchins (born 1980), Canadian comedian

== See also ==
- Hitchin
- Hitchens
- Hitchins, Kentucky
