= John Dunn (political theorist) =

British political theorist (born 1940)

John Dunn FBA
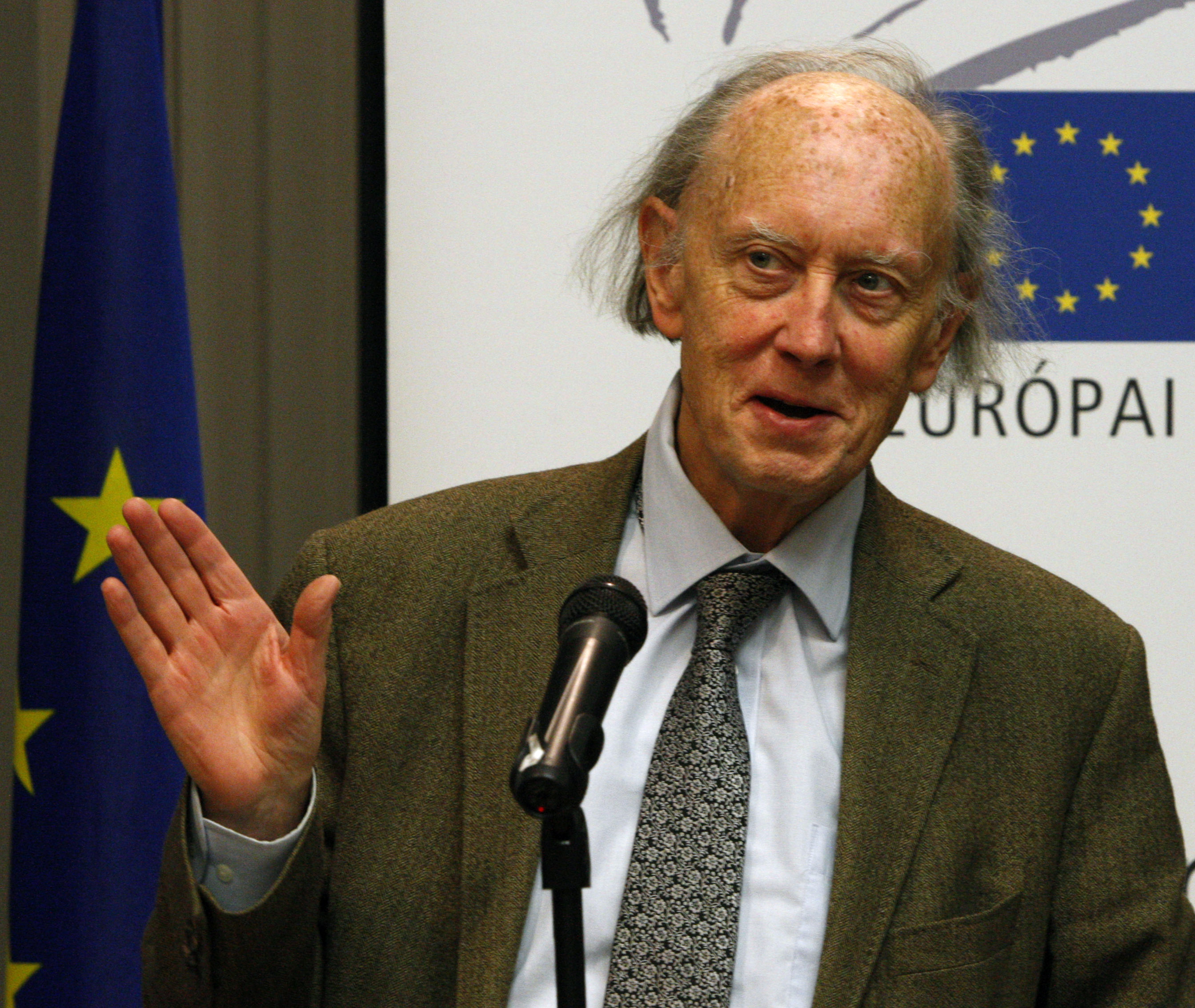
- Dunn in 2013
- Born: John Montfort Dunn; 9 September 1940 (age 86)
- Spouses: Susan Deborah, née Fyvel (m. 1965; div. 1971); Judith Dunn (m. 1973; div. 1987); Ruth Scurr (m. 1997; div. 2013); Anastasia Piliavsky (m. 2014)

Academic background
- Education: King's College, Cambridge

Academic work
- Discipline: Political studies
- Sub-discipline: Political theory
- Institutions: Jesus College, Cambridge; King's College, Cambridge

John Montfort Dunn FBA (born 9 September 1940) is a British political theorist who is emeritus professor of political theory at King's College, Cambridge and visiting professor in the Graduate School of Social Sciences and Humanities at Chiba University.

== Biography ==
The son of Colonel Henry George Montfort Dunn and Catherine Mary (née Kinloch), Dunn was educated at Winchester and Millfield. He read history at King's College, Cambridge, and was briefly (1965–1966) a fellow of Jesus College, Cambridge. He was also Harkness Fellow at Harvard University, and since 1966 of King's College, Cambridge. A lecturer in political science at Cambridge University 1972–77, Dunn became reader in politics 1977–87, and has been professor of political theory since 1987.

Dunn has been married four times: to Susan Deborah Fyvel (1965; marriage dissolved 1971); to Judy Pace (1973; marriage dissolved 1987); to Ruth Scurr (1997; marriage dissolved 2013); and to Anastasia Piliavsky (2014—).

== Achievements ==
Dunn's work focuses on applying a historical perspective to modern political theory. His early reputation was based upon the careful reconstruction of the political thought of John Locke: this benefited from Peter Laslett's critical edition of Locke's Two Treatises of Government. Together with his contemporary, the historian Quentin Skinner, and their mentor/colleague J. G. A. Pocock, he offered methodological prescriptions in the late 1960s which aimed at correcting the historical insensitivity of political science by reconstructing what past political thinkers intended to do in writing. Much of his subsequent work – reflective essays, edited collections, and several books – has tackled substantive issues in political theory, although his historical sense continues to inform a certain skepticism about the degree to which politics is ultimately amenable to reason. He is the author of The Cunning of Unreason (2001), a work that discusses how the limits of human knowledge and rationality prevent democratic republicanism from achieving all that it promises. His reflections upon the vicissitudes of democracy as a political ideal have continued with Setting the People Free: the Story of Democracy (2005).

== Works ==
- The Political Thought of John Locke (1969)
- Modern Revolutions (1972)
- Dependence and Opportunity (with A F Robertson, 1973)
- West African States: Failure and Promise (ed, 1978)
- Western Political Theory in the Face of the Future (1979)
- Political Obligation in Its Historical Context (1980)
- The Politics of Socialism (1984)
- Rethinking Modern Political Theory (1985)
- Interpreting Political Responsibility (1990)
- The Economic Limits to Modern Politics (ed, 1990)
- Democracy: the unfinished journey 508 BC – 1993 AD (ed, 1992)
- Contemporary Crisis of the Nation State? (ed, 1995)
- The History of Political Theory and Other Essays (1996)
- Great Political Thinkers (ed. with Ian Harris, 1997)
- The Cunning of Unreason (2000)
- Pensare la politica (2002)
- Locke: A Very Short Introduction (2003)
- Setting the People Free: The Story of Democracy (2005).
- Breaking Democracy's Spell (July 2014)
