= Cedric Hitchen =

English cricketer and British Army officer

Personal information
- Full name: Cedric Hitchen
- Born: 3 July 1905; Todmorden, Yorkshire, England
- Died: 21 May 1975 (aged 69); Lancaster, Lancashire, England
- Batting: Right-handed
- Bowling: Right-arm fast-medium

Domestic team information
- Years: Team
- 1943/44–1947/48: Europeans

Career statistics
| Competition | First-class |
|---|---|
| Matches | 4 |
| Runs scored | 12 |
| Batting average | 4.00 |
| 100s/50s | –/– |
| Top score | 10 |
| Balls bowled | 300 |
| Wickets | 3 |
| Bowling average | 64.00 |
| 5 wickets in innings | – |
| 10 wickets in match | – |
| Best bowling | 1/16 |
| Catches/stumpings | –/– |
- Source: ESPNcricinfo, 15 November 2021

Cedric Hitchen (3 July 1905 – 21 May 1975) was an English first-class cricketer and chemist.

The son of Elias Hitchen and Betsy Halstead, he was born at Todmorden in July 1905. He was educated at Todmorden Secondary School, from there he studied applied chemistry at the University of Manchester. He later moved to British India with his wife, Louise, where he gained employment as an industrial chemist. Having played club cricket for Todmorden in the Lancashire League prior to his departure for India, Hitchen made four appearances in first-class cricket in India for the Europeans cricket team in Madras Presidency Matches between December 1943 and January 1948. He scored 12 runs in his four first-class matches, in addition to taking three wickets with his right-arm fast-medium bowling. He remained in India following independence in 1947, where he continued to play for the Europeans who had lost their first-class status from 1948. Hitchen returned to England where he died at Lancaster in May 1975.
