= Robert Hichens =

Robert Hichens may refer to:

- Robert Hichens (writer) (1864–1950), English writer
- Robert Hichens (sailor) (1882–1940), quartermaster on the RMS Titanic
- Robert Peverell Hichens (1909–1943), RNVR officer in the Second World War
