= 57424 Caelumnoctu =

Asteroid

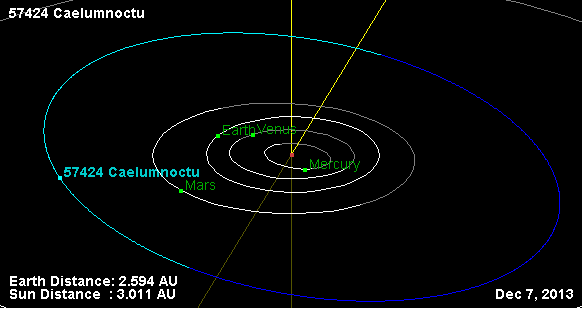
- Orbital diagram of Caelumnoctu

Discovery
- Discovered by: LINEAR
- Discovery site: Lincoln Lab's ETS
- Discovery date: 16 September 2001

Designations
- Pronunciation: /ˌsiːləmˈnɒktuː/
- Named after: The Sky at Night (BBC astronomy programme)
- Alternative designations: 2001 SP_{22} · 1982 BV_{4}
- Minor planet category: main-belt · (outer); Eos

Orbital characteristics
- Epoch 4 September 2017 (JD 2458000.5)
- Uncertainty parameter 0
- Observation arc: 35.76 yr (13,061 days)
- Aphelion: 3.3243 AU
- Perihelion: 2.7495 AU
- Semi-major axis: 3.0369 AU
- Eccentricity: 0.0946
- Orbital period (sidereal): 5.29 yr (1,933 days)
- Mean anomaly: 334.96°
- Mean motion: 0° 11^{m} 10.32^{s} / day
- Inclination: 9.6708°
- Longitude of ascending node: 353.32°
- Argument of perihelion: 45.951°

Physical characteristics
- Dimensions: 6.876±0.356 km
- Geometric albedo: 0.113±0.019
- Absolute magnitude (H): 13.7

57424 Caelumnoctu (provisional designation 2001 SP_{22}) is an Eoan asteroid from the outer regions of the asteroid belt, approximately 7 kilometers in diameter. It was discovered on 16 September 2001, by astronomers of the Lincoln Near-Earth Asteroid Research at Lincoln Laboratory's Experimental Test Site near Socorro, New Mexico. The asteroid was named for the BBC television programme The Sky at Night.

== Orbit and classification ==
Caelumnoctu is a member the Eos family (606), the largest asteroid family in the outer main belt consisting of nearly 10,000 asteroids.

It orbits the Sun at a distance of 2.7–3.3 AU once every 5 years and 3 months (1,933 days; semi-major axis of 3.04 AU). Its orbit has an eccentricity of 0.09 and an inclination of 10° with respect to the ecliptic.

The body's observation arc begins with its first identification as 1982 BV_{4} at Kiso Observatory in January 1982, more than 19 years prior to its official discovery observation at Socorro.

== Physical characteristics ==
The body's spectral type is unknown. Its albedo, however, corresponds to the K-type asteroids of which the Eos family predominantly consists.

=== Diameter and albedo ===
According to the survey carried out by the NEOWISE mission of NASA's Wide-field Infrared Survey Explorer, Caelumnoctu measures 6.876 kilometers in diameter and its surface has an albedo of 0.113.

=== Rotation period ===
As of 2017, no rotational lightcurve of Caelumnoctu has been obtained from photometric observations. The body's rotation period, poles and shape remain unknown.

== Naming ==
This minor planet was named "Caelumnoctu" (Latin for The Sky at Night) in honour of the BBC television programme which celebrated its 50th anniversary in 2007. The number "57424" refers to the date of the first broadcast, 24 April 1957.

The official naming citation was published by the Minor Planet Center on 2 April 2007 (M.P.C. 59387).
