= 57868 Pupin =

Main-belt asteroid

Discovery
- Discovered by: NEAT
- Discovery site: Palomar Obs.
- Discovery date: 17 December 2001

Designations
- Named after: Mihajlo Pupin (Serbian–American physicist)
- Alternative designations: 2001 YD · 1997 WU_{46}
- Minor planet category: main-belt · (inner); Erigone

Orbital characteristics
- Epoch 4 September 2017 (JD 2458000.5)
- Uncertainty parameter 0
- Observation arc: 19.26 yr (7,033 days)
- Aphelion: 2.9874 AU
- Perihelion: 1.7752 AU
- Semi-major axis: 2.3813 AU
- Eccentricity: 0.2545
- Orbital period (sidereal): 3.67 yr (1,342 days)
- Mean anomaly: 198.82°
- Inclination: 4.2274°
- Longitude of ascending node: 287.71°
- Argument of perihelion: 45.971°

Physical characteristics
- Dimensions: 2.59 km (calculated); 3.42±0.59 km 5.725±0.107 km
- Synodic rotation period: 108.10±0.04 h
- Geometric albedo: 0.0448±0.0065; 0.045±0.006; 0.09±0.04; 0.20 (assumed)
- Spectral type: C · S (assumed)
- Absolute magnitude (H): 15.3 · 15.2 · 15.47±0.04 · 15.67±0.14

57868 Pupin (provisional designation 2001 YD) is a dark Erigonian asteroid and slow rotator from the inner regions of the asteroid belt, approximately 3.5 kilometers in diameter. It was discovered on 17 December 2001, by astronomers of Near-Earth Asteroid Tracking (NEAT) at the Palomar Observatory in California, United States. The asteroid was named after Serbian–American physicist Mihajlo Pupin.

== Orbit and classification ==
Pupin is a member of the Erigone family, named after 163 Erigone. It orbits the Sun in the inner main-belt at a distance of 1.8–3.0 AU once every 3 years and 8 months (1,342 days). Its orbit has an eccentricity of 0.25 and an inclination of 4° with respect to the ecliptic. The body's observation arc begins with its first identification as 1997 WU_{46} at Lincoln Laboratory ETS in November 1997.

== Physical characteristics ==
Based on PanSTARRS photometric survey, Pupin is a carbonaceous C-type asteroid, while the Erigone family's overall spectral type is that of a C- and X-type (CX).

=== Slow rotator ===
In September 2015, a first rotational lightcurve of Pupin was obtained by astronomer Vladimir Benishek at Sopot Astronomical Observatory (K90), Serbia, and by American astronomer Frederick Pilcher at his Organ Mesa Observatory (G50) in New Mexico. It showed a rotation period of 108.10±0.04 hours with a brightness amplitude of 0.93 in magnitude (U=3-). This makes it a slow rotator, as asteroids of this size typically rotate within less than 20 hours once around their axis.

=== Diameter and albedo ===
According to the survey carried out by the NEOWISE mission of NASA's space-based Wide-field Infrared Survey Explorer, Pupin measures 3.42 and 5.7 kilometers in diameter and its surface has an albedo of 0.045 and 0.09, respectively. However, the Collaborative Asteroid Lightcurve Link assumes a standard albedo for stony asteroids of 0.20, and calculates a diameter of 2.6 kilometers using an absolute magnitude of 15.3.

== Naming ==
This minor planet was named in honor of Serbian–American physicist and humanitarian, Mihajlo Pupin (1858–1935). He greatly improved long-distance telephone transmission and the sensitivity of X-ray detection, and worked for Serbian emigres. The asteroid's name was suggested by the above-mentioned astronomers Vladimir Benishek and Frederick Pilcher. The official naming citation was published by the Minor Planet Center on 23 March 2016 (M.P.C. 99354).
