= Adjustable square =

Adjustable square may refer to:

- Combination square, a measuring and marking tool
- Double-square painting, a style of canvas used in art
