= Turks Head, Belgravia =

Pub in Belgravia, London

The Turks Head
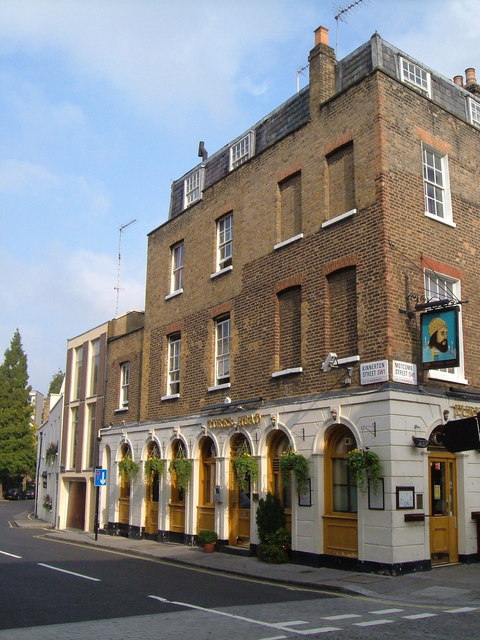
- The Turks Head in 2006
- Type: Public house
- Location: Motcomb Street, Belgravia, London

Listed Building – Grade II
- Official name: The Turks Head
- Designated: 01-Dec-1987
- Reference no.: 1223568

The Turks Head is a Grade II listed public house located on Motcomb Street on the corner with Kinnerton Street, Belgravia, London and built in the early 19th century.

It was a pub at least as early as 1848.

It is now trading as The Alfred Tennyson, and is primarily a restaurant operated by Cubitt House.
