= Double-square painting =

Paintings

A double-square painting is a painting made on uncommonly large canvases, which have one dimension that is twice the size of the other. Vincent van Gogh used 50 cm × 100 cm (20 in × 39 in) double-squares almost exclusively during the final weeks of his life in Auvers, in June and July 1890. Other artists who have painted double-square canvases include Charles-François Daubigny, Puvis de Chavannes, and Ivon Hitchens.

== Description ==
In a double-square painting, one dimension of the canvas is twice the size of the other, so that the canvas is the shape of two adjoining squares. The overall effect of this is stability, and the compositional challenge is to avoid monotony.

== Use ==
Prior to Van Gogh, artists such as Charles-François Daubigny and Puvis de Chavannes had used canvases of similar proportions, and Van Gogh was aware of this.

=== Van Gogh's double-square canvases ===
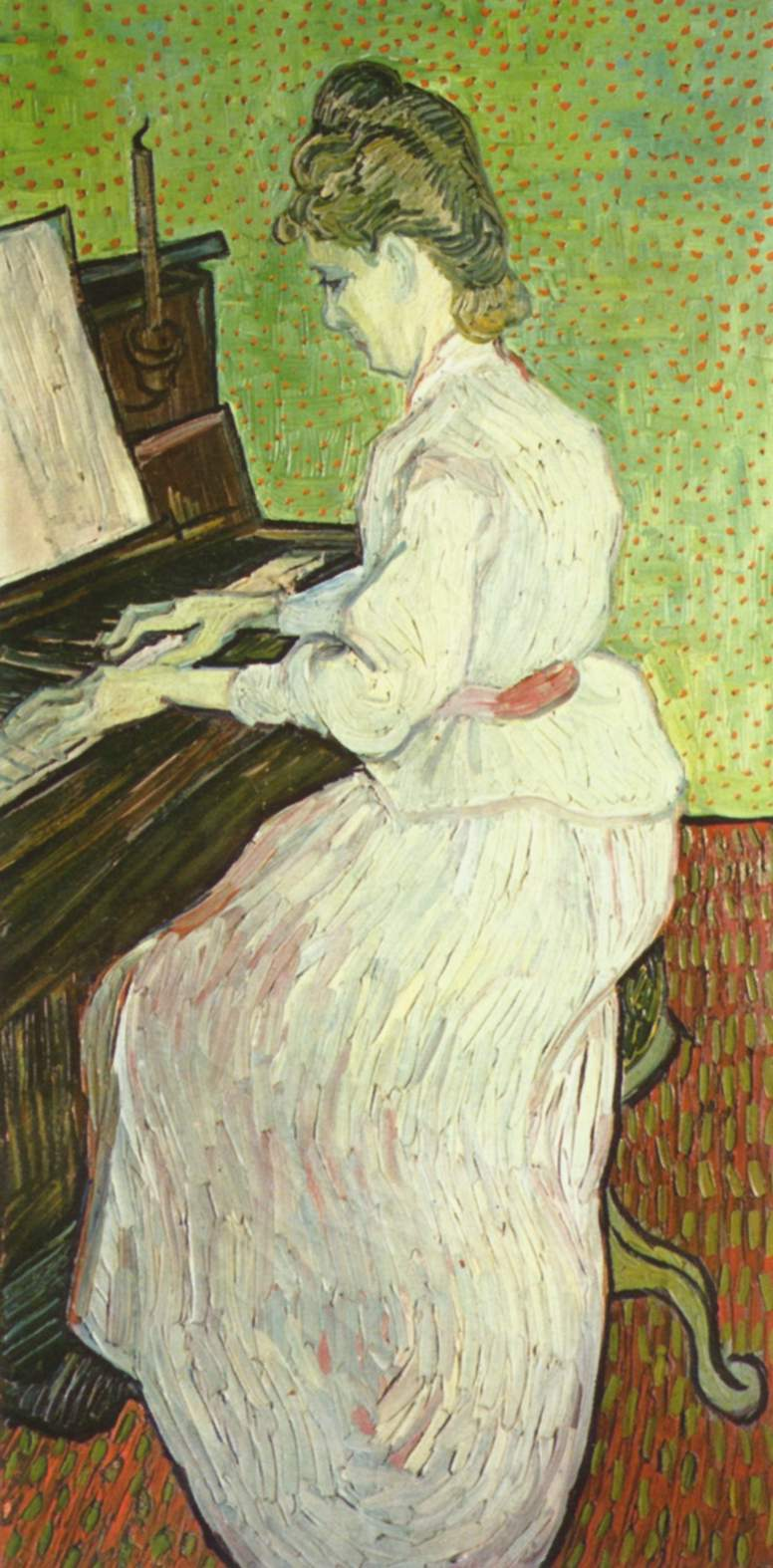
Mademoiselle Gachet at the Piano, 1890, Kunstmuseum Basel

Vincent van Gogh used double-squares almost exclusively during the final weeks of his life in Auvers, in June and July 1890. To arrive at this size, Van Gogh combined the legs of two standard sizes: the 50 cm leg from a size 12 and the 100 cm leg of a size 40 stretcher. The result was a double-square of 50 cm × 100 cm (20 in × 39 in), and from this size, easily the square could be derived by using two 50 cm legs. His choice of this size points into another direction from previous artists; his double-squares can easily be combined with size 30 canvases to more elaborated décorations, and his squares extend these possibilities.

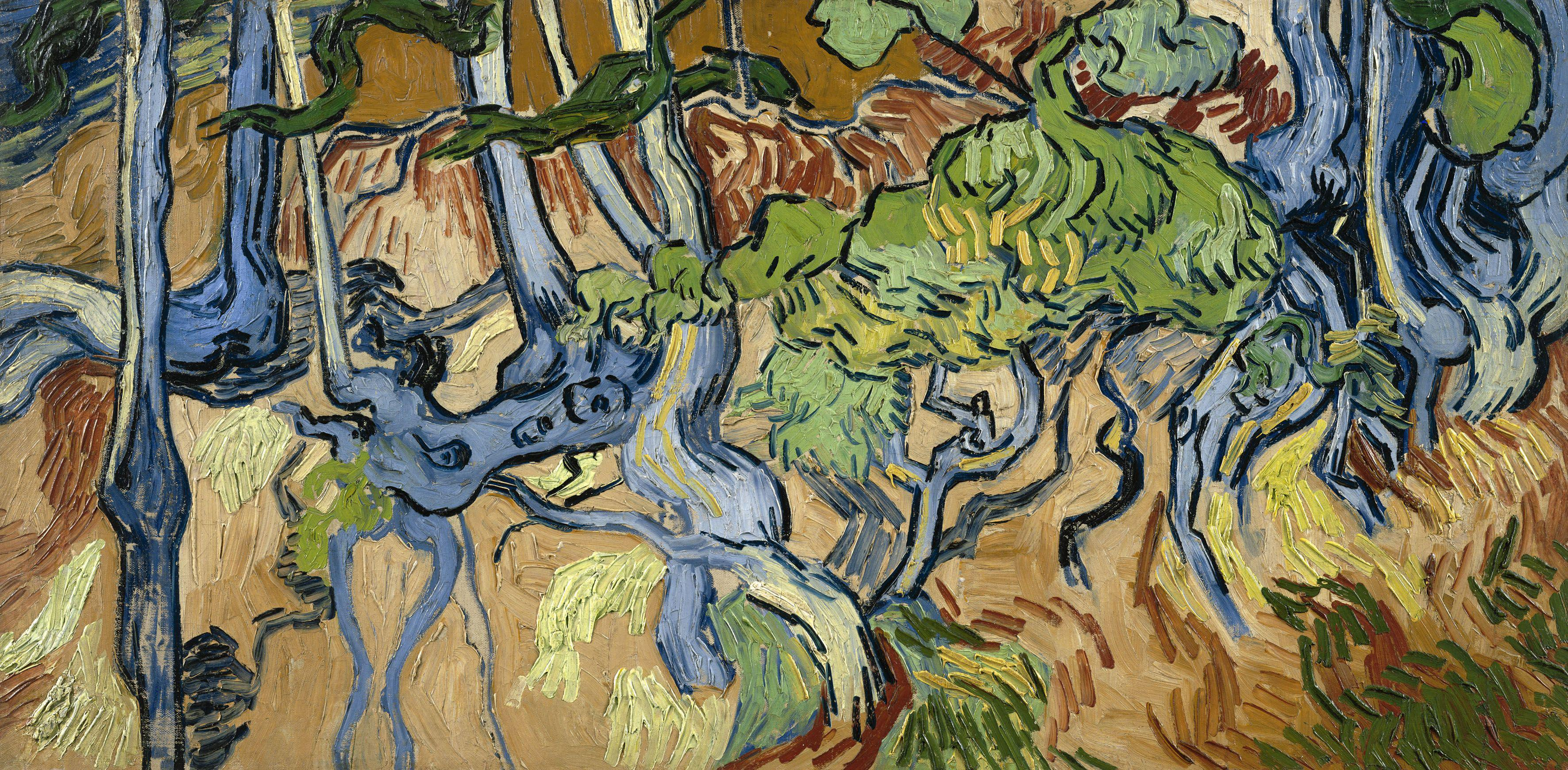
Tree Roots, July, 1890, Van Gogh Museum, Amsterdam (F816, JH2113)

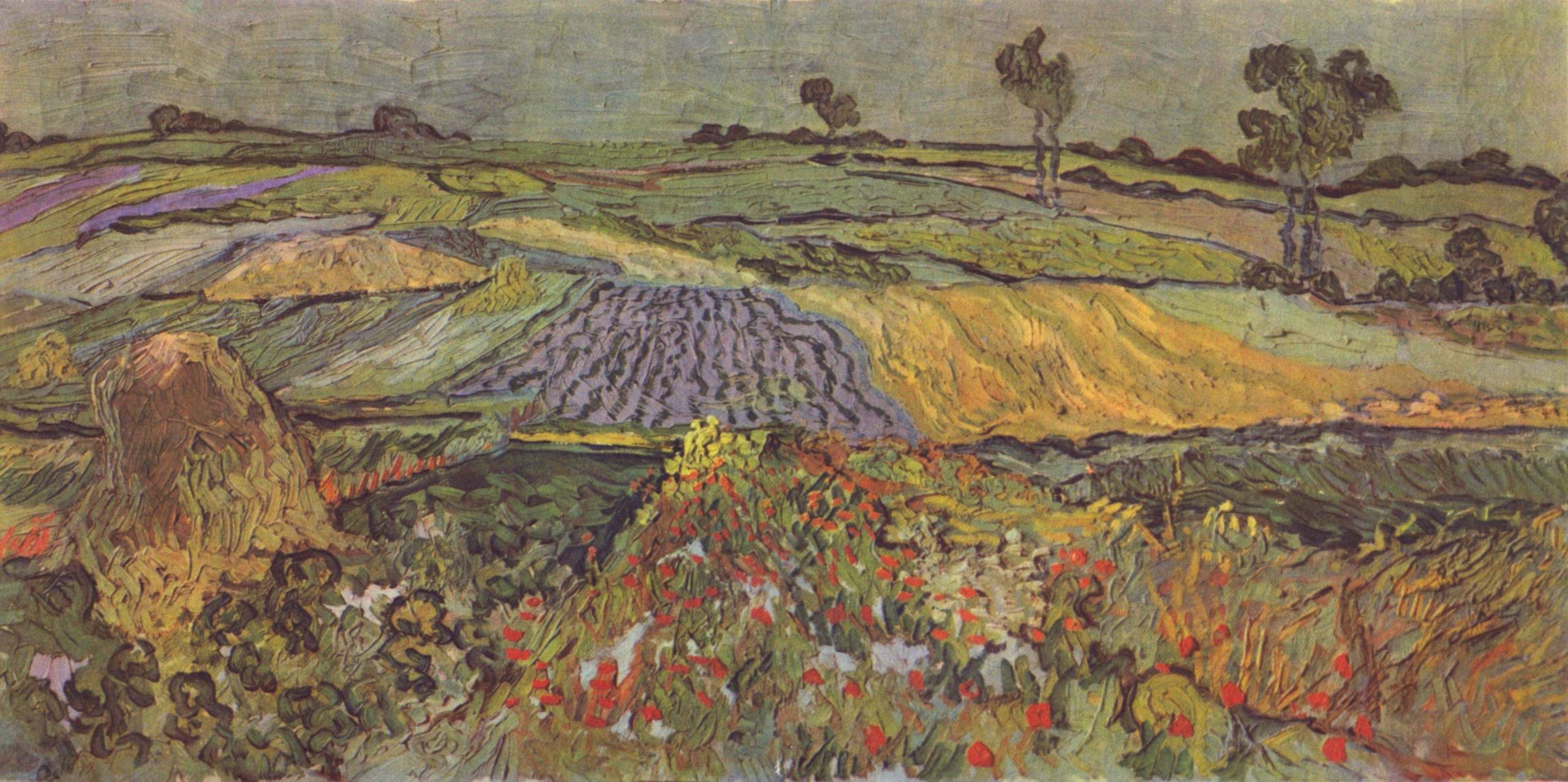
Wheat Fields near Auvers, June–July 1890, Österreichische Galerie Belvedere, Vienna

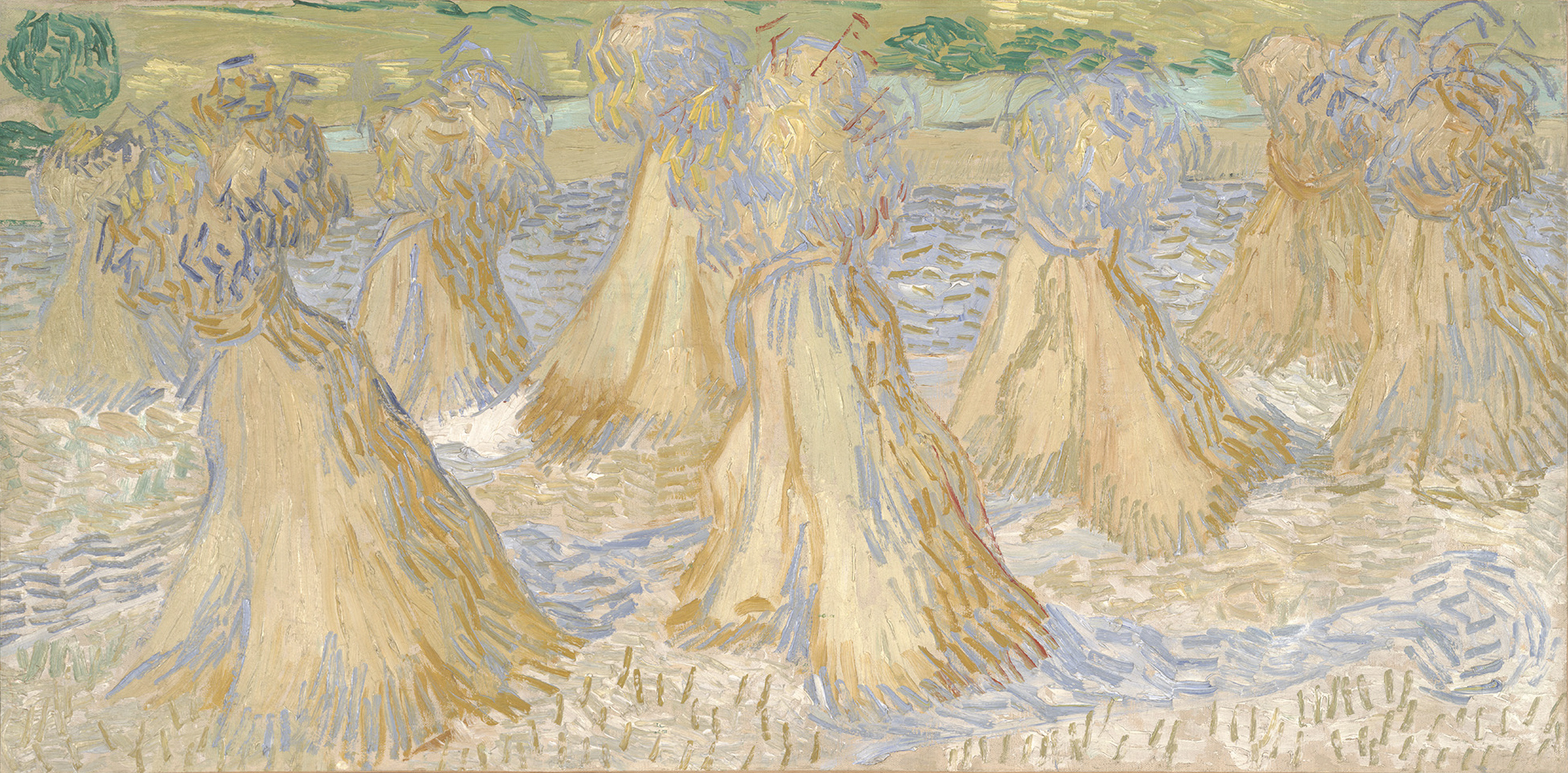
Sheaves of Wheat, 1890, Dallas Museum of Art (F771)

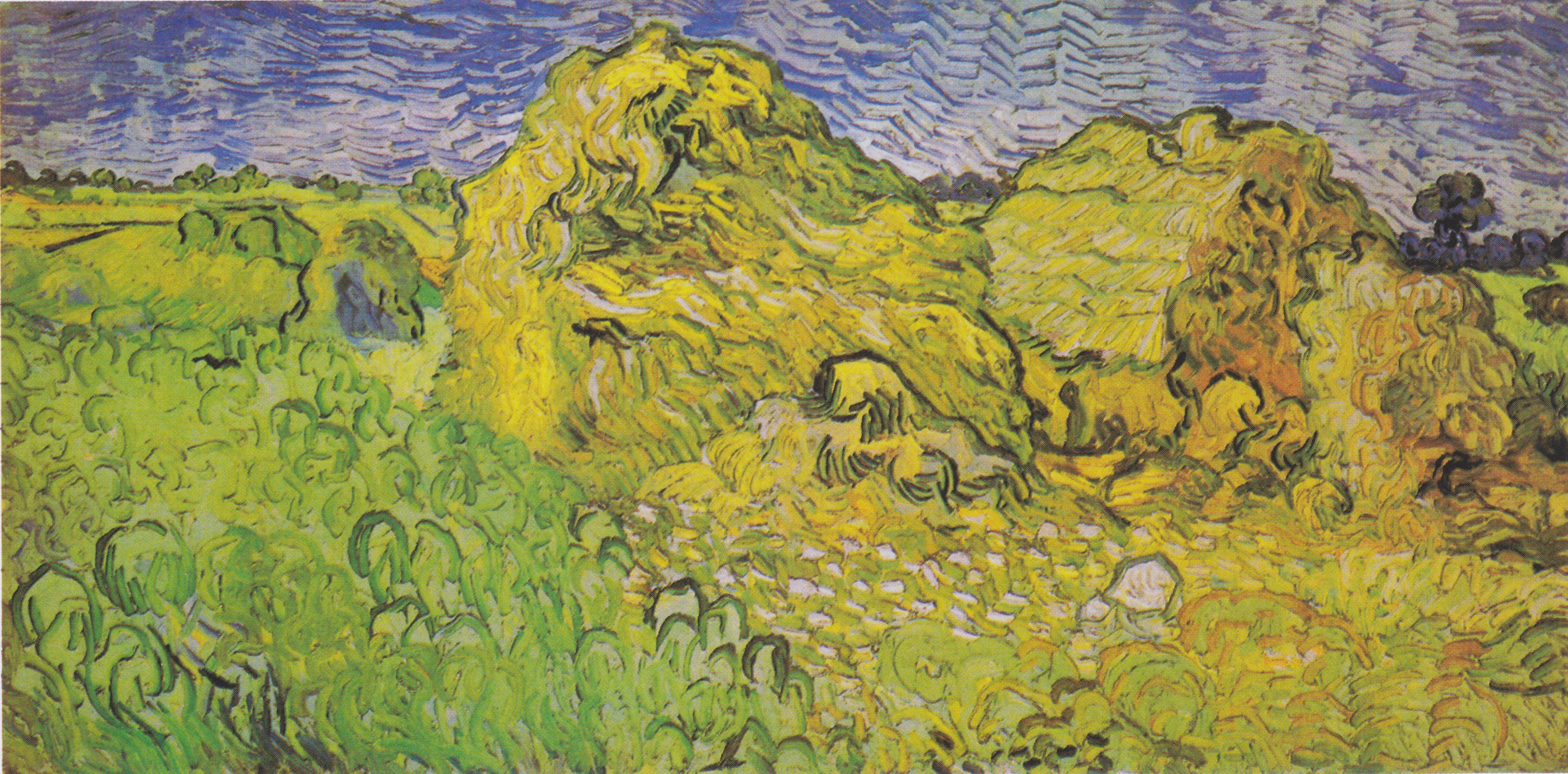
Field with Stacks of Grain, July 1890, Beyeler Foundation, Riehen, Switzerland (F809)

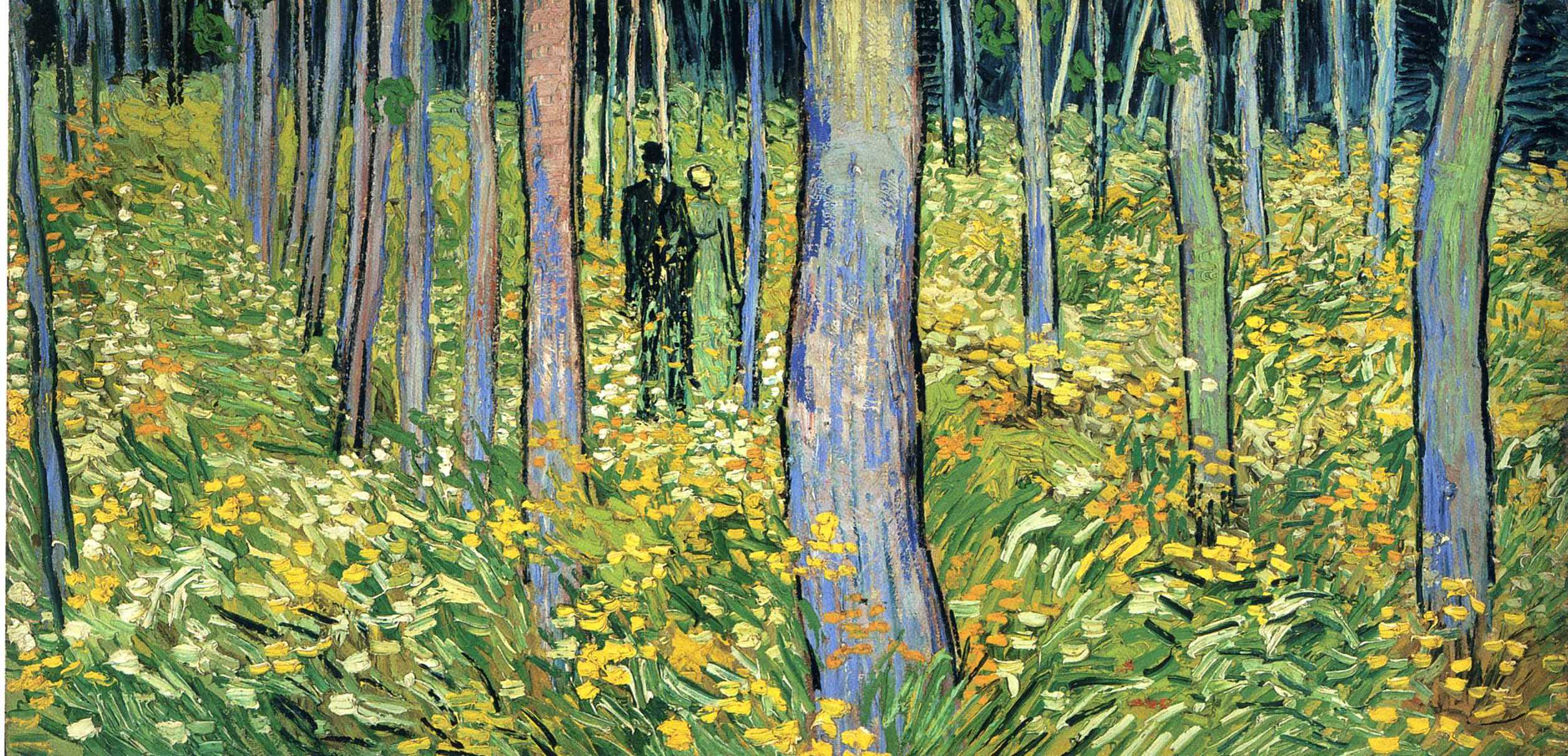
Undergrowth with Two Figures, June 1890, Cincinnati Museum of Art

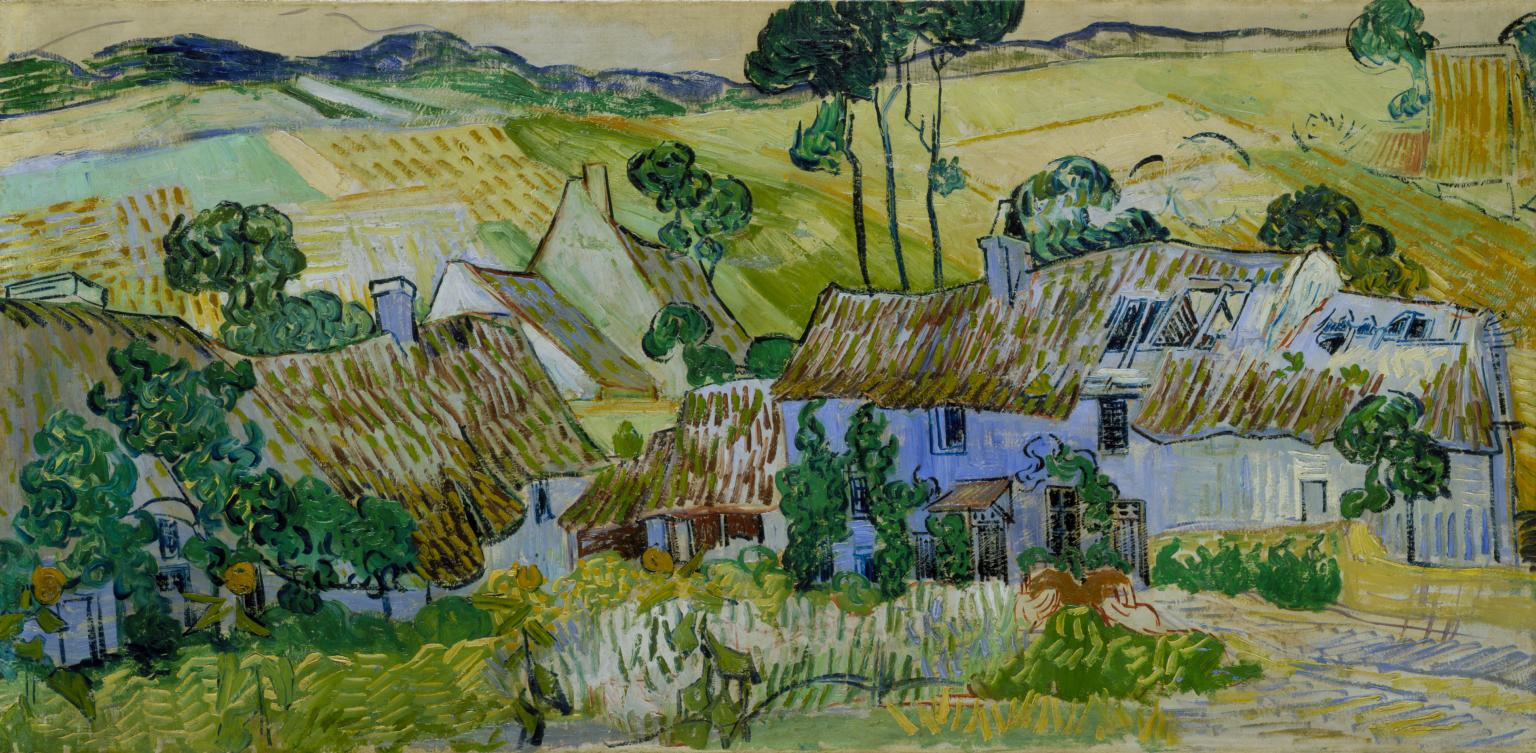
Thatched Cottages by a Hill, July 1890, Tate Gallery, London (F 793, JH 2114)

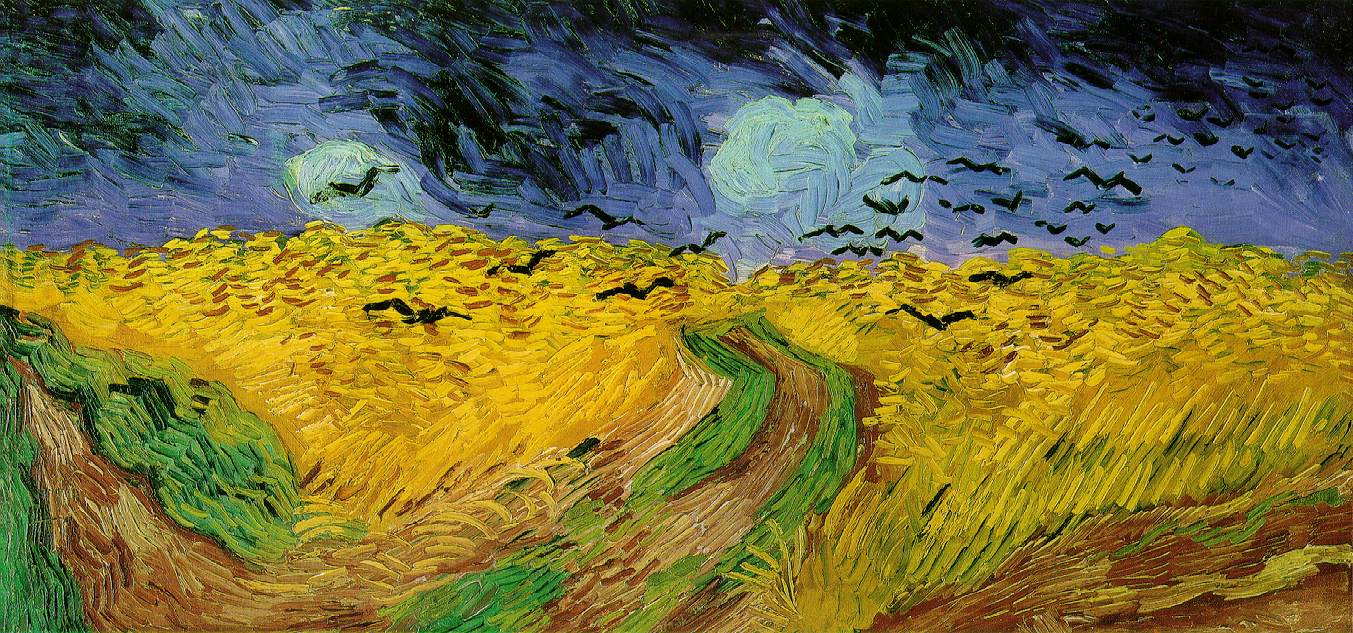
Wheat Field with Crows, 1890, Van Gogh Museum, Amsterdam

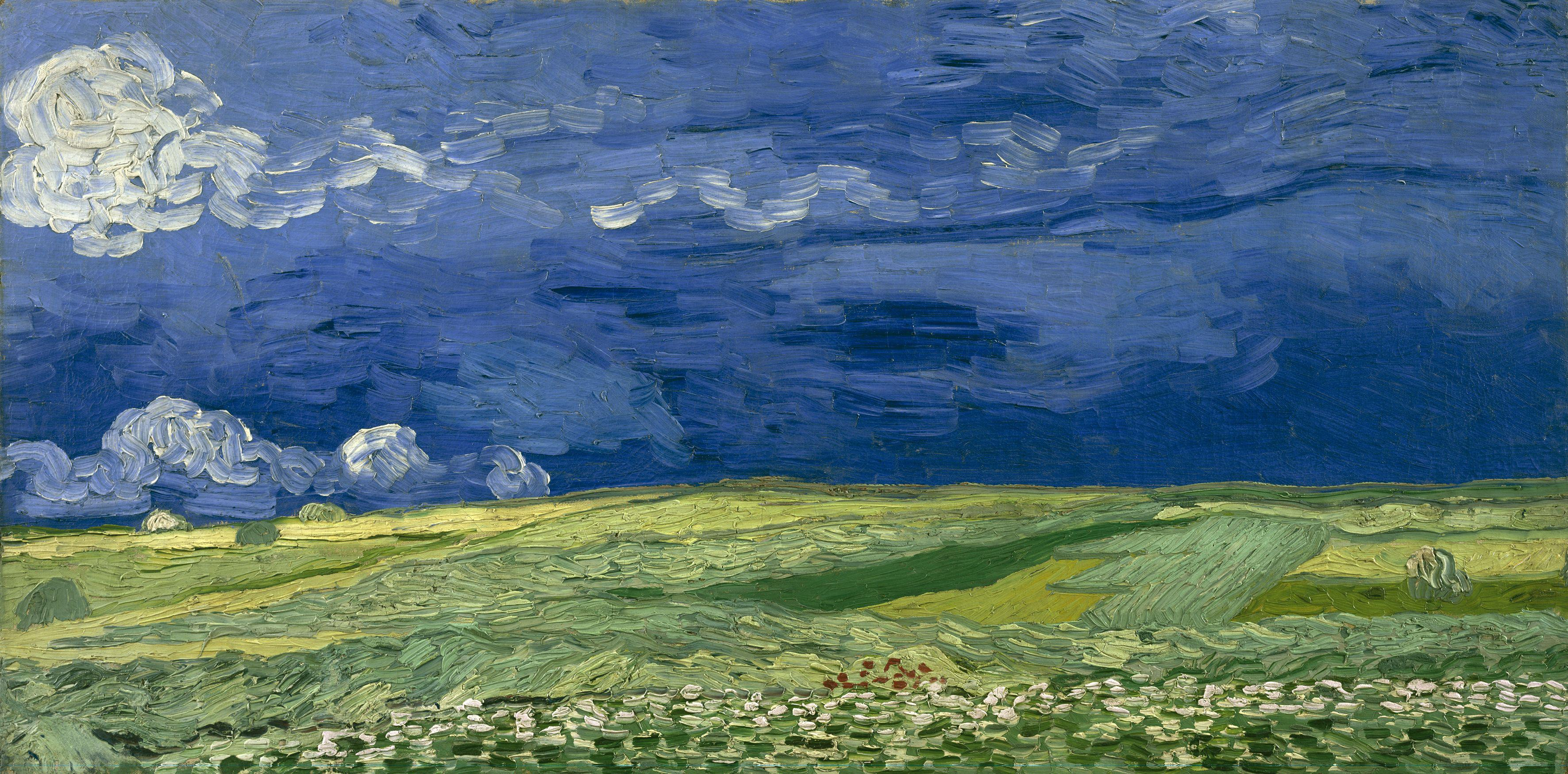
Wheatfield Under Thunderclouds, July 1890, Van Gogh Museum, Amsterdam

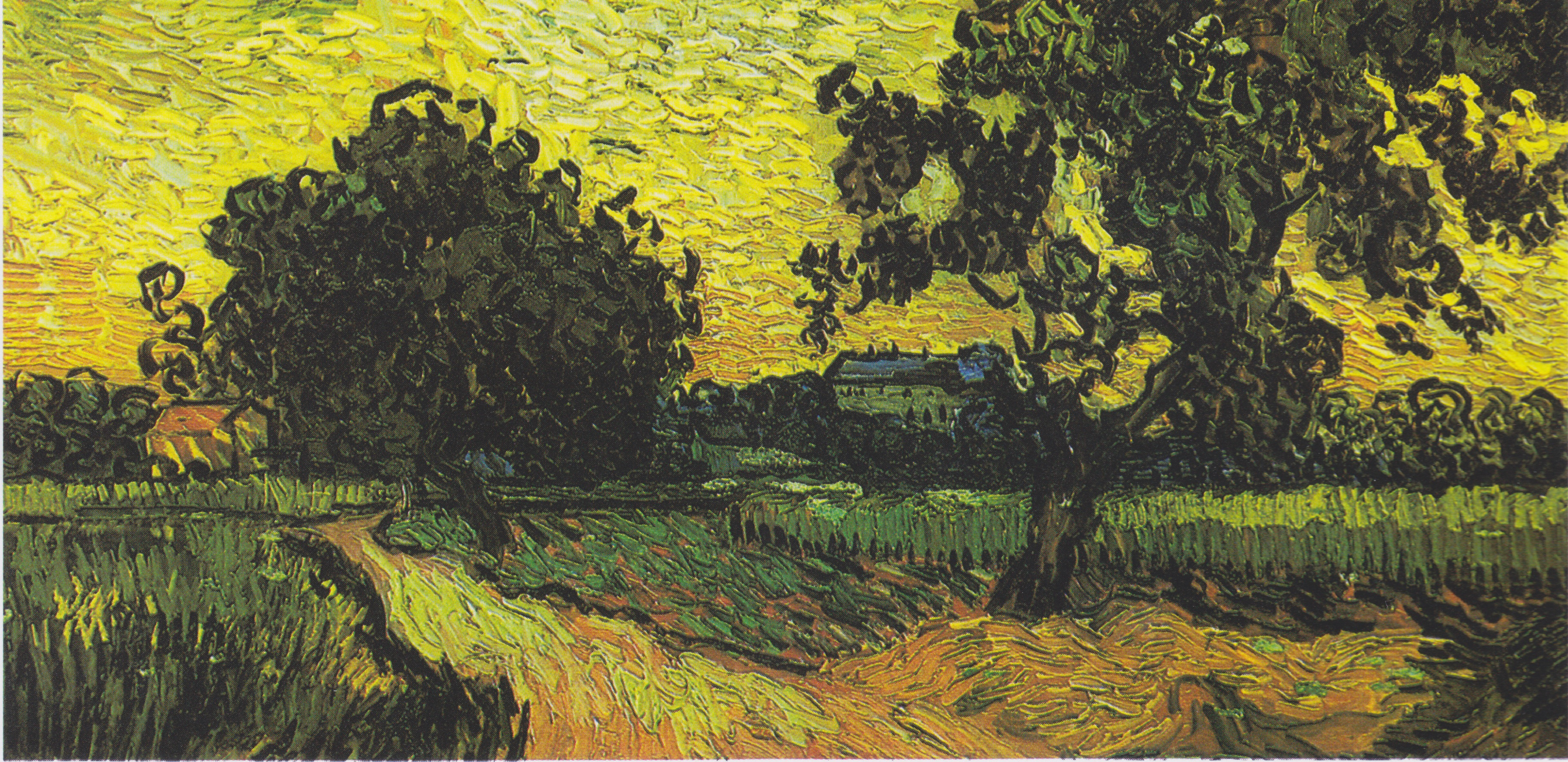
Landscape at Twilight or Landscape with Castle Auvers at Sunset, June 1890, Van Gogh Museum, Amsterdam (F770)

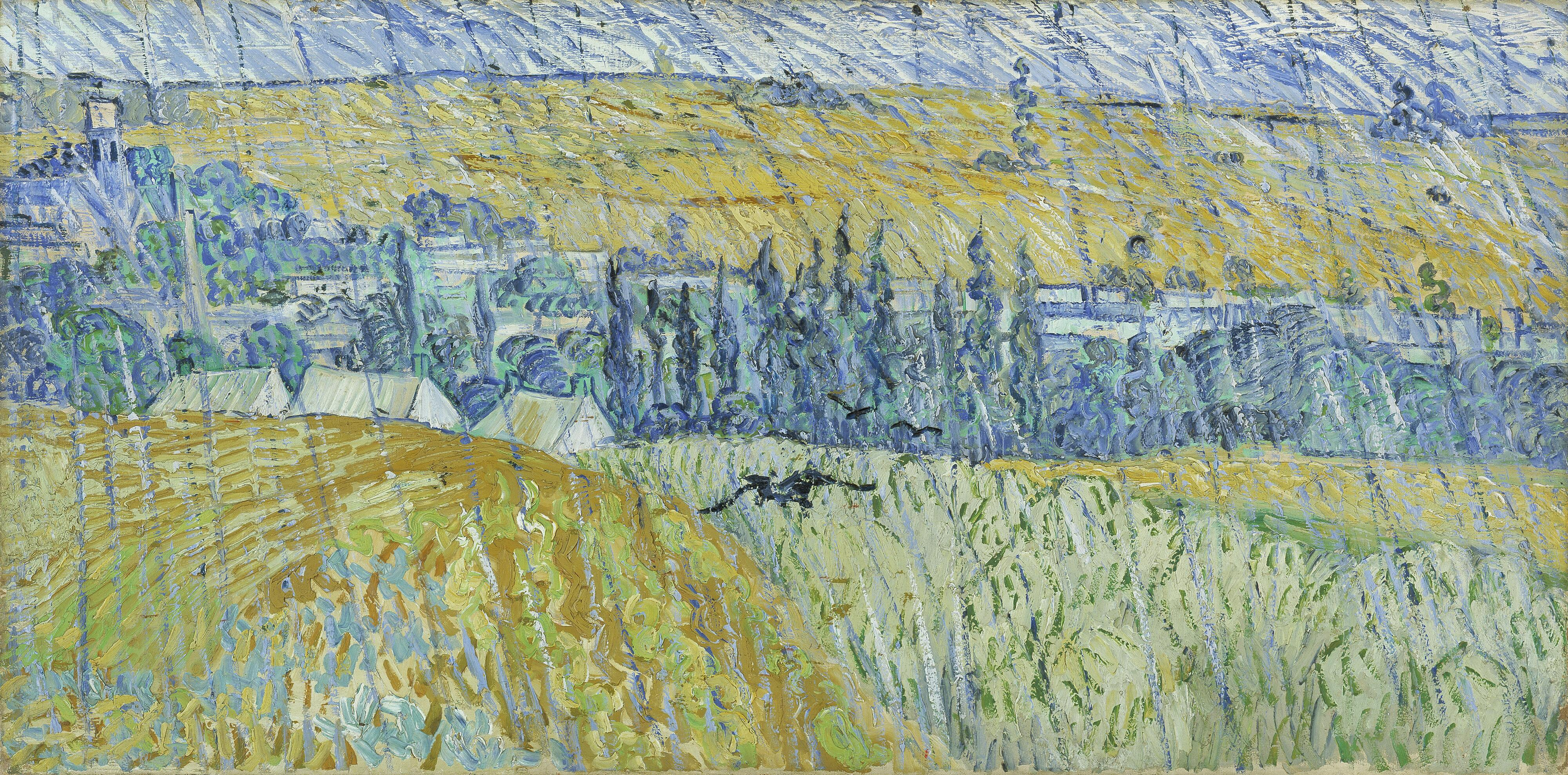
Landscape at Auvers in the Rain, July 1890, National Museum Cardiff, Wales

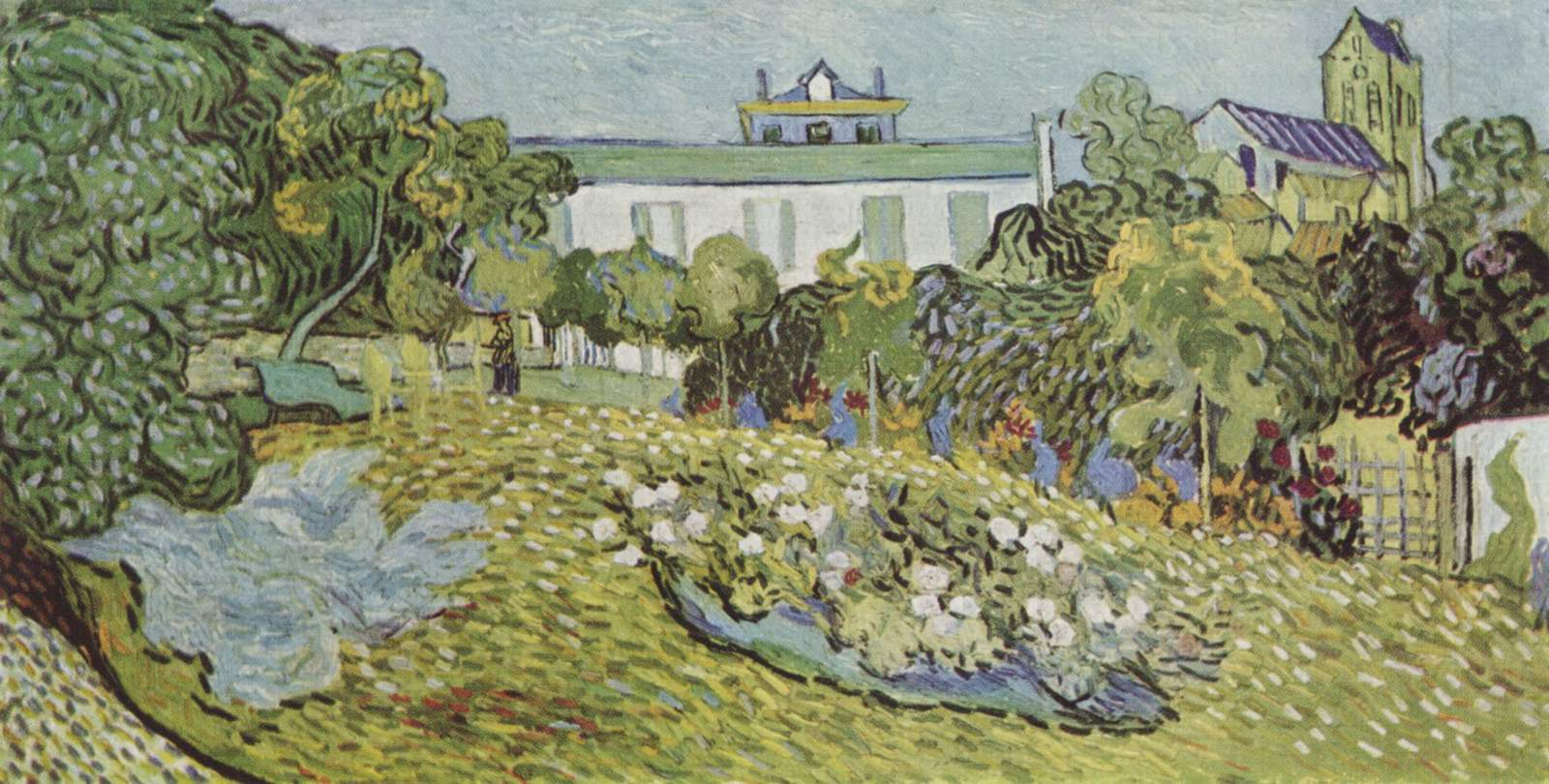
Daubigny's Garden, 1890, Hiroshima Museum of Art, Hiroshima

=== Subsequent uses of the dimensions ===
Ivon Hitchens worked primarily in double-squares at certain periods in his career.

== See also ==
- List of works by Vincent van Gogh
