= Anne-Katrin Purkiss =

German photographer

Anne-Katrin Purkiss (born in Chemnitz, Karl-Marx-Stadt, East Germany, 1959) is a German photographer. She moved to Britain in 1984, after graduating from University of Leipzig in 1983. Her father Joachim Seyffarth (1928–2014) was a German curator of monuments and photographer.

Her Sculptors project documented sculptors in their working environment and includes portraits of Dame Elisabeth Frink, Kenneth Armitage, Andy Goldsworthy, Sir Anthony Caro and Lynn Chadwick.

Photographs from her collection of her portraits of British scientists was shown in exhibitions at the Royal Society and the National Portrait Gallery, London including portraits of Sir Alec Jeffreys, Lord Darzi, Sir Martin Evans, Sir Tim Hunt and Dame Louise Johnson.

She compiled photographic records of the restoration of the Watts Gallery in Compton, Surrey, between 2008 and 2011, J.M.W. Turner’s House Sandycombe Lodge in Twickenham, London, from 2016 to 2017 and Gainsborough's House in Sudbury, Suffolk, from 2014 to 2022.

Her early work includes a large number of photographs of her childhood and youth in the GDR (East Germany) which is catalogued in the Deutsche Nationalbibliothek (German National Library).

She works primarily in black-and-white, using available light and Hasselblad.

== Works in public collections ==
There are over 100 photographic portraits by Purkiss in the National Portrait Gallery collection including portraits of Denis Thatcher, Enoch Powell, Simon Rattle and Georg Solti. Her work is also held in the collections of the Royal Academy of Arts, the Royal Society, London, the Henry Moore Institute, Leeds, the New Hall Art Collection, University of Cambridge, the Ingram Collection, in the archive of TATE, the National Art Library, the library of Yale Centre for British Art, Pallant House Gallery, Walsall Art Gallery and the Royal College of Art.

== Publications ==
Local Faces (2001) Orleans House Gallery (with introductions by Bamber Gascoigne and Terence Pepper) ISBN 1-902643-03-8
Sculptors 1986-2007 (2007) Orleans House Gallery ISBN 978-1-4276-2471-0 (with an introduction by Victoria Worsley, Henry Moore Institute)
Images of the GDR akg-images (Berlin–London–Paris) (2009) ISBN 978-1-4276-4085-7
Scientists 1985-2010 (2010) ISBN 978-1-4276-4815-0
Artists at Home and at Work (2015) The Gainsborough's House Society ISBN 978-0-946511-60-0
Faces of the South Downs - Portraits of a Landscape (2015) Miriquidi Books ISBN 978-0-9934111-0-6
Sculptors 1986-2016 (2017) Miriquidi Books ISBN 978-0-9934111-2-0; foreword by Peter Murray (Yorkshire Sculpture Park) and Adrian Glew, archivist at Tate Gallery
Anthony Eyton - Studio pictures (2017) Miriquidi Books ISBN 978-0-9934111-4-4
Creative Connections – Portraits of Women Scientists and Artists (2019), Murray Edwards College, University of Cambridge ISBN 978-1-9997131-0-2
Sculptors at Work (2021) F.E.McWilliam Gallery & Studio ISBN 978-1-908455-26-0
Gainsborough’s House – Reviving an Artist’s Birthplace (2023) Gainsborough’s House Society ISBN 978-0-946511-66-2
Faces of the South Downs - Portraits in a Landscape (2025) Miriquidi Books ISBN 978-0-993411-17-5

== Illustrations to publications ==
- Oxford Dictionary of National Biography, (current edition)
- Poland – European Tiger, Euromoney Books 1993 ISBN 1-85564-331-6
- Finland – A Coming of Age, Euromoney Books, 1996 ISBN 1-85564-437-1
- The lost Palace of Whitehall, RIBA, 1998 ISBN 1-872911-90-0
- Postman's Park: G. F. Watts's Memorial to Heroic Self-Sacrifice Watts Gallery, 2008 ISBN 978-0-9561022-1-8
- Watts Chapel: A Guide to the Symbols of Mary Watts's Arts and Crafts Masterpiece, Philip Wilson Publishers, 2010, ISBN 978-0-85667-692-5
- An Artists’ Village, Philip Wilson Publishers, 2011, ISBN 978-0-85667-696-3
- Paolo Cavinato – Constellation, Royal British Society of Sculptors, 2011 ISBN 978-0-9521592-5-4
- SKULPTUR, Hatje Cantz, 2015 ISBN 978-3-7757-4043-2
- Secrets of the High Woods, South Downs National Park Authority, 2016 ISBN 978-1-5272-0302-0
- Sculpture Shock - Site-specific interventions, Black Dog Publishing, 2016 ISBN 978-1911164180
- J.M.W. Turner’s House - The conservation of Sandycombe Lodge in Twickenham, 2016/17, Turner’s House Trust, 2017 ISBN 978-1-5272-1324-1
- John Hitchens - Aspects of Landscape, Sansom & Company, Bristol 2020 ISBN 9781911408505
- Diana Armfield: A Lyrical Eye, Paul Holberton Publishing 2021 ISBN 978-1-913645-07-6
- CONVERGENCE – Paintings by John Hitchens, Felix & Spear, London, 2022 ISBN 978-1-7397528-0-4
- John Lyons Carnivalesque (2024), The Whitworth, ISBN 978-0-903261-82-1
- John Hitchens - Elements of Landscape, Sansom & Company, Bristol 2025 ISBN 978-1-915670-18-2

== Awards ==
- Wellcome Image Award 2009
- German Photobook Award 2024

== Portraits of Purkiss ==
The National Portrait Gallery collection has a 1994 print of Purkiss by Alan Symes.
