= Motcomb Street =

Street in Belgravia, London

Coordinates: 51°29′59″N 0°9′21.69″W

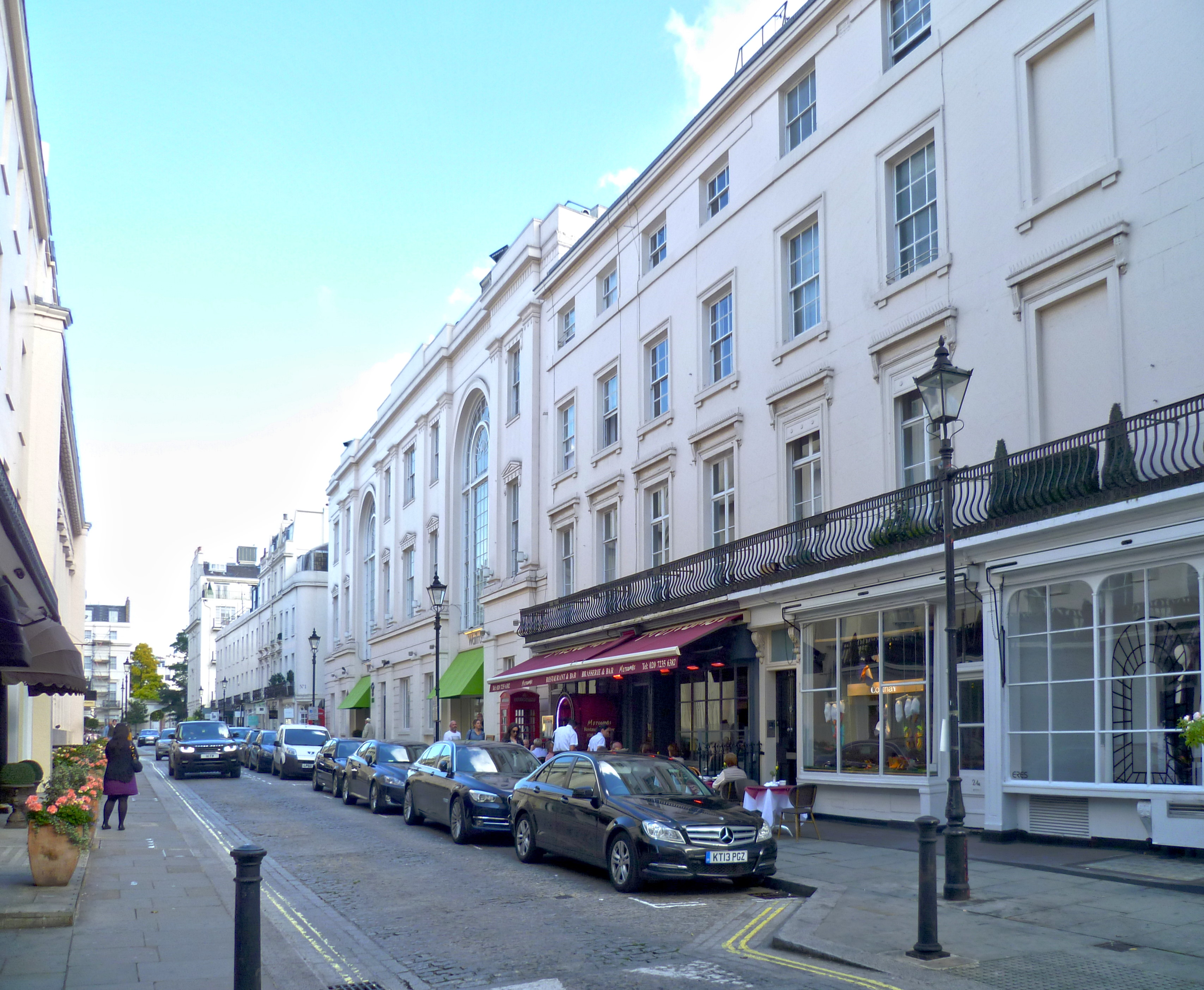
Motcomb Street looking east from Lowndes Street

Motcomb Street is a street in the City of Westminster's Belgravia district in London. It is known for its luxury fashion shops, such as Christian Louboutin shoes, Stewart Parvin gowns, and the jeweller Carolina Bucci, and location of the Greek revival Pantechnicon building, formerly the Sotheby's Belgravia auction rooms and furniture store.

The street runs south-west to north-east from Lowndes Street to a junction with Wilton Terrace, Wilton Crescent, and Belgrave Mews North. Kinnerton Street joins it on the north side and Halkin Mews is on the south side.

== 19th century ==
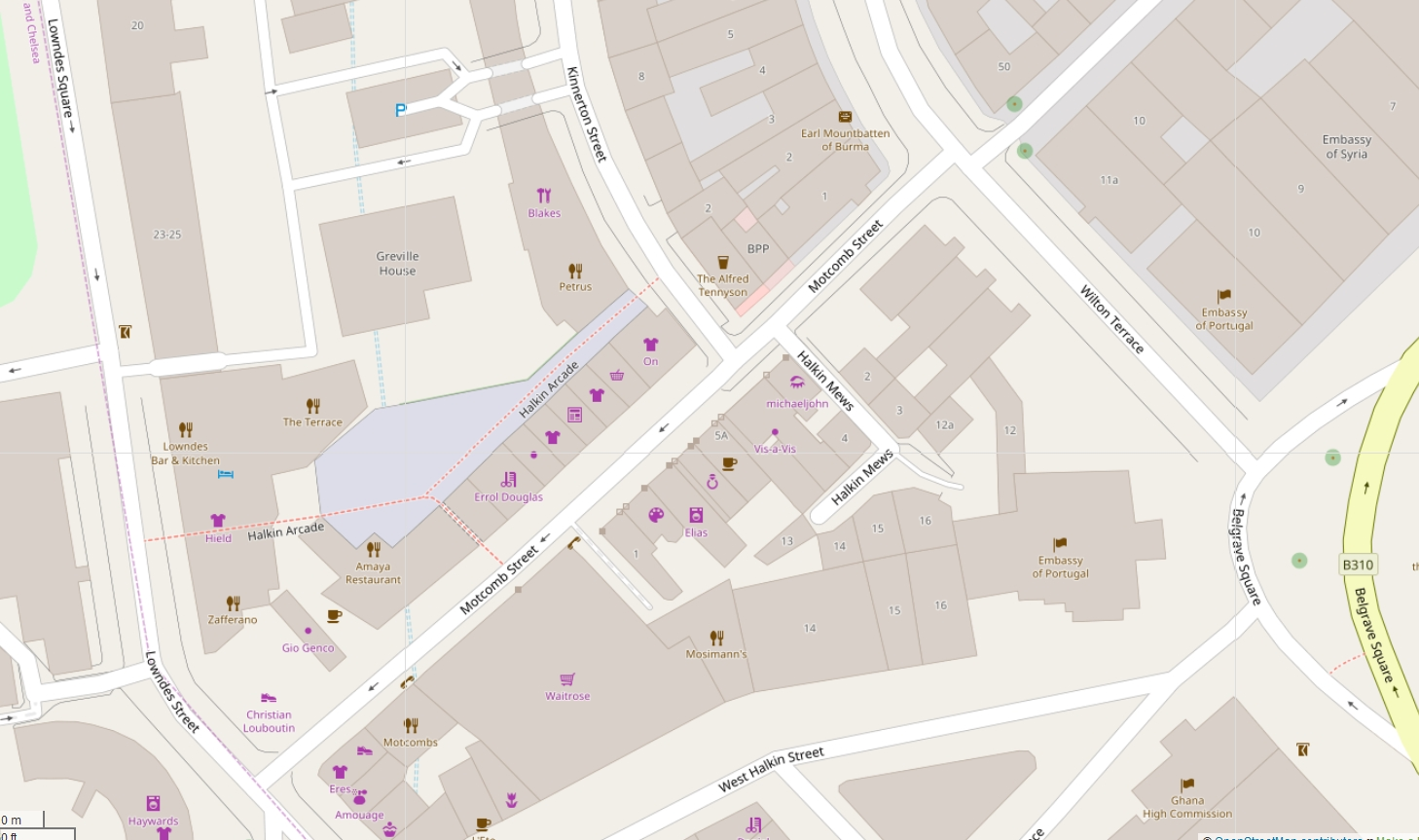
Motcomb Street area map

The street first appeared on a map in the 1830s, and was originally called Kinnerton Mews, but soon became Motcomb Street. Although built as houses, many soon became shops, and by 1854 included cow keepers, bakers and grocers, and Richard Gunter had his confectionery shop there at the corner with Lowndes Street.

It was the location of the original Pantechnicon, a large building designed by Joseph Jobling and constructed by Seth Smith in 1834 as a bazaar or department store, mainly for the sale of carriages and household furniture and which covered two acres, bounded by Lowndes Street and Kinnerton Street. It was destroyed by fire in 1874, and rebuilt behind the facade, which was all that remained.

== 20th century and later ==
In 1986, Thea Porter had a short business partnership with Princess Dina of Jordan in a smaller shop, Arabesque, on Motcomb Street. Zandra Rhodes has stated, "Sadly, one didn't hear of her after that".

The first Jimmy Choo shoe store was opened in 1996 on Motcomb Street. Christian Louboutin opened his first shoe store at no. 23, and it is still trading there.

In 2015, it was announced that the Pantechnicon building would be redeveloped while maintaining its neo-classical façade.

In September 2017, following work to the street, it was reopened with a street party.

== Gallery ==
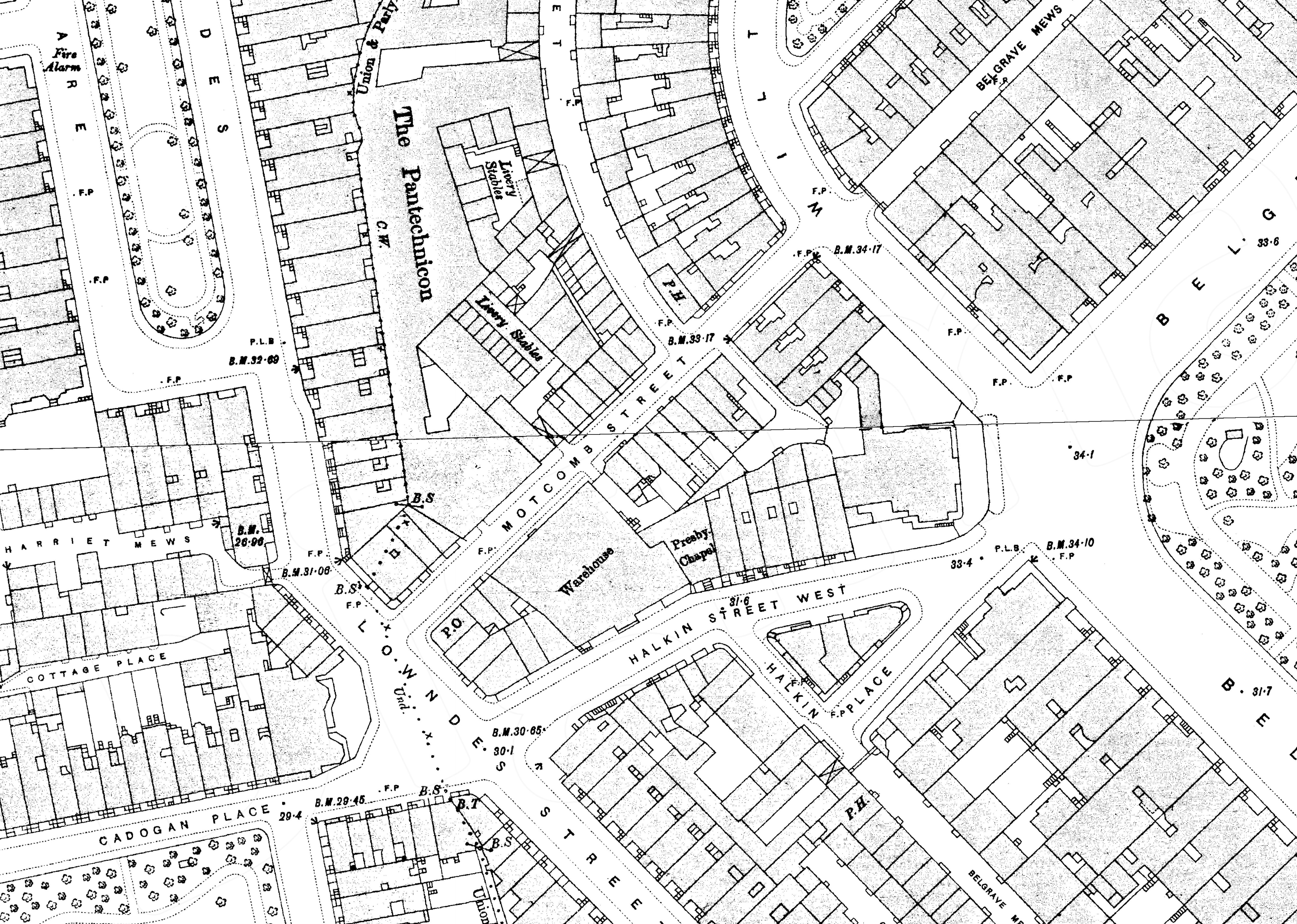
Motcombe Street on an 1895 Ordnance Survey map showing the Pantechnicon on the north side.
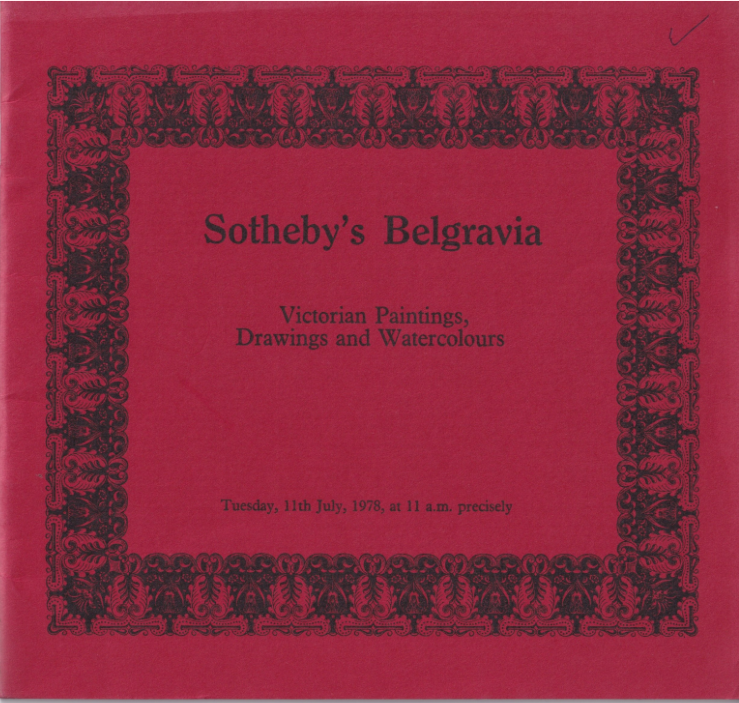
Sotheby's Belgravia, 19 Motcomb Street. Sale catalogue Victorian Paintings July 11, 1978

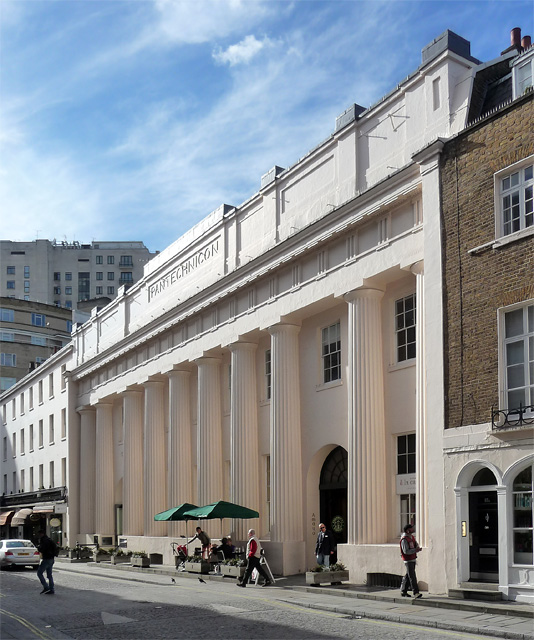
The Pantechnicon facade, north side

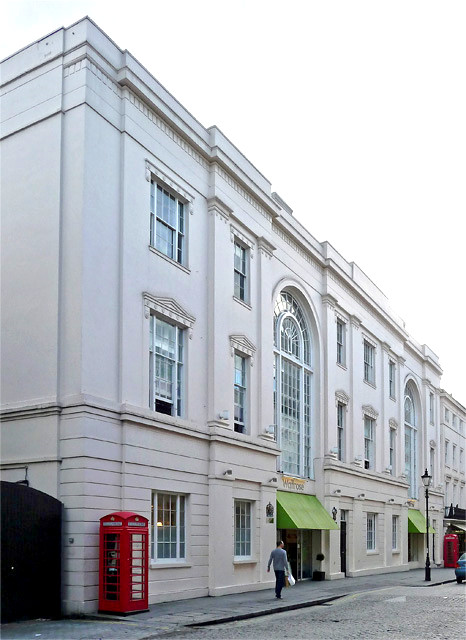
Halkin Arcade, south side
