= Alfred Hitchens =

English painter

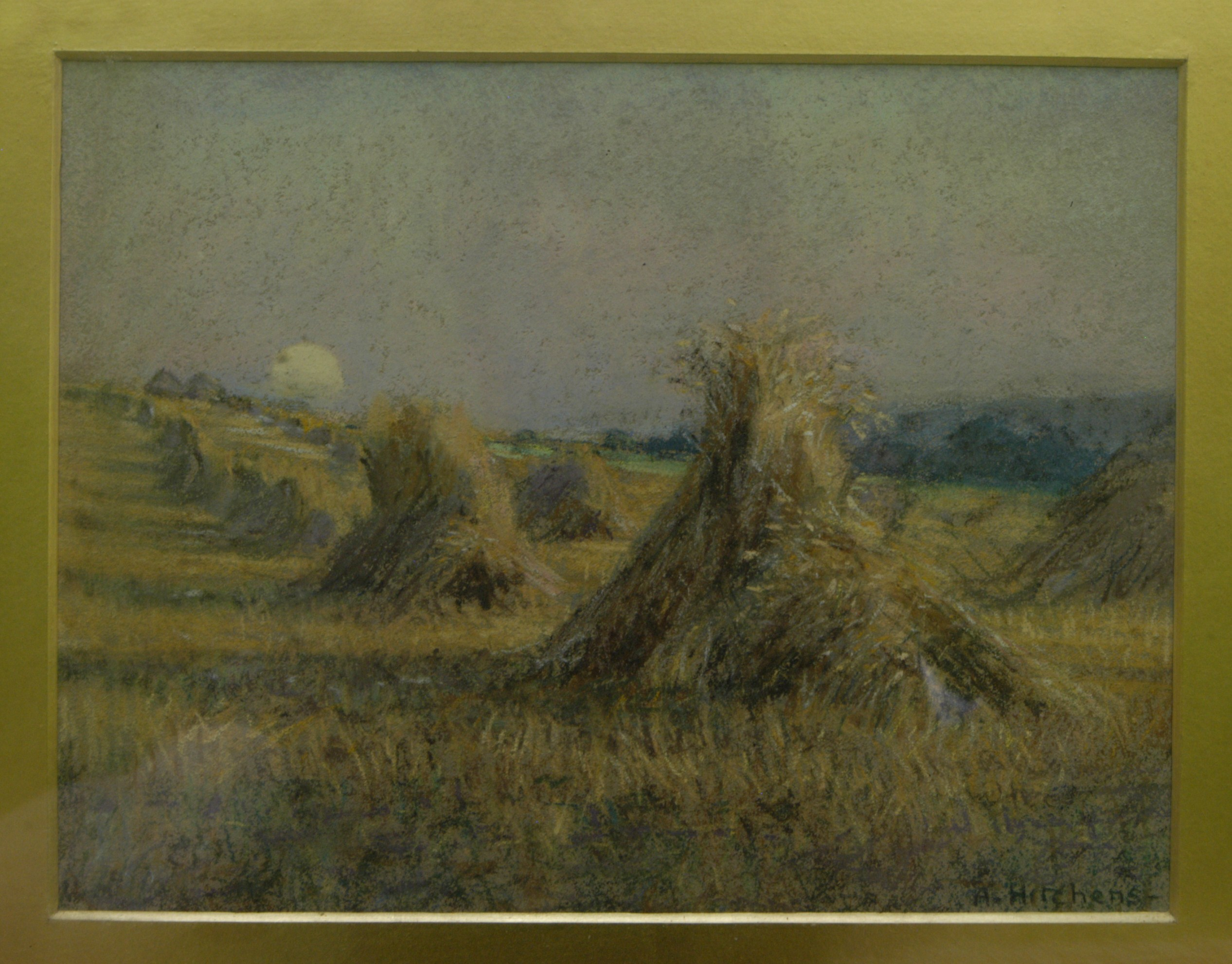
Harvest Scene by Alfred Hitchens

Alfred Hitchens (27 November 1861 – 5 October 1942) was an English painter, father, grandfather and great grandfather of artists Ivon Hitchens, John Hitchens and Simon Hitchens respectively. His work was regularly exhibited at the Royal Academy of Arts.

== Biography ==
Alfred Hitchens was born in Peckham Rye, Surrey (now London). He entered the South Kensington School of Art in 1877, followed by studies in Paris, at the Académie Julian and in Rome. He married Ethel Margareth Seth-Smith in 1887 and toured Italy and southern Germany. He gained early recognition, aged 21, at a National Competition of Schools of Art. The London Daily News reported: "among the gold medallists, the first prize for an oil painting from the nude having been gained by Mr Alfred Hitchens, a very young man".

After 1887, Hitchens came to exhibit regularly at the Royal Academy. His work is described in The Morning Post as: "a worthy recruit to the classic art is to be found in Mr Alfred Hitchens" and "his cleverly painted picture The Shadow of a Vow". More recently, in a biography of his son, Ivon Hitchens, his paintings of that period are characterised as "in the academic mainstream of the day ... Classical mythology alternating with the sentimentalised rustic realism of the school of Bastien-Lepage".

He exhibited regularly in pastels at Walker's Gallery and the Fine Art Society, London, in the early 1900s.

Hitchens was also noted as a portrait painter for work such as his "well-executed portrait of Mr George Hitchcock, the painter", or An Officer of the Machine Gun Corps, now at the National Army Museum.

He died at a nursing home in Midhurst, West Sussex. He was married to Ethel Margaret Seth-Smith, the sister of the architect William Howard Seth-Smith. Both his son Ivon Hitchens and his grandson John Hitchens followed his profession as painters. His great-grandson, Simon Hitchens, is a sculptor.

Exhibitions featuring work by Alfred Hitchens, Ivon Hitchens, John Hitchens and Simon Hitchens were held at Kevis House Gallery in Petworth in 2019, and at Southampton City Art Gallery in 2022–23.

== Work in public collections ==
His most widely known painting, The Legend of the Christmas Rose, is in the collection of the church of Montclair, near New York City, US. The model for the painting was his son, Ivon Hitchens. Work in the UK can be seen at the National Army Museum and at Southampton City Art Gallery.
