= Seth Smith (property developer) =

British property developer (1791–1860)

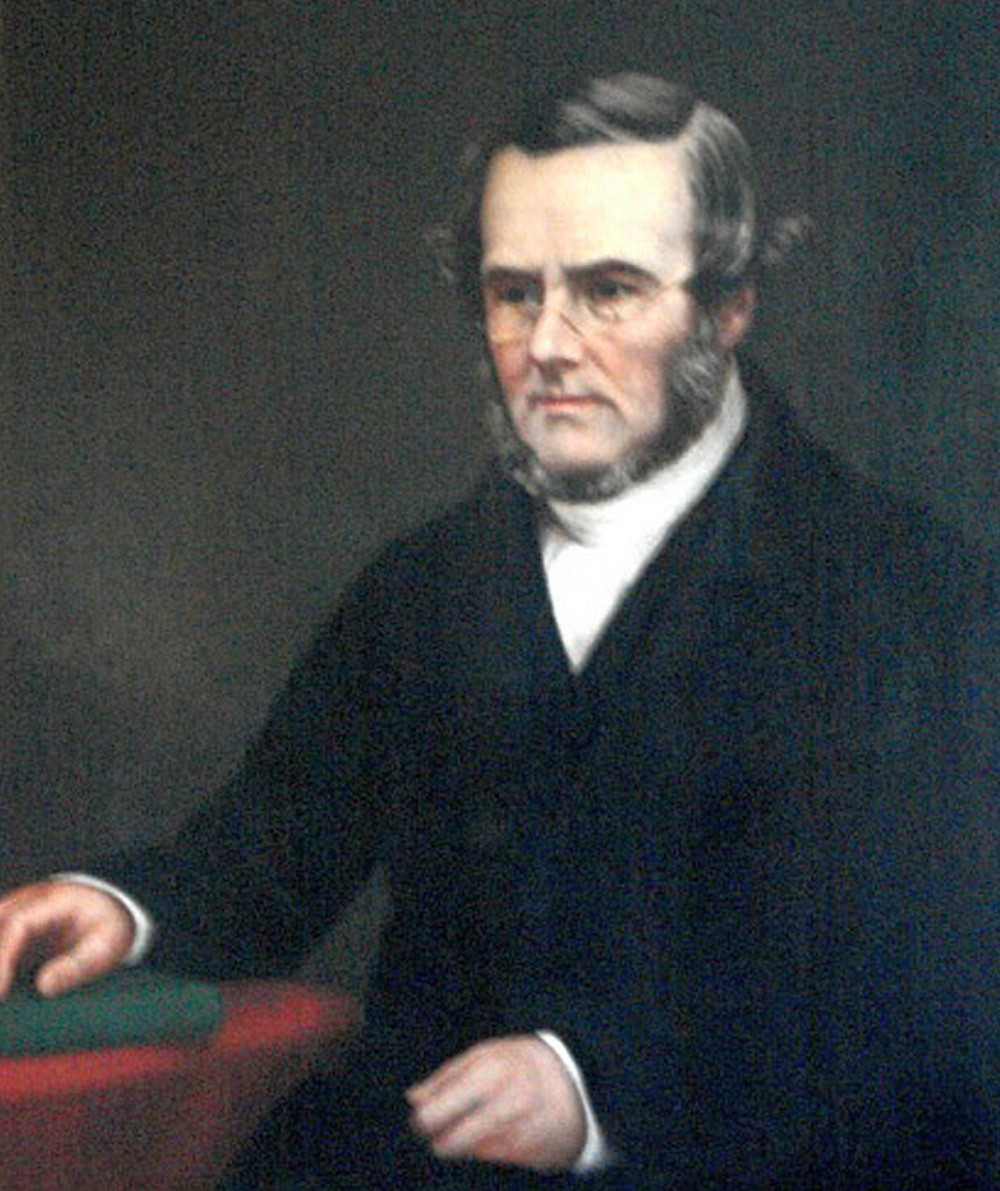
Seth Smith, 19th-century British property developer

Seth Smith (15 December 1791 – 18 June 1860) was a London property developer, who was responsible in the early part of the 19th century for developing large parts of the West End of London, including the Belgravia and Mayfair districts. Much of the West End in the 1820s was an undesirable, swampy, crime-infested area on the outskirts of the city, but Smith with Thomas Cubitt and the Cundy brothers, notably Thomas Cundy (junior), envisioned several large-scale development projects that transformed the West End into a thriving part of the city. Although most of Smith's buildings in the now affluent Mayfair district have since been demolished, many of his Belgravia buildings still stand including the pantechnicon from which the name of the van derives from. Smith made his home at Eaton Square in Belgravia, which was part of one of his development projects. He died on 18 June 1860 at the age of 68 in the St George Hanover Square parish of London, and he is buried in West Norwood Cemetery.

== Family ==
He was the son of Rev. Seth Smith, who was from Warminster, Wiltshire. He married Elizabeth, daughter of William Rose of Paddington, on 7 March 1815. One of his grandsons was David Seth-Smith, who was a well known zoologist, and another, William Howard Seth-Smith III, who was a noted architect. Also, his 3rd great-grandson is William Pleydell-Bouverie, 9th Earl of Radnor. Another 3rd great-grandson was Sir John Gilmour, 4th Baronet of Lundin & Montrave. One of his 4th great-grandsons is Richie McCaw who was captain of the New Zealand All Blacks.
