= Trees and Undergrowth =

Painting series by Vincent van Gogh

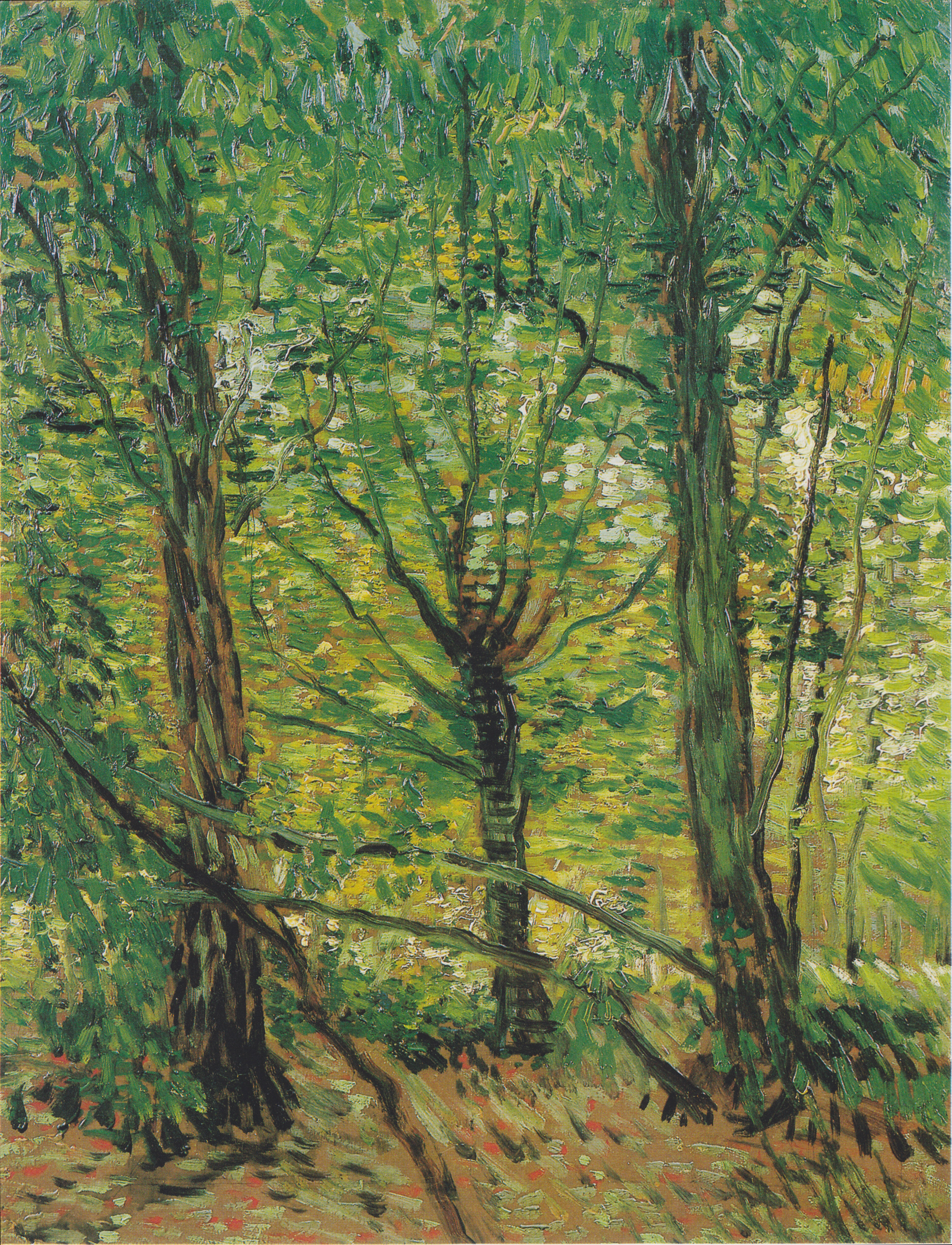
- Artist: Vincent van Gogh
- Year: 1887
- Catalogue: F307; JH1318
- Medium: oil on canvas
- Dimensions: 46 cm × 36 cm (18 in × 14 in)
- Location: Van Gogh Museum, Amsterdam, Netherland

Trees and Undergrowth is the subject of paintings that Vincent van Gogh made in Paris, Saint-Rémy and Auvers, from 1887 through 1890. Van Gogh made several paintings of undergrowth, a genre of painting known as sous-bois that was brought into prominence by artists of the Barbizon School and the early Impressionists. The works from this series successfully use shades of color and light in the forest or garden interior paintings. Van Gogh selected one of his Saint-Rémy paintings, Ivy (F609) for the Brussels Les XX exhibition in 1890.

== Sous-bois genre ==
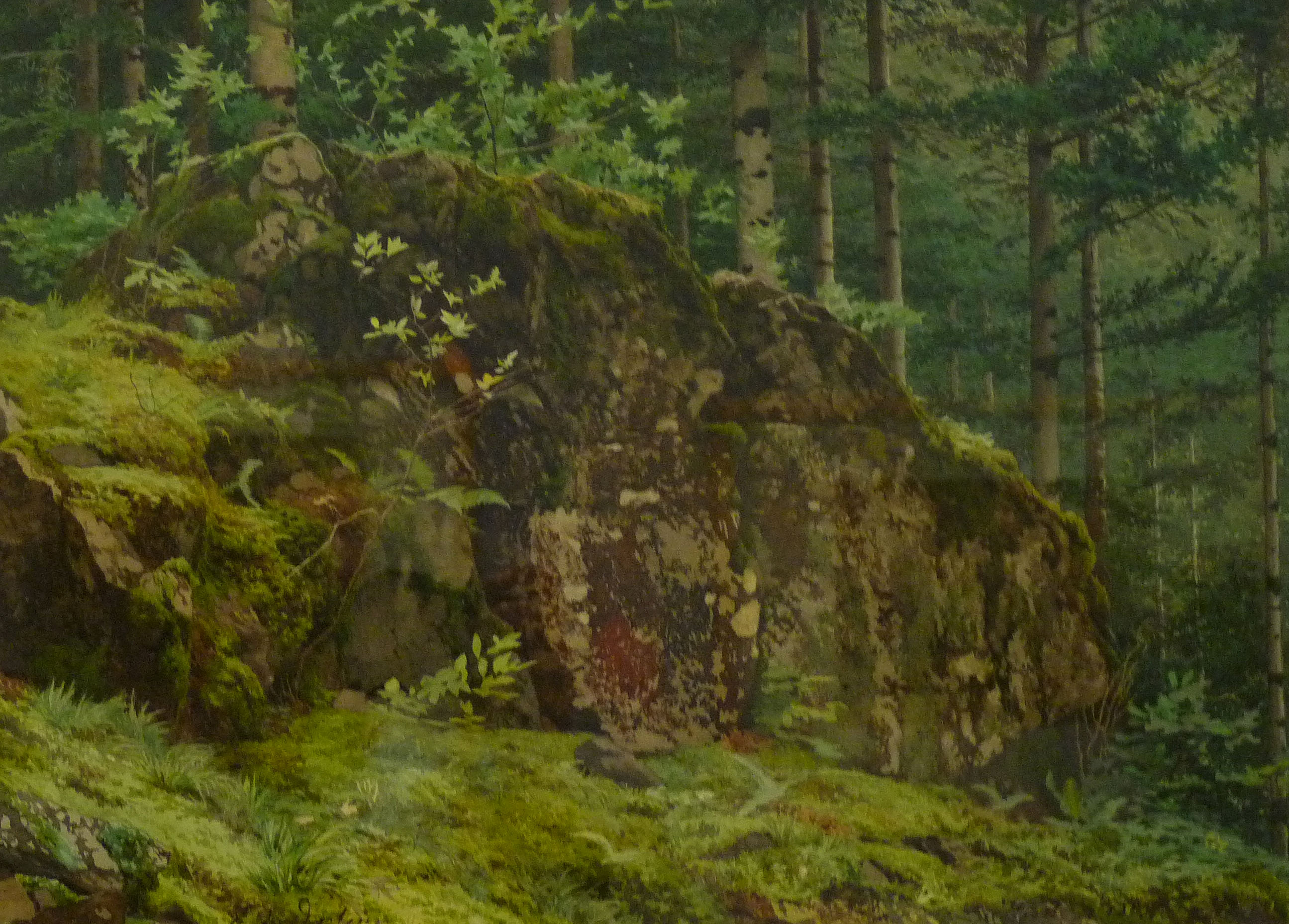
Marie-Ferdinand de Dartein, Sous-bois à Ottrott, 1875

The woodland scene genre, or "sous-bois" in French for undergrowth, was popular with artists from the Barbizon School and Impressionists.

Rather than painting landscapes from afar like traditional painters, 19th-century rural painters climbed or walked into forested areas for a close view of wooded scenes. Paintings of the sous-bois, evoking the trees and grassy undergrowth, were often made vertically on canvas, as opposed to horizontal views of sweeping landscapes. In a sous-bois, the sky is barely visible, just a glimpse of sky sometimes penetrating the branches. This type of composition was rare before the 19th century when artists of the Barbizon School made paintings of forested areas in the Fontainebleau region of France. Close to the subject of the painting, artists painting sous-bois capture their experience in the forested scene. In German, the painting of forest interiors was called Waldinneres, meaning enclosed woodland space.

== Paris ==
In Trees and Undergrowth (F309a) Van Gogh portrays the play of light falling through the trees to the low-lying plants in highlights of white, yellow and red. The effect of the light and shade produces many shades of green which van Gogh paints in short brushstrokes across the canvas. A horizon line is suggested by a line of yellow, suggesting a clearing beyond the cropping of trees and foliage.

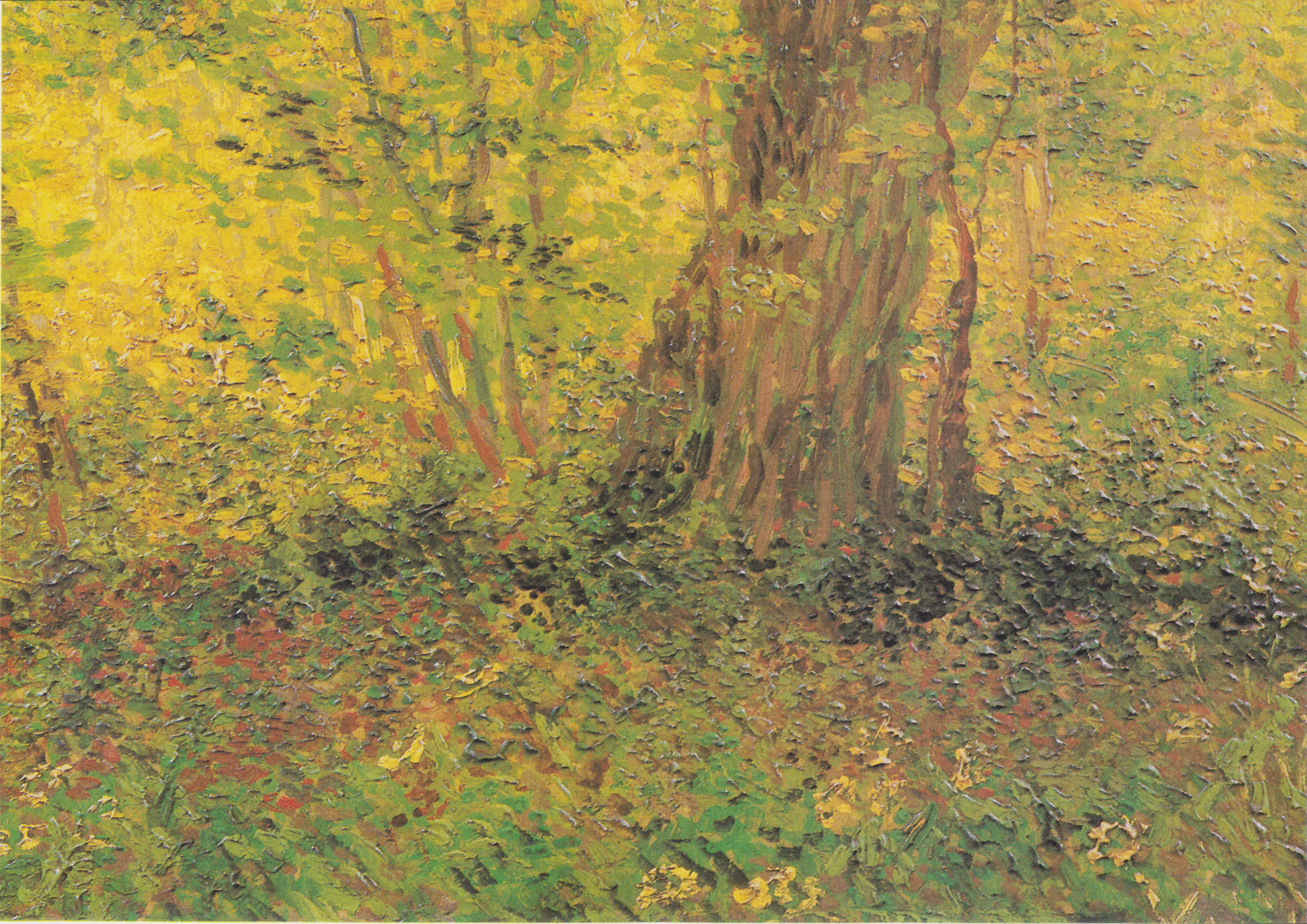
Undergrowth, 1887, Centraal Museum, Utrecht, Netherlands (F306)

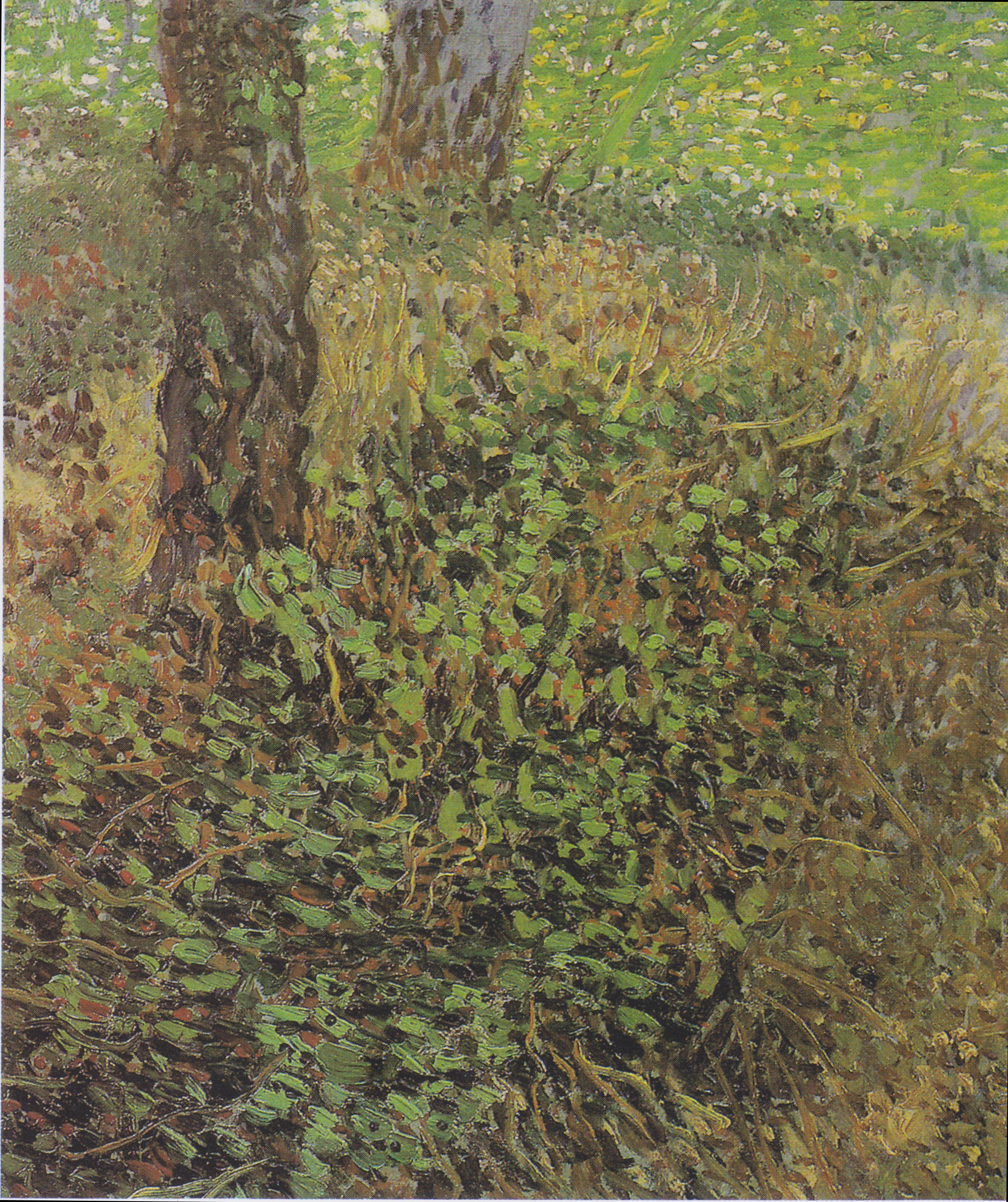
Undergrowth, 1887, Van Gogh Museum, Amsterdam (F308)

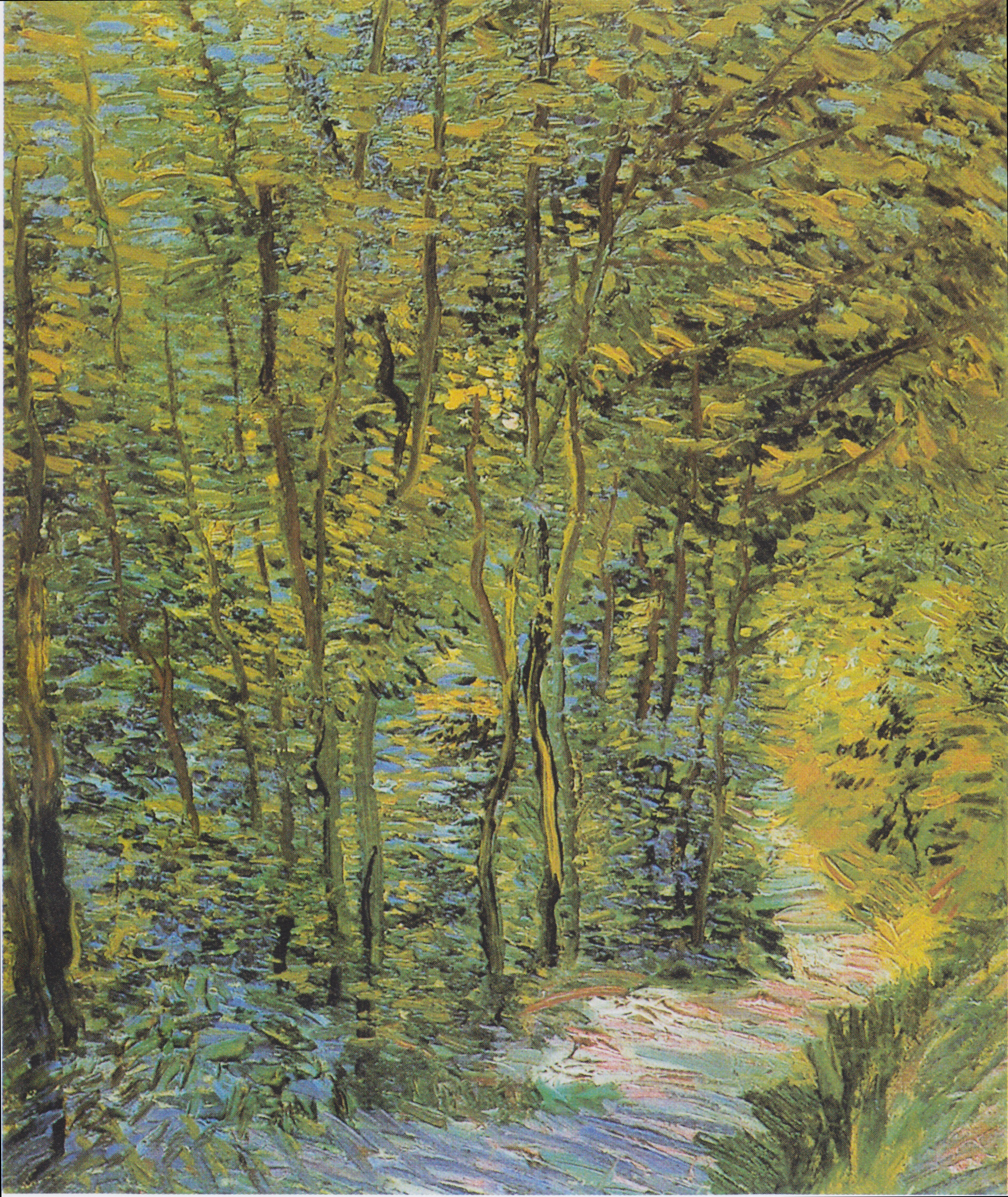
Path in the Woods, 1887, Van Gogh Museum, Amsterdam (F309)

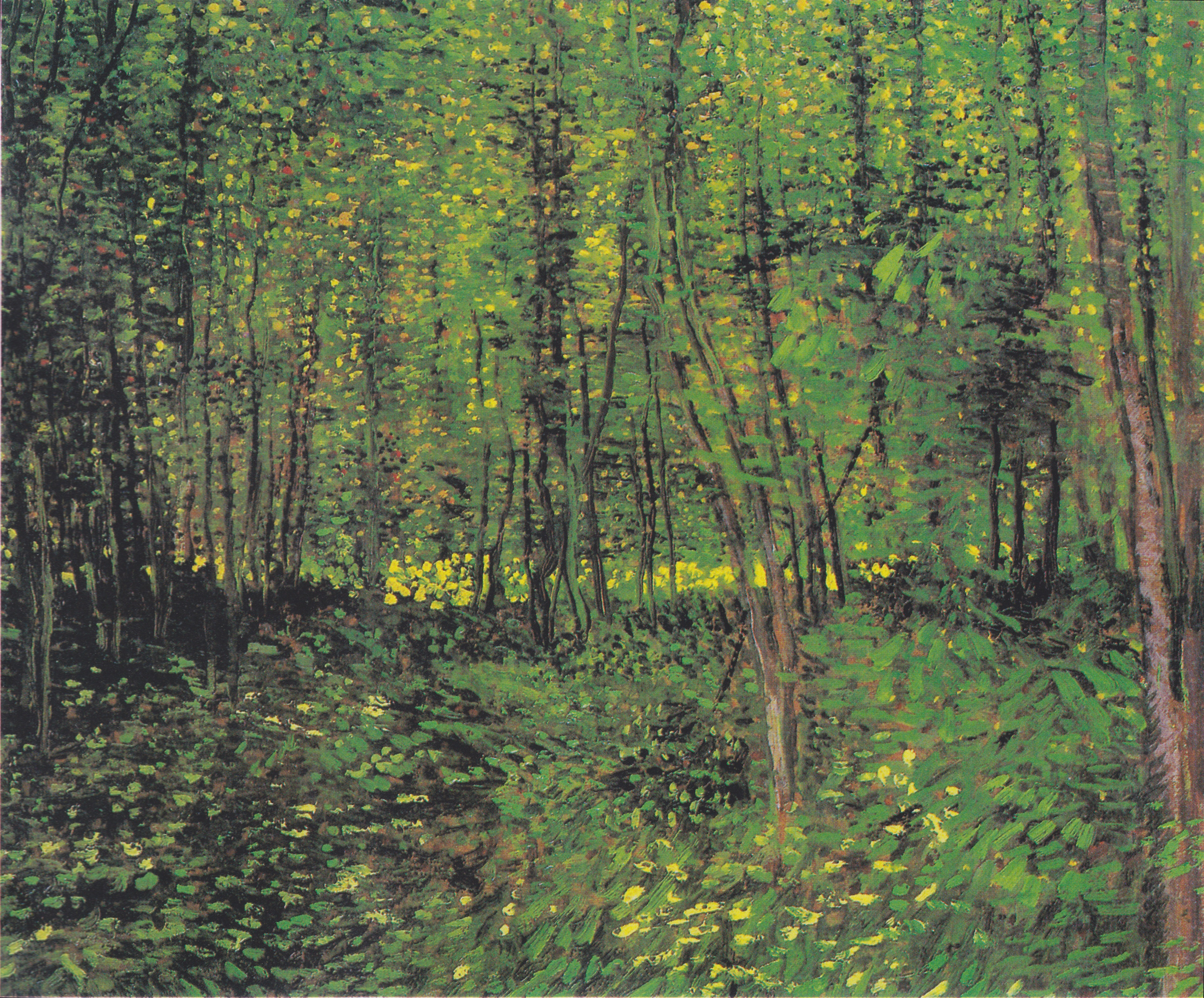
Trees and Undergrowth, 1887, Van Gogh Museum, Amsterdam (F309a)

== Saint-Rémy ==
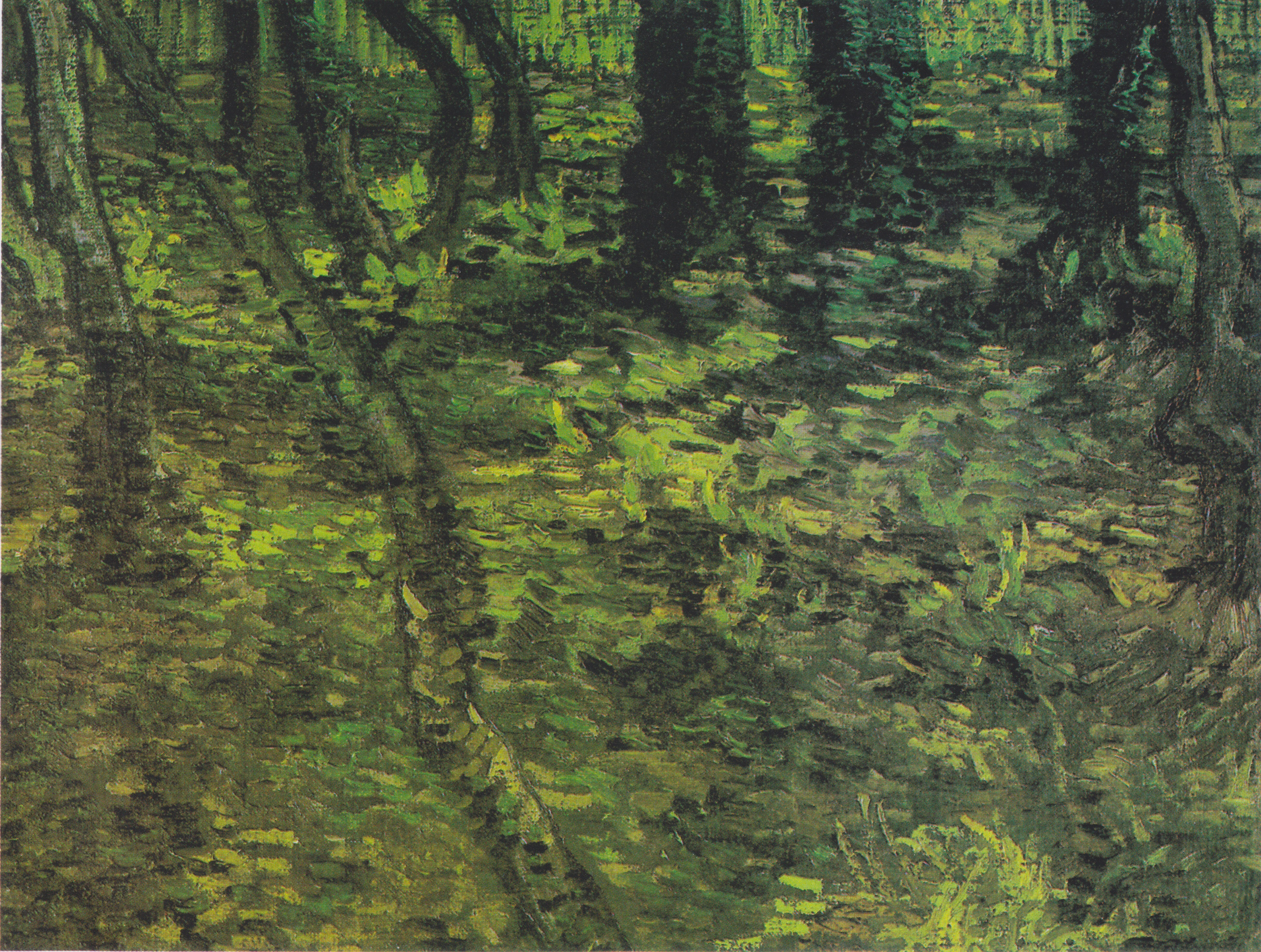
Undergrowth with Ivy July, 1889 Van Gogh Museum, Amsterdam (F745)

Van Gogh explored the grounds of the asylum where he found an overgrown garden. He wrote, "Since I have been here, I have had enough work with the overgrown garden with its large pine trees, under which there grows tall and poorly-tended grass, mixed with all kinds of periwinkle." The paintings are of growth below ivy covered trees.

Van Gogh Museum says of Undergrowth with Ivy (F745): "The effect of light and shade created an almost abstract pattern, with small arcs of paint covering the entire surface of the canvas." The second Undergrowth with Ivy painting (F746), also of undergrowth beneath trees, is made with small brushstrokes to create a blurred image that also shows the effect of light shining through the shaded trees.

Ivy, originally Le Lierre is a painting van Gogh made May 1889. He incorporated the first version in his selection of works to be displayed at Les XX, Brussels, in 1890.

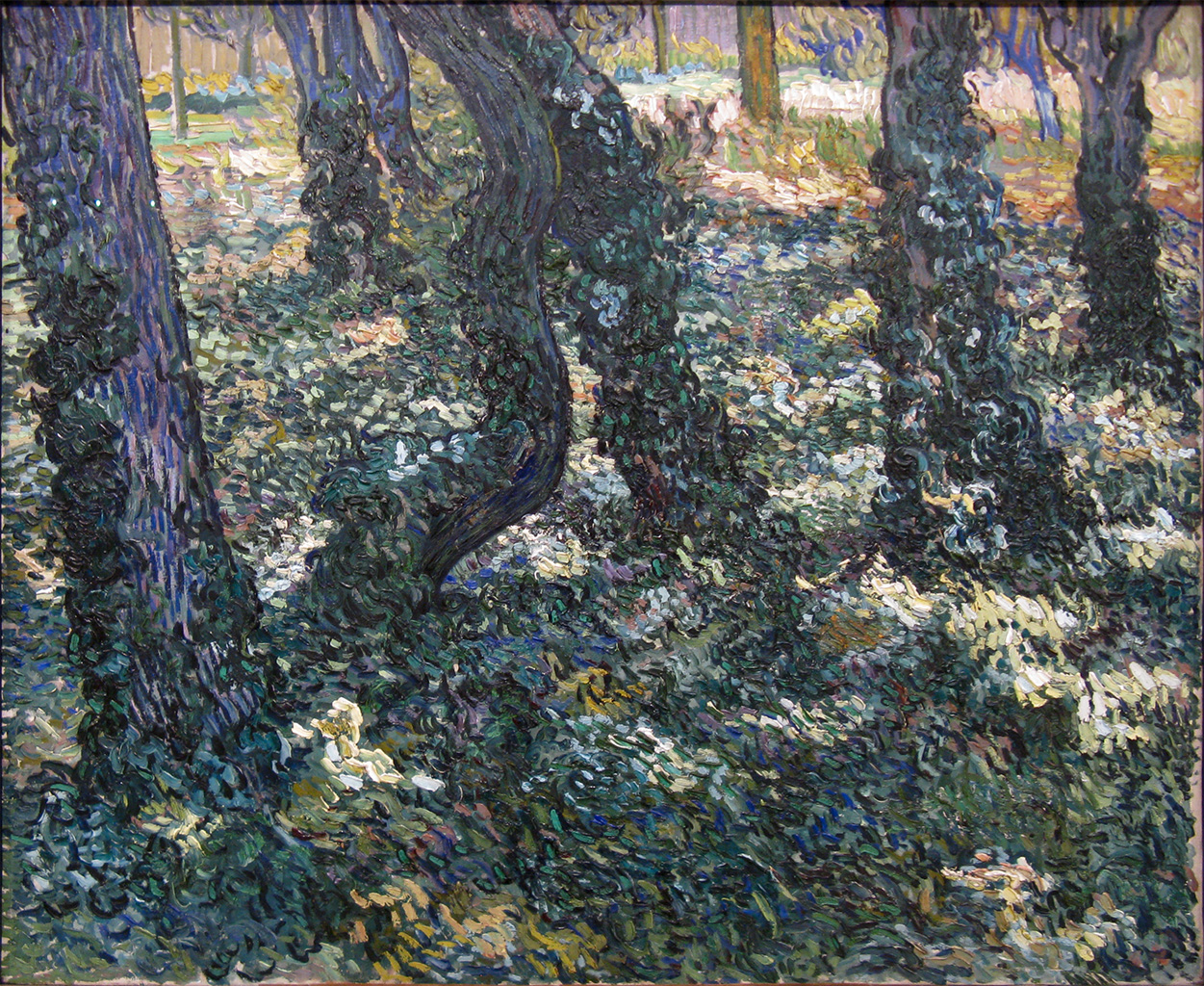
Undergrowth with Ivy
July, 1889
Van Gogh Museum, Amsterdam (F746)

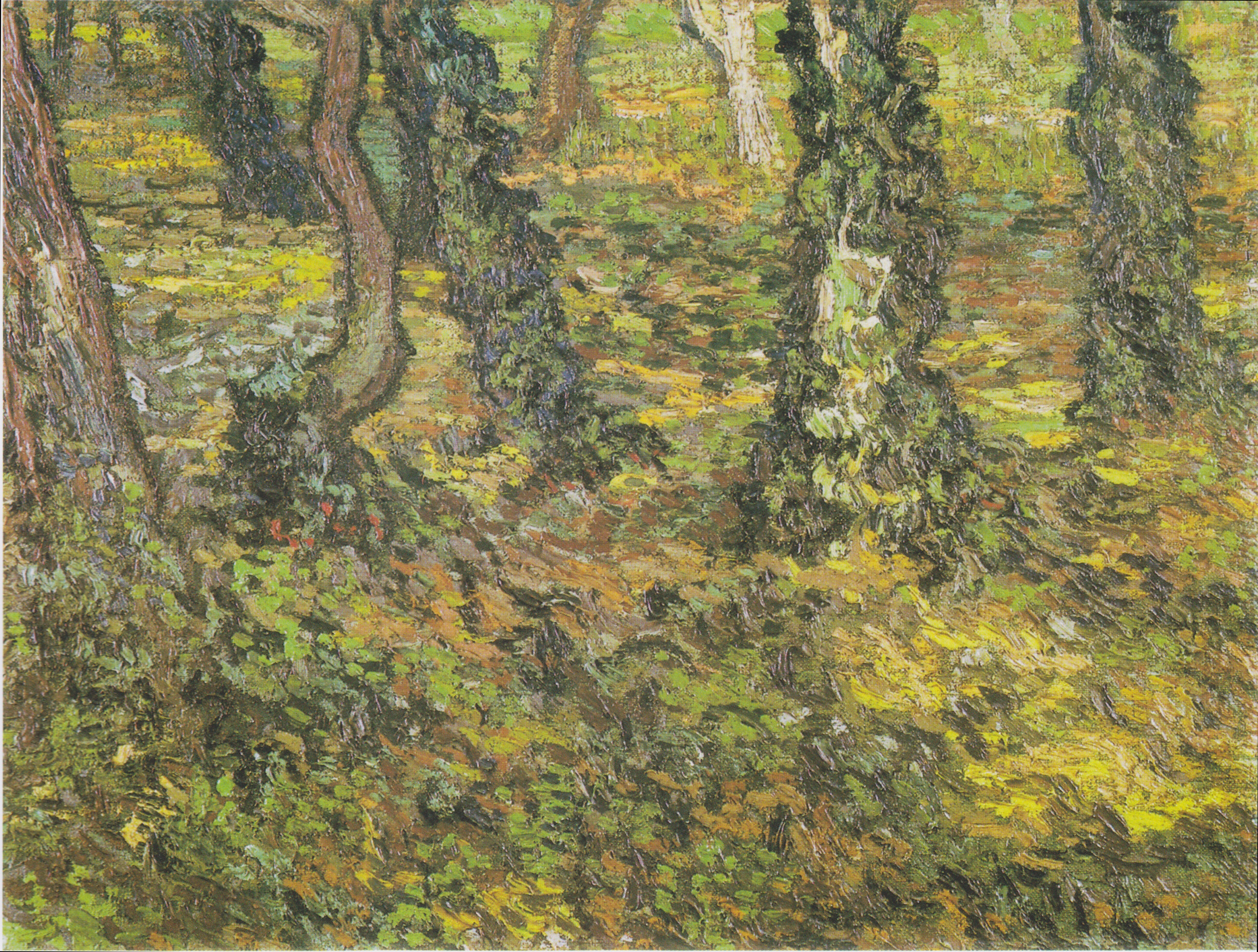
Tree Trunks with Ivy
1889
Kröller-Müller Museum, Otterlo, Netherlands (F747)

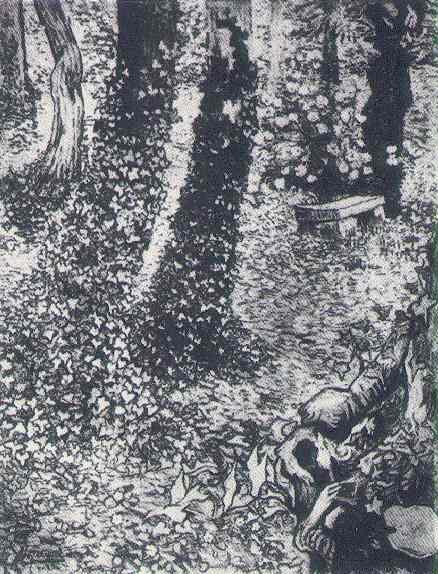
Ivy (Corner in the Garden of Saint-Paul Hospital), 1889, 92 x 72 cm, Location unknown (F609)

Vincent's brother Theo, was quite impressed with his undergrowth, or sous-bois, paintings and that Ivy (F609) of this series was included in van Gogh's list of works to show at the Brussels Les XX in 1890. The same painting was on exhibit in Paris by Père Tanguy, who felt he would very likely sell it.

== Auvers ==
In 1975 wax was applied on the back of Undergrowth with Two Figures painting to "protect the canvas and secure the paint." Over more than three decades the wax has turned milky and the painting has lost its gloss. An art historian at the Cincinnati Art Museum is restoring the work, a painstaking process with a solvent to gently loosen and a cotton swab to remove the wax. A microscope is used to see the detail.

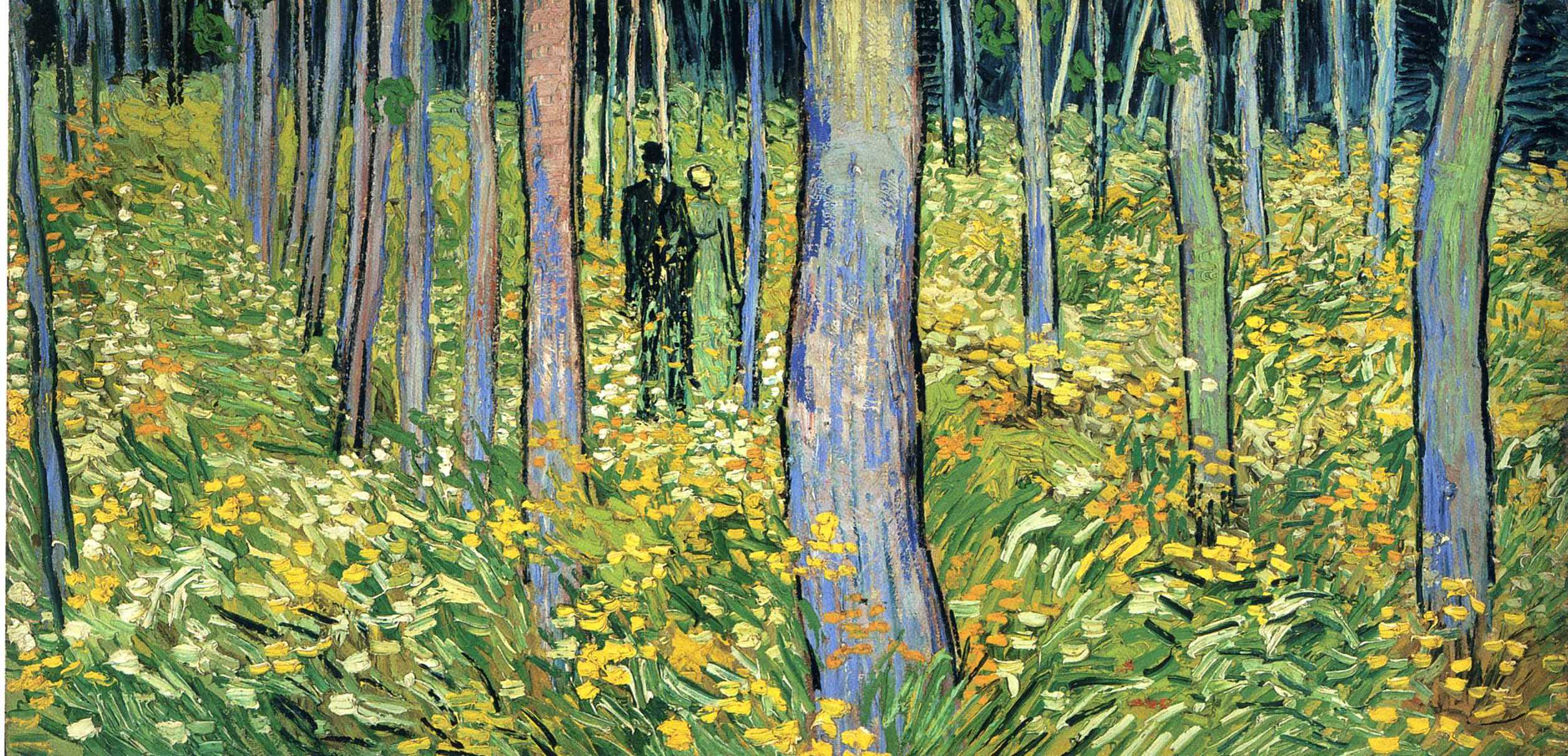
Undergrowth with Two Figures, 1890, Cincinnati Art Museum, Cincinnati, Ohio (F773)

== Dickens "Ivy Green" ==
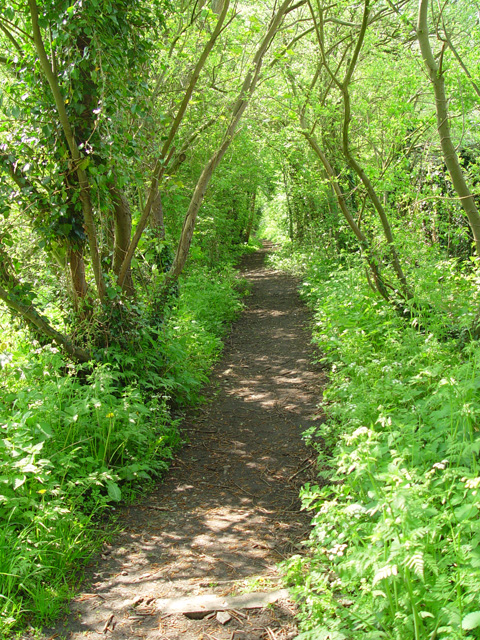
Path of trees with ivy undergrowth, photograph

Whether describing ivy crawling up a home - or lit by rays of sun beneath trees, van Gogh enjoyed ivy and referred to Charles Dickens' poem "Ivy Green" in his early letters.

"The Ivy Green" by Charles Dickens

Oh, a dainty plant is the Ivy green,
That creepeth o'er ruins old!
Of right choice food are his meals, I ween,
In his cell so lone and cold.
The wall must be crumbled, the stone decayed,
To pleasure his dainty whim:
And the mouldering dust that years have made
Is a merry meal for him.
Creeping where no life is seen,
A rare old plant is the Ivy green.

Fast he stealeth on, though he wears no wings,
And a staunch old heart has he.
How closely he twineth, how tight he clings
To his friend the huge Oak Tree!
And slyly he traileth along the ground,
And his leaves he gently waves,
As he joyously hugs and crawleth round
The rich mould of dead men's graves.
Creeping where grim death hath been,
A rare old plant is the Ivy green.

Whole ages have fled and their works decayed,
And nations have scattered been;
But the stout old Ivy shall never fade,
From its hale and hearty green.
The brave old plant, in its lonely days,
Shall fatten upon the past:
For the stateliest building man can raise
Is the Ivy's food at last.
Creeping on where time has been,
A rare old plant is the Ivy green.

The Trees and Undergrowth or sous-bois series of works he made in Paris and Saint-Rémy pay homage to Van Gogh's early letters about ivy.

== See also ==
- List of works by Vincent van Gogh
