= Ivon Hitchens =

British artist (1893–1979)

- Born: London, 1893
- Died: Selsey Bill, 1979
- Education: St John's Wood School of Art; Royal Academy Schools
- Known for: Painting
- Movement: The London Group (till 1940s) then independent
- Children: John Hitchens, Simon Hitchens (grandson)

Ivon Hitchens (born London, 3 March 1893 – 29 August 1979) was an English painter who started exhibiting during the 1920s. He became part of the 'London Group' of artists and exhibited with them during the 1930s. His house was bombed in 1940 during World War II. Hitchens and his family abandoned London for the Sussex countryside, where he acquired a small area of woodland on Lavington Common (near Petworth), and lived there in a caravan, which he gradually augmented with a series of buildings. It was here that the artist further developed his fascination with the woodland subject matter, and this pre-occupation continued until the artist's death in 1979.

Hitchens is particularly well known for panoramic landscape paintings created from blocks of colour. There is a huge mural by him in the main hall of Cecil Sharp House. His work was exhibited in the British Pavilion at the Venice Biennale in 1956.

Hitchens was the son of the artist Alfred Hitchens. His son John Hitchens and grandson Simon Hitchens are both artists.

== Exhibitions ==
- 1925 One-man exhibition, Mayor Gallery, London
- 1928 Arthur Tooth & Sons, London
- 1929 London Artists' Association, Cooling Galleries, London
- 1930 Heal's Mansard Gallery, London
- 1933 Alex Reid & Lefevre, London (also 1935 and 1937)
- 1934 Participated in Objective Abstractions, Zwemmer Gallery
- 1937 Storran Gallery exhibition
- 1940 First of ten one-man exhibitions, Leicester Galleries (also in 1942, 1944, 1947, 1949, 1950, 1952, 1954, 1957 and 1959)
- 1945 Retrospective exhibition, Temple Newsam House, Leeds
- 1947 Friends of Bristol Art Gallery
- 1947 Arts Council exhibition Glastonbury and Cirencester
- 1948 Retrospective exhibition, Graves Art Gallery, Sheffield
- 1951 Festival of Britain exhibition Bristol Art Gallery
- 1953 Metropolitan Art Gallery, Tokyo
- 1956 Gimpel Fils, London
- 1956 Represented Britain at the XXVIII Venice Biennale
- 1958 Laing Art Galleries, Toronto
- 1960 One man exhibition, Waddington Galleries, London (also in 1962, 1964, 1966, 1968, 1969, 1971, 1973, 1976, 1982, 1985, 1990, 1993 and 1996)
- 1963 Major retrospective exhibition arranged by the Arts Council, Tate Gallery, London
- 1964 Civic Art Gallery, Southampton, University of Southampton Arts Festival
- 1966 Tib Lane Gallery, Manchester, Poindexter Gallery, New York; Worthing Art Gallery
- 1967 Treasures from West Country exhibition, Bristol City Art Gallery
- 1967 Stone Gallery, Newcastle
- 1971 Basil Jacobs Fine Art, London
- 1972 Rutland Gallery, London, Landscape into Abstract
- 1978 Burstow Gallery, Brighton College
- 1978 Retrospective exhibition, Towner Art Gallery, Eastbourne
- 1979 Retrospective exhibition, Royal Academy
- 1980 Bohun Gallery, Henley-on-Thames
- 1982 New Art Centre, London
- 1987 Oriel 31, Welshpool and Newtown, Powys
- 1989 Retrospective exhibition, Serpentine Gallery, London
- 1991 Cleveland Bridge Gallery, Bath
- 1993 Bernard Jacobson Gallery, London
- 1993 Pallant House Gallery, Chichester
- 1993 Abbot Hall Art Gallery, Kendal
- 2000 Jonathan Clark Fine Art, London, A Visual Sound
- 2003 Jonathan Clark Fine Art, London, Landscapes
- 2005 Towner Art Gallery, Eastbourne
- 2005 Jonathan Clark Fine Art, Nudes
- 2007 Pallant House Gallery, Chichester
- 2007 Jonathan Clark Fine Art, London, The Flower Paintings
- 2009 Jonathan Clark Fine Art, London, Unseen Paintings from the 1930s
- 2018 Saatchi Gallery Retrospective British Art Fair
- 2019 Garden Museum, London
- 2019 'Space Through Colour': Pallant House Gallery, Chichester; then Djanogly Gallery, Lakeside Arts, University of Nottingham

== Sources ==
- Art Fact
