= John Hitchens =

English painter

John Hitchens (born 1940) is an English painter. His work is influenced by the landscape of the South Downs and his main subject area is the countryside of West Sussex, England. He also spent extended periods working in North Wales and North West Scotland. Hitchens' paintings are primarily concerned with expressing patterns and textures of the landscape. During the past decades his work has evolved into an abstract style using a range of earth colours.

== Biography ==
John Hitchens was born in Hove, Sussex, England. Both his father, Ivon Hitchens (1893–1979) and his grandfather Alfred Hitchens (1861–1942) were also painters. He attended Bedales School near Petersfield, Hampshire, and studied at the Academy of Art, Corsham. Hitchens started exhibiting in the 1960s with a series of solo exhibitions, notably with the Marjorie Parr Gallery in London. His work is represented in several public and private collections in England and overseas.

He lives near Petworth, West Sussex and works at the studio his father built in the woods.

In March 2020 Southampton City Art Gallery mounted a major retrospective of John Hitchens' paintings, covering more than five decades of his work.

Exhibitions featuring work by John Hitchens, his father Ivon, his grandfather Alfred, and his son Simon, a sculptor, were held at Kevis House Gallery in Petworth in 2019 and at Southampton City Art Gallery in 2022/3.

== Work in public and private collections ==
- Bradford City Art Gallery
- Brighton Museum & Art Gallery
- Brasenose College, Oxford
- New College, Oxford.
- Ferens Art Gallery, Hull
- Magdalene College, Cambridge
- Nuffield College, Oxford
- University of Chichester
- Towner Gallery, Eastbourne
- Leicester University
- Southampton City Art Gallery
- Chippenham Museum and Art Collection
