= Pantechnicon =

Type of delivery van

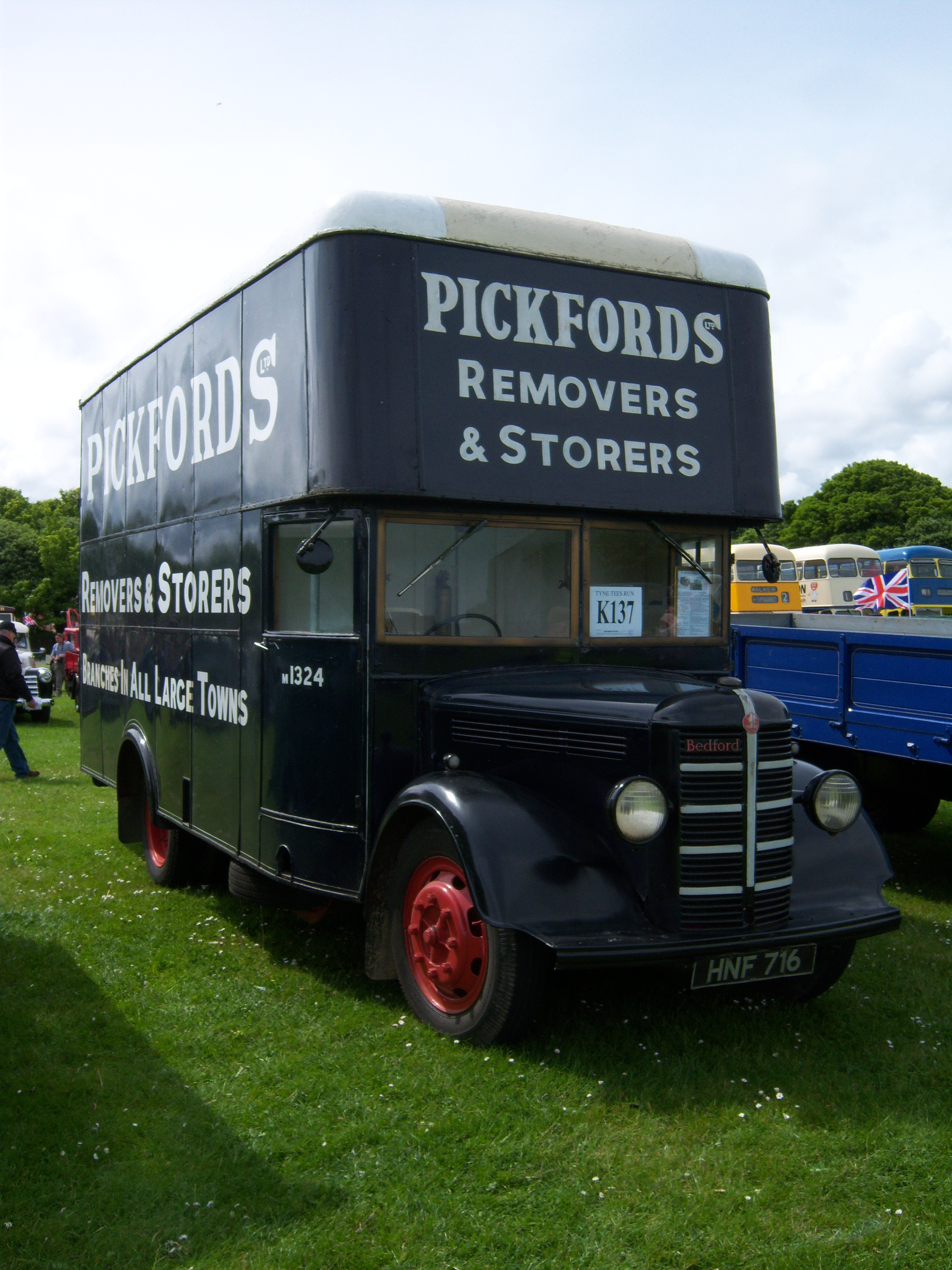
A 1947 Bedford MLZ pantechnicon

A pantechnicon was originally a heavy furniture removal van drawn by horses and used by the British company The Pantechnicon for delivering and collecting furniture which its customers wished to store. The name is a word largely of British English usage.

== Origins and building ==
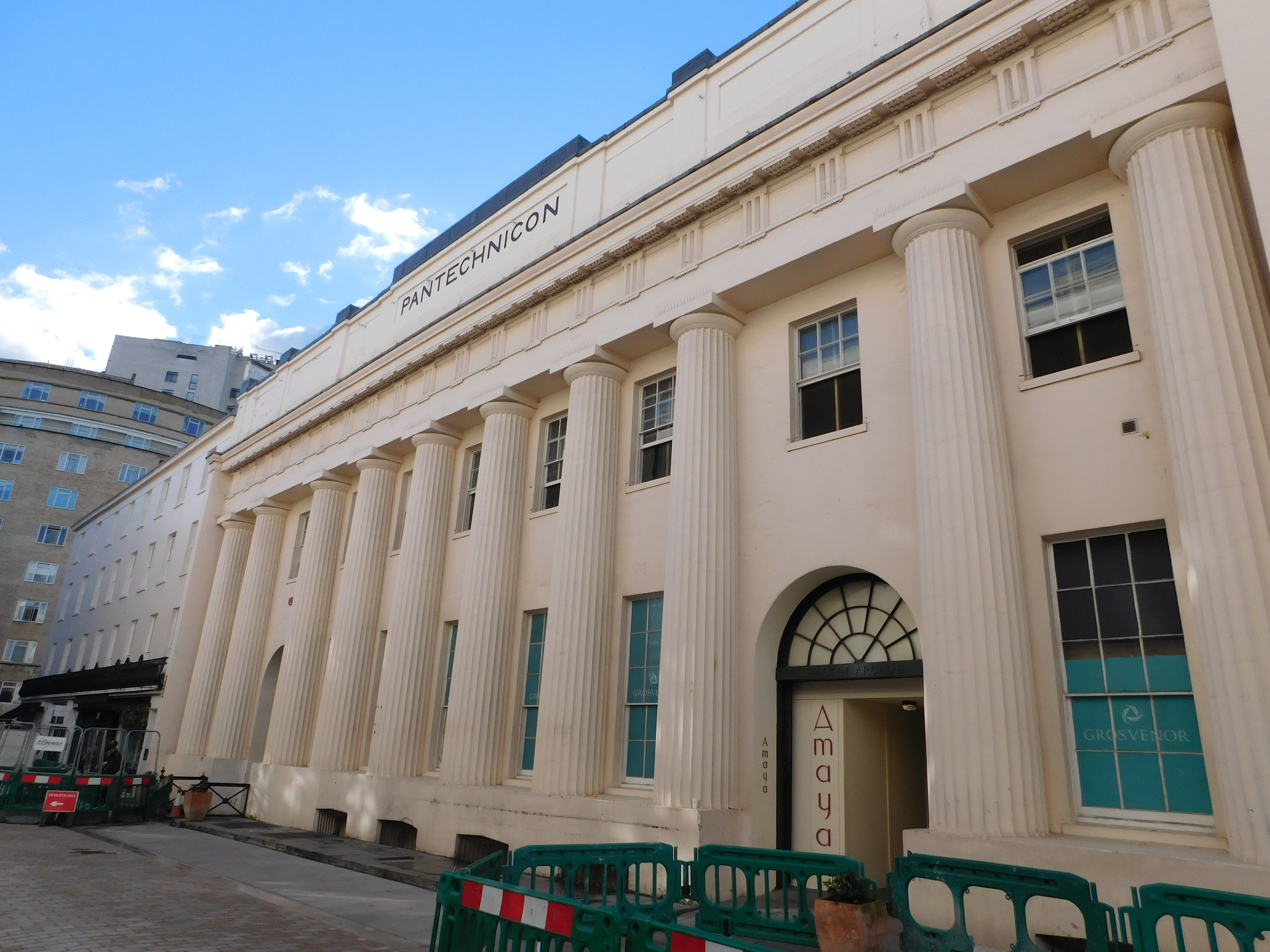
The Pantechnicon, Motcomb Street, 2017

The word "pantechnicon" is an invented one, formed from the Greek pan ("all") and techne ("art"). It was originally the name of a large establishment in Motcomb Street, Belgravia, London, opened in May 1831. It combined a picture gallery, a furniture shop, and the sale of carriages, while its southern half was a sizable warehouse for storing furniture and other items. Seth Smith, whose family were originally from Wiltshire, was a builder/property developer in the early 19th century, and constructed much of the new housing in Belgravia, then a country area. Their clients required storage facilities and this was built on an awkward left-over triangular site with a Greek style Doric column façade, and called Pantechnicon, pseudo-Greek for "pertaining to all the arts or crafts".

Subsequently, special wagons were designed with sloping ramps to more easily load furniture, with the building name on the side. The very large, distinctive horse-drawn vans that were used to collect and deliver the customers' furniture came to be known as "pantechnicon vans". From around 1900, the name was shortened to simply "pantechnicon". The Pantechnicon Ltd, a furniture storage and removal company, continued to trade until the 1970s.

The building was largely destroyed by fire in 1874, but the façade still exists and the usefulness of the vans was by then well established and they had been adopted by other firms. In 2015, the façade and the building behind was leased by its owner, Grosvenor Estates, to Cubitt House, a company specializing in pubs and restaurants in the Belgravia area, and has been redeveloped into a "food and retail emporium" over six floors, including a basement and a roof-terrace.

== Design ==
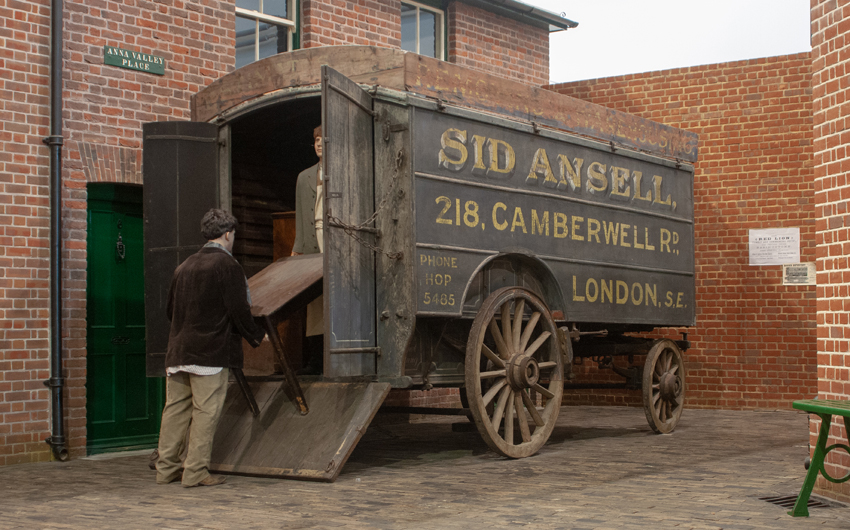
An original pantechnicon at the Milestones Museum of Living History in Hampshire

Though small by modern standards, the vans were impressively large by those of their own time. They came in lengths of between 12 and 18 ft (3.7 and 5.5 m), but a typical van would be 16 ft (4.9 m) long and 6 ft 8 in (2.03 m) broad. The roof was a segment of a cylinder 8 in (200 mm) higher in the middle than at the edges to ensure ready drainage but it had boards round the edges to allow stowage of extra items. Below the roof-line the body was a cuboid box except that behind the space required by the front wheels when turning tightly, the floor was lowered to permit greater internal headroom. This was achieved by cranking the back axle downwards as in a float, an idea first employed by a Mr Purdy. The well thus formed was 9 ft 8 in (2.95 m) long and 4 ft 8 in (1.42 m) wide. The lowered floor also saved some of the lifting which was a feature of using normal horse-drawn lorries and vans, which needed a deck high enough to fit the steering mechanism below it. Access was obtained through hinged doors at the rear. Outside these, the tailboard was hinged upwards from the level of the well.

== Use ==
Some pantechnicons were drawn by two horses in tandem. This seems to have been so as to allow entry to relatively narrow town lanes and such places as the warehouse doorways. To give the driver a clear view of obstructions and to enable him to control the lead horse, he was usually seated on the front of the roof. When horses were replaced by traction engines the vans gained a new lease of life, being easily adapted to the new form of traction.

From the early 1900s onward lift-off container bodies were introduced which could be lifted off the chassis and transferred to a rail wagon or to the hold of a ship.

The value of these vans seems to have been quite quickly appreciated so that removal firms other than The Pantechnicon operated them, sometimes over long distances between towns, a business which was eventually superseded by the spread of the railways.

== Popular culture ==
Charles Dickens mentions the Pantechnicon as a place to buy carriages in Pictures from Italy and The Uncommercial Traveler. In Chapter 2 of Our Mutual Friend, the Pantechnicon is mentioned as being the most-likely source of delivering a "bran-new baby" to the new-money family, the Veneerings.

William Makepeace Thackeray's Vanity Fair (1848) mentions the Pantechnicon as a storage service:

The house was dismantled; the rich furniture and effects, the awful chandeliers and dreary blank mirrors packed away and hidden, the rich rosewood drawing-room suite was muffled in straw, the carpets were rolled up and corded, the small select library of well-bound books was stowed into two wine-chests, and the whole paraphernalia rolled away in several enormous vans to the Pantechnicon, where they were to lie until Georgy's majority.

An adventure with a runaway pantechnicon is one of the episodes in the Arnold Bennett novel, The Card (1911).

Arthur Machen mentions pantechnicon in The Three Impostors (1895): "Then there came a huge pantechnicon warehouse" ('Adventure of the gold Tiberius' from "The Three Impostors").

M. R. James mentions the fire that partially destroyed the Pantechnicon in his ghost story Count Magnus, as having probably destroyed some of his main character's papers.

H. G. Wells mentions the Pantechnicon as a concert venue in Star Begotten (1937).

E. F. Benson mentions the Pantechnicon in his short story The Male Impersonator: "As she skirted along one side of this square, which led into Curfew Street, she saw a large pantechnicon van lumbering along its cobbled way". (1929)

Ken Follett's novel, Winter of the World mentions a pantechnicon being used by Daisy Peshkov Fitzherbert's servants to deliver her belongings.

Beatrix Potter mentions pantechnicons in The Tale of Little Pig Robinson (1930):

"Now take care of yourself in Stymouth, Nephew Robinson. Beware of gunpowder, and ships' cooks, and pantechnicons, and sausages, and shoes, and ships, and sealing-wax. Remember the blue bag, the soap, the darning-wool— what was the other thing?” said Aunt Dorcas.

In the 1971 novel, The Freedom Trap, by Desmond Bagley, a pantechnicon was used to transport a minivan carrying the protagonist Owen Stannard after his escape from prison.

== Modern usage ==
A pantech truck or van is a word derivation of "pantechnicon" of current common use in Australia. A pantech is a truck or van with a freight hull constructed of — or converted to feature — hard panels. They are variously used as removal vans, for chilled freight, etc.
