= List of minor planets: 56001–57000 =

The following is a partial list of minor planets, running from minor-planet number 56001 through 57000, inclusive. The primary data for this and other partial lists is based on JPL's "Small-Body Orbital Elements" and data available from the Minor Planet Center. Critical list information is also provided by the MPC, unless otherwise specified from Lowell Observatory. A detailed description of the table's columns and additional sources are given on the main page including a complete list of every page in this series, and a statistical break-up on the dynamical classification of minor planets.

Also see the summary list of all named bodies in numerical and alphabetical order, and the corresponding naming citations for the number range of this particular list. New namings may only be added to this list after official publication, as the preannouncement of names is condemned by the Working Group for Small Bodies Nomenclature of the International Astronomical Union.

Near-Earth obj.	MBA (inner)	MBA (outer)	Centaur
Mars-crosser	MBA (middle)	Jupiter trojan	Trans-Neptunian obj.
Unclassified

== 56001–56100 ==
Designation			Discovery			Properties		Ref
Permanent	Provisional	Named after	Date	Site	Discoverer(s)	Category	Diam.	Ref
56001	1998 SR_{146}	—	September 20, 1998	La Silla	E. W. Elst	·	2.2 km	MPC · JPL
56002	1998 SJ_{147}	—	September 20, 1998	La Silla	E. W. Elst	·	1.4 km	MPC · JPL
56003	1998 SB_{156}	—	September 26, 1998	Socorro	LINEAR	·	1.5 km	MPC · JPL
56004	1998 SO_{161}	—	September 26, 1998	Socorro	LINEAR	·	1.5 km	MPC · JPL
56005	1998 SK_{169}	—	September 22, 1998	Anderson Mesa	LONEOS	GEF	3.0 km	MPC · JPL
56006	1998 TJ_{13}	—	October 13, 1998	Kitt Peak	Spacewatch	·	2.4 km	MPC · JPL
56007	1998 TP_{14}	—	October 14, 1998	Kitt Peak	Spacewatch	·	1.4 km	MPC · JPL
56008	1998 TL_{20}	—	October 13, 1998	Kitt Peak	Spacewatch	·	1.3 km	MPC · JPL
56009	1998 TZ_{33}	—	October 14, 1998	Anderson Mesa	LONEOS	·	1.6 km	MPC · JPL
56010	1998 UJ_{8}	—	October 24, 1998	Oizumi	T. Kobayashi	·	5.0 km	MPC · JPL
56011 Sarahantier	1998 UJ_{16}	Sarahantier	October 23, 1998	Caussols	ODAS	·	3.6 km	MPC · JPL
56012	1998 UE_{19}	—	October 27, 1998	Višnjan Observatory	K. Korlević	·	1.8 km	MPC · JPL
56013	1998 UB_{21}	—	October 29, 1998	Višnjan Observatory	K. Korlević	PHO	2.7 km	MPC · JPL
56014	1998 UO_{25}	—	October 18, 1998	La Silla	E. W. Elst	·	1.6 km	MPC · JPL
56015	1998 UH_{26}	—	October 18, 1998	La Silla	E. W. Elst	·	1.6 km	MPC · JPL
56016	1998 UO_{36}	—	October 28, 1998	Socorro	LINEAR	·	1.8 km	MPC · JPL
56017	1998 VC_{4}	—	November 11, 1998	Caussols	ODAS	MAS	1.8 km	MPC · JPL
56018 Yujawang	1998 VH_{4}	Yujawang	November 11, 1998	Caussols	ODAS	·	1.4 km	MPC · JPL
56019	1998 VS_{4}	—	November 11, 1998	Socorro	LINEAR	·	1.7 km	MPC · JPL
56020	1998 VW_{10}	—	November 10, 1998	Socorro	LINEAR	·	1.4 km	MPC · JPL
56021	1998 VD_{16}	—	November 10, 1998	Socorro	LINEAR	·	2.2 km	MPC · JPL
56022	1998 VL_{23}	—	November 10, 1998	Socorro	LINEAR	·	2.0 km	MPC · JPL
56023	1998 VX_{28}	—	November 10, 1998	Socorro	LINEAR	·	2.0 km	MPC · JPL
56024	1998 VA_{30}	—	November 10, 1998	Socorro	LINEAR	·	3.3 km	MPC · JPL
56025	1998 VW_{30}	—	November 10, 1998	Socorro	LINEAR	·	1.9 km	MPC · JPL
56026	1998 VN_{52}	—	November 13, 1998	Socorro	LINEAR	·	5.3 km	MPC · JPL
56027	1998 WG_{1}	—	November 18, 1998	Catalina	CSS	PHO	2.7 km	MPC · JPL
56028	1998 WA_{14}	—	November 21, 1998	Socorro	LINEAR	·	1.6 km	MPC · JPL
56029	1998 WZ_{15}	—	November 21, 1998	Socorro	LINEAR	NYS	1.6 km	MPC · JPL
56030	1998 WH_{16}	—	November 21, 1998	Socorro	LINEAR	·	1.8 km	MPC · JPL
56031	1998 WO_{18}	—	November 21, 1998	Socorro	LINEAR	·	3.2 km	MPC · JPL
56032	1998 WX_{18}	—	November 21, 1998	Socorro	LINEAR	·	1.7 km	MPC · JPL
56033	1998 WF_{19}	—	November 21, 1998	Socorro	LINEAR	·	2.6 km	MPC · JPL
56034	1998 WS_{19}	—	November 25, 1998	Socorro	LINEAR	·	3.0 km	MPC · JPL
56035	1998 WV_{20}	—	November 18, 1998	Socorro	LINEAR	·	1.8 km	MPC · JPL
56036	1998 WH_{31}	—	November 23, 1998	Catalina	CSS	PHO	2.7 km	MPC · JPL
56037	1998 WF_{32}	—	November 20, 1998	Anderson Mesa	LONEOS	·	1.9 km	MPC · JPL
56038 Jackmapanje	1998 XC_{3}	Jackmapanje	December 7, 1998	Colleverde	V. S. Casulli	·	2.1 km	MPC · JPL
56039	1998 XO_{3}	—	December 9, 1998	Oizumi	T. Kobayashi	·	2.5 km	MPC · JPL
56040	1998 XP_{3}	—	December 9, 1998	Oizumi	T. Kobayashi	NYS	2.0 km	MPC · JPL
56041 Luciendumont	1998 XO_{4}	Luciendumont	December 8, 1998	Blauvac	R. Roy	·	2.5 km	MPC · JPL
56042	1998 XW_{10}	—	December 15, 1998	Caussols	ODAS	V	3.6 km	MPC · JPL
56043	1998 XQ_{11}	—	December 14, 1998	Prescott	P. G. Comba	·	2.8 km	MPC · JPL
56044	1998 XU_{17}	—	December 15, 1998	Woomera	F. B. Zoltowski	NYS	2.0 km	MPC · JPL
56045	1998 XD_{21}	—	December 10, 1998	Kitt Peak	Spacewatch	·	3.0 km	MPC · JPL
56046	1998 XC_{26}	—	December 15, 1998	Xinglong	SCAP	·	5.1 km	MPC · JPL
56047	1998 XK_{36}	—	December 14, 1998	Socorro	LINEAR	·	1.7 km	MPC · JPL
56048	1998 XV_{39}	—	December 14, 1998	Socorro	LINEAR	·	2.4 km	MPC · JPL
56049	1998 XA_{44}	—	December 14, 1998	Socorro	LINEAR	·	2.9 km	MPC · JPL
56050	1998 XG_{45}	—	December 14, 1998	Socorro	LINEAR	·	2.0 km	MPC · JPL
56051	1998 XF_{50}	—	December 14, 1998	Socorro	LINEAR	NYS	3.3 km	MPC · JPL
56052	1998 XN_{50}	—	December 14, 1998	Socorro	LINEAR	·	2.5 km	MPC · JPL
56053	1998 XG_{52}	—	December 14, 1998	Socorro	LINEAR	·	2.2 km	MPC · JPL
56054	1998 XR_{52}	—	December 14, 1998	Socorro	LINEAR	·	1.8 km	MPC · JPL
56055	1998 XB_{54}	—	December 14, 1998	Socorro	LINEAR	·	1.9 km	MPC · JPL
56056	1998 XP_{58}	—	December 15, 1998	Socorro	LINEAR	slow?	3.1 km	MPC · JPL
56057	1998 XZ_{59}	—	December 15, 1998	Socorro	LINEAR	·	2.0 km	MPC · JPL
56058	1998 XL_{62}	—	December 11, 1998	Socorro	LINEAR	PHO	2.9 km	MPC · JPL
56059	1998 XE_{64}	—	December 14, 1998	Socorro	LINEAR	·	2.4 km	MPC · JPL
56060	1998 XT_{70}	—	December 14, 1998	Socorro	LINEAR	·	2.0 km	MPC · JPL
56061	1998 XY_{90}	—	December 15, 1998	Socorro	LINEAR	·	1.8 km	MPC · JPL
56062	1998 XD_{91}	—	December 15, 1998	Socorro	LINEAR	(5)	2.3 km	MPC · JPL
56063	1998 XM_{93}	—	December 15, 1998	Socorro	LINEAR	·	4.7 km	MPC · JPL
56064	1998 XW_{93}	—	December 15, 1998	Socorro	LINEAR	·	3.0 km	MPC · JPL
56065	1998 XB_{97}	—	December 12, 1998	Mérida	Naranjo, O. A.	·	2.4 km	MPC · JPL
56066	1998 YA	—	December 16, 1998	Višnjan Observatory	K. Korlević	MAS	2.4 km	MPC · JPL
56067 Argerich	1998 YH_{2}	Argerich	December 17, 1998	Caussols	ODAS	EUN	4.5 km	MPC · JPL
56068	1998 YQ_{2}	—	December 17, 1998	Caussols	ODAS	NYS	2.0 km	MPC · JPL
56069	1998 YL_{5}	—	December 17, 1998	Gekko	T. Kagawa	·	1.9 km	MPC · JPL
56070	1998 YQ_{5}	—	December 21, 1998	Oizumi	T. Kobayashi	·	2.5 km	MPC · JPL
56071	1998 YF_{6}	—	December 22, 1998	Catalina	CSS	PHO	2.4 km	MPC · JPL
56072	1998 YK_{8}	—	December 24, 1998	Oizumi	T. Kobayashi	·	1.6 km	MPC · JPL
56073 Poggianti	1998 YO_{10}	Poggianti	December 26, 1998	San Marcello	M. Tombelli, A. Boattini	·	2.2 km	MPC · JPL
56074	1998 YG_{18}	—	December 25, 1998	Kitt Peak	Spacewatch	NYS	1.6 km	MPC · JPL
56075	1998 YV_{21}	—	December 26, 1998	Kitt Peak	Spacewatch	EUN	4.7 km	MPC · JPL
56076	1998 YV_{29}	—	December 27, 1998	Anderson Mesa	LONEOS	·	4.6 km	MPC · JPL
56077	1998 YD_{32}	—	December 21, 1998	Socorro	LINEAR	PHO	2.7 km	MPC · JPL
56078	1999 AT	—	January 7, 1999	Oizumi	T. Kobayashi	(5)	2.8 km	MPC · JPL
56079	1999 AS_{2}	—	January 9, 1999	Oizumi	T. Kobayashi	MAR	3.9 km	MPC · JPL
56080	1999 AN_{3}	—	January 9, 1999	Gekko	T. Kagawa	·	2.8 km	MPC · JPL
56081	1999 AU_{8}	—	January 10, 1999	Fair Oaks Ranch	J. V. McClusky	·	3.9 km	MPC · JPL
56082	1999 AK_{9}	—	January 9, 1999	Xinglong	SCAP	NYS · fast	2.3 km	MPC · JPL
56083	1999 AQ_{16}	—	January 10, 1999	Kitt Peak	Spacewatch	NYS	2.9 km	MPC · JPL
56084	1999 AN_{19}	—	January 13, 1999	Kitt Peak	Spacewatch	·	3.5 km	MPC · JPL
56085	1999 AV_{19}	—	January 13, 1999	Kitt Peak	Spacewatch	·	3.4 km	MPC · JPL
56086	1999 AA_{21}	—	January 13, 1999	Nachi-Katsuura	Y. Shimizu, T. Urata	PHO	5.2 km	MPC · JPL
56087	1999 AH_{22}	—	January 13, 1999	Xinglong	SCAP	NYS	2.1 km	MPC · JPL
56088 Wuheng	1999 AZ_{23}	Wuheng	January 14, 1999	Xinglong	SCAP	·	4.6 km	MPC · JPL
56089	1999 AY_{25}	—	January 6, 1999	Višnjan Observatory	K. Korlević	NYS	2.6 km	MPC · JPL
56090	1999 BE	—	January 16, 1999	Oizumi	T. Kobayashi	V	2.2 km	MPC · JPL
56091	1999 BJ	—	January 16, 1999	Oizumi	T. Kobayashi	·	2.2 km	MPC · JPL
56092	1999 BK	—	January 16, 1999	Oizumi	T. Kobayashi	BRU	7.0 km	MPC · JPL
56093	1999 BM_{5}	—	January 18, 1999	Kitt Peak	Spacewatch	·	2.3 km	MPC · JPL
56094	1999 BW_{5}	—	January 20, 1999	Višnjan Observatory	K. Korlević	·	3.4 km	MPC · JPL
56095 Buniatishvili	1999 BL_{6}	Buniatishvili	January 20, 1999	Caussols	ODAS	GEF	4.2 km	MPC · JPL
56096	1999 BA_{9}	—	January 22, 1999	Višnjan Observatory	K. Korlević	EUN	3.9 km	MPC · JPL
56097	1999 BC_{12}	—	January 21, 1999	Uto	F. Uto	·	1.8 km	MPC · JPL
56098	1999 BE_{13}	—	January 24, 1999	Višnjan Observatory	K. Korlević	(5)	3.0 km	MPC · JPL
56099	1999 BL_{13}	—	January 25, 1999	Višnjan Observatory	K. Korlević	MAR	3.3 km	MPC · JPL
56100 Luisapolli	1999 BM_{14}	Luisapolli	January 24, 1999	Gnosca	S. Sposetti	·	6.2 km	MPC · JPL

== 56101–56200 ==
back to top

Designation			Discovery			Properties		Ref
Permanent	Provisional	Named after	Date	Site	Discoverer(s)	Category	Diam.	Ref
56101	1999 BW_{14}	—	January 18, 1999	Uenohara	N. Kawasato	·	4.3 km	MPC · JPL
56102	1999 BD_{15}	—	January 24, 1999	Višnjan Observatory	K. Korlević	NYS	1.8 km	MPC · JPL
56103	1999 BU_{19}	—	January 16, 1999	Socorro	LINEAR	·	4.4 km	MPC · JPL
56104	1999 BA_{20}	—	January 16, 1999	Socorro	LINEAR	·	5.7 km	MPC · JPL
56105	1999 BB_{20}	—	January 16, 1999	Socorro	LINEAR	·	4.1 km	MPC · JPL
56106	1999 BG_{24}	—	January 18, 1999	Socorro	LINEAR	·	3.1 km	MPC · JPL
56107	1999 BT_{25}	—	January 18, 1999	Socorro	LINEAR	·	3.6 km	MPC · JPL
56108	1999 BN_{26}	—	January 16, 1999	Kitt Peak	Spacewatch	·	4.4 km	MPC · JPL
56109	1999 BB_{32}	—	January 19, 1999	Kitt Peak	Spacewatch	·	2.6 km	MPC · JPL
56110	1999 CO_{1}	—	February 7, 1999	Oizumi	T. Kobayashi	·	2.9 km	MPC · JPL
56111	1999 CO_{2}	—	February 6, 1999	Xinglong	SCAP	HNS	5.2 km	MPC · JPL
56112	1999 CK_{5}	—	February 12, 1999	Oohira	T. Urata	PHO	5.8 km	MPC · JPL
56113	1999 CQ_{5}	—	February 12, 1999	Oizumi	T. Kobayashi	·	2.7 km	MPC · JPL
56114	1999 CA_{6}	—	February 10, 1999	Socorro	LINEAR	PHO	3.0 km	MPC · JPL
56115	1999 CN_{7}	—	February 10, 1999	Socorro	LINEAR	·	7.1 km	MPC · JPL
56116	1999 CZ_{7}	—	February 11, 1999	Socorro	LINEAR	PHO	5.0 km	MPC · JPL
56117	1999 CC_{9}	—	February 13, 1999	Reedy Creek	J. Broughton	EUN	5.6 km	MPC · JPL
56118	1999 CF_{14}	—	February 13, 1999	Višnjan Observatory	K. Korlević	·	4.4 km	MPC · JPL
56119	1999 CZ_{18}	—	February 10, 1999	Socorro	LINEAR	·	4.0 km	MPC · JPL
56120	1999 CL_{19}	—	February 10, 1999	Socorro	LINEAR	V	2.1 km	MPC · JPL
56121	1999 CB_{20}	—	February 10, 1999	Socorro	LINEAR	KRM	6.0 km	MPC · JPL
56122	1999 CS_{20}	—	February 10, 1999	Socorro	LINEAR	V	2.2 km	MPC · JPL
56123	1999 CR_{23}	—	February 10, 1999	Socorro	LINEAR	·	4.1 km	MPC · JPL
56124	1999 CH_{24}	—	February 10, 1999	Socorro	LINEAR	BRA	3.9 km	MPC · JPL
56125	1999 CC_{25}	—	February 10, 1999	Socorro	LINEAR	·	2.6 km	MPC · JPL
56126	1999 CT_{31}	—	February 10, 1999	Socorro	LINEAR	·	2.2 km	MPC · JPL
56127	1999 CC_{34}	—	February 10, 1999	Socorro	LINEAR	·	2.5 km	MPC · JPL
56128	1999 CX_{37}	—	February 10, 1999	Socorro	LINEAR	·	3.5 km	MPC · JPL
56129	1999 CH_{43}	—	February 10, 1999	Socorro	LINEAR	·	4.2 km	MPC · JPL
56130	1999 CM_{45}	—	February 10, 1999	Socorro	LINEAR	NYS	3.3 km	MPC · JPL
56131	1999 CY_{48}	—	February 10, 1999	Socorro	LINEAR	·	3.8 km	MPC · JPL
56132	1999 CO_{49}	—	February 10, 1999	Socorro	LINEAR	ADE	8.3 km	MPC · JPL
56133	1999 CX_{51}	—	February 10, 1999	Socorro	LINEAR	·	3.4 km	MPC · JPL
56134	1999 CJ_{53}	—	February 10, 1999	Socorro	LINEAR	·	3.5 km	MPC · JPL
56135	1999 CJ_{55}	—	February 10, 1999	Socorro	LINEAR	(5)	2.6 km	MPC · JPL
56136	1999 CK_{55}	—	February 10, 1999	Socorro	LINEAR	·	4.1 km	MPC · JPL
56137	1999 CW_{55}	—	February 10, 1999	Socorro	LINEAR	·	4.4 km	MPC · JPL
56138	1999 CY_{56}	—	February 10, 1999	Socorro	LINEAR	·	5.9 km	MPC · JPL
56139	1999 CV_{58}	—	February 10, 1999	Socorro	LINEAR	·	3.7 km	MPC · JPL
56140	1999 CN_{62}	—	February 12, 1999	Socorro	LINEAR	fast	3.8 km	MPC · JPL
56141	1999 CR_{76}	—	February 12, 1999	Socorro	LINEAR	·	4.8 km	MPC · JPL
56142	1999 CZ_{77}	—	February 12, 1999	Socorro	LINEAR	DOR	6.2 km	MPC · JPL
56143	1999 CO_{82}	—	February 10, 1999	Socorro	LINEAR	PHO	2.8 km	MPC · JPL
56144	1999 CB_{83}	—	February 10, 1999	Socorro	LINEAR	·	3.7 km	MPC · JPL
56145	1999 CN_{84}	—	February 10, 1999	Socorro	LINEAR	·	3.4 km	MPC · JPL
56146	1999 CR_{85}	—	February 10, 1999	Socorro	LINEAR	·	2.1 km	MPC · JPL
56147	1999 CV_{85}	—	February 10, 1999	Socorro	LINEAR	NYS	1.8 km	MPC · JPL
56148	1999 CP_{93}	—	February 10, 1999	Socorro	LINEAR	·	2.2 km	MPC · JPL
56149	1999 CP_{98}	—	February 10, 1999	Socorro	LINEAR	·	2.3 km	MPC · JPL
56150	1999 CT_{103}	—	February 12, 1999	Socorro	LINEAR	·	4.7 km	MPC · JPL
56151	1999 CX_{104}	—	February 12, 1999	Socorro	LINEAR	·	6.3 km	MPC · JPL
56152	1999 CK_{106}	—	February 12, 1999	Socorro	LINEAR	·	4.6 km	MPC · JPL
56153	1999 CT_{114}	—	February 12, 1999	Socorro	LINEAR	·	3.6 km	MPC · JPL
56154	1999 CU_{119}	—	February 11, 1999	Socorro	LINEAR	EUN	5.6 km	MPC · JPL
56155	1999 CY_{119}	—	February 11, 1999	Socorro	LINEAR	PHO	6.9 km	MPC · JPL
56156	1999 CG_{123}	—	February 11, 1999	Socorro	LINEAR	PHO	2.1 km	MPC · JPL
56157	1999 CG_{135}	—	February 8, 1999	Kitt Peak	Spacewatch	NYS	3.1 km	MPC · JPL
56158	1999 CG_{138}	—	February 11, 1999	Kitt Peak	Spacewatch	·	2.7 km	MPC · JPL
56159	1999 CK_{147}	—	February 9, 1999	Kitt Peak	Spacewatch	·	4.1 km	MPC · JPL
56160	1999 CY_{150}	—	February 8, 1999	Kitt Peak	Spacewatch	·	8.7 km	MPC · JPL
56161	1999 CG_{158}	—	February 12, 1999	Socorro	LINEAR	·	6.8 km	MPC · JPL
56162	1999 DX_{2}	—	February 20, 1999	Oohira	T. Urata	HNS	3.5 km	MPC · JPL
56163	1999 DE_{3}	—	February 22, 1999	Prescott	P. G. Comba	·	2.4 km	MPC · JPL
56164	1999 DW_{7}	—	February 18, 1999	Anderson Mesa	LONEOS	MAR	3.2 km	MPC · JPL
56165	1999 EZ_{2}	—	March 8, 1999	Višnjan Observatory	K. Korlević	·	6.9 km	MPC · JPL
56166	1999 ER_{6}	—	March 14, 1999	Kitt Peak	Spacewatch	·	2.5 km	MPC · JPL
56167	1999 EU_{11}	—	March 12, 1999	Socorro	LINEAR	·	4.2 km	MPC · JPL
56168	1999 FS_{5}	—	March 19, 1999	Farra d'Isonzo	Farra d'Isonzo	·	4.4 km	MPC · JPL
56169	1999 FU_{5}	—	March 16, 1999	Caussols	ODAS	·	4.7 km	MPC · JPL
56170 Rolandovillazón	1999 FK_{6}	Rolandovillazón	March 17, 1999	Caussols	ODAS	fast	5.0 km	MPC · JPL
56171	1999 FR_{6}	—	March 19, 1999	Caussols	ODAS	·	2.9 km	MPC · JPL
56172 Véroniquesanson	1999 FD_{7}	Véroniquesanson	March 20, 1999	Caussols	ODAS	·	7.7 km	MPC · JPL
56173	1999 FV_{9}	—	March 22, 1999	Anderson Mesa	LONEOS	EUN	3.7 km	MPC · JPL
56174	1999 FQ_{13}	—	March 19, 1999	Kitt Peak	Spacewatch	(5)	2.9 km	MPC · JPL
56175	1999 FY_{24}	—	March 19, 1999	Socorro	LINEAR	EUN	3.7 km	MPC · JPL
56176	1999 FK_{25}	—	March 19, 1999	Socorro	LINEAR	·	7.4 km	MPC · JPL
56177	1999 FU_{25}	—	March 19, 1999	Socorro	LINEAR	·	2.9 km	MPC · JPL
56178	1999 FQ_{26}	—	March 19, 1999	Socorro	LINEAR	·	4.6 km	MPC · JPL
56179	1999 FS_{26}	—	March 19, 1999	Socorro	LINEAR	·	4.6 km	MPC · JPL
56180	1999 FJ_{29}	—	March 19, 1999	Socorro	LINEAR	·	3.8 km	MPC · JPL
56181	1999 FU_{29}	—	March 19, 1999	Socorro	LINEAR	·	6.6 km	MPC · JPL
56182	1999 FE_{31}	—	March 19, 1999	Socorro	LINEAR	·	6.6 km	MPC · JPL
56183	1999 FF_{34}	—	March 19, 1999	Socorro	LINEAR	·	3.9 km	MPC · JPL
56184	1999 FB_{35}	—	March 19, 1999	Socorro	LINEAR	·	6.1 km	MPC · JPL
56185	1999 FJ_{35}	—	March 19, 1999	Socorro	LINEAR	EUN	3.4 km	MPC · JPL
56186	1999 FW_{36}	—	March 20, 1999	Socorro	LINEAR	·	7.5 km	MPC · JPL
56187	1999 FR_{39}	—	March 20, 1999	Socorro	LINEAR	·	1.5 km	MPC · JPL
56188	1999 FA_{40}	—	March 20, 1999	Socorro	LINEAR	MAR	2.4 km	MPC · JPL
56189	1999 FS_{44}	—	March 20, 1999	Socorro	LINEAR	·	4.4 km	MPC · JPL
56190	1999 FQ_{47}	—	March 20, 1999	Socorro	LINEAR	URS	11 km	MPC · JPL
56191	1999 FP_{49}	—	March 20, 1999	Socorro	LINEAR	PAD	8.9 km	MPC · JPL
56192	1999 FD_{59}	—	March 20, 1999	Socorro	LINEAR	·	3.7 km	MPC · JPL
56193	1999 GN_{1}	—	April 8, 1999	Oizumi	T. Kobayashi	EUN	3.1 km	MPC · JPL
56194	1999 GV_{5}	—	April 15, 1999	Reedy Creek	J. Broughton	·	5.2 km	MPC · JPL
56195	1999 GX_{6}	—	April 14, 1999	Socorro	LINEAR	·	9.1 km	MPC · JPL
56196	1999 GF_{7}	—	April 13, 1999	Xinglong	SCAP	·	3.2 km	MPC · JPL
56197	1999 GF_{8}	—	April 9, 1999	Anderson Mesa	LONEOS	·	7.9 km	MPC · JPL
56198	1999 GB_{9}	—	April 10, 1999	Anderson Mesa	LONEOS	EUN	4.0 km	MPC · JPL
56199	1999 GG_{11}	—	April 11, 1999	Kitt Peak	Spacewatch	EUN	3.3 km	MPC · JPL
56200	1999 GU_{16}	—	April 15, 1999	Socorro	LINEAR	EUN	5.5 km	MPC · JPL

== 56201–56300 ==
back to top

Designation			Discovery			Properties		Ref
Permanent	Provisional	Named after	Date	Site	Discoverer(s)	Category	Diam.	Ref
56201	1999 GD_{17}	—	April 15, 1999	Socorro	LINEAR	·	5.7 km	MPC · JPL
56202	1999 GA_{19}	—	April 15, 1999	Socorro	LINEAR	MAR	4.5 km	MPC · JPL
56203	1999 GU_{20}	—	April 15, 1999	Socorro	LINEAR	MAR	4.9 km	MPC · JPL
56204	1999 GQ_{22}	—	April 6, 1999	Socorro	LINEAR	·	4.0 km	MPC · JPL
56205	1999 GX_{23}	—	April 6, 1999	Socorro	LINEAR	·	3.2 km	MPC · JPL
56206	1999 GU_{34}	—	April 6, 1999	Socorro	LINEAR	·	4.6 km	MPC · JPL
56207	1999 GU_{35}	—	April 7, 1999	Socorro	LINEAR	·	4.1 km	MPC · JPL
56208	1999 GY_{35}	—	April 7, 1999	Socorro	LINEAR	EOS	6.2 km	MPC · JPL
56209	1999 GB_{37}	—	April 10, 1999	Socorro	LINEAR	EUN	3.9 km	MPC · JPL
56210	1999 GX_{41}	—	April 12, 1999	Socorro	LINEAR	·	4.4 km	MPC · JPL
56211	1999 GG_{43}	—	April 12, 1999	Socorro	LINEAR	·	7.6 km	MPC · JPL
56212	1999 GJ_{45}	—	April 12, 1999	Socorro	LINEAR	EUN	4.6 km	MPC · JPL
56213	1999 GW_{50}	—	April 10, 1999	Anderson Mesa	LONEOS	·	5.5 km	MPC · JPL
56214	1999 GC_{61}	—	April 15, 1999	Socorro	LINEAR	·	3.0 km	MPC · JPL
56215	1999 HH	—	April 17, 1999	Prescott	P. G. Comba	·	5.5 km	MPC · JPL
56216	1999 HJ_{2}	—	April 19, 1999	Majorca	Á. López J., R. Pacheco	·	4.3 km	MPC · JPL
56217	1999 HH_{3}	—	April 25, 1999	Gekko	T. Kagawa	EUN	4.4 km	MPC · JPL
56218	1999 HP_{4}	—	April 26, 1999	Woomera	F. B. Zoltowski	·	3.2 km	MPC · JPL
56219	1999 HP_{6}	—	April 19, 1999	Kitt Peak	Spacewatch	·	3.6 km	MPC · JPL
56220	1999 HC_{11}	—	April 17, 1999	Socorro	LINEAR	EOS	6.9 km	MPC · JPL
56221	1999 JK_{7}	—	May 8, 1999	Catalina	CSS	EOS	4.3 km	MPC · JPL
56222	1999 JF_{9}	—	May 7, 1999	Catalina	CSS	·	4.7 km	MPC · JPL
56223	1999 JP_{10}	—	May 8, 1999	Catalina	CSS	·	4.7 km	MPC · JPL
56224	1999 JE_{12}	—	May 13, 1999	Socorro	LINEAR	·	4.9 km	MPC · JPL
56225	1999 JL_{19}	—	May 10, 1999	Socorro	LINEAR	·	3.7 km	MPC · JPL
56226	1999 JQ_{23}	—	May 10, 1999	Socorro	LINEAR	·	5.7 km	MPC · JPL
56227	1999 JT_{23}	—	May 10, 1999	Socorro	LINEAR	PAD	7.3 km	MPC · JPL
56228	1999 JX_{24}	—	May 10, 1999	Socorro	LINEAR	·	4.8 km	MPC · JPL
56229	1999 JY_{27}	—	May 10, 1999	Socorro	LINEAR	·	3.9 km	MPC · JPL
56230	1999 JJ_{28}	—	May 10, 1999	Socorro	LINEAR	·	3.3 km	MPC · JPL
56231	1999 JZ_{30}	—	May 10, 1999	Socorro	LINEAR	·	5.7 km	MPC · JPL
56232	1999 JM_{31}	—	May 10, 1999	Socorro	LINEAR	·	2.4 km	MPC · JPL
56233	1999 JK_{42}	—	May 10, 1999	Socorro	LINEAR	WAT	5.3 km	MPC · JPL
56234	1999 JL_{42}	—	May 10, 1999	Socorro	LINEAR	·	3.5 km	MPC · JPL
56235	1999 JX_{43}	—	May 10, 1999	Socorro	LINEAR	·	3.9 km	MPC · JPL
56236	1999 JP_{44}	—	May 10, 1999	Socorro	LINEAR	·	4.7 km	MPC · JPL
56237	1999 JB_{45}	—	May 10, 1999	Socorro	LINEAR	·	5.0 km	MPC · JPL
56238	1999 JA_{46}	—	May 10, 1999	Socorro	LINEAR	(5)	3.7 km	MPC · JPL
56239	1999 JO_{46}	—	May 10, 1999	Socorro	LINEAR	·	4.0 km	MPC · JPL
56240	1999 JV_{51}	—	May 10, 1999	Socorro	LINEAR	·	4.1 km	MPC · JPL
56241	1999 JU_{53}	—	May 10, 1999	Socorro	LINEAR	·	4.6 km	MPC · JPL
56242	1999 JZ_{55}	—	May 10, 1999	Socorro	LINEAR	·	4.3 km	MPC · JPL
56243	1999 JZ_{60}	—	May 10, 1999	Socorro	LINEAR	slow	8.8 km	MPC · JPL
56244	1999 JH_{62}	—	May 10, 1999	Socorro	LINEAR	·	3.4 km	MPC · JPL
56245	1999 JZ_{69}	—	May 12, 1999	Socorro	LINEAR	·	5.4 km	MPC · JPL
56246	1999 JK_{72}	—	May 12, 1999	Socorro	LINEAR	·	4.2 km	MPC · JPL
56247	1999 JZ_{72}	—	May 12, 1999	Socorro	LINEAR	·	2.7 km	MPC · JPL
56248	1999 JQ_{74}	—	May 12, 1999	Socorro	LINEAR	·	3.2 km	MPC · JPL
56249	1999 JS_{74}	—	May 12, 1999	Socorro	LINEAR	·	9.5 km	MPC · JPL
56250	1999 JE_{76}	—	May 10, 1999	Socorro	LINEAR	·	3.0 km	MPC · JPL
56251	1999 JR_{77}	—	May 12, 1999	Socorro	LINEAR	·	4.5 km	MPC · JPL
56252	1999 JF_{78}	—	May 13, 1999	Socorro	LINEAR	·	5.2 km	MPC · JPL
56253	1999 JH_{79}	—	May 13, 1999	Socorro	LINEAR	·	4.3 km	MPC · JPL
56254	1999 JO_{81}	—	May 12, 1999	Socorro	LINEAR	EUN	3.4 km	MPC · JPL
56255	1999 JV_{81}	—	May 12, 1999	Socorro	LINEAR	DOR ·	6.6 km	MPC · JPL
56256	1999 JO_{82}	—	May 12, 1999	Socorro	LINEAR	·	6.0 km	MPC · JPL
56257	1999 JZ_{82}	—	May 12, 1999	Socorro	LINEAR	·	7.2 km	MPC · JPL
56258	1999 JH_{83}	—	May 12, 1999	Socorro	LINEAR	·	3.9 km	MPC · JPL
56259	1999 JY_{86}	—	May 12, 1999	Socorro	LINEAR	ADE	4.9 km	MPC · JPL
56260	1999 JL_{87}	—	May 12, 1999	Socorro	LINEAR	EUN	4.1 km	MPC · JPL
56261	1999 JT_{87}	—	May 12, 1999	Socorro	LINEAR	ADE	6.4 km	MPC · JPL
56262	1999 JE_{89}	—	May 12, 1999	Socorro	LINEAR	·	4.1 km	MPC · JPL
56263	1999 JF_{95}	—	May 12, 1999	Socorro	LINEAR	WAT	6.8 km	MPC · JPL
56264	1999 JV_{95}	—	May 12, 1999	Socorro	LINEAR	EOS	4.6 km	MPC · JPL
56265	1999 JD_{96}	—	May 12, 1999	Socorro	LINEAR	·	7.5 km	MPC · JPL
56266	1999 JJ_{97}	—	May 12, 1999	Socorro	LINEAR	EOS	5.3 km	MPC · JPL
56267	1999 JW_{97}	—	May 12, 1999	Socorro	LINEAR	·	3.3 km	MPC · JPL
56268	1999 JN_{98}	—	May 12, 1999	Socorro	LINEAR	·	4.7 km	MPC · JPL
56269	1999 JB_{100}	—	May 12, 1999	Socorro	LINEAR	DOR	6.2 km	MPC · JPL
56270	1999 JD_{100}	—	May 12, 1999	Socorro	LINEAR	EOS	4.1 km	MPC · JPL
56271	1999 JK_{102}	—	May 13, 1999	Socorro	LINEAR	·	3.1 km	MPC · JPL
56272	1999 JS_{103}	—	May 13, 1999	Socorro	LINEAR	·	5.4 km	MPC · JPL
56273	1999 JZ_{103}	—	May 14, 1999	Socorro	LINEAR	·	5.0 km	MPC · JPL
56274	1999 JM_{104}	—	May 15, 1999	Socorro	LINEAR	·	6.2 km	MPC · JPL
56275	1999 JK_{117}	—	May 13, 1999	Socorro	LINEAR	·	5.9 km	MPC · JPL
56276	1999 JY_{123}	—	May 14, 1999	Socorro	LINEAR	·	5.7 km	MPC · JPL
56277	1999 JU_{129}	—	May 12, 1999	Socorro	LINEAR	·	4.1 km	MPC · JPL
56278	1999 KB	—	May 16, 1999	Woomera	F. B. Zoltowski	·	5.9 km	MPC · JPL
56279	1999 KD_{1}	—	May 17, 1999	Catalina	CSS	·	5.3 km	MPC · JPL
56280 Asemo	1999 KS_{5}	Asemo	May 22, 1999	Oaxaca	Roe, J. M.	·	4.1 km	MPC · JPL
56281	1999 KQ_{7}	—	May 18, 1999	Socorro	LINEAR	·	5.2 km	MPC · JPL
56282	1999 KU_{13}	—	May 18, 1999	Socorro	LINEAR	EUN	3.9 km	MPC · JPL
56283	1999 LU_{1}	—	June 4, 1999	Socorro	LINEAR	PHO	3.8 km	MPC · JPL
56284	1999 LA_{2}	—	June 5, 1999	Nachi-Katsuura	Y. Shimizu, T. Urata	·	7.2 km	MPC · JPL
56285	1999 LJ_{3}	—	June 6, 1999	Kitt Peak	Spacewatch	KOR	3.3 km	MPC · JPL
56286	1999 LG_{9}	—	June 8, 1999	Socorro	LINEAR	EUP	11 km	MPC · JPL
56287	1999 LM_{10}	—	June 8, 1999	Socorro	LINEAR	·	3.7 km	MPC · JPL
56288	1999 LS_{11}	—	June 9, 1999	Socorro	LINEAR	·	5.3 km	MPC · JPL
56289	1999 LM_{26}	—	June 9, 1999	Socorro	LINEAR	PHO	2.6 km	MPC · JPL
56290	1999 LX_{32}	—	June 8, 1999	Catalina	CSS	·	7.7 km	MPC · JPL
56291	1999 NG_{3}	—	July 13, 1999	Socorro	LINEAR	·	4.6 km	MPC · JPL
56292	1999 NK_{40}	—	July 14, 1999	Socorro	LINEAR	·	3.2 km	MPC · JPL
56293	1999 NH_{44}	—	July 13, 1999	Socorro	LINEAR	·	4.4 km	MPC · JPL
56294	1999 NF_{47}	—	July 13, 1999	Socorro	LINEAR	·	5.8 km	MPC · JPL
56295	1999 NB_{54}	—	July 12, 1999	Socorro	LINEAR	slow	2.9 km	MPC · JPL
56296	1999 RU_{39}	—	September 7, 1999	Catalina	CSS	·	2.8 km	MPC · JPL
56297	1999 RT_{42}	—	September 12, 1999	Črni Vrh	Mikuž, H.	LUT	13 km	MPC · JPL
56298	1999 RO_{46}	—	September 7, 1999	Socorro	LINEAR	·	9.1 km	MPC · JPL
56299	1999 RT_{47}	—	September 7, 1999	Socorro	LINEAR	·	11 km	MPC · JPL
56300	1999 RB_{60}	—	September 7, 1999	Socorro	LINEAR	·	6.9 km	MPC · JPL

== 56301–56400 ==
back to top

Designation			Discovery			Properties		Ref
Permanent	Provisional	Named after	Date	Site	Discoverer(s)	Category	Diam.	Ref
56301	1999 RP_{60}	—	September 7, 1999	Socorro	LINEAR	slow	8.7 km	MPC · JPL
56302	1999 RW_{69}	—	September 7, 1999	Socorro	LINEAR	(11882)	3.3 km	MPC · JPL
56303	1999 RW_{98}	—	September 7, 1999	Socorro	LINEAR	·	10 km	MPC · JPL
56304	1999 RB_{119}	—	September 9, 1999	Socorro	LINEAR	AEG	11 km	MPC · JPL
56305	1999 RX_{119}	—	September 9, 1999	Socorro	LINEAR	·	8.0 km	MPC · JPL
56306	1999 RL_{125}	—	September 9, 1999	Socorro	LINEAR	URS	11 km	MPC · JPL
56307	1999 RY_{125}	—	September 9, 1999	Socorro	LINEAR	TIR ·	5.7 km	MPC · JPL
56308	1999 RH_{132}	—	September 9, 1999	Socorro	LINEAR	·	2.8 km	MPC · JPL
56309	1999 RW_{140}	—	September 9, 1999	Socorro	LINEAR	·	1.9 km	MPC · JPL
56310	1999 RE_{151}	—	September 9, 1999	Socorro	LINEAR	·	5.1 km	MPC · JPL
56311	1999 RA_{221}	—	September 5, 1999	Anderson Mesa	LONEOS	·	1.3 km	MPC · JPL
56312	1999 RM_{224}	—	September 7, 1999	Anderson Mesa	LONEOS	·	10 km	MPC · JPL
56313	1999 SV_{14}	—	September 29, 1999	Catalina	CSS	EUP	9.6 km	MPC · JPL
56314	1999 TZ_{97}	—	October 2, 1999	Socorro	LINEAR	·	9.3 km	MPC · JPL
56315	1999 TH_{121}	—	October 4, 1999	Socorro	LINEAR	LEO	3.7 km	MPC · JPL
56316	1999 TA_{227}	—	October 4, 1999	Catalina	CSS	·	2.0 km	MPC · JPL
56317	1999 TJ_{232}	—	October 5, 1999	Anderson Mesa	LONEOS	·	6.2 km	MPC · JPL
56318	1999 UR_{3}	—	October 20, 1999	La Silla	Kranz, T., Wolf, C.	H	1.8 km	MPC · JPL
56319	1999 UM_{10}	—	October 31, 1999	Socorro	LINEAR	H	1.6 km	MPC · JPL
56320	1999 VB_{49}	—	November 3, 1999	Socorro	LINEAR	·	1.8 km	MPC · JPL
56321	1999 VB_{53}	—	November 3, 1999	Socorro	LINEAR	H	3.1 km	MPC · JPL
56322	1999 VH_{68}	—	November 4, 1999	Socorro	LINEAR	NYS	2.4 km	MPC · JPL
56323	1999 VE_{82}	—	November 5, 1999	Socorro	LINEAR	·	13 km	MPC · JPL
56324	1999 VY_{175}	—	November 2, 1999	Catalina	CSS	EOS	8.8 km	MPC · JPL
56325	1999 VT_{179}	—	November 6, 1999	Socorro	LINEAR	·	12 km	MPC · JPL
56326	1999 VV_{203}	—	November 9, 1999	Anderson Mesa	LONEOS	·	19 km	MPC · JPL
56327	1999 VH_{215}	—	November 3, 1999	Socorro	LINEAR	·	9.7 km	MPC · JPL
56328	1999 WE	—	November 17, 1999	High Point	D. K. Chesney	H	1.3 km	MPC · JPL
56329 Tarxien	1999 WO_{1}	Tarxien	November 28, 1999	Kleť	J. Tichá, M. Tichý	V	1.1 km	MPC · JPL
56330	1999 XS_{12}	—	December 5, 1999	Socorro	LINEAR	·	3.7 km	MPC · JPL
56331	1999 XD_{33}	—	December 6, 1999	Socorro	LINEAR	·	5.2 km	MPC · JPL
56332	1999 XR_{34}	—	December 6, 1999	Socorro	LINEAR	·	2.0 km	MPC · JPL
56333	1999 XU_{100}	—	December 7, 1999	Socorro	LINEAR	NYS	6.7 km	MPC · JPL
56334	1999 XN_{101}	—	December 7, 1999	Socorro	LINEAR	H	1.5 km	MPC · JPL
56335	1999 XO_{111}	—	December 8, 1999	Catalina	CSS	EUN	5.2 km	MPC · JPL
56336	1999 XL_{126}	—	December 7, 1999	Catalina	CSS	·	3.0 km	MPC · JPL
56337	1999 XG_{136}	—	December 13, 1999	Socorro	LINEAR	H	1.9 km	MPC · JPL
56338	1999 XS_{162}	—	December 8, 1999	Catalina	CSS	H	2.0 km	MPC · JPL
56339	1999 XV_{169}	—	December 10, 1999	Socorro	LINEAR	·	2.0 km	MPC · JPL
56340	1999 XE_{176}	—	December 10, 1999	Socorro	LINEAR	·	2.8 km	MPC · JPL
56341	1999 XS_{221}	—	December 15, 1999	Socorro	LINEAR	SYL · CYB	12 km	MPC · JPL
56342	1999 XW_{238}	—	December 5, 1999	Kitt Peak	Spacewatch	·	1.5 km	MPC · JPL
56343	1999 YG	—	December 16, 1999	Socorro	LINEAR	H	2.0 km	MPC · JPL
56344	1999 YV_{17}	—	December 29, 1999	Socorro	LINEAR	H	1.4 km	MPC · JPL
56345	2000 AN_{41}	—	January 3, 2000	Socorro	LINEAR	·	2.0 km	MPC · JPL
56346	2000 AK_{64}	—	January 4, 2000	Socorro	LINEAR	·	2.4 km	MPC · JPL
56347	2000 AU_{64}	—	January 4, 2000	Socorro	LINEAR	·	5.2 km	MPC · JPL
56348	2000 AH_{69}	—	January 5, 2000	Socorro	LINEAR	·	2.0 km	MPC · JPL
56349	2000 AZ_{90}	—	January 5, 2000	Socorro	LINEAR	ERI	4.4 km	MPC · JPL
56350	2000 AB_{92}	—	January 5, 2000	Socorro	LINEAR	·	6.2 km	MPC · JPL
56351	2000 AN_{93}	—	January 4, 2000	Socorro	LINEAR	H	1.9 km	MPC · JPL
56352	2000 AR_{93}	—	January 6, 2000	Socorro	LINEAR	H	1.5 km	MPC · JPL
56353	2000 AB_{103}	—	January 5, 2000	Socorro	LINEAR	·	6.3 km	MPC · JPL
56354	2000 AF_{129}	—	January 5, 2000	Socorro	LINEAR	·	2.3 km	MPC · JPL
56355	2000 AX_{130}	—	January 6, 2000	Socorro	LINEAR	L4	18 km	MPC · JPL
56356	2000 AY_{138}	—	January 5, 2000	Socorro	LINEAR	·	3.3 km	MPC · JPL
56357	2000 AS_{143}	—	January 5, 2000	Socorro	LINEAR	·	1.5 km	MPC · JPL
56358	2000 AR_{201}	—	January 9, 2000	Socorro	LINEAR	H	1.5 km	MPC · JPL
56359	2000 AZ_{228}	—	January 7, 2000	Anderson Mesa	LONEOS	·	4.8 km	MPC · JPL
56360	2000 AP_{239}	—	January 6, 2000	Socorro	LINEAR	H	2.2 km	MPC · JPL
56361 Marcomontagni	2000 CW_{1}	Marcomontagni	February 4, 2000	San Marcello	A. Boattini, M. Tombelli	·	2.7 km	MPC · JPL
56362	2000 CG_{56}	—	February 4, 2000	Socorro	LINEAR	·	1.8 km	MPC · JPL
56363	2000 CP_{93}	—	February 8, 2000	Socorro	LINEAR	·	3.2 km	MPC · JPL
56364	2000 CU_{116}	—	February 3, 2000	Socorro	LINEAR	V	1.5 km	MPC · JPL
56365	2000 DG_{54}	—	February 29, 2000	Socorro	LINEAR	·	3.7 km	MPC · JPL
56366	2000 DO_{69}	—	February 29, 2000	Socorro	LINEAR	·	1.5 km	MPC · JPL
56367	2000 EF	—	March 1, 2000	Oizumi	T. Kobayashi	·	6.4 km	MPC · JPL
56368	2000 EU_{5}	—	March 2, 2000	Kitt Peak	Spacewatch	·	1.6 km	MPC · JPL
56369	2000 EW_{6}	—	March 2, 2000	Kitt Peak	Spacewatch	·	1.9 km	MPC · JPL
56370	2000 EV_{7}	—	March 2, 2000	Višnjan Observatory	K. Korlević	V	2.1 km	MPC · JPL
56371	2000 EC_{15}	—	March 5, 2000	Reedy Creek	J. Broughton	·	3.5 km	MPC · JPL
56372	2000 EX_{19}	—	March 7, 2000	Socorro	LINEAR	·	2.4 km	MPC · JPL
56373	2000 EF_{20}	—	March 1, 2000	Catalina	CSS	·	2.1 km	MPC · JPL
56374	2000 EM_{24}	—	March 8, 2000	Kitt Peak	Spacewatch	·	1.6 km	MPC · JPL
56375	2000 EJ_{25}	—	March 8, 2000	Kitt Peak	Spacewatch	·	3.0 km	MPC · JPL
56376	2000 EE_{33}	—	March 5, 2000	Socorro	LINEAR	V	2.1 km	MPC · JPL
56377	2000 EU_{35}	—	March 8, 2000	Socorro	LINEAR	·	2.2 km	MPC · JPL
56378	2000 ED_{37}	—	March 8, 2000	Socorro	LINEAR	·	2.1 km	MPC · JPL
56379	2000 EU_{42}	—	March 8, 2000	Socorro	LINEAR	(2076)	2.2 km	MPC · JPL
56380	2000 EJ_{43}	—	March 8, 2000	Socorro	LINEAR	·	1.6 km	MPC · JPL
56381	2000 EN_{43}	—	March 8, 2000	Socorro	LINEAR	·	1.6 km	MPC · JPL
56382	2000 ES_{43}	—	March 8, 2000	Socorro	LINEAR	·	1.9 km	MPC · JPL
56383	2000 EJ_{47}	—	March 9, 2000	Socorro	LINEAR	·	2.0 km	MPC · JPL
56384	2000 EX_{47}	—	March 9, 2000	Socorro	LINEAR	V	2.2 km	MPC · JPL
56385	2000 EN_{48}	—	March 9, 2000	Socorro	LINEAR	·	1.8 km	MPC · JPL
56386	2000 EG_{54}	—	March 9, 2000	Kitt Peak	Spacewatch	·	1.9 km	MPC · JPL
56387	2000 EA_{64}	—	March 10, 2000	Socorro	LINEAR	·	1.8 km	MPC · JPL
56388	2000 EN_{69}	—	March 10, 2000	Socorro	LINEAR	·	2.3 km	MPC · JPL
56389	2000 EB_{87}	—	March 8, 2000	Socorro	LINEAR	·	1.8 km	MPC · JPL
56390	2000 EH_{91}	—	March 9, 2000	Socorro	LINEAR	·	2.3 km	MPC · JPL
56391	2000 ET_{97}	—	March 11, 2000	Socorro	LINEAR	·	2.2 km	MPC · JPL
56392	2000 ET_{106}	—	March 15, 2000	Reedy Creek	J. Broughton	·	1.9 km	MPC · JPL
56393	2000 ER_{120}	—	March 11, 2000	Anderson Mesa	LONEOS	·	2.2 km	MPC · JPL
56394	2000 EB_{126}	—	March 11, 2000	Anderson Mesa	LONEOS	V	1.7 km	MPC · JPL
56395	2000 EV_{126}	—	March 11, 2000	Anderson Mesa	LONEOS	·	2.4 km	MPC · JPL
56396	2000 EX_{129}	—	March 11, 2000	Anderson Mesa	LONEOS	·	7.4 km	MPC · JPL
56397	2000 EN_{134}	—	March 11, 2000	Anderson Mesa	LONEOS	·	2.2 km	MPC · JPL
56398	2000 EW_{134}	—	March 11, 2000	Anderson Mesa	LONEOS	·	1.8 km	MPC · JPL
56399	2000 EU_{135}	—	March 11, 2000	Anderson Mesa	LONEOS	·	3.2 km	MPC · JPL
56400	2000 EF_{140}	—	March 5, 2000	Socorro	LINEAR	EOS	6.7 km	MPC · JPL

== 56401–56500 ==
back to top

Designation			Discovery			Properties		Ref
Permanent	Provisional	Named after	Date	Site	Discoverer(s)	Category	Diam.	Ref
56401	2000 EN_{155}	—	March 9, 2000	Socorro	LINEAR	·	5.4 km	MPC · JPL
56402	2000 ET_{157}	—	March 12, 2000	Anderson Mesa	LONEOS	·	3.4 km	MPC · JPL
56403	2000 FL	—	March 25, 2000	Oizumi	T. Kobayashi	slow	2.2 km	MPC · JPL
56404	2000 FC_{12}	—	March 28, 2000	Socorro	LINEAR	·	4.2 km	MPC · JPL
56405	2000 FH_{17}	—	March 28, 2000	Socorro	LINEAR	·	1.9 km	MPC · JPL
56406	2000 FZ_{20}	—	March 29, 2000	Socorro	LINEAR	PHO	2.5 km	MPC · JPL
56407	2000 FA_{22}	—	March 29, 2000	Socorro	LINEAR	·	1.8 km	MPC · JPL
56408	2000 FH_{22}	—	March 29, 2000	Socorro	LINEAR	·	1.8 km	MPC · JPL
56409	2000 FQ_{29}	—	March 27, 2000	Anderson Mesa	LONEOS	·	1.3 km	MPC · JPL
56410	2000 FZ_{34}	—	March 29, 2000	Socorro	LINEAR	·	1.5 km	MPC · JPL
56411	2000 FE_{35}	—	March 29, 2000	Socorro	LINEAR	·	2.1 km	MPC · JPL
56412	2000 FM_{40}	—	March 29, 2000	Socorro	LINEAR	·	1.9 km	MPC · JPL
56413	2000 FU_{40}	—	March 29, 2000	Socorro	LINEAR	·	3.1 km	MPC · JPL
56414	2000 FK_{42}	—	March 29, 2000	Socorro	LINEAR	·	1.8 km	MPC · JPL
56415	2000 FR_{46}	—	March 29, 2000	Socorro	LINEAR	·	2.8 km	MPC · JPL
56416	2000 FS_{55}	—	March 29, 2000	Socorro	LINEAR	·	1.7 km	MPC · JPL
56417	2000 FO_{58}	—	March 26, 2000	Anderson Mesa	LONEOS	V	1.8 km	MPC · JPL
56418	2000 FL_{59}	—	March 29, 2000	Socorro	LINEAR	·	2.0 km	MPC · JPL
56419	2000 FM_{59}	—	March 29, 2000	Socorro	LINEAR	·	1.6 km	MPC · JPL
56420	2000 FX_{60}	—	March 29, 2000	Socorro	LINEAR	V	1.6 km	MPC · JPL
56421	2000 GV_{2}	—	April 3, 2000	Socorro	LINEAR	·	2.2 km	MPC · JPL
56422 Mnajdra	2000 GV_{3}	Mnajdra	April 2, 2000	Kleť	J. Tichá, M. Tichý	·	4.0 km	MPC · JPL
56423	2000 GW_{3}	—	April 2, 2000	Kleť	Kleť	·	2.7 km	MPC · JPL
56424	2000 GG_{5}	—	April 4, 2000	Socorro	LINEAR	·	2.2 km	MPC · JPL
56425	2000 GZ_{7}	—	April 4, 2000	Socorro	LINEAR	·	5.1 km	MPC · JPL
56426	2000 GW_{24}	—	April 5, 2000	Socorro	LINEAR	·	1.8 km	MPC · JPL
56427	2000 GO_{27}	—	April 5, 2000	Socorro	LINEAR	KOR	2.8 km	MPC · JPL
56428	2000 GT_{27}	—	April 5, 2000	Socorro	LINEAR	·	2.3 km	MPC · JPL
56429	2000 GY_{27}	—	April 5, 2000	Socorro	LINEAR	·	1.5 km	MPC · JPL
56430	2000 GP_{29}	—	April 5, 2000	Socorro	LINEAR	NYS	3.3 km	MPC · JPL
56431	2000 GX_{33}	—	April 5, 2000	Socorro	LINEAR	·	2.9 km	MPC · JPL
56432	2000 GY_{33}	—	April 5, 2000	Socorro	LINEAR	NYS	2.8 km	MPC · JPL
56433	2000 GR_{34}	—	April 12, 2000	Socorro	LINEAR	·	7.4 km	MPC · JPL
56434	2000 GN_{38}	—	April 5, 2000	Socorro	LINEAR	·	3.8 km	MPC · JPL
56435	2000 GQ_{38}	—	April 5, 2000	Socorro	LINEAR	NYS	3.8 km	MPC · JPL
56436	2000 GZ_{46}	—	April 5, 2000	Socorro	LINEAR	(883)	2.9 km	MPC · JPL
56437	2000 GT_{48}	—	April 5, 2000	Socorro	LINEAR	V	1.7 km	MPC · JPL
56438	2000 GV_{49}	—	April 5, 2000	Socorro	LINEAR	·	2.4 km	MPC · JPL
56439	2000 GD_{52}	—	April 5, 2000	Socorro	LINEAR	·	2.7 km	MPC · JPL
56440	2000 GY_{52}	—	April 5, 2000	Socorro	LINEAR	·	2.0 km	MPC · JPL
56441	2000 GW_{54}	—	April 5, 2000	Socorro	LINEAR	·	1.7 km	MPC · JPL
56442	2000 GP_{66}	—	April 5, 2000	Socorro	LINEAR	·	5.0 km	MPC · JPL
56443	2000 GX_{67}	—	April 5, 2000	Socorro	LINEAR	·	2.4 km	MPC · JPL
56444	2000 GB_{68}	—	April 5, 2000	Socorro	LINEAR	·	3.6 km	MPC · JPL
56445	2000 GN_{71}	—	April 5, 2000	Socorro	LINEAR	·	2.3 km	MPC · JPL
56446	2000 GF_{74}	—	April 5, 2000	Socorro	LINEAR	·	4.4 km	MPC · JPL
56447	2000 GR_{76}	—	April 5, 2000	Socorro	LINEAR	·	1.8 km	MPC · JPL
56448	2000 GY_{76}	—	April 5, 2000	Socorro	LINEAR	·	1.8 km	MPC · JPL
56449	2000 GS_{78}	—	April 5, 2000	Socorro	LINEAR	·	1.4 km	MPC · JPL
56450	2000 GU_{80}	—	April 7, 2000	Socorro	LINEAR	·	6.4 km	MPC · JPL
56451	2000 GN_{81}	—	April 6, 2000	Socorro	LINEAR	NYS	6.0 km	MPC · JPL
56452	2000 GU_{86}	—	April 4, 2000	Socorro	LINEAR	·	5.3 km	MPC · JPL
56453	2000 GG_{87}	—	April 4, 2000	Socorro	LINEAR	·	2.9 km	MPC · JPL
56454	2000 GM_{87}	—	April 4, 2000	Socorro	LINEAR	·	2.1 km	MPC · JPL
56455	2000 GW_{87}	—	April 4, 2000	Socorro	LINEAR	·	2.2 km	MPC · JPL
56456	2000 GE_{89}	—	April 4, 2000	Socorro	LINEAR	·	4.3 km	MPC · JPL
56457	2000 GE_{95}	—	April 6, 2000	Socorro	LINEAR	·	2.0 km	MPC · JPL
56458	2000 GA_{96}	—	April 6, 2000	Socorro	LINEAR	·	2.0 km	MPC · JPL
56459	2000 GD_{96}	—	April 6, 2000	Socorro	LINEAR	·	2.0 km	MPC · JPL
56460	2000 GE_{96}	—	April 6, 2000	Socorro	LINEAR	·	2.5 km	MPC · JPL
56461	2000 GX_{96}	—	April 6, 2000	Socorro	LINEAR	PHO	3.5 km	MPC · JPL
56462	2000 GN_{97}	—	April 7, 2000	Socorro	LINEAR	NYS	3.3 km	MPC · JPL
56463	2000 GD_{98}	—	April 7, 2000	Socorro	LINEAR	V	2.3 km	MPC · JPL
56464	2000 GE_{98}	—	April 7, 2000	Socorro	LINEAR	·	1.7 km	MPC · JPL
56465	2000 GS_{98}	—	April 7, 2000	Socorro	LINEAR	·	1.9 km	MPC · JPL
56466	2000 GZ_{99}	—	April 7, 2000	Socorro	LINEAR	·	1.7 km	MPC · JPL
56467	2000 GP_{103}	—	April 7, 2000	Socorro	LINEAR	·	1.5 km	MPC · JPL
56468	2000 GO_{104}	—	April 7, 2000	Socorro	LINEAR	NYS	4.0 km	MPC · JPL
56469	2000 GN_{105}	—	April 7, 2000	Socorro	LINEAR	·	1.9 km	MPC · JPL
56470	2000 GH_{106}	—	April 7, 2000	Socorro	LINEAR	·	1.8 km	MPC · JPL
56471	2000 GX_{106}	—	April 7, 2000	Socorro	LINEAR	PHO	3.8 km	MPC · JPL
56472	2000 GB_{108}	—	April 7, 2000	Socorro	LINEAR	·	1.6 km	MPC · JPL
56473	2000 GY_{108}	—	April 7, 2000	Socorro	LINEAR	·	2.0 km	MPC · JPL
56474	2000 GA_{109}	—	April 7, 2000	Socorro	LINEAR	·	1.6 km	MPC · JPL
56475	2000 GN_{109}	—	April 7, 2000	Socorro	LINEAR	·	1.3 km	MPC · JPL
56476	2000 GU_{110}	—	April 2, 2000	Anderson Mesa	LONEOS	(2076)	2.9 km	MPC · JPL
56477	2000 GM_{111}	—	April 3, 2000	Anderson Mesa	LONEOS	·	2.6 km	MPC · JPL
56478	2000 GS_{111}	—	April 3, 2000	Anderson Mesa	LONEOS	·	1.8 km	MPC · JPL
56479	2000 GT_{114}	—	April 7, 2000	Socorro	LINEAR	·	6.5 km	MPC · JPL
56480	2000 GU_{114}	—	April 7, 2000	Socorro	LINEAR	·	1.9 km	MPC · JPL
56481	2000 GW_{114}	—	April 7, 2000	Socorro	LINEAR	·	2.8 km	MPC · JPL
56482	2000 GY_{115}	—	April 8, 2000	Socorro	LINEAR	·	2.3 km	MPC · JPL
56483	2000 GY_{121}	—	April 6, 2000	Kitt Peak	Spacewatch	V	1.3 km	MPC · JPL
56484	2000 GH_{124}	—	April 7, 2000	Socorro	LINEAR	·	2.8 km	MPC · JPL
56485	2000 GL_{125}	—	April 7, 2000	Socorro	LINEAR	·	7.8 km	MPC · JPL
56486	2000 GF_{126}	—	April 7, 2000	Socorro	LINEAR	V	2.7 km	MPC · JPL
56487	2000 GR_{126}	—	April 7, 2000	Socorro	LINEAR	·	2.7 km	MPC · JPL
56488	2000 GQ_{131}	—	April 7, 2000	Kitt Peak	Spacewatch	·	3.7 km	MPC · JPL
56489	2000 GT_{131}	—	April 7, 2000	Kitt Peak	Spacewatch	·	3.7 km	MPC · JPL
56490	2000 GD_{133}	—	April 12, 2000	Haleakala	NEAT	·	5.5 km	MPC · JPL
56491	2000 GS_{133}	—	April 7, 2000	Socorro	LINEAR	·	2.3 km	MPC · JPL
56492	2000 GH_{134}	—	April 7, 2000	Socorro	LINEAR	·	3.5 km	MPC · JPL
56493	2000 GU_{134}	—	April 8, 2000	Socorro	LINEAR	·	3.2 km	MPC · JPL
56494	2000 GA_{136}	—	April 12, 2000	Socorro	LINEAR	V	2.0 km	MPC · JPL
56495	2000 GW_{137}	—	April 4, 2000	Anderson Mesa	LONEOS	·	2.3 km	MPC · JPL
56496	2000 GE_{138}	—	April 4, 2000	Anderson Mesa	LONEOS	·	2.1 km	MPC · JPL
56497	2000 GD_{140}	—	April 4, 2000	Anderson Mesa	LONEOS	·	2.2 km	MPC · JPL
56498	2000 GU_{140}	—	April 4, 2000	Anderson Mesa	LONEOS	·	1.9 km	MPC · JPL
56499	2000 GM_{143}	—	April 7, 2000	Anderson Mesa	LONEOS	·	2.6 km	MPC · JPL
56500	2000 GV_{143}	—	April 7, 2000	Anderson Mesa	LONEOS	·	3.0 km	MPC · JPL

== 56501–56600 ==
back to top

Designation			Discovery			Properties		Ref
Permanent	Provisional	Named after	Date	Site	Discoverer(s)	Category	Diam.	Ref
56501	2000 GG_{153}	—	April 6, 2000	Anderson Mesa	LONEOS	·	2.0 km	MPC · JPL
56502	2000 GY_{158}	—	April 7, 2000	Socorro	LINEAR	·	3.3 km	MPC · JPL
56503	2000 GR_{159}	—	April 7, 2000	Socorro	LINEAR	·	2.8 km	MPC · JPL
56504	2000 GT_{166}	—	April 5, 2000	Socorro	LINEAR	·	3.0 km	MPC · JPL
56505	2000 GV_{171}	—	April 2, 2000	Anderson Mesa	LONEOS	·	1.4 km	MPC · JPL
56506	2000 GH_{174}	—	April 5, 2000	Anderson Mesa	LONEOS	·	3.6 km	MPC · JPL
56507	2000 GU_{178}	—	April 4, 2000	Anderson Mesa	LONEOS	V	1.9 km	MPC · JPL
56508	2000 HG_{6}	—	April 24, 2000	Kitt Peak	Spacewatch	·	2.8 km	MPC · JPL
56509	2000 HB_{7}	—	April 24, 2000	Kitt Peak	Spacewatch	V	1.7 km	MPC · JPL
56510	2000 HT_{8}	—	April 27, 2000	Socorro	LINEAR	·	2.4 km	MPC · JPL
56511	2000 HE_{11}	—	April 27, 2000	Socorro	LINEAR	NYS	3.1 km	MPC · JPL
56512	2000 HH_{11}	—	April 27, 2000	Socorro	LINEAR	·	2.7 km	MPC · JPL
56513	2000 HY_{12}	—	April 28, 2000	Socorro	LINEAR	(5)	3.6 km	MPC · JPL
56514	2000 HM_{18}	—	April 25, 2000	Kitt Peak	Spacewatch	EUN	3.0 km	MPC · JPL
56515	2000 HD_{20}	—	April 27, 2000	Kitt Peak	Spacewatch	V	1.6 km	MPC · JPL
56516	2000 HE_{20}	—	April 27, 2000	Kitt Peak	Spacewatch	V	1.8 km	MPC · JPL
56517	2000 HU_{20}	—	April 27, 2000	Socorro	LINEAR	·	1.8 km	MPC · JPL
56518	2000 HZ_{20}	—	April 27, 2000	Socorro	LINEAR	·	7.5 km	MPC · JPL
56519	2000 HB_{21}	—	April 27, 2000	Socorro	LINEAR	·	2.0 km	MPC · JPL
56520	2000 HO_{21}	—	April 28, 2000	Socorro	LINEAR	·	1.6 km	MPC · JPL
56521	2000 HE_{22}	—	April 29, 2000	Socorro	LINEAR	·	1.4 km	MPC · JPL
56522	2000 HT_{24}	—	April 24, 2000	Anderson Mesa	LONEOS	·	3.5 km	MPC · JPL
56523	2000 HX_{25}	—	April 24, 2000	Anderson Mesa	LONEOS	·	3.3 km	MPC · JPL
56524	2000 HT_{27}	—	April 28, 2000	Socorro	LINEAR	·	3.4 km	MPC · JPL
56525	2000 HY_{31}	—	April 29, 2000	Socorro	LINEAR	·	3.6 km	MPC · JPL
56526	2000 HP_{35}	—	April 27, 2000	Socorro	LINEAR	·	3.5 km	MPC · JPL
56527	2000 HF_{36}	—	April 28, 2000	Socorro	LINEAR	PHO	2.6 km	MPC · JPL
56528	2000 HF_{44}	—	April 26, 2000	Anderson Mesa	LONEOS	·	3.1 km	MPC · JPL
56529	2000 HY_{44}	—	April 26, 2000	Anderson Mesa	LONEOS	·	2.4 km	MPC · JPL
56530	2000 HK_{45}	—	April 26, 2000	Anderson Mesa	LONEOS	·	3.0 km	MPC · JPL
56531	2000 HF_{48}	—	April 29, 2000	Socorro	LINEAR	V	1.8 km	MPC · JPL
56532	2000 HB_{50}	—	April 29, 2000	Socorro	LINEAR	·	2.4 km	MPC · JPL
56533	2000 HY_{50}	—	April 29, 2000	Socorro	LINEAR	·	1.4 km	MPC · JPL
56534	2000 HH_{52}	—	April 29, 2000	Socorro	LINEAR	ERI	4.9 km	MPC · JPL
56535	2000 HT_{52}	—	April 29, 2000	Socorro	LINEAR	·	3.0 km	MPC · JPL
56536	2000 HO_{53}	—	April 29, 2000	Socorro	LINEAR	·	4.1 km	MPC · JPL
56537	2000 HQ_{53}	—	April 29, 2000	Socorro	LINEAR	(5)	4.1 km	MPC · JPL
56538	2000 HF_{54}	—	April 29, 2000	Socorro	LINEAR	·	3.0 km	MPC · JPL
56539	2000 HT_{58}	—	April 25, 2000	Anderson Mesa	LONEOS	·	2.0 km	MPC · JPL
56540	2000 HC_{61}	—	April 25, 2000	Anderson Mesa	LONEOS	·	1.5 km	MPC · JPL
56541	2000 HR_{61}	—	April 25, 2000	Anderson Mesa	LONEOS	·	2.5 km	MPC · JPL
56542	2000 HJ_{63}	—	April 26, 2000	Anderson Mesa	LONEOS	MAS	2.2 km	MPC · JPL
56543	2000 HT_{64}	—	April 26, 2000	Anderson Mesa	LONEOS	V	1.9 km	MPC · JPL
56544	2000 HB_{65}	—	April 26, 2000	Anderson Mesa	LONEOS	V	1.6 km	MPC · JPL
56545	2000 HK_{65}	—	April 26, 2000	Kitt Peak	Spacewatch	NYS	2.3 km	MPC · JPL
56546	2000 HF_{66}	—	April 26, 2000	Anderson Mesa	LONEOS	·	1.6 km	MPC · JPL
56547	2000 HQ_{69}	—	April 26, 2000	Anderson Mesa	LONEOS	·	1.9 km	MPC · JPL
56548	2000 HZ_{74}	—	April 27, 2000	Socorro	LINEAR	·	4.1 km	MPC · JPL
56549	2000 HZ_{75}	—	April 27, 2000	Socorro	LINEAR	·	1.5 km	MPC · JPL
56550	2000 HZ_{77}	—	April 28, 2000	Socorro	LINEAR	·	2.4 km	MPC · JPL
56551	2000 HJ_{78}	—	April 28, 2000	Socorro	LINEAR	·	1.4 km	MPC · JPL
56552	2000 HL_{78}	—	April 28, 2000	Socorro	LINEAR	V	1.8 km	MPC · JPL
56553	2000 HL_{79}	—	April 28, 2000	Socorro	LINEAR	·	1.6 km	MPC · JPL
56554	2000 HF_{85}	—	April 29, 2000	Kitt Peak	Spacewatch	·	2.0 km	MPC · JPL
56555	2000 HL_{85}	—	April 30, 2000	Anderson Mesa	LONEOS	·	2.2 km	MPC · JPL
56556	2000 HF_{88}	—	April 27, 2000	Socorro	LINEAR	·	2.6 km	MPC · JPL
56557	2000 HX_{91}	—	April 30, 2000	Haleakala	NEAT	V	1.9 km	MPC · JPL
56558	2000 HK_{100}	—	April 24, 2000	Anderson Mesa	LONEOS	KOR	3.2 km	MPC · JPL
56559	2000 JN_{3}	—	May 4, 2000	Socorro	LINEAR	·	2.0 km	MPC · JPL
56560	2000 JW_{6}	—	May 4, 2000	Socorro	LINEAR	·	2.4 km	MPC · JPL
56561 Jaimenomen	2000 JG_{7}	Jaimenomen	May 5, 2000	Starkenburg Observatory	Starkenburg	V	2.3 km	MPC · JPL
56562	2000 JN_{7}	—	May 1, 2000	Kitt Peak	Spacewatch	·	4.5 km	MPC · JPL
56563	2000 JS_{8}	—	May 6, 2000	Reedy Creek	J. Broughton	·	2.6 km	MPC · JPL
56564	2000 JY_{10}	—	May 3, 2000	Socorro	LINEAR	·	2.2 km	MPC · JPL
56565	2000 JY_{12}	—	May 9, 2000	Socorro	LINEAR	·	4.5 km	MPC · JPL
56566	2000 JE_{14}	—	May 6, 2000	Socorro	LINEAR	fast	3.0 km	MPC · JPL
56567	2000 JQ_{14}	—	May 6, 2000	Socorro	LINEAR	·	3.7 km	MPC · JPL
56568	2000 JN_{15}	—	May 9, 2000	Prescott	P. G. Comba	·	1.9 km	MPC · JPL
56569	2000 JL_{17}	—	May 5, 2000	Socorro	LINEAR	·	2.6 km	MPC · JPL
56570	2000 JA_{21}	—	May 6, 2000	Socorro	LINEAR	·	2.4 km	MPC · JPL
56571	2000 JD_{22}	—	May 6, 2000	Socorro	LINEAR	·	2.7 km	MPC · JPL
56572	2000 JZ_{23}	—	May 7, 2000	Socorro	LINEAR	EUN	4.2 km	MPC · JPL
56573	2000 JD_{24}	—	May 7, 2000	Socorro	LINEAR	·	2.4 km	MPC · JPL
56574	2000 JK_{24}	—	May 7, 2000	Socorro	LINEAR	·	5.7 km	MPC · JPL
56575	2000 JX_{24}	—	May 7, 2000	Socorro	LINEAR	·	1.7 km	MPC · JPL
56576	2000 JB_{25}	—	May 7, 2000	Socorro	LINEAR	·	3.4 km	MPC · JPL
56577	2000 JE_{26}	—	May 7, 2000	Socorro	LINEAR	V	1.6 km	MPC · JPL
56578	2000 JJ_{26}	—	May 7, 2000	Socorro	LINEAR	·	2.7 km	MPC · JPL
56579	2000 JB_{27}	—	May 7, 2000	Socorro	LINEAR	·	2.5 km	MPC · JPL
56580	2000 JG_{27}	—	May 7, 2000	Socorro	LINEAR	V	2.3 km	MPC · JPL
56581	2000 JT_{27}	—	May 7, 2000	Socorro	LINEAR	·	1.5 km	MPC · JPL
56582	2000 JW_{27}	—	May 7, 2000	Socorro	LINEAR	·	1.7 km	MPC · JPL
56583	2000 JH_{28}	—	May 7, 2000	Socorro	LINEAR	·	3.1 km	MPC · JPL
56584	2000 JQ_{29}	—	May 7, 2000	Socorro	LINEAR	V	1.5 km	MPC · JPL
56585	2000 JZ_{29}	—	May 7, 2000	Socorro	LINEAR	·	2.9 km	MPC · JPL
56586	2000 JK_{31}	—	May 7, 2000	Socorro	LINEAR	NYS	3.8 km	MPC · JPL
56587	2000 JL_{31}	—	May 7, 2000	Socorro	LINEAR	·	3.3 km	MPC · JPL
56588	2000 JS_{32}	—	May 7, 2000	Socorro	LINEAR	(2076)	1.9 km	MPC · JPL
56589	2000 JH_{33}	—	May 7, 2000	Socorro	LINEAR	·	4.9 km	MPC · JPL
56590	2000 JY_{35}	—	May 7, 2000	Socorro	LINEAR	·	2.1 km	MPC · JPL
56591	2000 JP_{37}	—	May 7, 2000	Socorro	LINEAR	·	3.7 km	MPC · JPL
56592	2000 JF_{38}	—	May 7, 2000	Socorro	LINEAR	·	7.8 km	MPC · JPL
56593	2000 JS_{38}	—	May 7, 2000	Socorro	LINEAR	BRA	4.5 km	MPC · JPL
56594	2000 JL_{40}	—	May 11, 2000	Reedy Creek	J. Broughton	·	2.6 km	MPC · JPL
56595	2000 JX_{40}	—	May 6, 2000	Socorro	LINEAR	MAS	2.1 km	MPC · JPL
56596	2000 JG_{43}	—	May 7, 2000	Socorro	LINEAR	·	1.8 km	MPC · JPL
56597	2000 JO_{44}	—	May 7, 2000	Socorro	LINEAR	·	2.4 km	MPC · JPL
56598	2000 JY_{46}	—	May 9, 2000	Socorro	LINEAR	·	2.9 km	MPC · JPL
56599	2000 JW_{48}	—	May 9, 2000	Socorro	LINEAR	V	1.9 km	MPC · JPL
56600	2000 JK_{50}	—	May 9, 2000	Socorro	LINEAR	·	5.5 km	MPC · JPL

== 56601–56700 ==
back to top

Designation			Discovery			Properties		Ref
Permanent	Provisional	Named after	Date	Site	Discoverer(s)	Category	Diam.	Ref
56601	2000 JS_{50}	—	May 9, 2000	Socorro	LINEAR	NYS	3.3 km	MPC · JPL
56602	2000 JQ_{51}	—	May 9, 2000	Socorro	LINEAR	·	1.9 km	MPC · JPL
56603	2000 JZ_{52}	—	May 9, 2000	Socorro	LINEAR	V	2.1 km	MPC · JPL
56604	2000 JN_{56}	—	May 6, 2000	Socorro	LINEAR	V	2.0 km	MPC · JPL
56605	2000 JG_{57}	—	May 6, 2000	Socorro	LINEAR	(5)	4.0 km	MPC · JPL
56606	2000 JF_{58}	—	May 6, 2000	Socorro	LINEAR	·	3.2 km	MPC · JPL
56607	2000 JL_{58}	—	May 6, 2000	Socorro	LINEAR	·	2.6 km	MPC · JPL
56608	2000 JS_{58}	—	May 6, 2000	Socorro	LINEAR	·	5.2 km	MPC · JPL
56609	2000 JA_{60}	—	May 7, 2000	Socorro	LINEAR	V	2.0 km	MPC · JPL
56610	2000 JZ_{60}	—	May 7, 2000	Socorro	LINEAR	·	4.5 km	MPC · JPL
56611	2000 JH_{61}	—	May 7, 2000	Socorro	LINEAR	(2076)	3.2 km	MPC · JPL
56612	2000 JY_{61}	—	May 7, 2000	Socorro	LINEAR	·	3.2 km	MPC · JPL
56613	2000 JX_{62}	—	May 9, 2000	Socorro	LINEAR	·	5.1 km	MPC · JPL
56614	2000 JQ_{63}	—	May 9, 2000	Socorro	LINEAR	·	3.2 km	MPC · JPL
56615	2000 JL_{69}	—	May 1, 2000	Anderson Mesa	LONEOS	HNS	2.7 km	MPC · JPL
56616	2000 JM_{70}	—	May 1, 2000	Anderson Mesa	LONEOS	·	4.1 km	MPC · JPL
56617	2000 JZ_{72}	—	May 2, 2000	Anderson Mesa	LONEOS	·	2.0 km	MPC · JPL
56618	2000 JC_{73}	—	May 2, 2000	Anderson Mesa	LONEOS	MAR	2.8 km	MPC · JPL
56619	2000 JE_{73}	—	May 2, 2000	Anderson Mesa	LONEOS	·	1.7 km	MPC · JPL
56620	2000 JL_{73}	—	May 2, 2000	Haleakala	NEAT	·	2.1 km	MPC · JPL
56621	2000 JB_{74}	—	May 3, 2000	Kitt Peak	Spacewatch	·	1.5 km	MPC · JPL
56622	2000 JR_{75}	—	May 5, 2000	Socorro	LINEAR	·	3.2 km	MPC · JPL
56623	2000 JC_{76}	—	May 6, 2000	Socorro	LINEAR	·	1.3 km	MPC · JPL
56624	2000 JQ_{76}	—	May 7, 2000	Socorro	LINEAR	·	1.4 km	MPC · JPL
56625	2000 JW_{77}	—	May 9, 2000	Socorro	LINEAR	·	2.4 km	MPC · JPL
56626	2000 JH_{78}	—	May 9, 2000	Socorro	LINEAR	·	5.7 km	MPC · JPL
56627	2000 JF_{84}	—	May 5, 2000	Socorro	LINEAR	·	3.1 km	MPC · JPL
56628	2000 JG_{84}	—	May 5, 2000	Socorro	LINEAR	·	1.5 km	MPC · JPL
56629	2000 KV	—	May 25, 2000	Prescott	P. G. Comba	·	2.6 km	MPC · JPL
56630	2000 KP_{2}	—	May 26, 2000	Socorro	LINEAR	·	11 km	MPC · JPL
56631	2000 KV_{2}	—	May 26, 2000	Socorro	LINEAR	·	9.4 km	MPC · JPL
56632	2000 KE_{7}	—	May 27, 2000	Socorro	LINEAR	NYS ·	3.5 km	MPC · JPL
56633	2000 KY_{8}	—	May 28, 2000	Socorro	LINEAR	·	1.9 km	MPC · JPL
56634	2000 KZ_{11}	—	May 28, 2000	Socorro	LINEAR	·	3.6 km	MPC · JPL
56635	2000 KR_{12}	—	May 28, 2000	Socorro	LINEAR	MAS	2.2 km	MPC · JPL
56636	2000 KA_{14}	—	May 28, 2000	Socorro	LINEAR	EUN	2.6 km	MPC · JPL
56637	2000 KG_{14}	—	May 28, 2000	Socorro	LINEAR	(16286)	4.3 km	MPC · JPL
56638	2000 KN_{15}	—	May 28, 2000	Socorro	LINEAR	NYS	3.0 km	MPC · JPL
56639	2000 KE_{19}	—	May 28, 2000	Socorro	LINEAR	·	1.9 km	MPC · JPL
56640	2000 KZ_{19}	—	May 28, 2000	Socorro	LINEAR	·	2.4 km	MPC · JPL
56641	2000 KN_{27}	—	May 28, 2000	Socorro	LINEAR	·	2.4 km	MPC · JPL
56642	2000 KU_{29}	—	May 28, 2000	Socorro	LINEAR	V	1.8 km	MPC · JPL
56643	2000 KY_{29}	—	May 28, 2000	Socorro	LINEAR	·	1.9 km	MPC · JPL
56644	2000 KL_{30}	—	May 28, 2000	Socorro	LINEAR	V	2.6 km	MPC · JPL
56645	2000 KV_{32}	—	May 28, 2000	Socorro	LINEAR	·	3.0 km	MPC · JPL
56646	2000 KW_{32}	—	May 28, 2000	Socorro	LINEAR	V	2.0 km	MPC · JPL
56647	2000 KG_{34}	—	May 27, 2000	Socorro	LINEAR	·	3.2 km	MPC · JPL
56648	2000 KH_{34}	—	May 27, 2000	Socorro	LINEAR	·	3.6 km	MPC · JPL
56649	2000 KD_{42}	—	May 27, 2000	Socorro	LINEAR	·	2.5 km	MPC · JPL
56650	2000 KE_{42}	—	May 28, 2000	Socorro	LINEAR	PHO	3.6 km	MPC · JPL
56651	2000 KH_{46}	—	May 27, 2000	Socorro	LINEAR	·	1.8 km	MPC · JPL
56652	2000 KJ_{48}	—	May 27, 2000	Socorro	LINEAR	·	2.4 km	MPC · JPL
56653	2000 KS_{48}	—	May 29, 2000	Socorro	LINEAR	·	2.3 km	MPC · JPL
56654	2000 KU_{50}	—	May 28, 2000	Socorro	LINEAR	·	2.5 km	MPC · JPL
56655	2000 KZ_{51}	—	May 23, 2000	Anderson Mesa	LONEOS	·	1.7 km	MPC · JPL
56656	2000 KW_{52}	—	May 25, 2000	Anderson Mesa	LONEOS	·	3.0 km	MPC · JPL
56657	2000 KY_{52}	—	May 25, 2000	Anderson Mesa	LONEOS	·	3.4 km	MPC · JPL
56658	2000 KJ_{55}	—	May 27, 2000	Socorro	LINEAR	·	2.0 km	MPC · JPL
56659	2000 KU_{55}	—	May 27, 2000	Socorro	LINEAR	·	1.4 km	MPC · JPL
56660	2000 KO_{56}	—	May 27, 2000	Socorro	LINEAR	·	2.6 km	MPC · JPL
56661	2000 KQ_{56}	—	May 27, 2000	Socorro	LINEAR	·	7.4 km	MPC · JPL
56662	2000 KY_{56}	—	May 27, 2000	Socorro	LINEAR	·	3.3 km	MPC · JPL
56663	2000 KF_{60}	—	May 25, 2000	Anderson Mesa	LONEOS	V	1.8 km	MPC · JPL
56664	2000 KN_{60}	—	May 25, 2000	Anderson Mesa	LONEOS	V	1.3 km	MPC · JPL
56665	2000 KJ_{62}	—	May 26, 2000	Anderson Mesa	LONEOS	·	4.1 km	MPC · JPL
56666	2000 KQ_{64}	—	May 27, 2000	Socorro	LINEAR	·	1.8 km	MPC · JPL
56667	2000 KF_{67}	—	May 31, 2000	Socorro	LINEAR	PHO	3.1 km	MPC · JPL
56668	2000 KE_{69}	—	May 29, 2000	Kitt Peak	Spacewatch	V	1.5 km	MPC · JPL
56669	2000 KV_{71}	—	May 28, 2000	Socorro	LINEAR	·	6.4 km	MPC · JPL
56670	2000 KW_{74}	—	May 27, 2000	Socorro	LINEAR	·	3.4 km	MPC · JPL
56671	2000 KL_{75}	—	May 27, 2000	Socorro	LINEAR	·	2.8 km	MPC · JPL
56672	2000 KP_{76}	—	May 27, 2000	Socorro	LINEAR	V	1.5 km	MPC · JPL
56673	2000 KT_{76}	—	May 27, 2000	Socorro	LINEAR	·	2.6 km	MPC · JPL
56674	2000 KS_{77}	—	May 27, 2000	Socorro	LINEAR	·	2.8 km	MPC · JPL
56675	2000 KM_{78}	—	May 27, 2000	Socorro	LINEAR	·	2.6 km	MPC · JPL
56676	2000 LC	—	June 1, 2000	Prescott	P. G. Comba	NYS	2.2 km	MPC · JPL
56677	2000 LG_{1}	—	June 1, 2000	Črni Vrh	Matičič, S.	·	4.0 km	MPC · JPL
56678 Alicewessen	2000 LR_{1}	Alicewessen	June 3, 2000	Farpoint	G. Hug	EOS	6.6 km	MPC · JPL
56679	2000 LB_{8}	—	June 6, 2000	Socorro	LINEAR	·	2.5 km	MPC · JPL
56680	2000 LM_{8}	—	June 6, 2000	Socorro	LINEAR	·	4.8 km	MPC · JPL
56681	2000 LY_{8}	—	June 5, 2000	Socorro	LINEAR	·	1.7 km	MPC · JPL
56682	2000 LA_{9}	—	June 5, 2000	Socorro	LINEAR	·	3.2 km	MPC · JPL
56683	2000 LC_{9}	—	June 5, 2000	Socorro	LINEAR	NYS	3.3 km	MPC · JPL
56684	2000 LV_{10}	—	June 4, 2000	Socorro	LINEAR	ADE	5.0 km	MPC · JPL
56685	2000 LE_{11}	—	June 4, 2000	Socorro	LINEAR	·	4.1 km	MPC · JPL
56686	2000 LB_{12}	—	June 4, 2000	Socorro	LINEAR	MAR	3.6 km	MPC · JPL
56687	2000 LE_{12}	—	June 4, 2000	Socorro	LINEAR	·	5.0 km	MPC · JPL
56688	2000 LM_{12}	—	June 5, 2000	Socorro	LINEAR	·	5.1 km	MPC · JPL
56689	2000 LD_{14}	—	June 6, 2000	Socorro	LINEAR	·	6.1 km	MPC · JPL
56690	2000 LZ_{14}	—	June 5, 2000	Črni Vrh	Mikuž, H.	·	2.2 km	MPC · JPL
56691	2000 LW_{16}	—	June 4, 2000	Socorro	LINEAR	·	3.4 km	MPC · JPL
56692	2000 LK_{20}	—	June 8, 2000	Socorro	LINEAR	·	5.8 km	MPC · JPL
56693	2000 LY_{20}	—	June 8, 2000	Socorro	LINEAR	·	4.2 km	MPC · JPL
56694	2000 LC_{24}	—	June 1, 2000	Socorro	LINEAR	·	5.2 km	MPC · JPL
56695	2000 LG_{26}	—	June 1, 2000	Socorro	LINEAR	·	6.5 km	MPC · JPL
56696	2000 LQ_{26}	—	June 1, 2000	Anderson Mesa	LONEOS	V	4.4 km	MPC · JPL
56697	2000 LO_{27}	—	June 6, 2000	Anderson Mesa	LONEOS	·	3.6 km	MPC · JPL
56698	2000 LR_{27}	—	June 6, 2000	Anderson Mesa	LONEOS	·	3.4 km	MPC · JPL
56699	2000 LJ_{28}	—	June 6, 2000	Anderson Mesa	LONEOS	·	4.4 km	MPC · JPL
56700	2000 LL_{28}	—	June 6, 2000	Anderson Mesa	LONEOS	·	7.5 km	MPC · JPL

== 56701–56800 ==
back to top

Designation			Discovery			Properties		Ref
Permanent	Provisional	Named after	Date	Site	Discoverer(s)	Category	Diam.	Ref
56701	2000 LM_{28}	—	June 9, 2000	Anderson Mesa	LONEOS	·	5.5 km	MPC · JPL
56702	2000 LQ_{28}	—	June 9, 2000	Anderson Mesa	LONEOS	·	12 km	MPC · JPL
56703	2000 LT_{30}	—	June 10, 2000	Socorro	LINEAR	·	7.5 km	MPC · JPL
56704	2000 LC_{31}	—	June 6, 2000	Anderson Mesa	LONEOS	·	3.8 km	MPC · JPL
56705	2000 LL_{33}	—	June 4, 2000	Kitt Peak	Spacewatch	EUN	3.3 km	MPC · JPL
56706	2000 LD_{36}	—	June 1, 2000	Haleakala	NEAT	·	2.4 km	MPC · JPL
56707	2000 LY_{36}	—	June 11, 2000	Socorro	LINEAR	·	4.5 km	MPC · JPL
56708	2000 MZ	—	June 24, 2000	Reedy Creek	J. Broughton	·	2.6 km	MPC · JPL
56709	2000 MY_{1}	—	June 27, 2000	Reedy Creek	J. Broughton	·	6.4 km	MPC · JPL
56710	2000 MN_{2}	—	June 24, 2000	Haleakala	NEAT	·	3.0 km	MPC · JPL
56711	2000 MO_{2}	—	June 24, 2000	Haleakala	NEAT	EUN	4.5 km	MPC · JPL
56712	2000 MQ_{2}	—	June 25, 2000	Haleakala	NEAT	NYS	2.5 km	MPC · JPL
56713	2000 MC_{3}	—	June 30, 2000	Ondřejov	P. Kušnirák	·	3.0 km	MPC · JPL
56714	2000 MK_{3}	—	June 25, 2000	Kitt Peak	Spacewatch	·	6.5 km	MPC · JPL
56715	2000 MT_{3}	—	June 24, 2000	Socorro	LINEAR	·	2.2 km	MPC · JPL
56716	2000 MZ_{3}	—	June 24, 2000	Socorro	LINEAR	·	3.2 km	MPC · JPL
56717	2000 MS_{4}	—	June 25, 2000	Socorro	LINEAR	EUN	3.3 km	MPC · JPL
56718	2000 MU_{4}	—	June 25, 2000	Socorro	LINEAR	·	3.1 km	MPC · JPL
56719	2000 MA_{6}	—	June 24, 2000	Socorro	LINEAR	·	2.1 km	MPC · JPL
56720	2000 NK_{9}	—	July 7, 2000	Socorro	LINEAR	·	5.9 km	MPC · JPL
56721	2000 NY_{11}	—	July 4, 2000	Anderson Mesa	LONEOS	·	3.1 km	MPC · JPL
56722	2000 NH_{12}	—	July 5, 2000	Anderson Mesa	LONEOS	·	4.2 km	MPC · JPL
56723	2000 NK_{12}	—	July 5, 2000	Anderson Mesa	LONEOS	·	3.4 km	MPC · JPL
56724	2000 NQ_{12}	—	July 5, 2000	Anderson Mesa	LONEOS	·	3.3 km	MPC · JPL
56725	2000 NY_{12}	—	July 5, 2000	Anderson Mesa	LONEOS	·	3.6 km	MPC · JPL
56726	2000 NA_{13}	—	July 5, 2000	Anderson Mesa	LONEOS	EOS	5.4 km	MPC · JPL
56727	2000 NU_{13}	—	July 5, 2000	Anderson Mesa	LONEOS	·	9.4 km	MPC · JPL
56728	2000 NZ_{13}	—	July 5, 2000	Anderson Mesa	LONEOS	EOS	5.3 km	MPC · JPL
56729	2000 NM_{14}	—	July 5, 2000	Anderson Mesa	LONEOS	·	4.7 km	MPC · JPL
56730	2000 NK_{15}	—	July 5, 2000	Anderson Mesa	LONEOS	NAE	9.8 km	MPC · JPL
56731	2000 NP_{16}	—	July 5, 2000	Anderson Mesa	LONEOS	·	3.8 km	MPC · JPL
56732	2000 NQ_{16}	—	July 5, 2000	Anderson Mesa	LONEOS	·	4.5 km	MPC · JPL
56733	2000 NK_{17}	—	July 5, 2000	Anderson Mesa	LONEOS	·	5.6 km	MPC · JPL
56734	2000 NM_{17}	—	July 5, 2000	Anderson Mesa	LONEOS	·	13 km	MPC · JPL
56735	2000 NB_{18}	—	July 5, 2000	Anderson Mesa	LONEOS	·	3.2 km	MPC · JPL
56736	2000 NX_{19}	—	July 5, 2000	Anderson Mesa	LONEOS	·	2.6 km	MPC · JPL
56737	2000 NS_{20}	—	July 6, 2000	Anderson Mesa	LONEOS	·	4.7 km	MPC · JPL
56738	2000 NV_{20}	—	July 6, 2000	Anderson Mesa	LONEOS	·	4.2 km	MPC · JPL
56739	2000 NG_{21}	—	July 7, 2000	Anderson Mesa	LONEOS	EUN	4.9 km	MPC · JPL
56740	2000 NC_{23}	—	July 5, 2000	Anderson Mesa	LONEOS	·	8.5 km	MPC · JPL
56741	2000 ND_{24}	—	July 5, 2000	Kitt Peak	Spacewatch	·	4.5 km	MPC · JPL
56742	2000 NB_{25}	—	July 4, 2000	Anderson Mesa	LONEOS	EOS	6.2 km	MPC · JPL
56743	2000 ND_{26}	—	July 4, 2000	Anderson Mesa	LONEOS	·	4.8 km	MPC · JPL
56744	2000 NN_{26}	—	July 4, 2000	Anderson Mesa	LONEOS	EOS	5.6 km	MPC · JPL
56745	2000 NU_{26}	—	July 4, 2000	Anderson Mesa	LONEOS	EOS	5.5 km	MPC · JPL
56746	2000 OO_{2}	—	July 27, 2000	Črni Vrh	Mikuž, H.	·	4.5 km	MPC · JPL
56747	2000 OD_{4}	—	July 24, 2000	Socorro	LINEAR	EOS	6.2 km	MPC · JPL
56748	2000 OF_{4}	—	July 24, 2000	Socorro	LINEAR	BRG	3.9 km	MPC · JPL
56749	2000 OJ_{4}	—	July 24, 2000	Socorro	LINEAR	EOS	5.6 km	MPC · JPL
56750	2000 OT_{4}	—	July 24, 2000	Socorro	LINEAR	·	4.6 km	MPC · JPL
56751	2000 OU_{4}	—	July 24, 2000	Socorro	LINEAR	·	7.5 km	MPC · JPL
56752	2000 OA_{5}	—	July 24, 2000	Socorro	LINEAR	·	12 km	MPC · JPL
56753	2000 OG_{6}	—	July 29, 2000	Socorro	LINEAR	·	3.9 km	MPC · JPL
56754	2000 OP_{10}	—	July 23, 2000	Socorro	LINEAR	·	2.4 km	MPC · JPL
56755	2000 OT_{12}	—	July 23, 2000	Socorro	LINEAR	NYS	2.8 km	MPC · JPL
56756	2000 OW_{14}	—	July 23, 2000	Socorro	LINEAR	·	6.7 km	MPC · JPL
56757	2000 OQ_{17}	—	July 23, 2000	Socorro	LINEAR	·	3.8 km	MPC · JPL
56758	2000 OU_{17}	—	July 23, 2000	Socorro	LINEAR	EUN	2.8 km	MPC · JPL
56759	2000 OU_{18}	—	July 23, 2000	Socorro	LINEAR	MIS	7.0 km	MPC · JPL
56760	2000 OY_{18}	—	July 23, 2000	Socorro	LINEAR	·	5.2 km	MPC · JPL
56761	2000 OH_{19}	—	July 29, 2000	Socorro	LINEAR	·	3.7 km	MPC · JPL
56762	2000 OB_{23}	—	July 23, 2000	Socorro	LINEAR	(5)	3.1 km	MPC · JPL
56763	2000 OC_{23}	—	July 23, 2000	Socorro	LINEAR	·	4.2 km	MPC · JPL
56764	2000 ON_{24}	—	July 23, 2000	Socorro	LINEAR	·	11 km	MPC · JPL
56765	2000 OD_{25}	—	July 23, 2000	Socorro	LINEAR	·	4.6 km	MPC · JPL
56766	2000 OK_{25}	—	July 23, 2000	Socorro	LINEAR	·	6.5 km	MPC · JPL
56767	2000 OP_{26}	—	July 23, 2000	Socorro	LINEAR	(5)	6.1 km	MPC · JPL
56768	2000 OS_{27}	—	July 23, 2000	Socorro	LINEAR	·	16 km	MPC · JPL
56769	2000 OE_{28}	—	July 24, 2000	Socorro	LINEAR	EUN	4.3 km	MPC · JPL
56770	2000 OA_{30}	—	July 30, 2000	Socorro	LINEAR	·	3.0 km	MPC · JPL
56771	2000 OS_{30}	—	July 30, 2000	Socorro	LINEAR	·	6.0 km	MPC · JPL
56772	2000 OW_{30}	—	July 30, 2000	Socorro	LINEAR	·	7.7 km	MPC · JPL
56773	2000 OO_{35}	—	July 31, 2000	Socorro	LINEAR	EOS	5.9 km	MPC · JPL
56774	2000 OH_{37}	—	July 30, 2000	Socorro	LINEAR	EOS	6.2 km	MPC · JPL
56775	2000 OU_{37}	—	July 30, 2000	Socorro	LINEAR	EUN	3.6 km	MPC · JPL
56776	2000 OQ_{38}	—	July 30, 2000	Socorro	LINEAR	EUN	3.6 km	MPC · JPL
56777	2000 OC_{39}	—	July 30, 2000	Socorro	LINEAR	·	6.5 km	MPC · JPL
56778	2000 OM_{39}	—	July 30, 2000	Socorro	LINEAR	·	3.7 km	MPC · JPL
56779	2000 OH_{41}	—	July 30, 2000	Socorro	LINEAR	EUN	2.9 km	MPC · JPL
56780	2000 OJ_{43}	—	July 30, 2000	Socorro	LINEAR	slow	4.5 km	MPC · JPL
56781	2000 OT_{43}	—	July 30, 2000	Socorro	LINEAR	·	5.9 km	MPC · JPL
56782	2000 OC_{46}	—	July 30, 2000	Socorro	LINEAR	·	3.3 km	MPC · JPL
56783	2000 OG_{51}	—	July 30, 2000	Socorro	LINEAR	·	5.5 km	MPC · JPL
56784	2000 OH_{53}	—	July 30, 2000	Socorro	LINEAR	EOS	8.0 km	MPC · JPL
56785	2000 OS_{53}	—	July 30, 2000	Socorro	LINEAR	·	8.2 km	MPC · JPL
56786	2000 OX_{53}	—	July 29, 2000	Anderson Mesa	LONEOS	·	2.7 km	MPC · JPL
56787	2000 OZ_{53}	—	July 29, 2000	Anderson Mesa	LONEOS	EOS	4.0 km	MPC · JPL
56788 Guilbertlepoutre	2000 OA_{54}	Guilbertlepoutre	July 29, 2000	Anderson Mesa	LONEOS	·	11 km	MPC · JPL
56789	2000 OU_{54}	—	July 29, 2000	Anderson Mesa	LONEOS	·	6.4 km	MPC · JPL
56790	2000 OZ_{55}	—	July 29, 2000	Anderson Mesa	LONEOS	PAD	4.6 km	MPC · JPL
56791	2000 OH_{56}	—	July 29, 2000	Anderson Mesa	LONEOS	·	3.4 km	MPC · JPL
56792	2000 OP_{56}	—	July 29, 2000	Anderson Mesa	LONEOS	·	3.0 km	MPC · JPL
56793	2000 OB_{60}	—	July 29, 2000	Anderson Mesa	LONEOS	·	4.2 km	MPC · JPL
56794	2000 OO_{60}	—	July 29, 2000	Anderson Mesa	LONEOS	(1298)	7.9 km	MPC · JPL
56795 Amandagorman	2000 OE_{67}	Amandagorman	July 31, 2000	Cerro Tololo	M. W. Buie	·	2.6 km	MPC · JPL
56796	2000 PT	—	August 1, 2000	Socorro	LINEAR	·	3.8 km	MPC · JPL
56797	2000 PC_{2}	—	August 1, 2000	Socorro	LINEAR	·	3.6 km	MPC · JPL
56798	2000 PW_{3}	—	August 3, 2000	Bisei SG Center	BATTeRS	·	3.0 km	MPC · JPL
56799	2000 PN_{4}	—	August 2, 2000	Socorro	LINEAR	·	3.7 km	MPC · JPL
56800	2000 PO_{4}	—	August 3, 2000	Socorro	LINEAR	MAR	3.1 km	MPC · JPL

== 56801–56900 ==
back to top

Designation			Discovery			Properties		Ref
Permanent	Provisional	Named after	Date	Site	Discoverer(s)	Category	Diam.	Ref
56801	2000 PF_{9}	—	August 6, 2000	Siding Spring	R. H. McNaught	·	8.0 km	MPC · JPL
56802	2000 PZ_{9}	—	August 1, 2000	Socorro	LINEAR	·	5.4 km	MPC · JPL
56803	2000 PA_{11}	—	August 1, 2000	Socorro	LINEAR	PHO	3.6 km	MPC · JPL
56804	2000 PP_{12}	—	August 3, 2000	Socorro	LINEAR	EOS	4.9 km	MPC · JPL
56805	2000 PR_{12}	—	August 3, 2000	Socorro	LINEAR	slow	5.3 km	MPC · JPL
56806	2000 PM_{14}	—	August 1, 2000	Socorro	LINEAR	·	2.9 km	MPC · JPL
56807	2000 PR_{14}	—	August 1, 2000	Socorro	LINEAR	·	2.6 km	MPC · JPL
56808	2000 PO_{15}	—	August 1, 2000	Socorro	LINEAR	KOR	3.0 km	MPC · JPL
56809	2000 PE_{16}	—	August 1, 2000	Socorro	LINEAR	·	8.2 km	MPC · JPL
56810	2000 PU_{16}	—	August 1, 2000	Socorro	LINEAR	·	3.1 km	MPC · JPL
56811	2000 PG_{19}	—	August 1, 2000	Socorro	LINEAR	EOS	6.0 km	MPC · JPL
56812	2000 PM_{21}	—	August 1, 2000	Socorro	LINEAR	·	4.3 km	MPC · JPL
56813	2000 PN_{22}	—	August 1, 2000	Socorro	LINEAR	EUN	3.5 km	MPC · JPL
56814	2000 PD_{29}	—	August 1, 2000	Socorro	LINEAR	·	4.6 km	MPC · JPL
56815	2000 PS_{29}	—	August 1, 2000	Socorro	LINEAR	·	10 km	MPC · JPL
56816	2000 QQ	—	August 21, 2000	Reedy Creek	J. Broughton	·	4.2 km	MPC · JPL
56817	2000 QF_{1}	—	August 23, 2000	Reedy Creek	J. Broughton	·	3.1 km	MPC · JPL
56818	2000 QV_{3}	—	August 24, 2000	Socorro	LINEAR	EOS	5.3 km	MPC · JPL
56819	2000 QQ_{5}	—	August 24, 2000	Socorro	LINEAR	EOS	4.5 km	MPC · JPL
56820	2000 QK_{8}	—	August 26, 2000	Višnjan Observatory	K. Korlević, M. Jurić	EOS	11 km	MPC · JPL
56821	2000 QC_{11}	—	August 24, 2000	Socorro	LINEAR	MAS	1.7 km	MPC · JPL
56822	2000 QR_{12}	—	August 24, 2000	Socorro	LINEAR	·	3.4 km	MPC · JPL
56823	2000 QZ_{12}	—	August 24, 2000	Socorro	LINEAR	·	5.0 km	MPC · JPL
56824	2000 QA_{13}	—	August 24, 2000	Socorro	LINEAR	KOR	3.5 km	MPC · JPL
56825	2000 QA_{14}	—	August 24, 2000	Socorro	LINEAR	·	2.9 km	MPC · JPL
56826	2000 QA_{25}	—	August 25, 2000	Socorro	LINEAR	·	5.1 km	MPC · JPL
56827	2000 QB_{28}	—	August 24, 2000	Socorro	LINEAR	·	5.6 km	MPC · JPL
56828	2000 QE_{28}	—	August 24, 2000	Socorro	LINEAR	·	6.2 km	MPC · JPL
56829	2000 QL_{28}	—	August 24, 2000	Socorro	LINEAR	KOR	3.5 km	MPC · JPL
56830	2000 QT_{29}	—	August 25, 2000	Socorro	LINEAR	·	5.5 km	MPC · JPL
56831	2000 QZ_{30}	—	August 26, 2000	Socorro	LINEAR	EOS	5.1 km	MPC · JPL
56832	2000 QM_{31}	—	August 26, 2000	Socorro	LINEAR	·	4.8 km	MPC · JPL
56833	2000 QN_{33}	—	August 26, 2000	Socorro	LINEAR	·	7.4 km	MPC · JPL
56834	2000 QO_{35}	—	August 28, 2000	Višnjan Observatory	K. Korlević	GEF	3.8 km	MPC · JPL
56835	2000 QM_{36}	—	August 24, 2000	Socorro	LINEAR	·	4.3 km	MPC · JPL
56836	2000 QK_{39}	—	August 24, 2000	Socorro	LINEAR	·	3.7 km	MPC · JPL
56837	2000 QX_{39}	—	August 24, 2000	Socorro	LINEAR	·	5.4 km	MPC · JPL
56838	2000 QK_{40}	—	August 24, 2000	Socorro	LINEAR	HOF	8.7 km	MPC · JPL
56839	2000 QM_{40}	—	August 24, 2000	Socorro	LINEAR	·	4.3 km	MPC · JPL
56840	2000 QW_{41}	—	August 24, 2000	Socorro	LINEAR	·	6.4 km	MPC · JPL
56841	2000 QS_{42}	—	August 24, 2000	Socorro	LINEAR	EOS	6.0 km	MPC · JPL
56842	2000 QJ_{44}	—	August 24, 2000	Socorro	LINEAR	·	2.2 km	MPC · JPL
56843	2000 QK_{45}	—	August 24, 2000	Socorro	LINEAR	·	4.3 km	MPC · JPL
56844	2000 QP_{45}	—	August 24, 2000	Socorro	LINEAR	·	2.5 km	MPC · JPL
56845	2000 QL_{50}	—	August 24, 2000	Socorro	LINEAR	·	2.8 km	MPC · JPL
56846	2000 QF_{53}	—	August 24, 2000	Socorro	LINEAR	·	3.7 km	MPC · JPL
56847	2000 QB_{59}	—	August 26, 2000	Socorro	LINEAR	·	4.4 km	MPC · JPL
56848	2000 QC_{59}	—	August 26, 2000	Socorro	LINEAR	·	3.4 km	MPC · JPL
56849	2000 QH_{61}	—	August 28, 2000	Socorro	LINEAR	·	3.3 km	MPC · JPL
56850	2000 QT_{61}	—	August 28, 2000	Socorro	LINEAR	·	6.7 km	MPC · JPL
56851	2000 QU_{64}	—	August 28, 2000	Socorro	LINEAR	·	4.6 km	MPC · JPL
56852	2000 QP_{65}	—	August 28, 2000	Socorro	LINEAR	·	3.8 km	MPC · JPL
56853	2000 QQ_{67}	—	August 28, 2000	Socorro	LINEAR	·	7.8 km	MPC · JPL
56854	2000 QL_{71}	—	August 24, 2000	Socorro	LINEAR	·	5.0 km	MPC · JPL
56855	2000 QJ_{73}	—	August 24, 2000	Socorro	LINEAR	·	5.5 km	MPC · JPL
56856	2000 QM_{73}	—	August 24, 2000	Socorro	LINEAR	·	4.8 km	MPC · JPL
56857	2000 QS_{75}	—	August 24, 2000	Socorro	LINEAR	·	8.0 km	MPC · JPL
56858	2000 QZ_{77}	—	August 24, 2000	Socorro	LINEAR	·	2.8 km	MPC · JPL
56859	2000 QA_{82}	—	August 24, 2000	Socorro	LINEAR	·	6.8 km	MPC · JPL
56860	2000 QP_{85}	—	August 25, 2000	Socorro	LINEAR	·	5.3 km	MPC · JPL
56861	2000 QW_{86}	—	August 25, 2000	Socorro	LINEAR	·	5.9 km	MPC · JPL
56862	2000 QS_{90}	—	August 25, 2000	Socorro	LINEAR	·	9.4 km	MPC · JPL
56863	2000 QZ_{90}	—	August 25, 2000	Socorro	LINEAR	·	4.1 km	MPC · JPL
56864	2000 QG_{91}	—	August 25, 2000	Socorro	LINEAR	EUP	10 km	MPC · JPL
56865	2000 QY_{91}	—	August 25, 2000	Socorro	LINEAR	·	7.6 km	MPC · JPL
56866	2000 QN_{94}	—	August 26, 2000	Socorro	LINEAR	URS	10 km	MPC · JPL
56867	2000 QL_{97}	—	August 28, 2000	Socorro	LINEAR	·	3.7 km	MPC · JPL
56868	2000 QT_{101}	—	August 28, 2000	Socorro	LINEAR	·	9.4 km	MPC · JPL
56869	2000 QS_{102}	—	August 28, 2000	Socorro	LINEAR	·	4.4 km	MPC · JPL
56870	2000 QL_{104}	—	August 28, 2000	Socorro	LINEAR	·	4.1 km	MPC · JPL
56871	2000 QB_{108}	—	August 29, 2000	Socorro	LINEAR	HYG	6.9 km	MPC · JPL
56872	2000 QD_{109}	—	August 29, 2000	Socorro	LINEAR	·	6.0 km	MPC · JPL
56873	2000 QG_{110}	—	August 24, 2000	Socorro	LINEAR	·	4.4 km	MPC · JPL
56874	2000 QX_{110}	—	August 24, 2000	Socorro	LINEAR	EUP	8.8 km	MPC · JPL
56875	2000 QE_{111}	—	August 24, 2000	Socorro	LINEAR	·	5.5 km	MPC · JPL
56876	2000 QN_{111}	—	August 24, 2000	Socorro	LINEAR	·	3.4 km	MPC · JPL
56877	2000 QA_{113}	—	August 24, 2000	Socorro	LINEAR	EOS	4.5 km	MPC · JPL
56878	2000 QT_{115}	—	August 25, 2000	Socorro	LINEAR	·	5.0 km	MPC · JPL
56879	2000 QW_{118}	—	August 25, 2000	Socorro	LINEAR	EMA	9.4 km	MPC · JPL
56880	2000 QS_{120}	—	August 25, 2000	Socorro	LINEAR	EOS	5.5 km	MPC · JPL
56881	2000 QE_{122}	—	August 25, 2000	Socorro	LINEAR	CYB	11 km	MPC · JPL
56882	2000 QT_{122}	—	August 25, 2000	Socorro	LINEAR	·	6.4 km	MPC · JPL
56883	2000 QH_{125}	—	August 31, 2000	Socorro	LINEAR	·	6.5 km	MPC · JPL
56884	2000 QK_{125}	—	August 31, 2000	Socorro	LINEAR	·	8.1 km	MPC · JPL
56885	2000 QP_{127}	—	August 24, 2000	Socorro	LINEAR	·	10 km	MPC · JPL
56886	2000 QG_{131}	—	August 24, 2000	Socorro	LINEAR	AGN	2.7 km	MPC · JPL
56887	2000 QZ_{131}	—	August 26, 2000	Socorro	LINEAR	·	3.1 km	MPC · JPL
56888	2000 QG_{134}	—	August 26, 2000	Socorro	LINEAR	·	6.6 km	MPC · JPL
56889	2000 QC_{137}	—	August 29, 2000	Socorro	LINEAR	HYG	9.0 km	MPC · JPL
56890	2000 QM_{137}	—	August 31, 2000	Socorro	LINEAR	·	4.1 km	MPC · JPL
56891	2000 QH_{139}	—	August 31, 2000	Socorro	LINEAR	EUN	4.4 km	MPC · JPL
56892	2000 QB_{142}	—	August 31, 2000	Socorro	LINEAR	EOS	3.5 km	MPC · JPL
56893	2000 QD_{145}	—	August 31, 2000	Socorro	LINEAR	EUN	2.8 km	MPC · JPL
56894	2000 QP_{145}	—	August 31, 2000	Socorro	LINEAR	·	5.2 km	MPC · JPL
56895	2000 QS_{149}	—	August 25, 2000	Socorro	LINEAR	·	4.4 km	MPC · JPL
56896	2000 QN_{155}	—	August 31, 2000	Socorro	LINEAR	·	4.4 km	MPC · JPL
56897	2000 QC_{158}	—	August 31, 2000	Socorro	LINEAR	EOS	4.7 km	MPC · JPL
56898	2000 QH_{158}	—	August 31, 2000	Socorro	LINEAR	EOS	4.4 km	MPC · JPL
56899	2000 QO_{158}	—	August 31, 2000	Socorro	LINEAR	·	5.1 km	MPC · JPL
56900	2000 QR_{161}	—	August 31, 2000	Socorro	LINEAR	EOS	4.4 km	MPC · JPL

== 56901–57000 ==
back to top

Designation			Discovery			Properties		Ref
Permanent	Provisional	Named after	Date	Site	Discoverer(s)	Category	Diam.	Ref
56901	2000 QR_{162}	—	August 31, 2000	Socorro	LINEAR	EOS	3.8 km	MPC · JPL
56902	2000 QT_{164}	—	August 31, 2000	Socorro	LINEAR	EOS	6.8 km	MPC · JPL
56903	2000 QR_{170}	—	August 31, 2000	Socorro	LINEAR	·	4.5 km	MPC · JPL
56904	2000 QP_{171}	—	August 31, 2000	Socorro	LINEAR	EUN	3.3 km	MPC · JPL
56905	2000 QB_{176}	—	August 31, 2000	Socorro	LINEAR	·	6.3 km	MPC · JPL
56906	2000 QY_{184}	—	August 26, 2000	Socorro	LINEAR	URS	7.5 km	MPC · JPL
56907	2000 QJ_{185}	—	August 26, 2000	Socorro	LINEAR	EOS	6.5 km	MPC · JPL
56908	2000 QX_{185}	—	August 26, 2000	Socorro	LINEAR	·	3.1 km	MPC · JPL
56909	2000 QP_{190}	—	August 26, 2000	Socorro	LINEAR	·	4.5 km	MPC · JPL
56910	2000 QJ_{192}	—	August 26, 2000	Socorro	LINEAR	EOS	6.6 km	MPC · JPL
56911	2000 QY_{192}	—	August 26, 2000	Socorro	LINEAR	·	8.6 km	MPC · JPL
56912	2000 QH_{195}	—	August 26, 2000	Socorro	LINEAR	·	5.0 km	MPC · JPL
56913	2000 QS_{200}	—	August 29, 2000	Socorro	LINEAR	EOS	3.8 km	MPC · JPL
56914	2000 QP_{203}	—	August 29, 2000	Socorro	LINEAR	·	3.0 km	MPC · JPL
56915	2000 QW_{206}	—	August 31, 2000	Socorro	LINEAR	EUN	3.5 km	MPC · JPL
56916	2000 QU_{210}	—	August 31, 2000	Socorro	LINEAR	·	6.5 km	MPC · JPL
56917	2000 QO_{221}	—	August 21, 2000	Anderson Mesa	LONEOS	·	9.2 km	MPC · JPL
56918	2000 QQ_{230}	—	August 31, 2000	Socorro	LINEAR	·	9.0 km	MPC · JPL
56919	2000 QF_{251}	—	August 21, 2000	Anderson Mesa	LONEOS	·	6.2 km	MPC · JPL
56920	2000 RA_{1}	—	September 1, 2000	Socorro	LINEAR	·	10 km	MPC · JPL
56921	2000 RW_{3}	—	September 1, 2000	Socorro	LINEAR	EOS	4.7 km	MPC · JPL
56922	2000 RE_{15}	—	September 1, 2000	Socorro	LINEAR	EOS · slow	5.5 km	MPC · JPL
56923	2000 RB_{19}	—	September 1, 2000	Socorro	LINEAR	·	5.7 km	MPC · JPL
56924	2000 RJ_{20}	—	September 1, 2000	Socorro	LINEAR	·	6.4 km	MPC · JPL
56925	2000 RG_{21}	—	September 1, 2000	Socorro	LINEAR	EUN	3.5 km	MPC · JPL
56926	2000 RX_{21}	—	September 1, 2000	Socorro	LINEAR	·	4.0 km	MPC · JPL
56927	2000 RT_{22}	—	September 1, 2000	Socorro	LINEAR	·	4.2 km	MPC · JPL
56928	2000 RF_{27}	—	September 1, 2000	Socorro	LINEAR	·	8.5 km	MPC · JPL
56929	2000 RY_{27}	—	September 1, 2000	Socorro	LINEAR	·	5.5 km	MPC · JPL
56930	2000 RY_{28}	—	September 1, 2000	Socorro	LINEAR	EOS	6.8 km	MPC · JPL
56931	2000 RM_{32}	—	September 1, 2000	Socorro	LINEAR	·	5.9 km	MPC · JPL
56932	2000 RT_{40}	—	September 3, 2000	Socorro	LINEAR	EUP ·	9.3 km	MPC · JPL
56933	2000 RZ_{40}	—	September 3, 2000	Socorro	LINEAR	·	4.0 km	MPC · JPL
56934	2000 RE_{41}	—	September 3, 2000	Socorro	LINEAR	EOS	6.0 km	MPC · JPL
56935	2000 RU_{41}	—	September 3, 2000	Socorro	LINEAR	·	12 km	MPC · JPL
56936	2000 RW_{53}	—	September 1, 2000	Socorro	LINEAR	URS	11 km	MPC · JPL
56937	2000 RD_{64}	—	September 3, 2000	Socorro	LINEAR	·	6.5 km	MPC · JPL
56938	2000 RO_{65}	—	September 1, 2000	Socorro	LINEAR	EUN	6.2 km	MPC · JPL
56939	2000 RC_{68}	—	September 2, 2000	Socorro	LINEAR	·	8.4 km	MPC · JPL
56940	2000 RG_{70}	—	September 2, 2000	Socorro	LINEAR	GEF	4.2 km	MPC · JPL
56941	2000 RQ_{73}	—	September 2, 2000	Socorro	LINEAR	·	4.7 km	MPC · JPL
56942	2000 RL_{75}	—	September 3, 2000	Socorro	LINEAR	VER	12 km	MPC · JPL
56943	2000 RF_{76}	—	September 4, 2000	Socorro	LINEAR	THM	8.8 km	MPC · JPL
56944	2000 RS_{85}	—	September 2, 2000	Socorro	LINEAR	·	7.9 km	MPC · JPL
56945	2000 RG_{88}	—	September 3, 2000	Socorro	LINEAR	·	4.0 km	MPC · JPL
56946	2000 RZ_{88}	—	September 3, 2000	Socorro	LINEAR	·	8.2 km	MPC · JPL
56947	2000 RZ_{93}	—	September 4, 2000	Kitt Peak	Spacewatch	·	6.3 km	MPC · JPL
56948	2000 RR_{98}	—	September 5, 2000	Anderson Mesa	LONEOS	·	8.3 km	MPC · JPL
56949	2000 RQ_{100}	—	September 5, 2000	Anderson Mesa	LONEOS	·	8.5 km	MPC · JPL
56950	2000 SA_{2}	—	September 20, 2000	Socorro	LINEAR	PHO	2.5 km	MPC · JPL
56951	2000 SK_{2}	—	September 20, 2000	Socorro	LINEAR	L5	18 km	MPC · JPL
56952	2000 SU_{3}	—	September 20, 2000	Socorro	LINEAR	NAE	8.1 km	MPC · JPL
56953	2000 SN_{6}	—	September 20, 2000	Socorro	LINEAR	·	10 km	MPC · JPL
56954	2000 SF_{7}	—	September 24, 2000	Bisei SG Center	BATTeRS	·	8.3 km	MPC · JPL
56955	2000 ST_{14}	—	September 23, 2000	Socorro	LINEAR	MAR	4.4 km	MPC · JPL
56956	2000 SH_{19}	—	September 23, 2000	Socorro	LINEAR	·	4.7 km	MPC · JPL
56957 Seohideaki	2000 SY_{20}	Seohideaki	September 24, 2000	Bisei SG Center	BATTeRS	·	8.8 km	MPC · JPL
56958	2000 ST_{28}	—	September 23, 2000	Socorro	LINEAR	·	12 km	MPC · JPL
56959	2000 SU_{45}	—	September 22, 2000	Socorro	LINEAR	·	5.7 km	MPC · JPL
56960	2000 SN_{46}	—	September 23, 2000	Socorro	LINEAR	URS	9.8 km	MPC · JPL
56961	2000 SR_{60}	—	September 24, 2000	Socorro	LINEAR	·	4.0 km	MPC · JPL
56962	2000 SW_{65}	—	September 24, 2000	Socorro	LINEAR	L5	18 km	MPC · JPL
56963	2000 SX_{68}	—	September 24, 2000	Socorro	LINEAR	·	5.4 km	MPC · JPL
56964	2000 SY_{79}	—	September 24, 2000	Socorro	LINEAR	·	5.3 km	MPC · JPL
56965	2000 SJ_{83}	—	September 24, 2000	Socorro	LINEAR	·	7.1 km	MPC · JPL
56966	2000 ST_{86}	—	September 24, 2000	Socorro	LINEAR	·	4.4 km	MPC · JPL
56967	2000 SG_{91}	—	September 23, 2000	Socorro	LINEAR	slow	9.6 km	MPC · JPL
56968	2000 SA_{92}	—	September 23, 2000	Socorro	LINEAR	L5	26 km	MPC · JPL
56969	2000 SW_{106}	—	September 24, 2000	Socorro	LINEAR	·	7.5 km	MPC · JPL
56970	2000 SJ_{111}	—	September 24, 2000	Socorro	LINEAR	LIX	13 km	MPC · JPL
56971	2000 SG_{120}	—	September 24, 2000	Socorro	LINEAR	THM	8.0 km	MPC · JPL
56972	2000 SP_{140}	—	September 23, 2000	Socorro	LINEAR	GEF	2.9 km	MPC · JPL
56973	2000 SA_{142}	—	September 23, 2000	Socorro	LINEAR	·	8.6 km	MPC · JPL
56974	2000 SS_{142}	—	September 23, 2000	Socorro	LINEAR	SYL · CYB	11 km	MPC · JPL
56975 Lindaspilker	2000 SP_{161}	Lindaspilker	September 19, 2000	Haleakala	NEAT	CYB	9.2 km	MPC · JPL
56976	2000 SS_{161}	—	September 20, 2000	Haleakala	NEAT	L5	23 km	MPC · JPL
56977	2000 SB_{173}	—	September 28, 2000	Socorro	LINEAR	·	6.1 km	MPC · JPL
56978	2000 SR_{173}	—	September 28, 2000	Socorro	LINEAR	·	11 km	MPC · JPL
56979	2000 SB_{175}	—	September 28, 2000	Socorro	LINEAR	·	10 km	MPC · JPL
56980	2000 SS_{177}	—	September 28, 2000	Socorro	LINEAR	·	10 km	MPC · JPL
56981	2000 SQ_{182}	—	September 20, 2000	Socorro	LINEAR	·	8.0 km	MPC · JPL
56982	2000 SE_{189}	—	September 22, 2000	Kitt Peak	Spacewatch	HIL · 3:2 · (6124)	13 km	MPC · JPL
56983	2000 SF_{190}	—	September 23, 2000	Kitt Peak	Spacewatch	·	6.0 km	MPC · JPL
56984	2000 SX_{193}	—	September 24, 2000	Socorro	LINEAR	·	6.0 km	MPC · JPL
56985	2000 SR_{202}	—	September 24, 2000	Socorro	LINEAR	3:2 · SHU	9.6 km	MPC · JPL
56986	2000 SR_{210}	—	September 25, 2000	Socorro	LINEAR	·	12 km	MPC · JPL
56987	2000 SR_{211}	—	September 25, 2000	Socorro	LINEAR	CYB	9.0 km	MPC · JPL
56988	2000 SV_{241}	—	September 24, 2000	Socorro	LINEAR	·	4.7 km	MPC · JPL
56989	2000 SS_{242}	—	September 24, 2000	Socorro	LINEAR	KOR	3.3 km	MPC · JPL
56990	2000 SZ_{242}	—	September 24, 2000	Socorro	LINEAR	·	4.2 km	MPC · JPL
56991	2000 SB_{282}	—	September 23, 2000	Socorro	LINEAR	EOS	4.5 km	MPC · JPL
56992	2000 SM_{286}	—	September 25, 2000	Socorro	LINEAR	·	15 km	MPC · JPL
56993	2000 SA_{291}	—	September 27, 2000	Socorro	LINEAR	·	4.2 km	MPC · JPL
56994	2000 SR_{292}	—	September 27, 2000	Socorro	LINEAR	URS	11 km	MPC · JPL
56995	2000 SU_{299}	—	September 28, 2000	Socorro	LINEAR	(5651)	7.5 km	MPC · JPL
56996	2000 SP_{307}	—	September 30, 2000	Socorro	LINEAR	HIL · 3:2	14 km	MPC · JPL
56997	2000 SV_{309}	—	September 25, 2000	Socorro	LINEAR	EUP	13 km	MPC · JPL
56998	2000 SA_{310}	—	September 26, 2000	Socorro	LINEAR	slow	15 km	MPC · JPL
56999	2000 SD_{317}	—	September 30, 2000	Socorro	LINEAR	·	6.4 km	MPC · JPL
57000	2000 SJ_{319}	—	September 26, 2000	Socorro	LINEAR	·	15 km	MPC · JPL

back to top

== See also ==
- Meanings of minor-planet names: 56001–57000
