= Meanings of minor-planet names: 56001–57000 =

As minor planet discoveries are confirmed, they are given a permanent number by the IAU's Minor Planet Center (MPC), and the discoverers can then submit names for them, following the IAU's naming conventions. The list below concerns those minor planets in the specified number-range that have received names, and explains the meanings of those names.

Official naming citations of newly named small Solar System bodies are approved and published in a bulletin by IAU's Working Group for Small Bodies Nomenclature (WGSBN). Before May 2021, citations were published in MPC's Minor Planet Circulars for many decades. Recent citations can also be found on the JPL Small-Body Database (SBDB). Until his death in 2016, German astronomer Lutz D. Schmadel compiled these citations into the Dictionary of Minor Planet Names (DMP) and regularly updated the collection.

Based on Paul Herget's The Names of the Minor Planets, Schmadel also researched the unclear origin of numerous asteroids, most of which had been named prior to World War II. This article incorporates text from this source, which is in the public domain: SBDB New namings may only be added to this list below after official publication as the preannouncement of names is condemned. The WGSBN publishes a comprehensive guideline for the naming rules of non-cometary small Solar System bodies.

== 56001–56100 ==
Named minor planet	Provisional	This minor planet was named for...	Ref · Catalog
56011 Sarahantier	1998 UJ_{16}	Sarah Antier, French astronomer.	IAU · 56011
56018 Yujawang	1998 VH_{4}	Yuja Wang, Chinese American pianist.	IAU · 56018
56038 Jackmapanje	1998 XC_{3}	Jack Mapanje (born 1955) is a Malawian writer. Educated at the University of London, he became head of the Department of Language and Linguistics at the University of Malawi. He moved back to the UK in 1991 and is now a visiting professor at Leeds University.	IAU · 56038
56041 Luciendumont	1998 XO_{4}	Lucien Dumont, aeronautics engineer who worked for the French Railways (SNCF)	JPL · 56041
56067 Argerich	1998 YH_{2}	Martha Argerich, world-renowned Argentine pianist.	IAU · 56067
56073 Poggianti	1998 YO_{10}	Marcello Poggianti (b. 1946), an Italian amateur astronomer.	IAU · 56073
56088 Wuheng	1999 AZ_{23}	Heng Wu, leader and organizer of China's science and technology †	MPC · 56088
56095 Buniatishvili	1999 BL_{6}	Khatia Buniatishvili, Georgian pianist.	IAU · 56095
56100 Luisapolli	1999 BM_{14}	Luisa Polli, sister of the grandmother of the discoverer † ‡	MPC · 56100

== 56101–56200 ==
back to top

Named minor planet	Provisional	This minor planet was named for...	Ref · Catalog
56170 Rolandovillazón	1999 FK_{6}	Rolando Villazón, renowned Mexican-French tenor celebrated for his powerful voice and emotional expressiveness.	IAU · 56170
56172 Véroniquesanson	1999 FD_{7}	Véronique Sanson, French singer-songwriter.	IAU · 56172

== 56201–56300 ==
back to top

Named minor planet	Provisional	This minor planet was named for...	Ref · Catalog
56280 Asemo	1999 KS_{5}	ASEMO, the Astronomical Society of Eastern Missouri	JPL · 56280

== 56301–56400 ==
back to top

Named minor planet	Provisional	This minor planet was named for...	Ref · Catalog
56329 Tarxien	1999 WO_{1}	The Tarxien temples on Malta †	MPC · 56329
56361 Marcomontagni	2000 CW_{1}	Marco Montagni (b. 1956), an Italian amateur astronomer.	IAU · 56361

== 56401–56500 ==
back to top

Named minor planet	Provisional	This minor planet was named for...	Ref · Catalog
56422 Mnajdra	2000 GV_{3}	Mnajdra, prehistoric temple complex built with large limestone blocks, located on the southern coast of Malta	JPL · 56422

== 56501–56600 ==
back to top

Named minor planet	Provisional	This minor planet was named for...	Ref · Catalog
56561 Jaimenomen	2000 JG_{7}	Jaume Nomen (born 1960) Spanish prolific discoverer of minor planets at the Observatorio Astronómico de Mallorca	MPC · 56561

== 56601–56700 ==
back to top

Named minor planet	Provisional	This minor planet was named for...	Ref · Catalog
56678 Alicewessen	2000 LR_{1}	Alice Wessen (born 1957) has worked for over twenty years at NASA's Jet Propulsion Laboratory as Outreach Manager for planetary missions. She is a Co-Investigator for the Planetary Science Education and Public Outreach Forum, and is a recipient of NASA's Exceptional Service Medal.	JPL · 56678

== 56701–56800 ==
back to top

Named minor planet	Provisional	This minor planet was named for...	Ref · Catalog
56788 Guilbertlepoutre	2000 OA_{54}	Aurélie Guilbert-Lepoutre (born 1983) is a CNRS researcher at the Geology Laboratory (Lyon, France) whose studies include thermal modeling of small bodies to understand their formation and evolution.	IAU · 56788
56795 Amandagorman	2000 OE_{67}	Amanda Gorman, inaugural National Youth Poet Laureate. Her poetry appears on a plaque aboard NASA's Lucy space probe.	IAU · 56795

== 56801–56900 ==
back to top

Named minor planet	Provisional	This minor planet was named for...	Ref · Catalog
There are no named minor planets in this number range

== 56901–57000 ==
back to top

Named minor planet	Provisional	This minor planet was named for...	Ref · Catalog
56957 Seohideaki	2000 SY_{20}	Hideaki Seo, the governor of Sundai Gakuen high school.	JPL · 56957
56975 Lindaspilker	2000 SP_{161}	Linda Spilker (b. 1955), senior research scientist and fellow at the Jet Propulsion Laboratory, has been involved in planetary missions throughout her career.	IAU · 56975

back to top

Preceded by 55,001–56,000	Meanings of minor-planet names List of minor planets: 56,001–57,000	Succeeded by 57,001–58,000
