= Bastion House =

Office block in London, England

Coordinates: 51.5180°N 0.0955°W

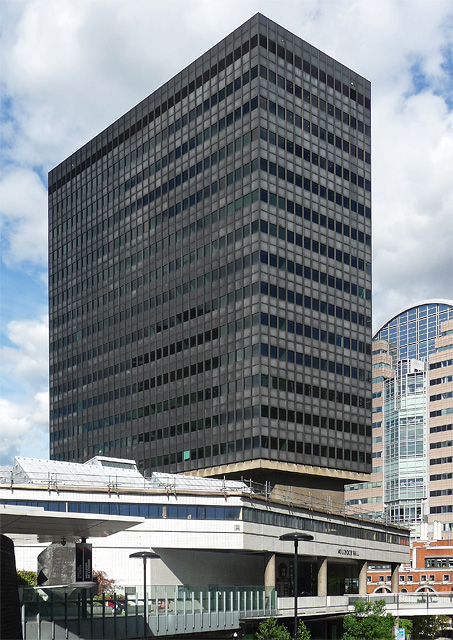
Bastion House in 2011

Bastion House is an office block in the Barbican area of the City of London, England. The building was designed by Powell & Moya and completed in 1976. It has 17 storeys.

Its basement contains the remains of a tower which formed part of the west gate of a Roman fort protecting Londinium. It contained a sentry post and access to the walkway of London Wall. This is often open to the public.

In 2022, plans by the City of London Corporation to demolish the building along with the Museum of London and construct a new office building on the site were opposed by locals. Bastion House was placed on the Twentieth Century Society's Risk List in 2023.

In 2023, while demolition was regarded as the best option to transform the site to provide new public open spaces and cultural attractions, it was clear that there was some desire locally for the Bastion House building to be retained. City of London Corporation explored whether there was a viable alternative. Plans for demolition were approved in April 2024.
