= Twentieth Century Society =

British architectural charity

- Abbreviation: C20
- Formation: 1979 (as The Thirties Society)
- Headquarters: 70 Cowcross Street, London
- Director: Catherine Croft
- Chairman and Trustee: Hugh Pearman
- President: Samira Ahmed
- Website: c20society.org.uk

The Twentieth Century Society (abbreviated to C20), founded in 1979 as The Thirties Society, is a British charity that campaigns for the preservation of architectural heritage from 1914 onwards. It is formally recognised as one of the National Amenity Societies, and as such is a statutory consultee on alterations to listed buildings within its period of interest.

== History ==
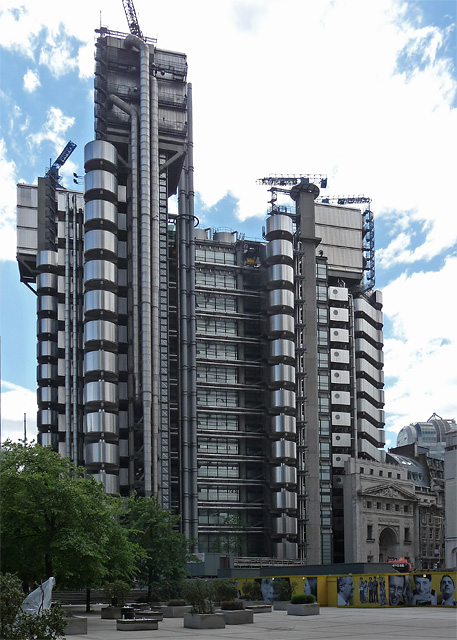
Lloyd's of London's 1920s frontage (seen bottom right) as part of the 1986 Rogers design

The catalyst to form the society was the proposal to replace Lloyd's of London's Classical-style 1920s headquarters with a new modernist Richard Rogers building. Marcus Binney (founder of Save Britain's Heritage), John Harris (director of the RIBA drawings collection) and Simon Jenkins (editor of London's Evening Standard) felt that the existing building "represented a whole body of important architecture of the period that deserved more sympathetic assessment". Ultimately the façade of the 1920s building was retained and received a Grade II listing in 1977. It was incorporated into Rogers' 1986 design.

Established in December 1979, the Thirties Society, as it was initially called, had offices at 21 Cambridge Street, London. Its organisation was modelled on the Georgian Group and the Victorian Society, and its initial intention was to preserve architecture from the 1930s, by calling for "statutory protection from the Department of the Environment for the protection of important buildings and interiors". Speaking of the need for the society, Jenkins, the vice-chairman, said "It's easier to find examples of architecture from the 1890s than the 1930s, and although there are buildings which I find absolutely hideous, there are architectural reasons why they should be preserved." In 1992, a spokesperson for English Heritage said, "We have found the Thirties Society proposals are usually well supported. It has been very influential in saving some of the best twentieth-century buildings."

=== Founding members ===
Founding members included:

- Bevis Hillier, chairman
- Simon Jenkins, vice-chairman (ex-editor of the London Evening Standard)
- Sir Osbert Lancaster, president
- Clive Aslet, secretary (Country Life)
- Stephen Bayley (University of Kent)
- Marcus Binney (Save Britain's Heritage)
- William Feaver (art critic, The Observer)
- Celina Fox (Museum of London)
- John Harris (Curator, RIBA)
- Dennis Sharp (Architectural Association)
- Gavin Stamp (author, architectural historian)

The society of "young fogeys" as they were called invited Maxwell Fry, Jane Drew, Sir Sacheverell Sitwell, Lady Diana Cooper, Sir John Betjeman and Peter Fleetwood-Hesketh to be patrons. They also considered Douglas Fairbanks Jr. and David Niven but "there was some concern that the stars of the Twenties and Thirties might not be around long enough to warrant putting their names on the letterhead." Norman St John Stevas, Minister for the Arts, attended the launch party.

Catherine Croft, the current director, took over the position from Kenneth Powell in 2002.

=== Name ===
There was a debate over the society's name. The Inter-War Society was considered too martial and it was joked that The Twenties and Thirties Society sounded too much like a dating service. The name The Thirties Society was eventually settled on. The name was changed to The Twentieth Century Society (abbreviated to C20) in 1992, about which Stamp said, "Much as I like the very English anomaly of a body called The Thirties Society defending buildings of the 1950s, the fact is that our name obscures our aims. We defend buildings put up as late as the 1970s."

=== Manchester branch ===
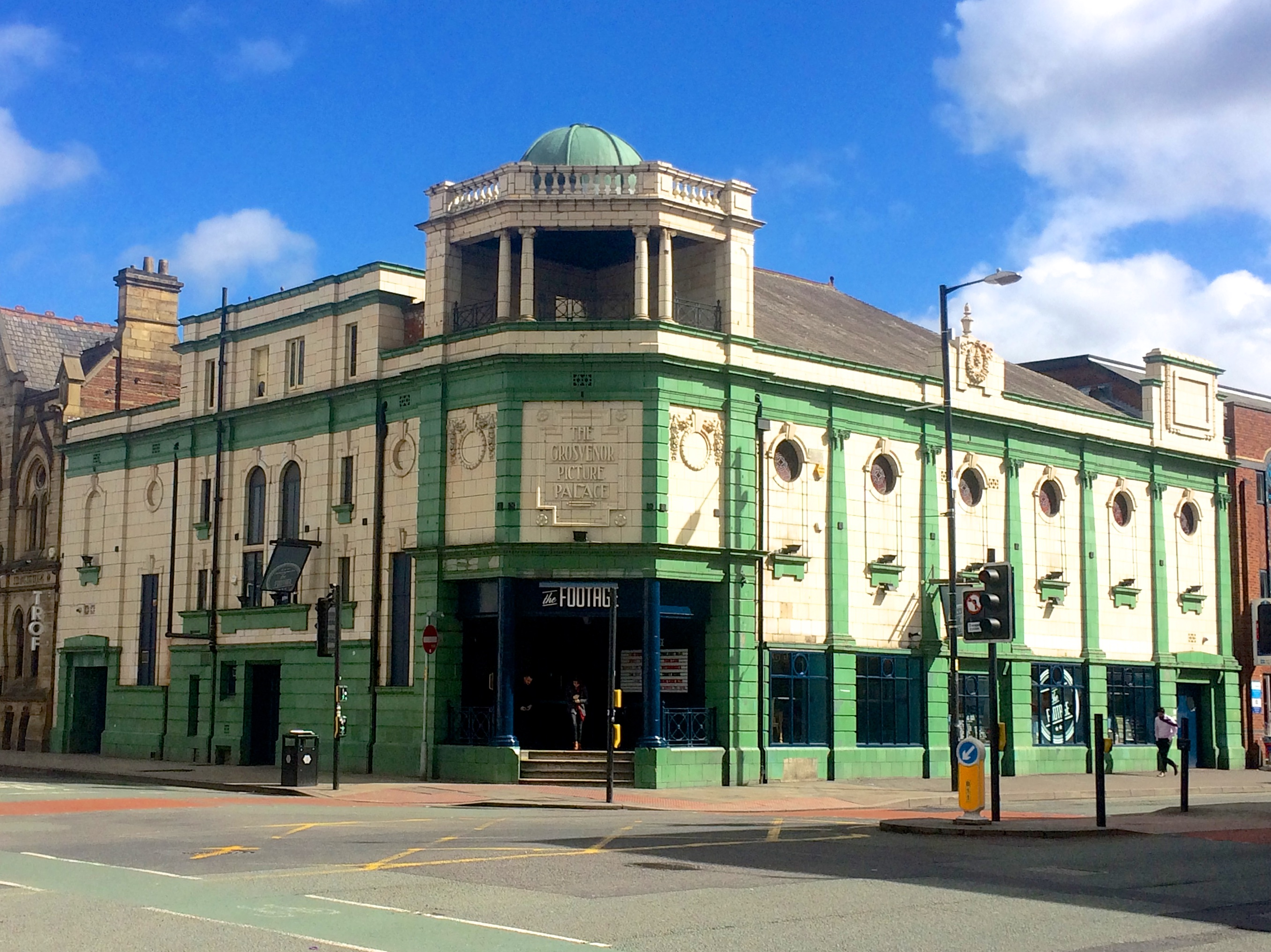
Former Grosvenor Picture Palace (now a pub), Manchester

In 1982, a Manchester branch of the society was formed, with a focus on the Grosvenor Picture Palace on All Saints Street, which was under threat of demolition.

=== Other activities ===
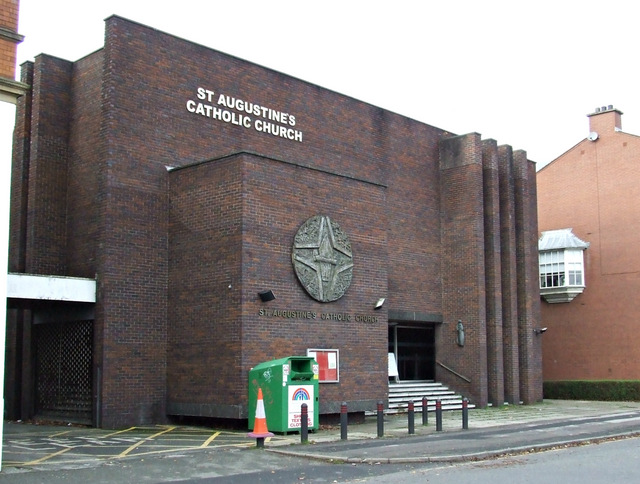
St Augustine Church, Manchester, which was included in C20's 40 Buildings Saved.

The society held its first conference, on the seventies, in 1999.

The society published a journal between 1981 and 2018; initially entitled The Thirties Society Journal it became Twentieth Century Architecture from 1994.

In 2019, to mark the society's 40th anniversary, they curated a list of 40 Buildings Saved, a collection of 40 "buildings which would not have survived without our intervention" including Jubilee Pool in Penzance, Plymouth's Civic Centre and St. Augustine in Manchester.

== The Risk List ==
In 1998, the society released a Buildings at Risk report, which included Pimlico School, Romney House and Simpson's Building. Of the report, Bronwen Edwards, a C20 caseworker, said, "What is indisputable is these buildings are a unique record of social, economic and architectural history – a vivid reminder of the way people lived, worked and played through the century."

Starting in 2015, the society has published The Risk List (a play on the Rich List) every two years, which highlights ten buildings that the society believes are "in danger of either substantial alteration or demolition".

The bi-annual lists are as follows:

Year	Building	Location	Status
2015	St Peter's Seminary	Cardross	Positive solution found
2015	Western Morning News HQ	Plymouth	Positive solution found
2015	Hyde Park Barracks	London	Bid to be listed was rejected (2015)
2015	Robin Hood Gardens	London	Demolished
2015	New Congregation Synagogue	Liverpool	Grade II* listed. Approval given to turn it into a series of apartments (2017)
2015	Bernat Klein Studio	Edinburgh	Listed Category A. On Buildings at Risk register for Scotland.
2015	Church of the Holy Cross	Merseyside	Listed Grade II
2015	Town Hall	Hove	Bid to be listed was rejected (2014)
2015	Salvation Army hostel	Newcastle	Grade II listed. Put up for sale (2021)
2015	Sainsbury's Millennium Store	Greenwich	Demolished
2015	Civic Offices	Durham	Demolished
2017	Dunelm House	Durham	Granted Grade II listing (2021)
2017	BHS murals	Stockport and Hull	Granted Grade II listing (2019)
2017	Reform Synagogue and Police Station	Manchester	Demolished
2017	Central Hill	London	Bid to be listed was rejected (2019)
2017	The Elephant and Swimming Baths	Coventry	Baths are listed Grade II. Elephant was refused listing
2017	High Cross House	Devon	Awaiting restoration
2017	Cumberbatch North and South Buildings	Oxford	Demolished
2017	St. Leonards Church	St. Leonards-on-Sea	Grade II listed
2017	60 Hornton Street	West Kensington	Demolished
2017	Holborn Library	Holborn	Bid to be listed was rejected (2010)
2019	Alton Estate	Roehampton	No longer threatened (as of 2023)
2019	Fawley Power Station	Hampshire	Demolished (2021)
2019	Walton Court	Surrey	Demolished
2019	Richmond House	London	Grade II* listed
2019	British Library Centre for Conservation	London	
2019	BFI IMAX Cinema	London	Certificate of Immunity
2019	Civic Centre	Sunderland	Demolished (2022)
2019	Homebase Superstore	Brentford	At risk of demolishing for new housing (2022)
2019	Ardudwy Theatre and Residential Tower	Merionydd	Grade II* listed. Up for sale.
2019	All Saints' Pastoral Centre and Chapel	Hertfordshire	Occupied by an international school
2021	Oasis Leisure Centre	Swindon	Granted Grade II listing
2021	City Hall	London	Certificate of Immunity
2021	Civic Centre	Swansea	Plans to retain (as of 2023)
2021	Derby Assembly Rooms	Derby	Plans to retain (as of 2023)
2021	Bull Yard	Coventry	Demolished and murals relocated
2021	The Lawns, Halls of Residence	Hull	Listed Grade II*
2021	Cressingham Gardens' Estate	London	Bid to be listed was rejected
2021	Electricity Board HQ	London	Bid to be listed in 2017 was rejected
2021	Swimming pool	Halifax	
2021	Shirehall	Shrewsbury	
2023	Channel 4 headquarters	London	Grade II listed in 2023
2023	Museum of London	London	
2023	Jagonari Centre	London	
2023	Bastion House	London	
2023	Norco House	Aberdeen	
2023	Riviera Hotel	Weymouth	Grade II listed since 1997. At risk from "decline and neglect".
2023	Point	Weymouth	
2023	Ringway Centre	Birmingham	
2023	County Hall	Cardiff	
2023	West Burton power station cooling towers	West Burton	
2023	Scottish Widows building	Edinburgh	Currently listed
2025	National Centre for Popular Music	Sheffield	
2025	Grand National Rollercoaster	Blackpool	
2025	St James' Park	Newcastle	
2025	Bury Market Hall	Bury, Greater Manchester	
2025	Former National Wildflower Centre	Merseyside	
2025	Brighton and Hove Reform Synagogue	Hove	Grade II listed in 2025
2025	Sunwin House	Bradford	
2025	Archaeolink Centre	Aberdeenshire	
2025	Penallta Pithead Baths and Canteen	Caerphilly	
2025	Patera Prototype	London	

== Cases and campaigns ==
=== 1970s ===
==== 1979 ====
- The Oxo Tower, designed by Albert Moore in 1929 was threatened with redevelopment, but was subsequently designated part of a conservation area.

=== 1980s ===
==== 1980 ====
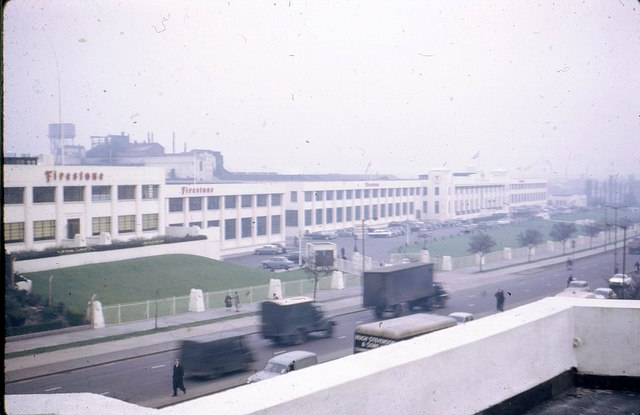
Firestone Factory

- The society's first high-profile case was the Art Deco Firestone Tyre Factory (built 1928) in West London. In anticipation of its being listed, the building was demolished by its owners over a bank holiday weekend.

==== 1982 ====
- The society protested the proposal to develop Memorial Court, designed by Sir Giles Gilbert Scott at Clare College, Cambridge, saying the new building would "destroy the vista which gives coherence to Scott's design".

==== 1983 ====
- Arthur Scargill "incurred the formidable wrath" of the society, when the National Union of Mineworkers moved headquarters, leaving its 1950s 222 Euston Road location open to threat of demolition. The building was saved.

==== 1984 ====
- Terence Conran's application to change the windows of 1930's Heal's on Tottenham Court Road was opposed by the society. Of Conran, Stamp said "He has turned out to be rather a crude shopkeeper." Their objection ultimately failed.

==== 1985 ====
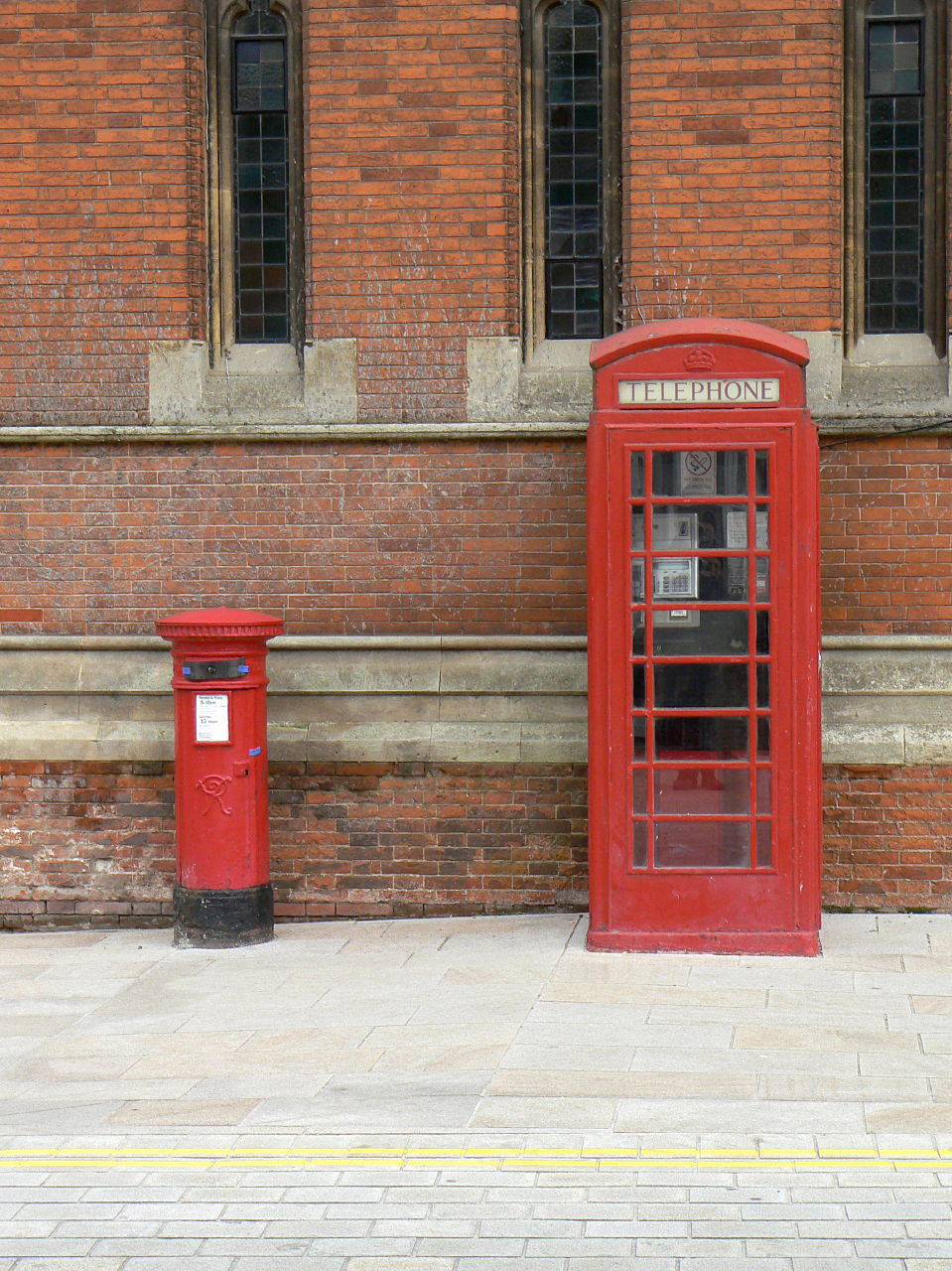
Red telephone box

- The society spoke out against British Telecom's (BT) attempt to remove the traditional Giles Gilbert Scott-designed red phone boxes. They campaigned for as many as possible to be saved, by contacting every local authority in Britain. A spokesman for the society said, "They fit extraordinarily into their surroundings, whether urban or rural, and they are the most satisfactory neighbours to historic buildings." Ultimately 500 boxes were saved, under a 1987 agreement between the British government, BT and English Heritage. By 1992, 1,200 of the early designed boxes were listed, with a further 18,000 kept in use by BT.
- The society's objection to the alteration to Hoover's cafeteria was unsuccessful, with permission to renovate granted by Ealing Council.

==== 1986 ====
- A fundraising campaign, in conjunction with Save Britain's Heritage, was launched to save Monkton House in Sussex, a surrealist mansion. Stamp said "I cannot think of another 20th century house with its contents intact which is so worth keeping."
- Sudbury Town tube station, (rebuilt 1930), was updated in consultation with the society, among others.
- Together with Save Britain's Heritage, the society proposed that Brynmawr rubber factory designed by Architects' Co-Partnership in Gwent, Wales (built 1946–1952), was repurposed as a re-training centre. The building was given a Grade II* listing, the first post-war building in the UK to receive such a listed status but remained empty. The building was ultimately demolished in 2001.

==== 1987 ====
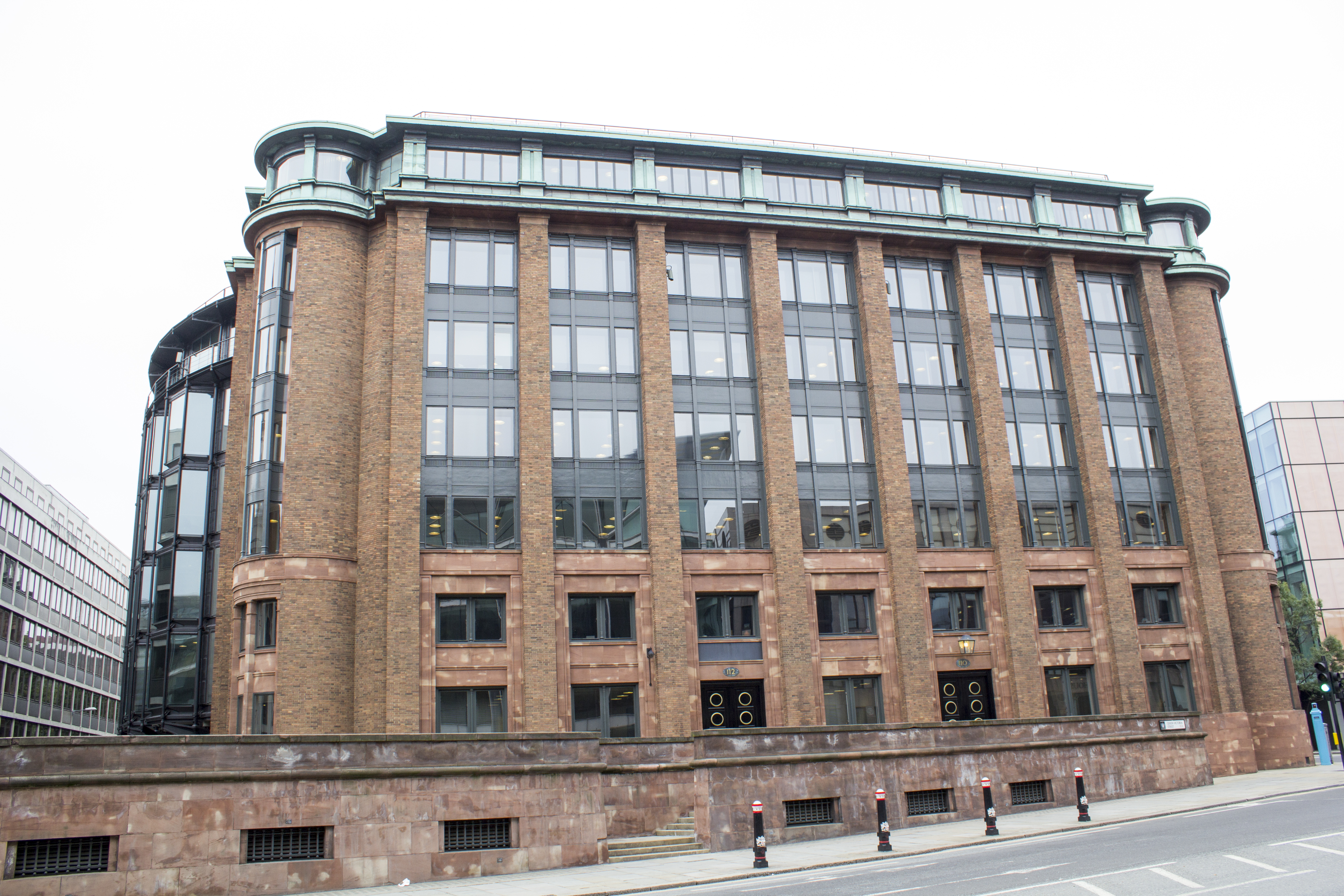
Bracken House

- The society joined several groups in opposing British Coal's plans to demolish the Grade II listed Frizzell baths at Lynemouth Colliery in Northumberland (built 1938). The campaign was successful, with the Secretary of State for the Environment rejecting British Coal's proposal.
- After publishing a report The End of the Tunnel, in conjunction with The Victorian Society, the society held "top level talks" regarding concerns over "widespread destruction" of older underground stations.
- Together with Save Britain's Heritage, the society opposed the demolition of Bracken House (built 1959) in the City, London, with Stamp describing it as "the one thing that isn't rubbish." It was listed in August 1987, becoming "the first major post-war building to be listed".
- After pressure from the society, the British government changed its stance on listing post-war buildings, allowing "buildings of special architectural or historical importance" to be listed if they were minimum 30 years old, or in exceptional circumstances 10.

==== 1988 ====
- The society joined the Urban Design Group's list of signatories in support of the Prince of Wales' "role as scourge of glass stumps and carbuncles".

==== 1989 ====
- The society urged Wandsworth Council and English Heritage to save Battersea Power Station from "demolition by demoralisation".

=== 1990s ===
==== 1991 ====
- Concern was expressed about the future of London Zoo, which needed £13 million worth of repairs to 70 buildings.
- The society backed CAMRA's campaign to save historic pubs from "bogus 'period' facelifts". One success was Prospect Inn in Thanet, Kent, designed by Oliver Hill (built 1937), which was listed as Grade II.
- The society called for the preservation of the Cheltenham Estate in North Kensington (built 1968–1975), designed by Ernö Goldfinger. The society called for the Nottingham Playhouse (built 1964) to be declared architecturally significant.
- The "Lido campaign" called for the preservation of outdoor pools, including the Jubilee Pool (built 1935) in Penzance.
- Odeon House, designed by C Edmund Wilford (built 1930s) was to be saved from demolition in Sutton Coldfield. It received Grade II listing in 1998.
- The society objected to a proposed 25-foot-tall fountain to commemorate the Queen's 40 years as monarch, planned for Parliament Square, London. The fountain was not built.

==== 1994 ====
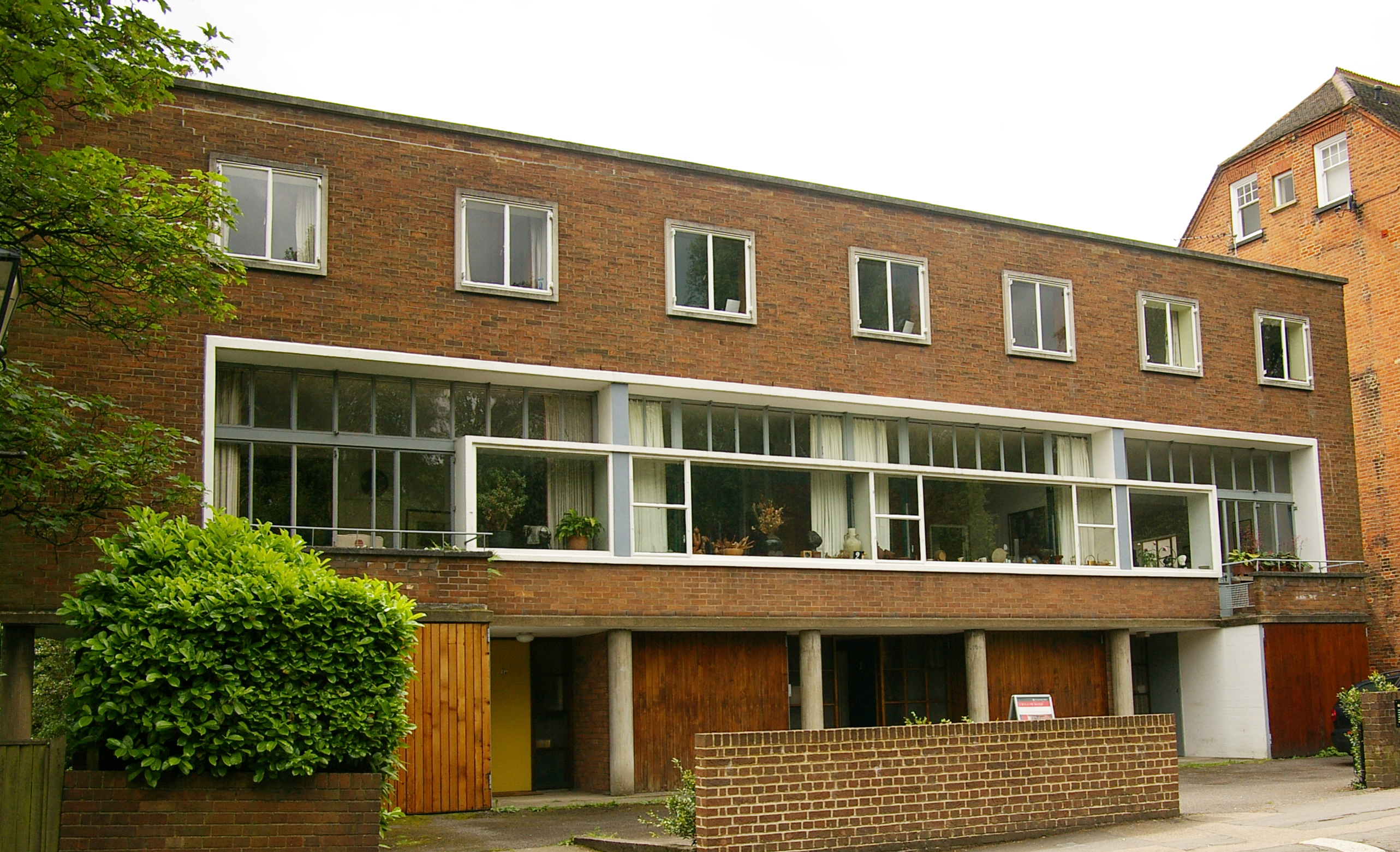
2 Willow Road

- The society suggested ten concrete bridges spanning the M1 to be listed as historic monuments.
- The society successfully encouraged the National Trust to add Erno Goldfinger's home, 2 Willow Road, (built 1939) to its portfolio. It was opened to the public in 1995.
- The society successfully prevented the demolition of Tunstall's Barber's Palace cinema frontage (built 1920) citing it as an "interesting example of 1920s Modernist Movement architecture".

==== 1995 ====
- The society protested a glass lift being installed in Liverpool Cathedral, saying it would "reduce the awe and majesty of this fine building".
- The society joined English Heritage in successfully protesting the modernisation of Totnes' post office on Fore Street.

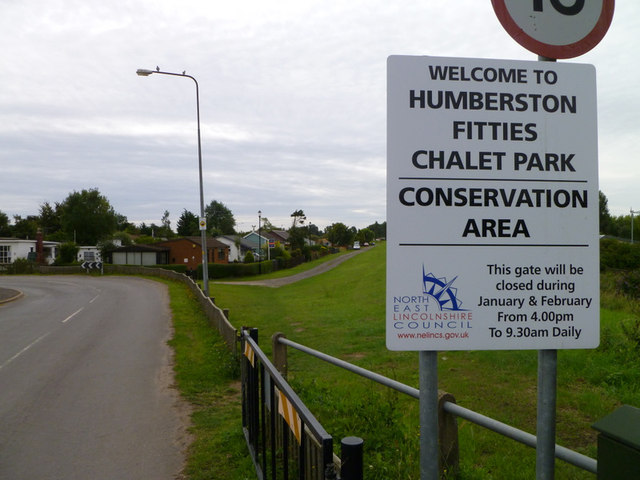
Humberston Fitties

==== 1996 ====
- The society backed Humberston Fitties residents' appeal to become a conservation area. The appeal was successful, followed by an Article 4 direction in 1998, which ensured the area's character was preserved.
- The society saved a 1960s concrete frieze in Coventry city centre from being removed, stating it was "one of only two examples of Mexican-style public art on pub fronts in the country".

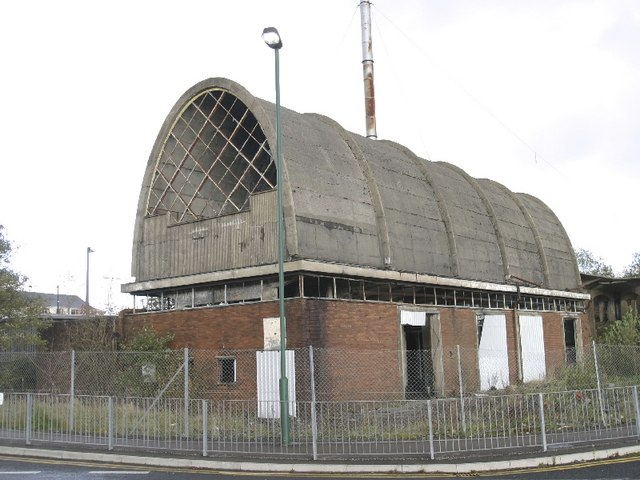
Dunlop Semtex Factory

- The society objected to the demolishing of the Dunlop Semtex Factory, Gwent (built 1945). It was the focus of "many students of architecture, including Frank Lloyd Wright" for the dome structure of its roof and concrete contours. It was authorised for demolition in the same year.
- The society objected to the demolishing of the Empire Pool in Cardiff. It was authorised for demolition in 1999 to make way for the Millennium Stadium.
- The society called for the preservation of Uxbridge's Lido, calling for it to be listed. It was granted Grade II listing in 1998.

==== 1997 ====
- Together with English Heritage, the society proposed Derby bus station, the UK's first purpose-built bus station (built 1933), be granted listed status. It closed in 2005 and was demolished the following year.

=== 21st century ===
==== 2002 ====
- The society joined the Ancient Monuments Society in trying to save the grade II listed private home Greenside in Virginia Water (built 1937) designed by Connell, Ward and Lucas, from demolition. The following year the owners demolished it without consent, "arguing that the Human Rights Act justified his actions".

==== 2005 ====
- The society submitted an application for Sheffield's Crucible Theatre to be listed. The application was successful, with Grade II listing status given in 2007.

==== 2013 ====
- The society's appeal for Swindon's Renault Distribution Centre (built 1982), designed by Norman Foster to be listed was successful.
- After many years of campaigning for the listing of Building Design Partnership's 1969 Preston bus station, it was granted listed status.

==== 2015 ====
- The society called to save parts of the Eduardo Paolozzi mosaic, installed at the Tottenham Court Road station (created 1984). Threatened with permanent removal as part of the station's overhaul, the Society arranged for the decorative arch designs to be restored at the University of Edinburgh, where Paolozzi studied.

==== 2022 ====
- The society called for the Trinity Laban Conservatoire of Music and Dance in Deptford to be listed. If successful, it would become "the youngest building on the list – and the first 21st Century building to make the cut".

==== 2023 ====
- The society campaigned to save Bristol's NCP Rupert Street Car Park, (built 1959–60). The car park, which was built in 1959–1960 was set to be replaced with a 21-storey apartment building, but the Twentieth Century Society argued that the car park should be preserved because it was "a good example of an absolutely pivotal building type from the 20th century".

== Successes ==
The following are some of the buildings and objects that the society has successfully campaigned to save:

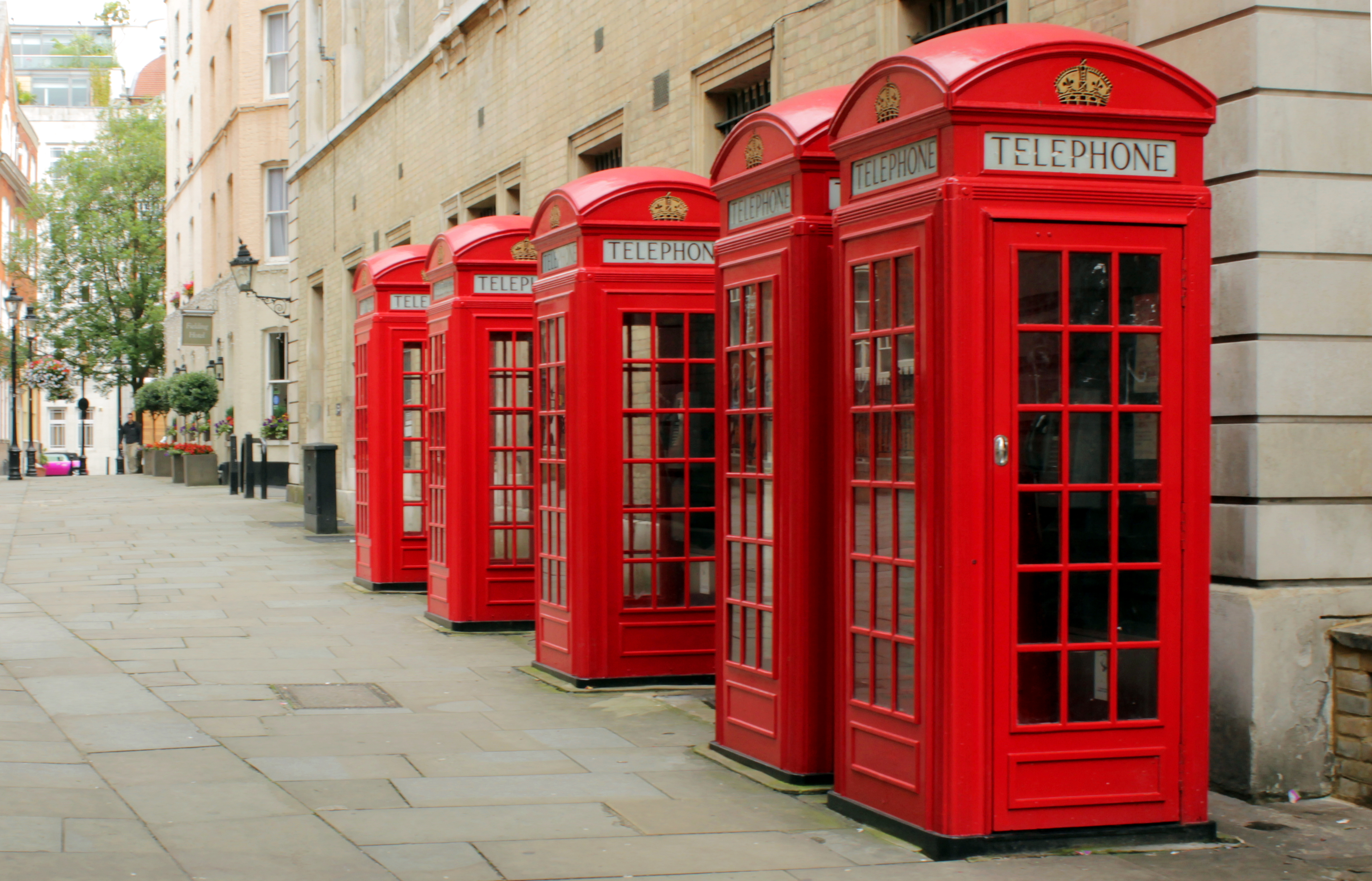
K2 phone boxes, Covent Garden

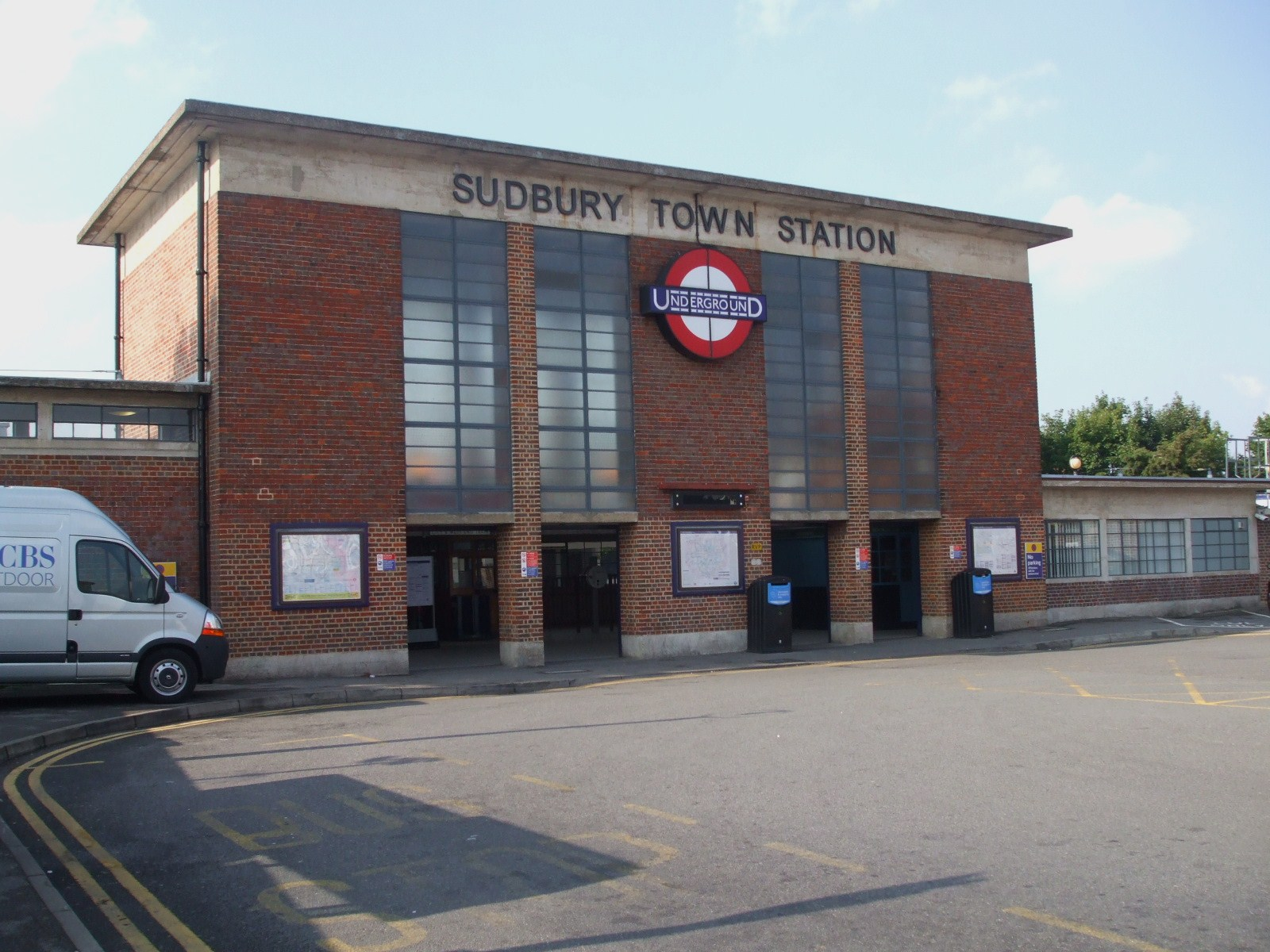
Sudbury Town tube station

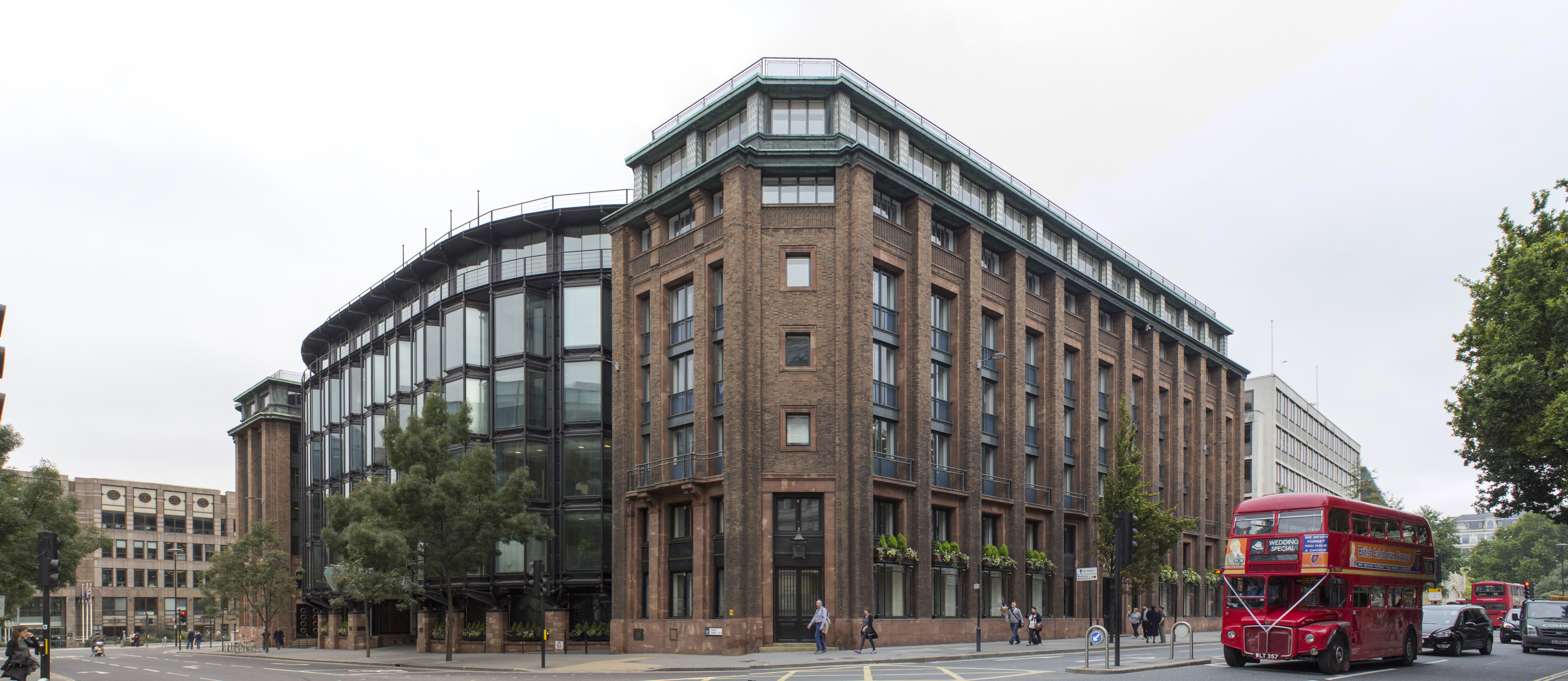
Bracken House, London

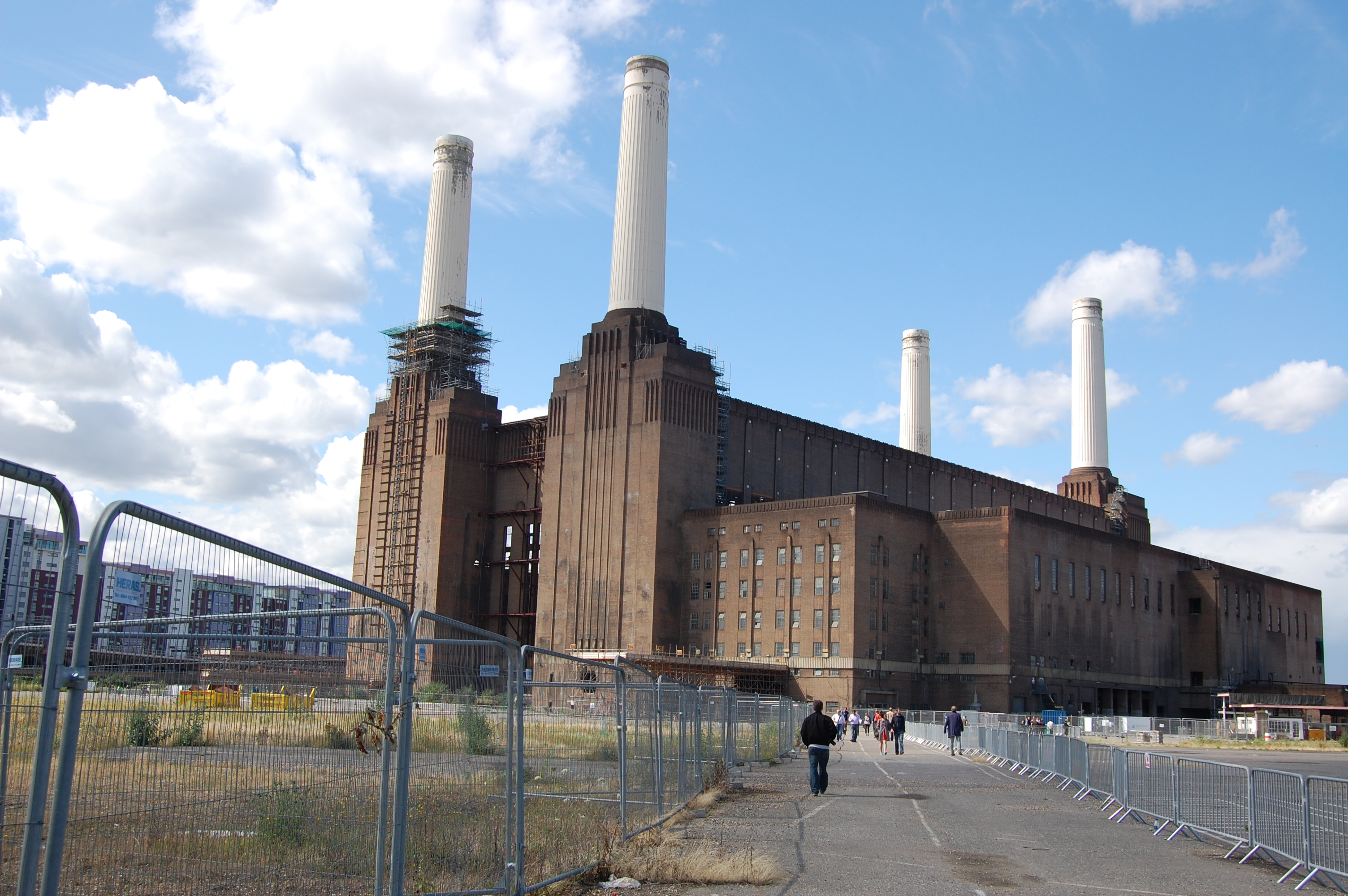
Battersea Power Station, London

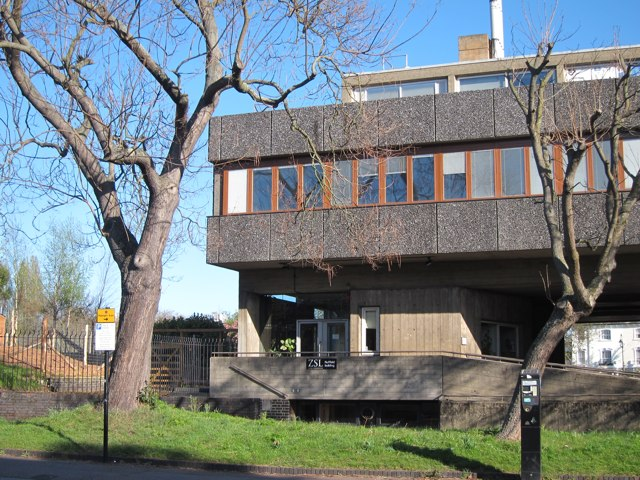
London Zoo

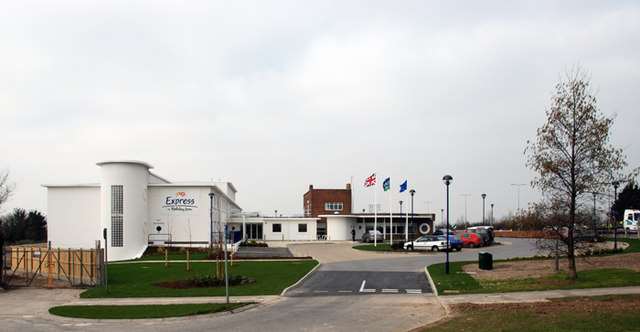
Prospect Inn, Thanet (now a hotel)

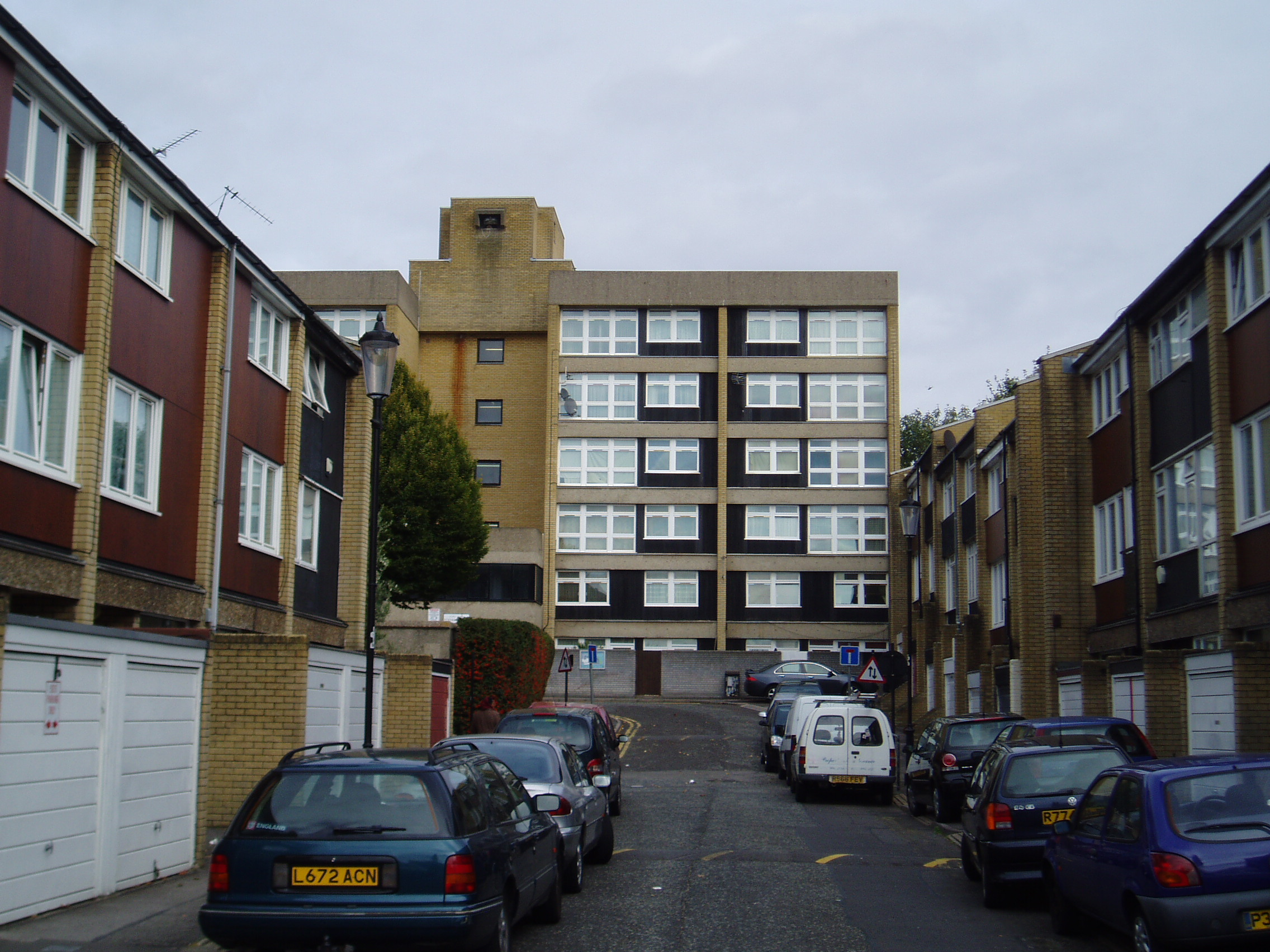
Cheltenham Estate, North Kensington

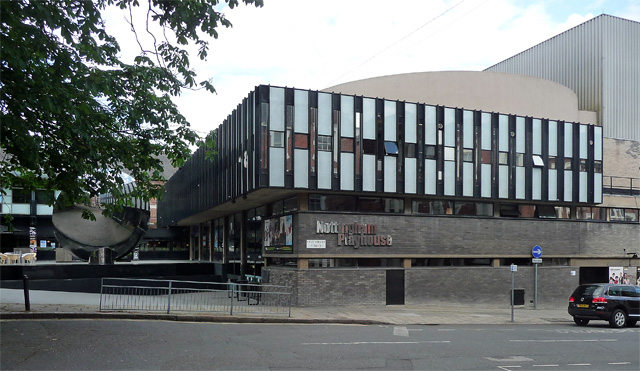
Nottingham Playhouse

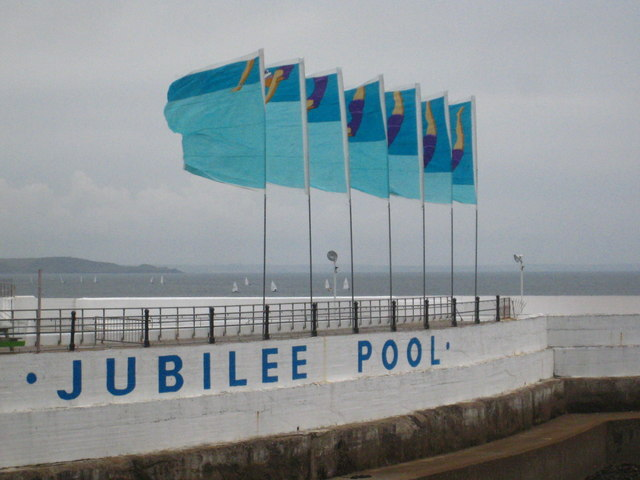
Jubilee Pool, Penzance

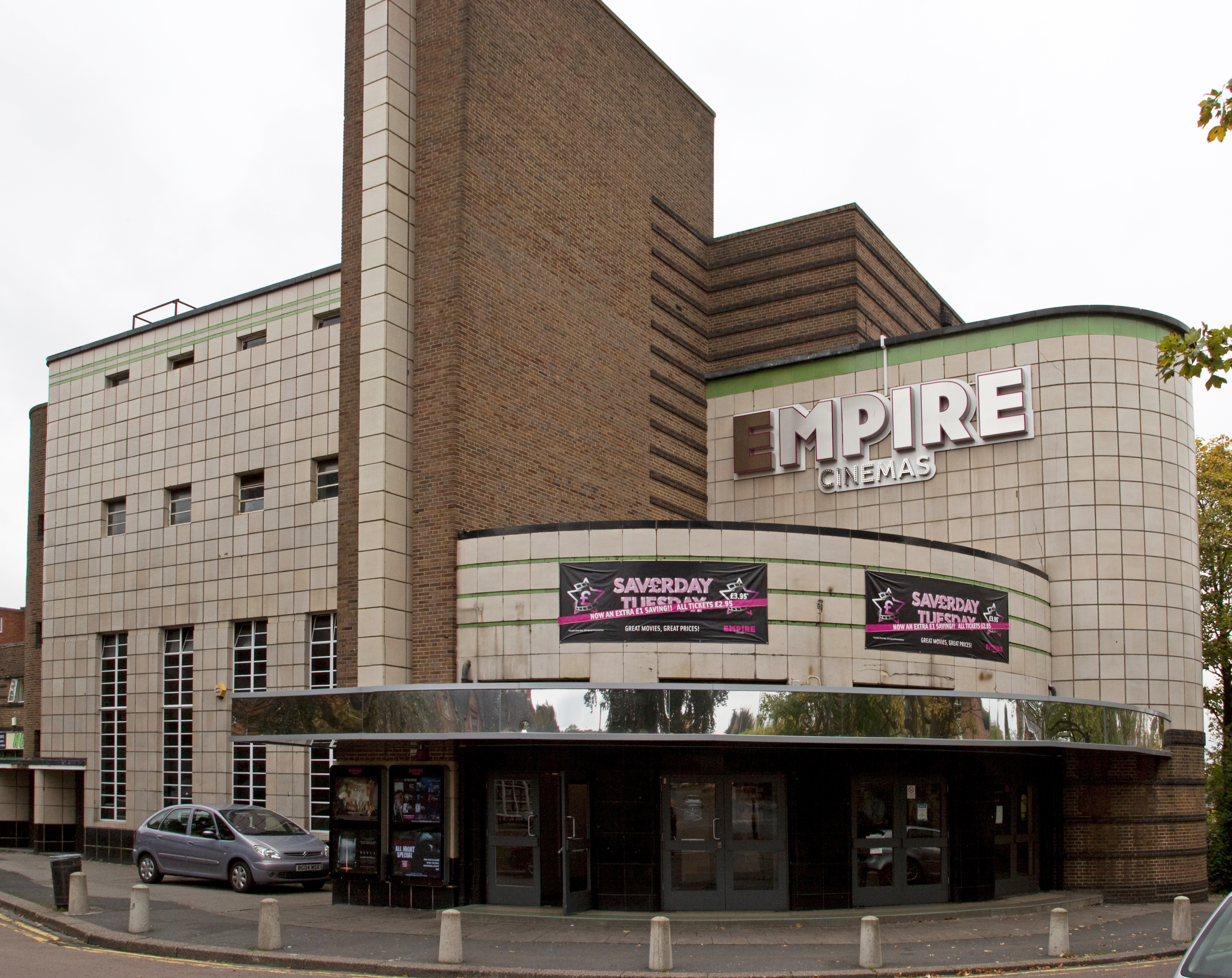
Odeon Cinema, Sutton Coldfield

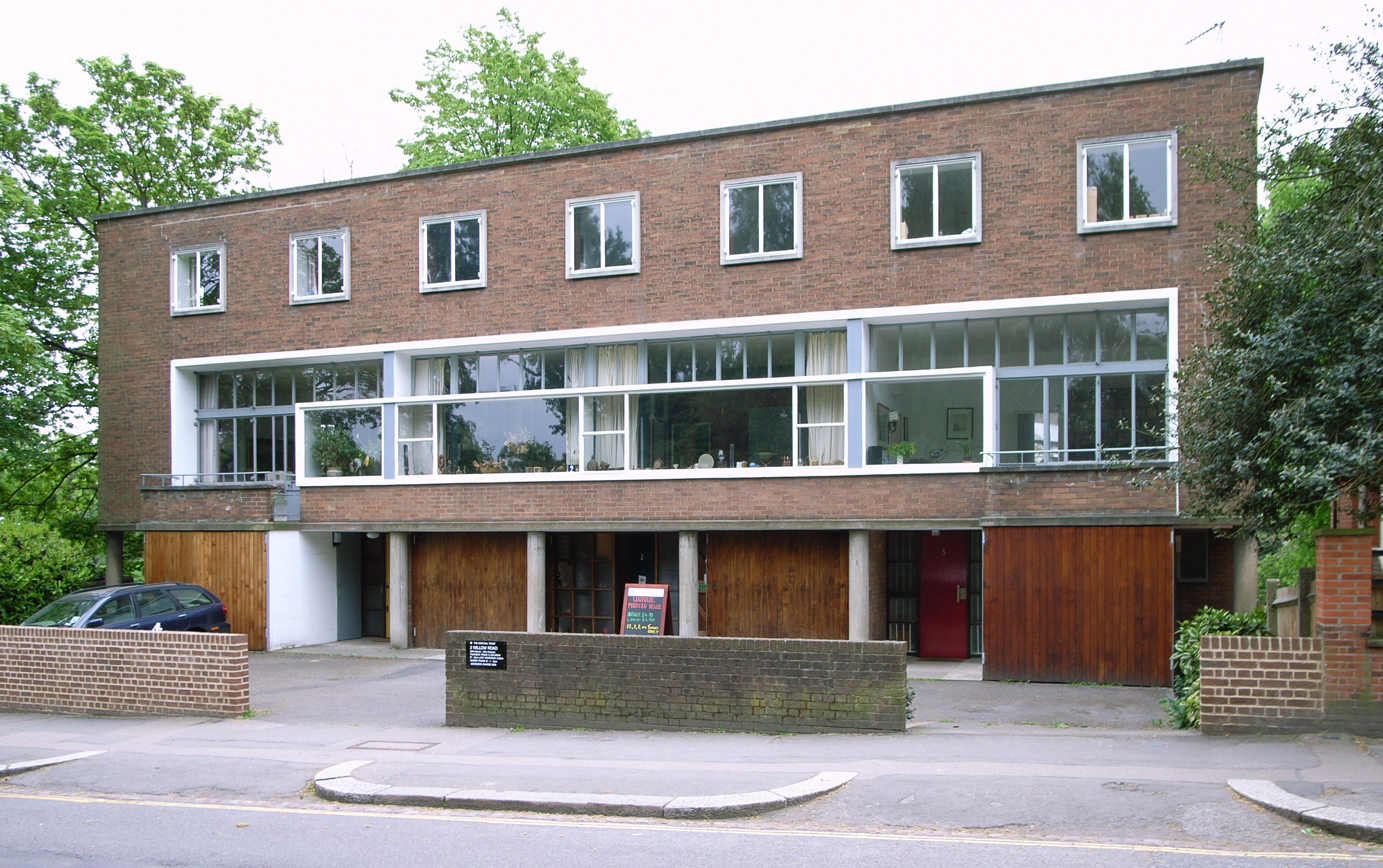
2 Willow Road, London

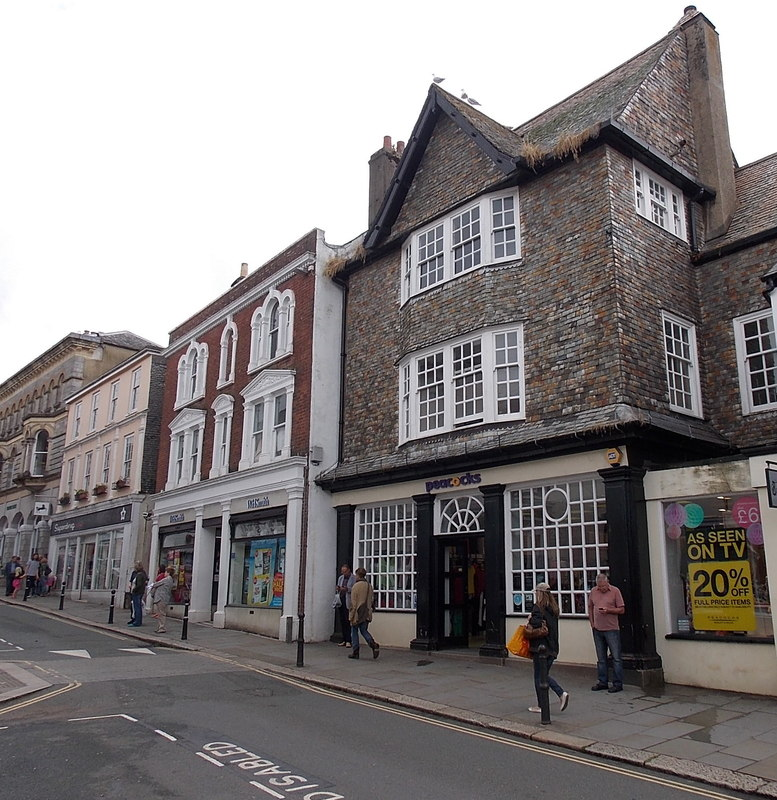
Former Post Office, Totnes

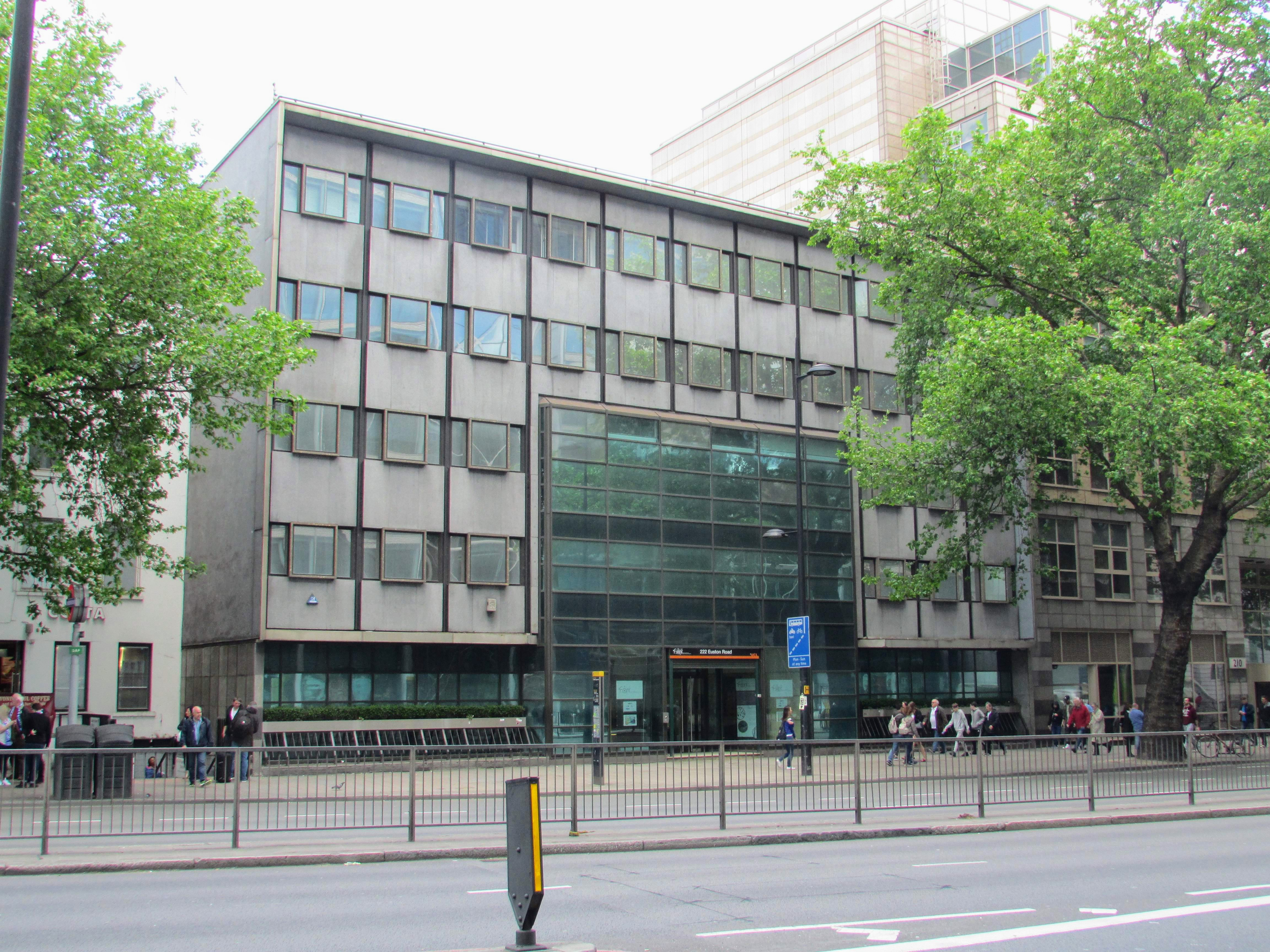
222 Euston Road, former National Union of Miners HQ

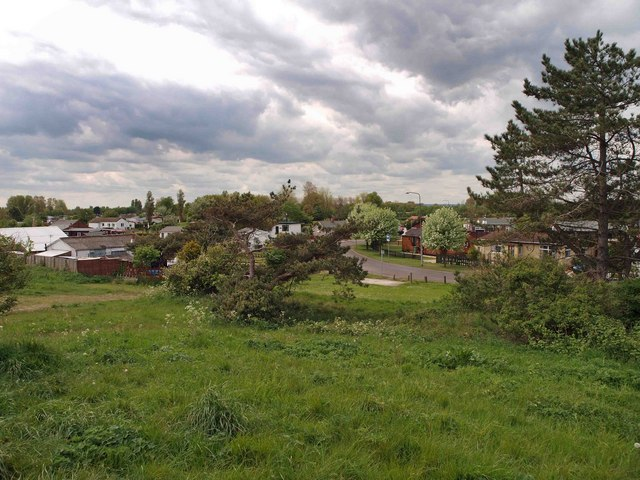
Humberston Fitties, Grimsby

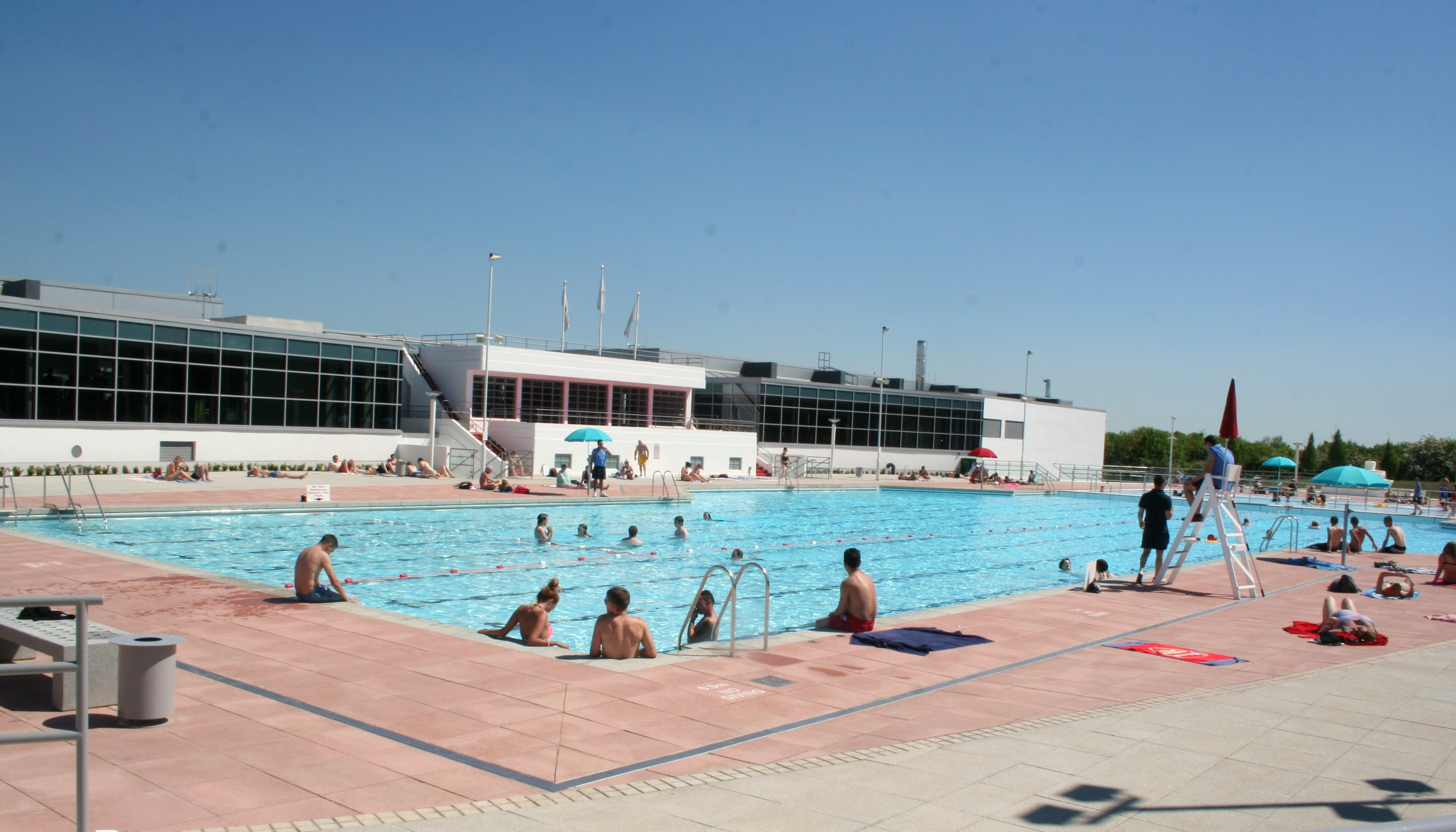
Hillingdon Sports and Leisure Complex (formerly Uxbridge Lido), Uxbridge

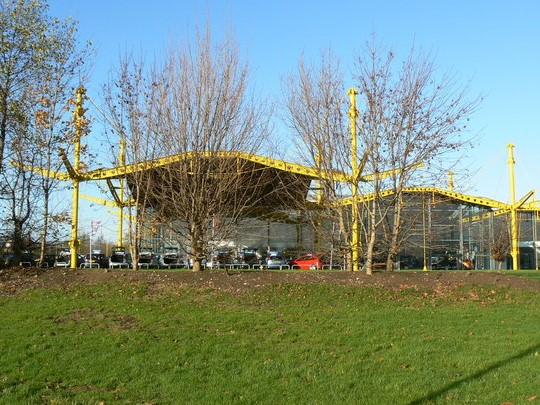
Renault Distribution Centre, Swindon

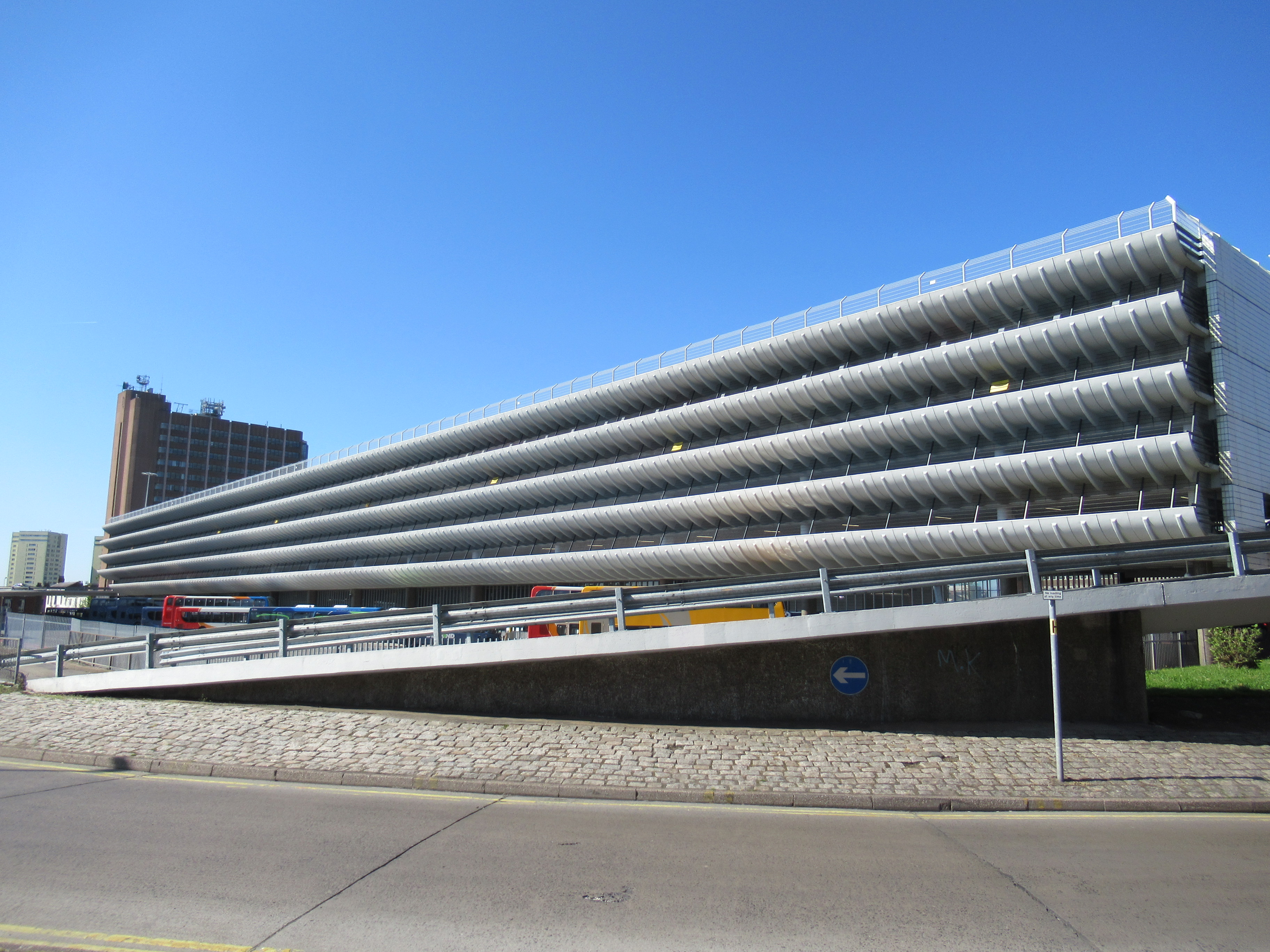
Bus station, Preston

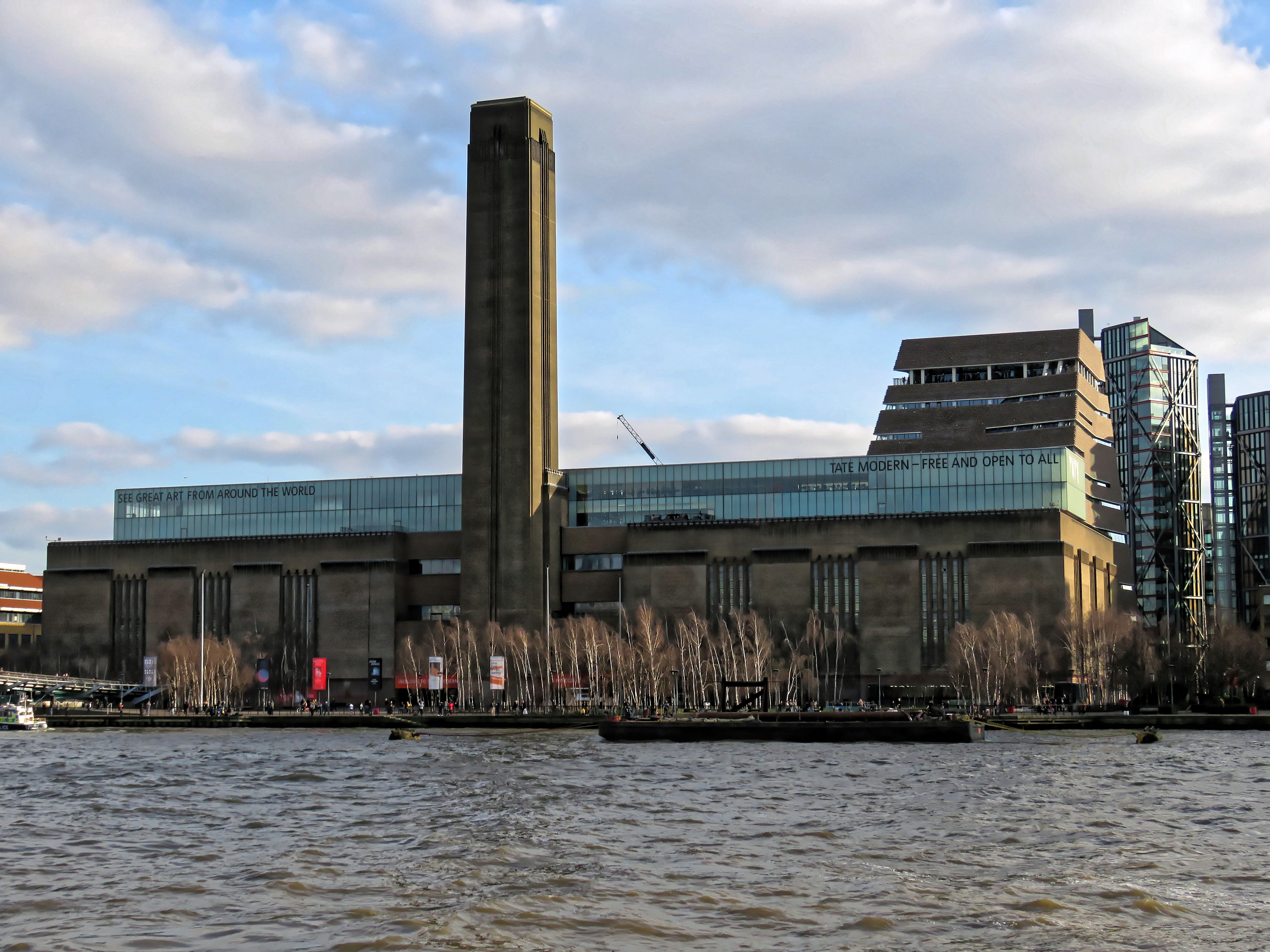
Bankside Power Station (now Tate Modern)

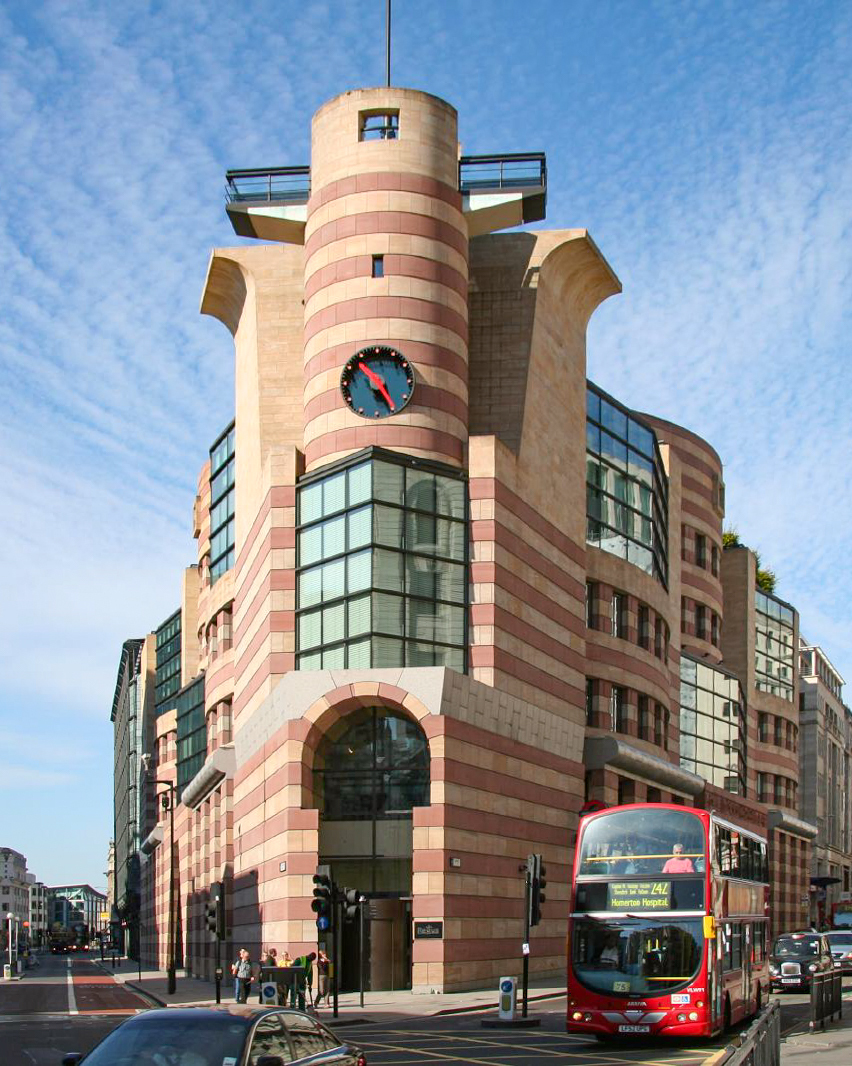
No 1 Poultry, London

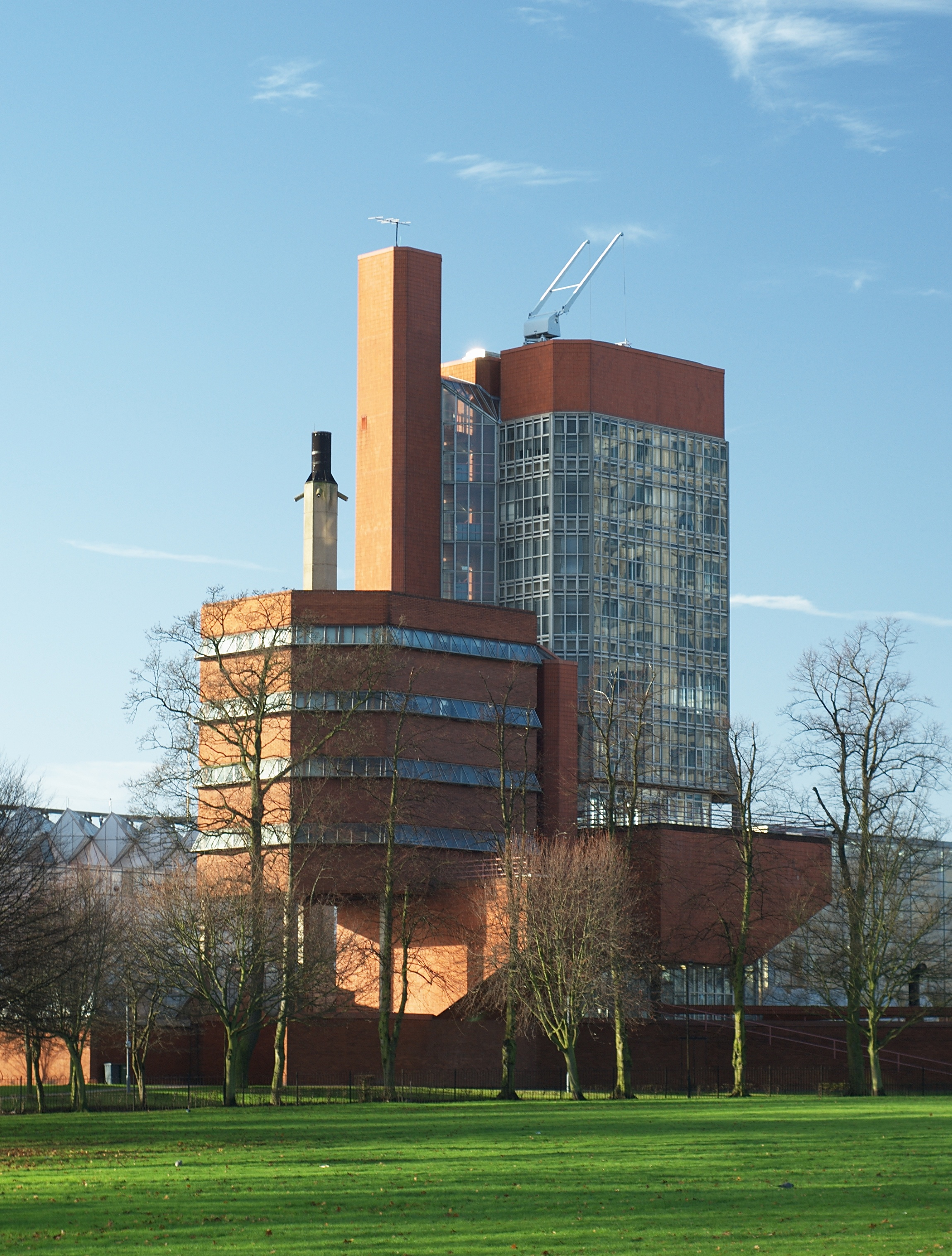
Engineering building, University of Leicester

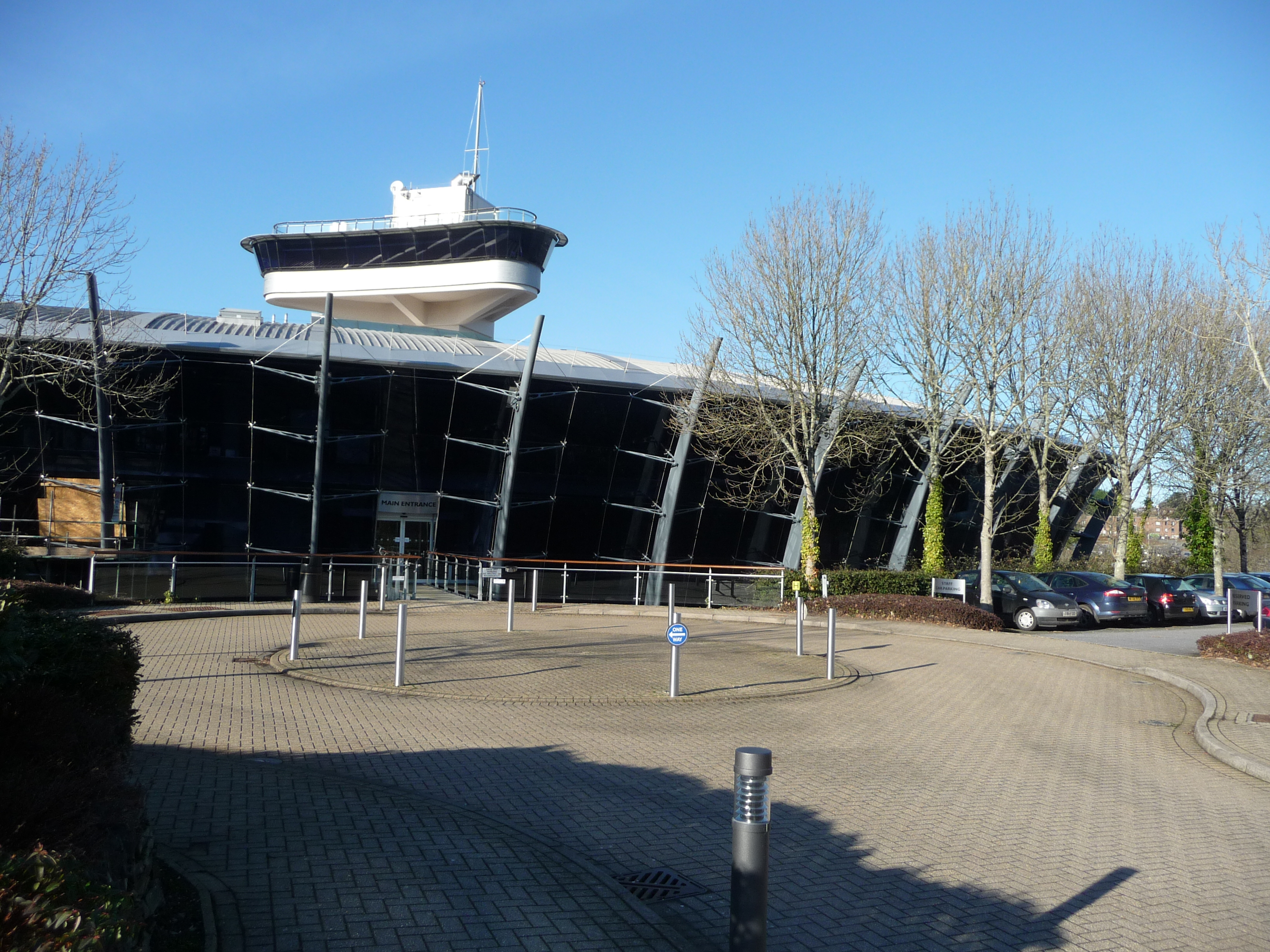
Former Western Morning News HQ, Plymouth

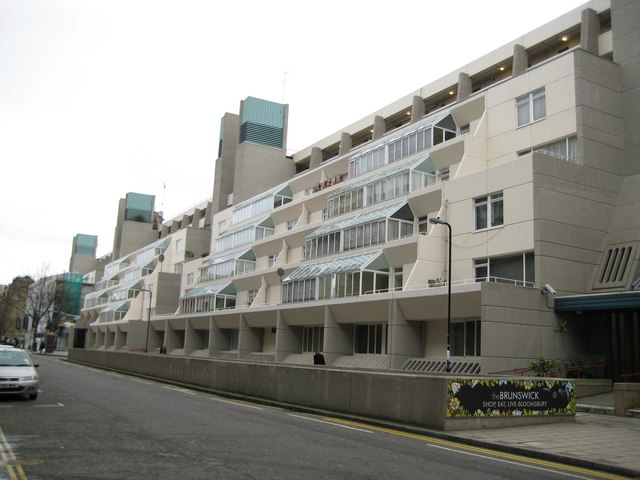
The Brunswick, Bloomsbury, London

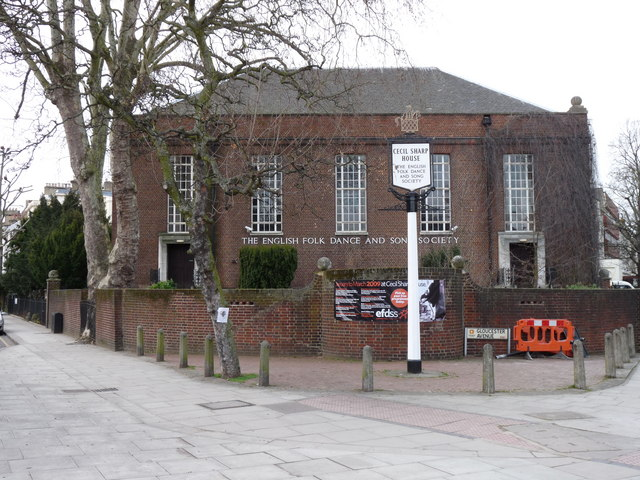
Cecil Sharp House, London

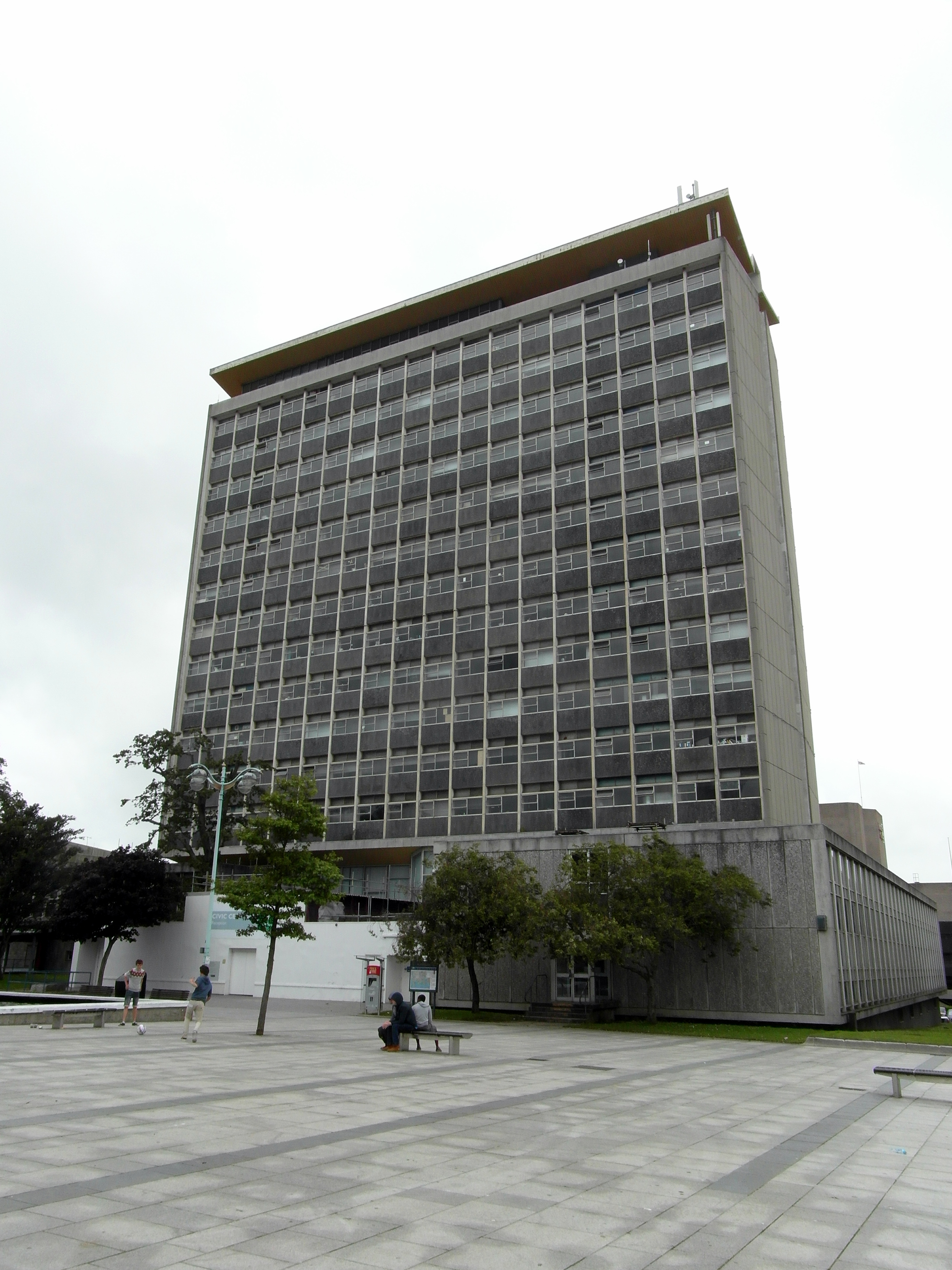
Civic Centre, Plymouth

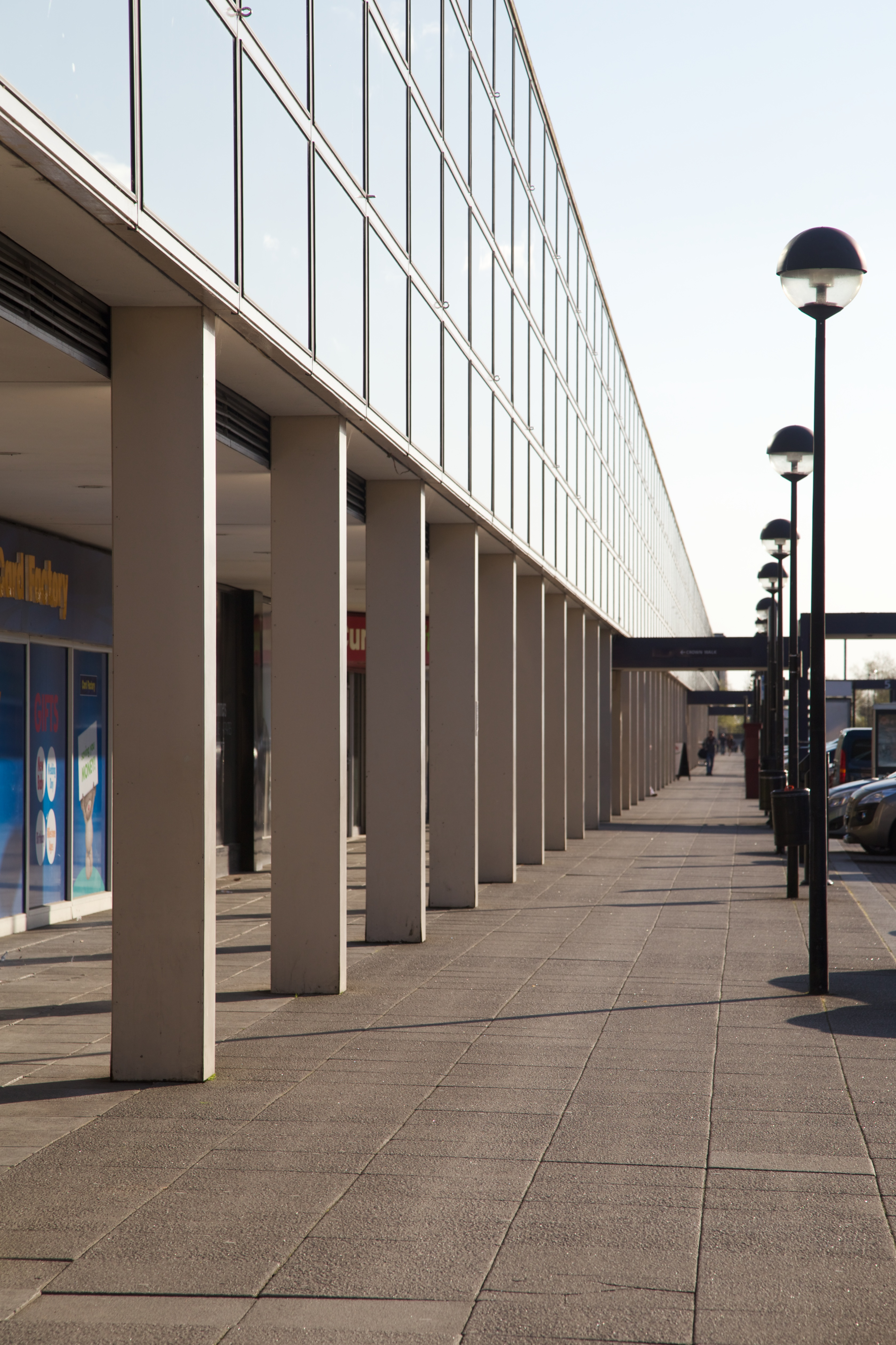
Milton Keynes Shopping Building

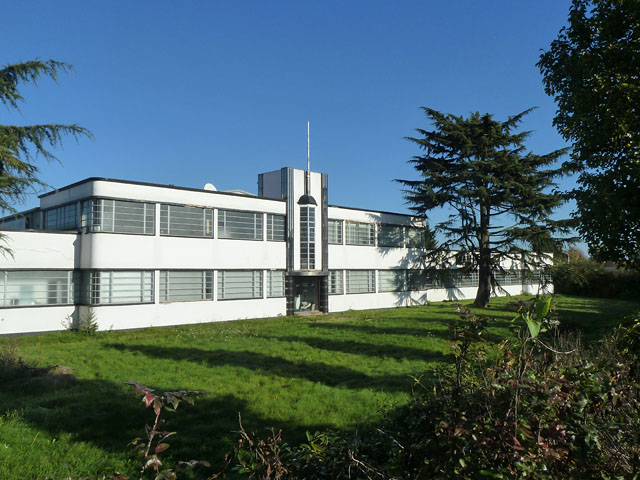
Ripaults Factory, London

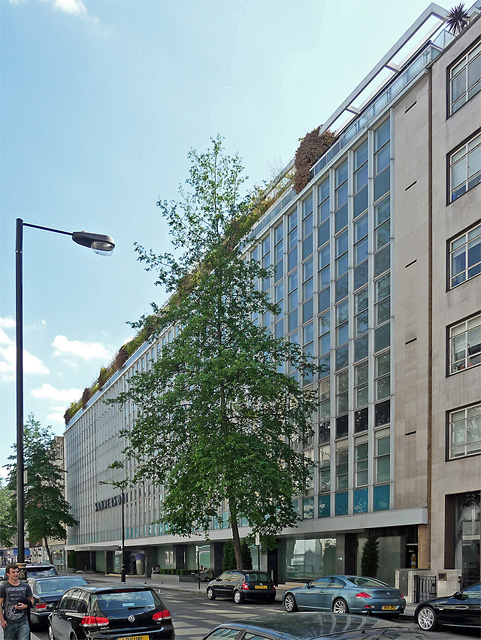
Sanderson Hotel, London

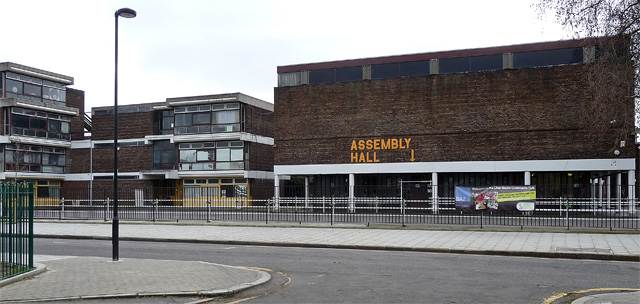
Former Lilian Baylis School, London

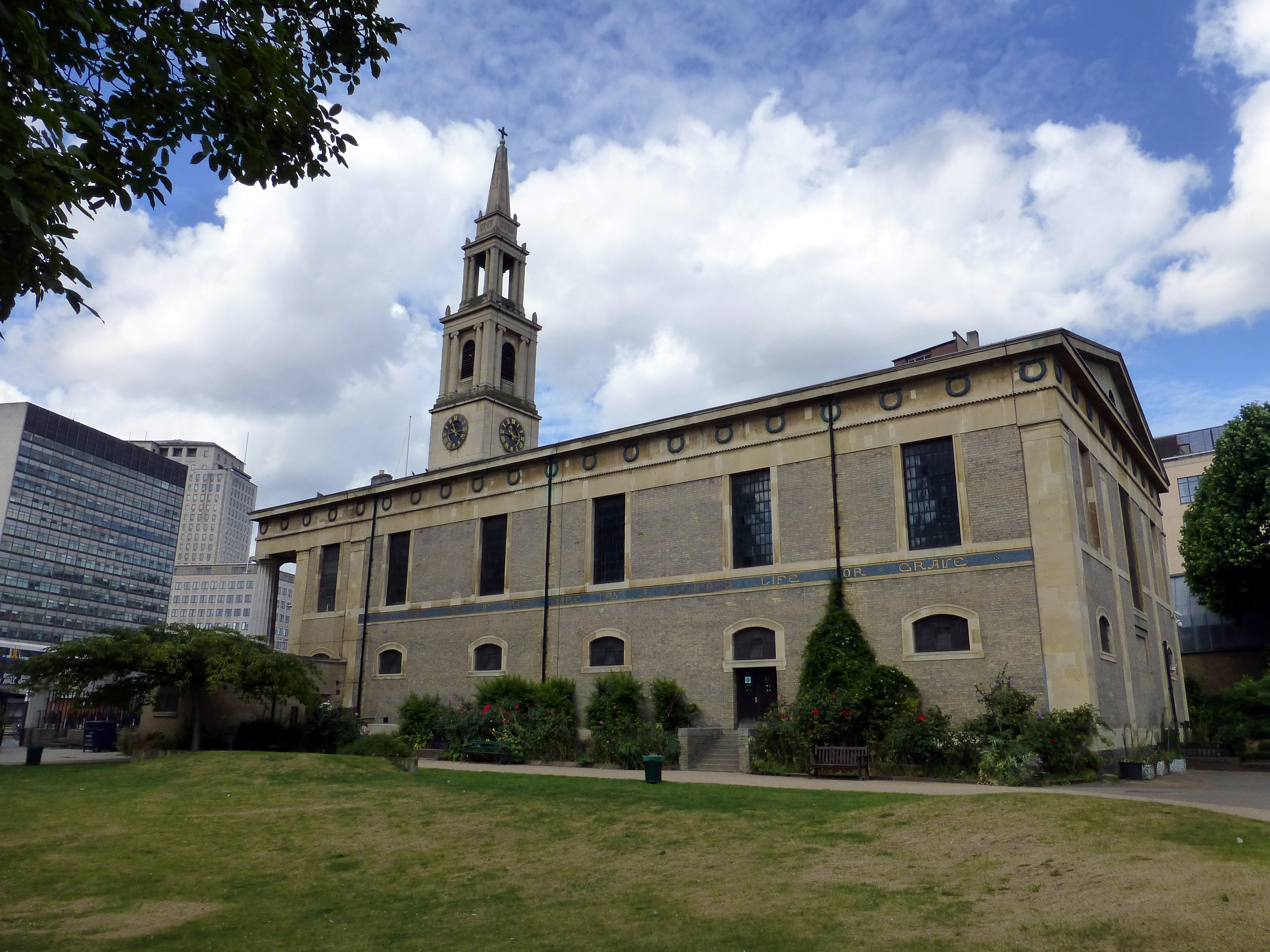
St John's Church, Waterloo, London

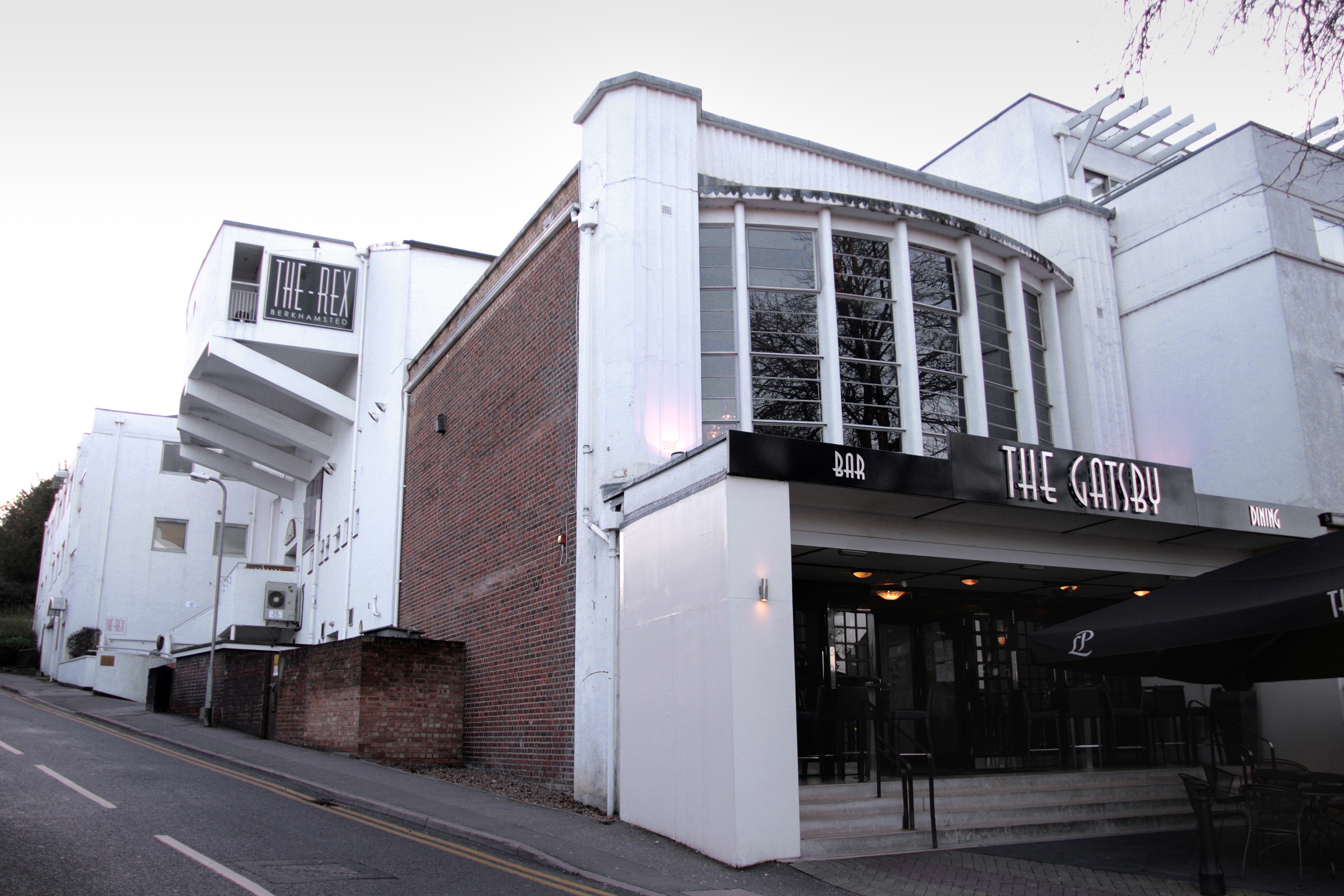
The Rex Cinema, Berkhamsted

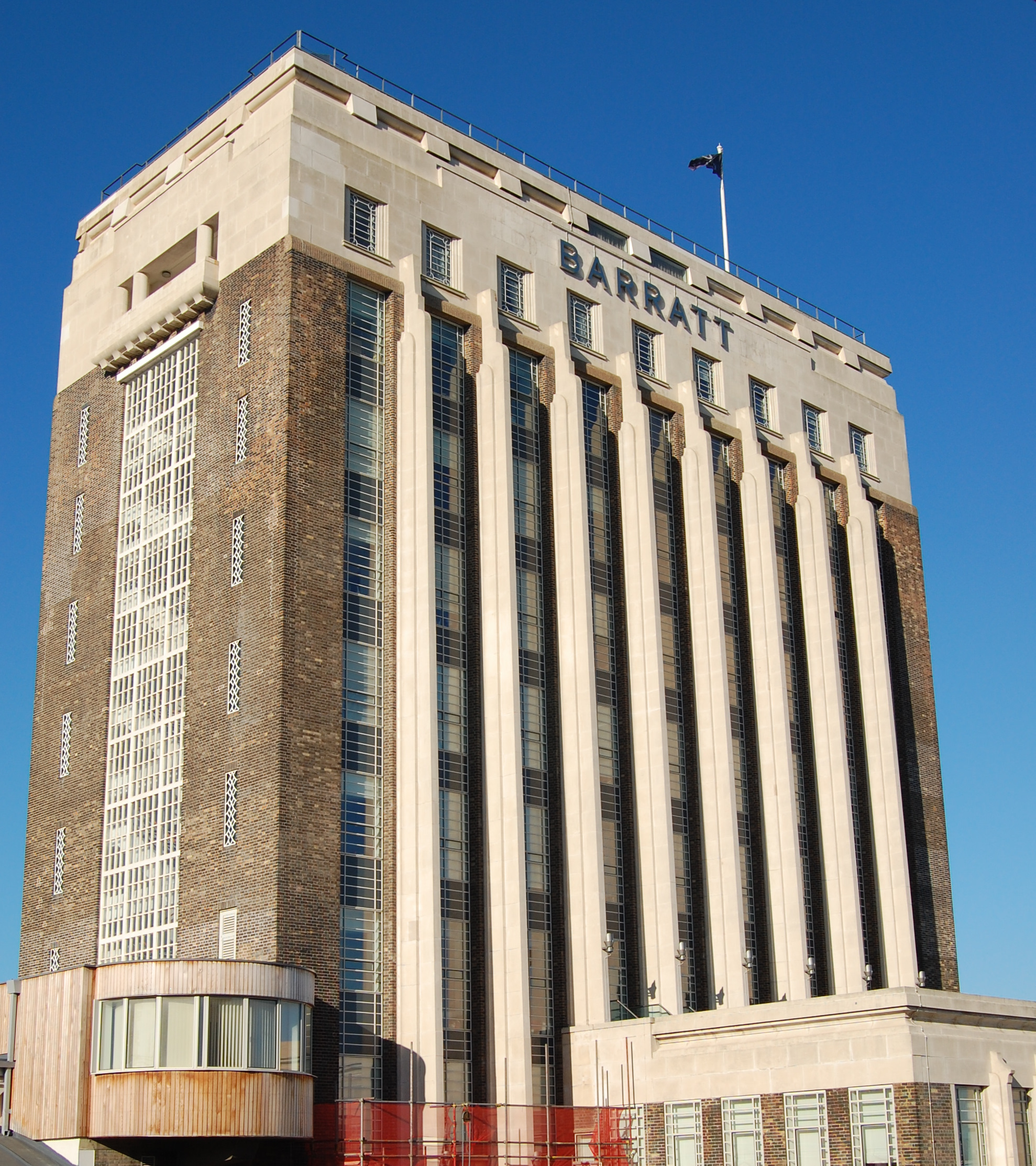
Wallis House, Brentford

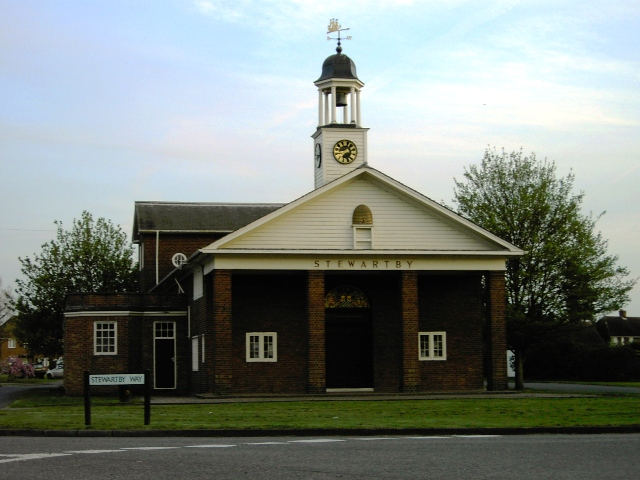
Stewartby Common Room, Bedfordshire

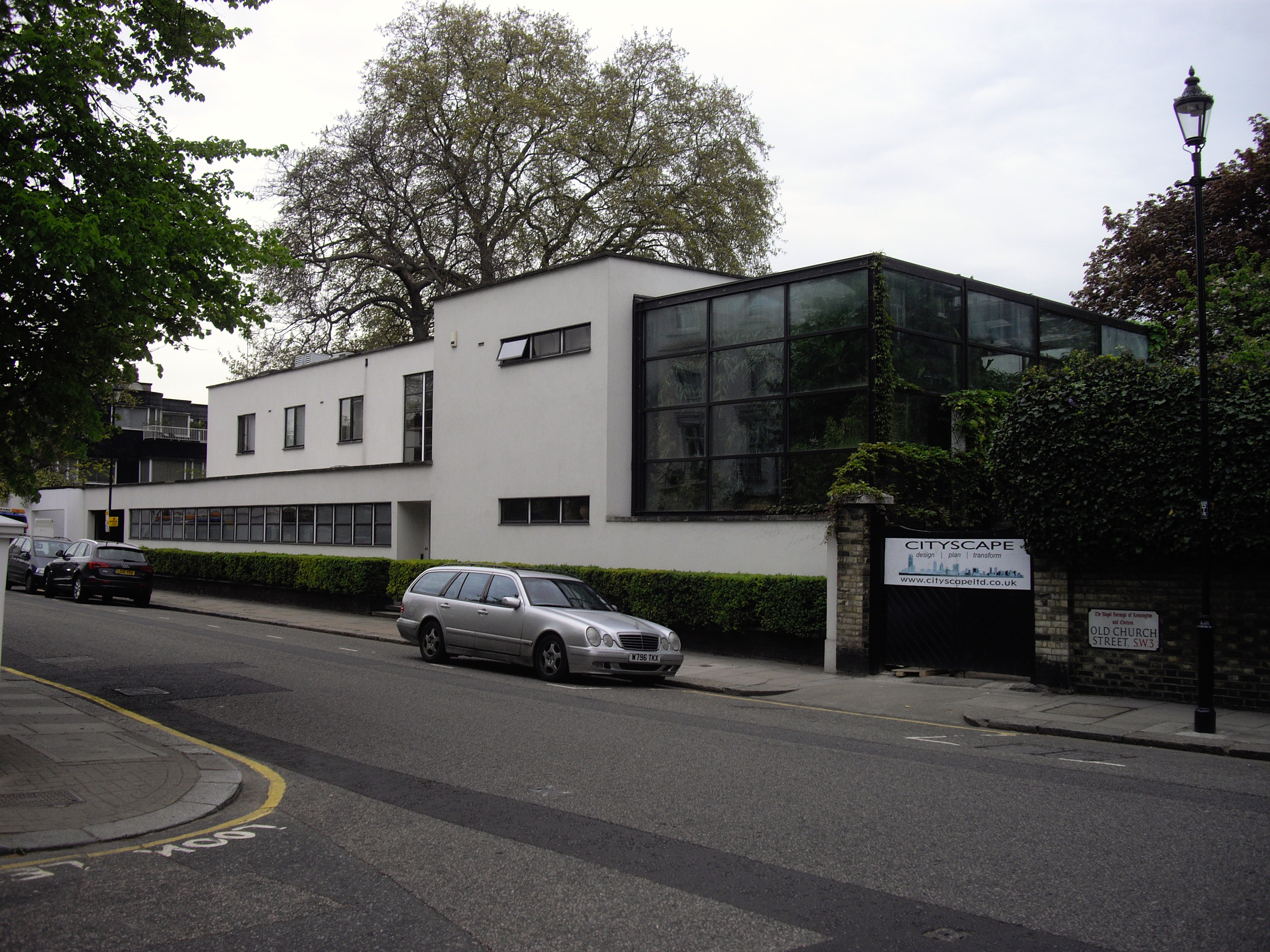
64 Old Church Street, Chelsea

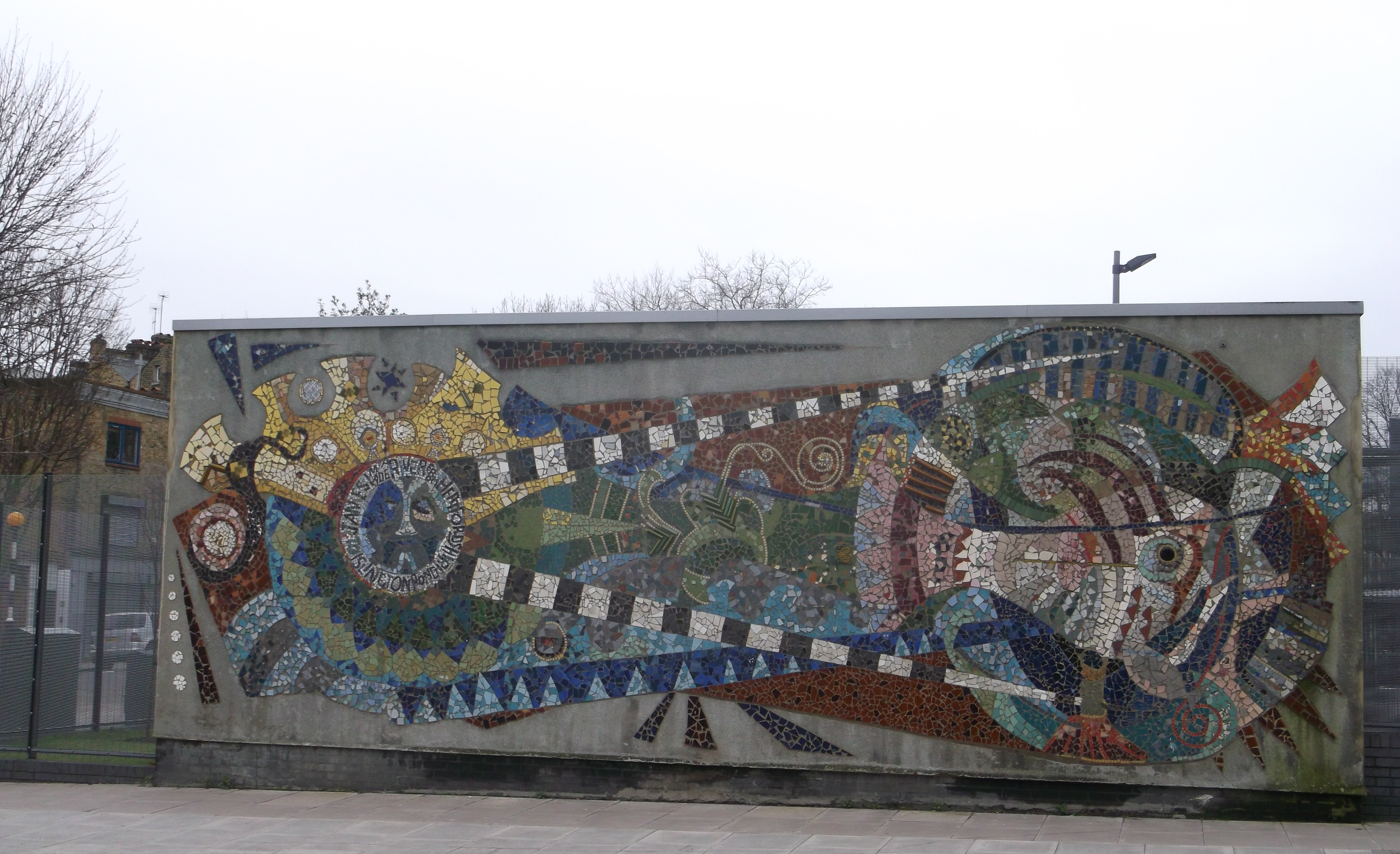
City of London Academy mural, London

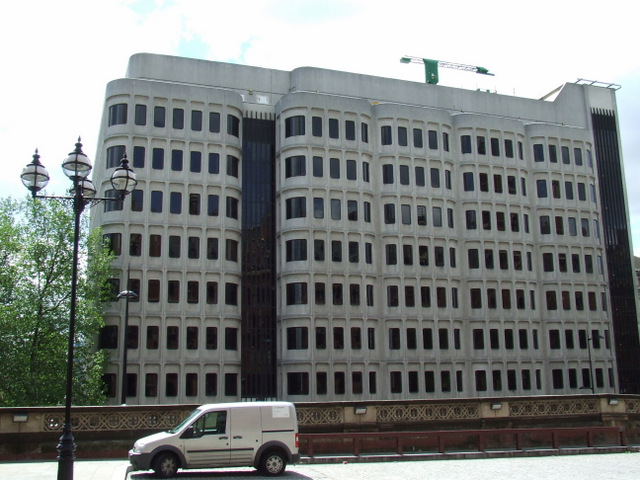
Camden Town Hall extension, London

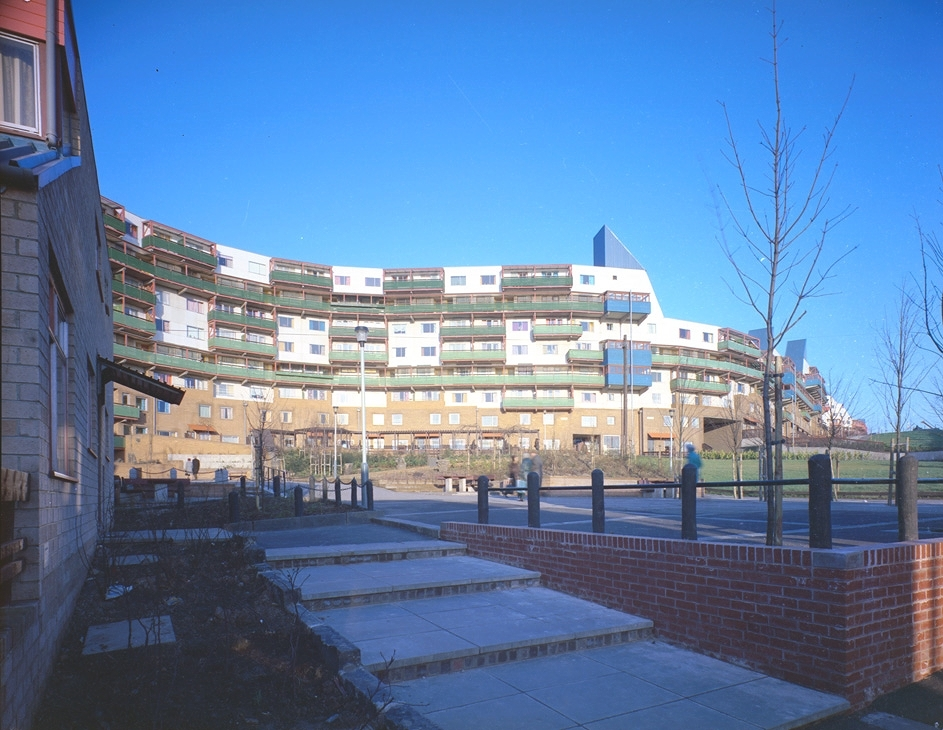
Byker Estate, Newcastle

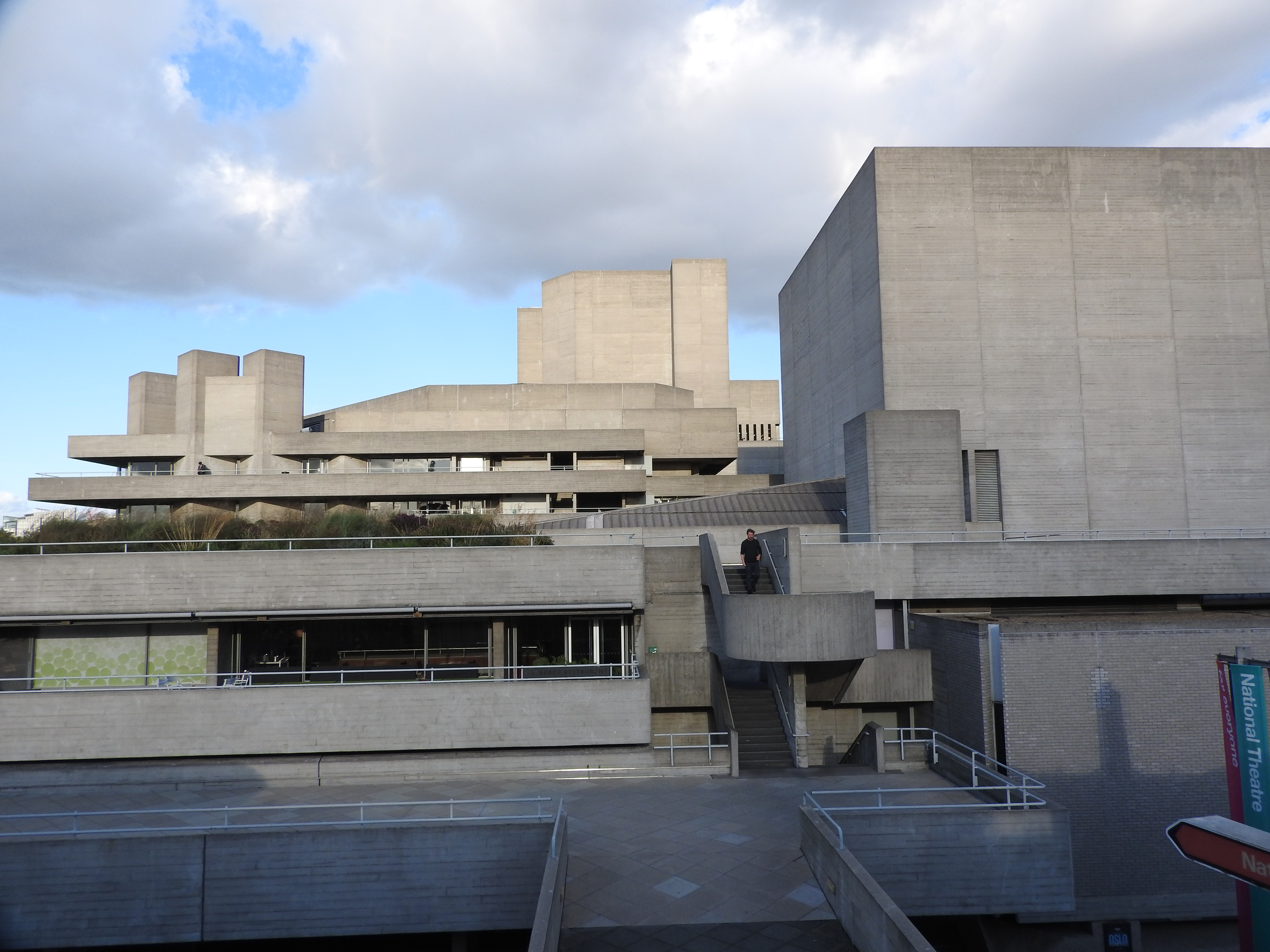
Hayward Gallery and Queen Elizabeth Hall, London

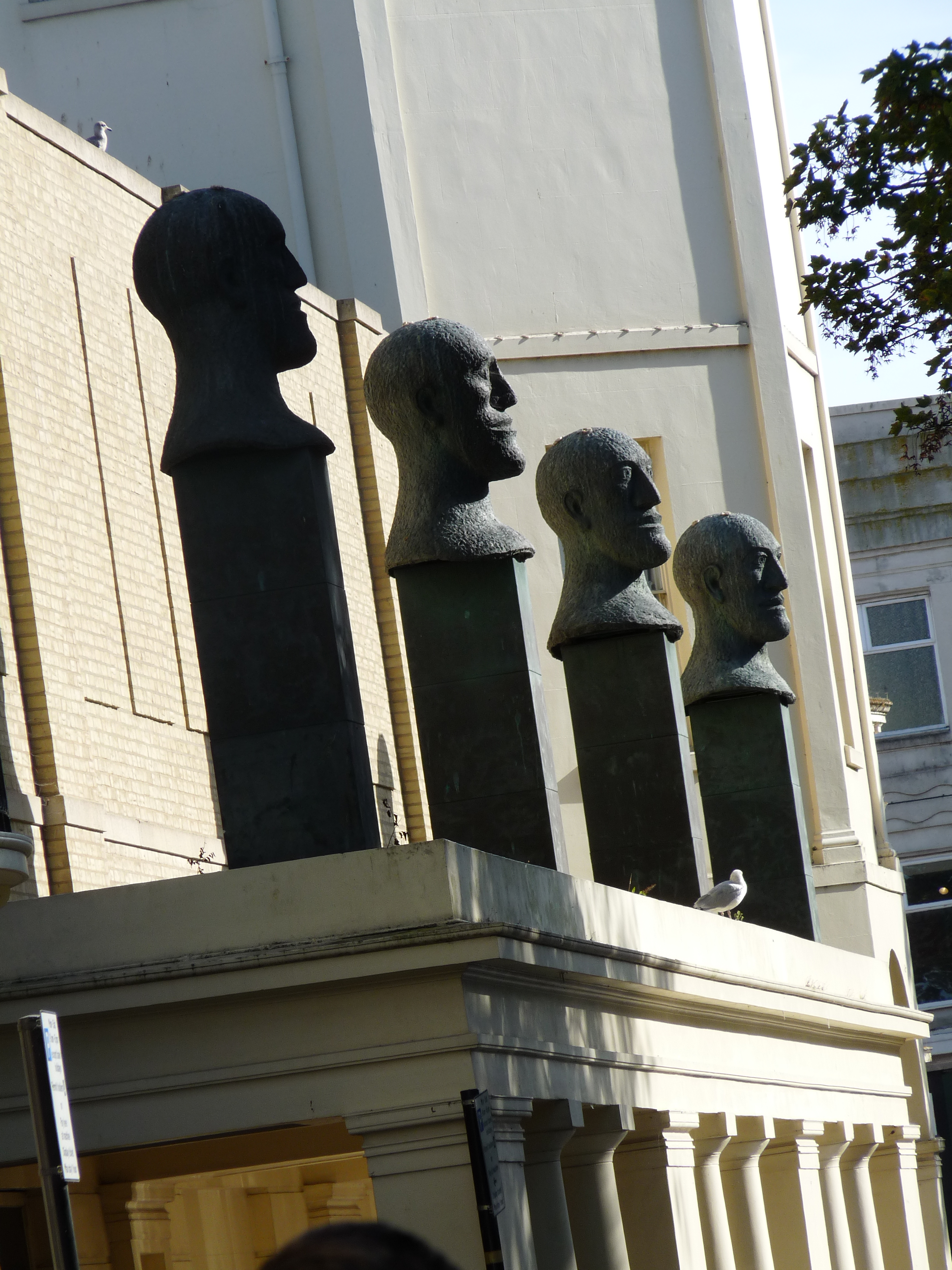
Desert Quartet sculptures, Worthing

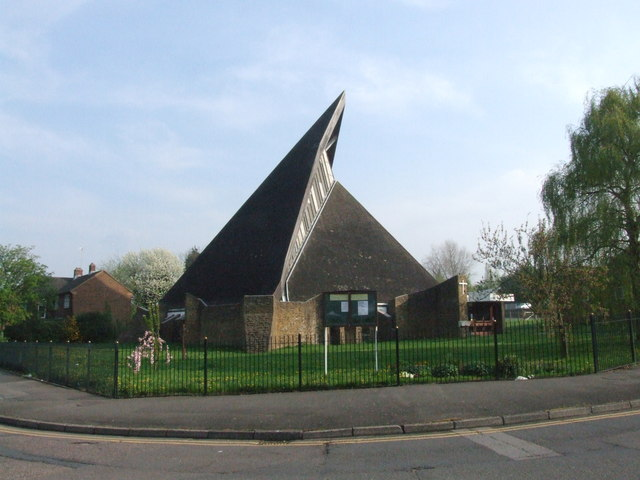
Holy Trinity Church, Gillingham

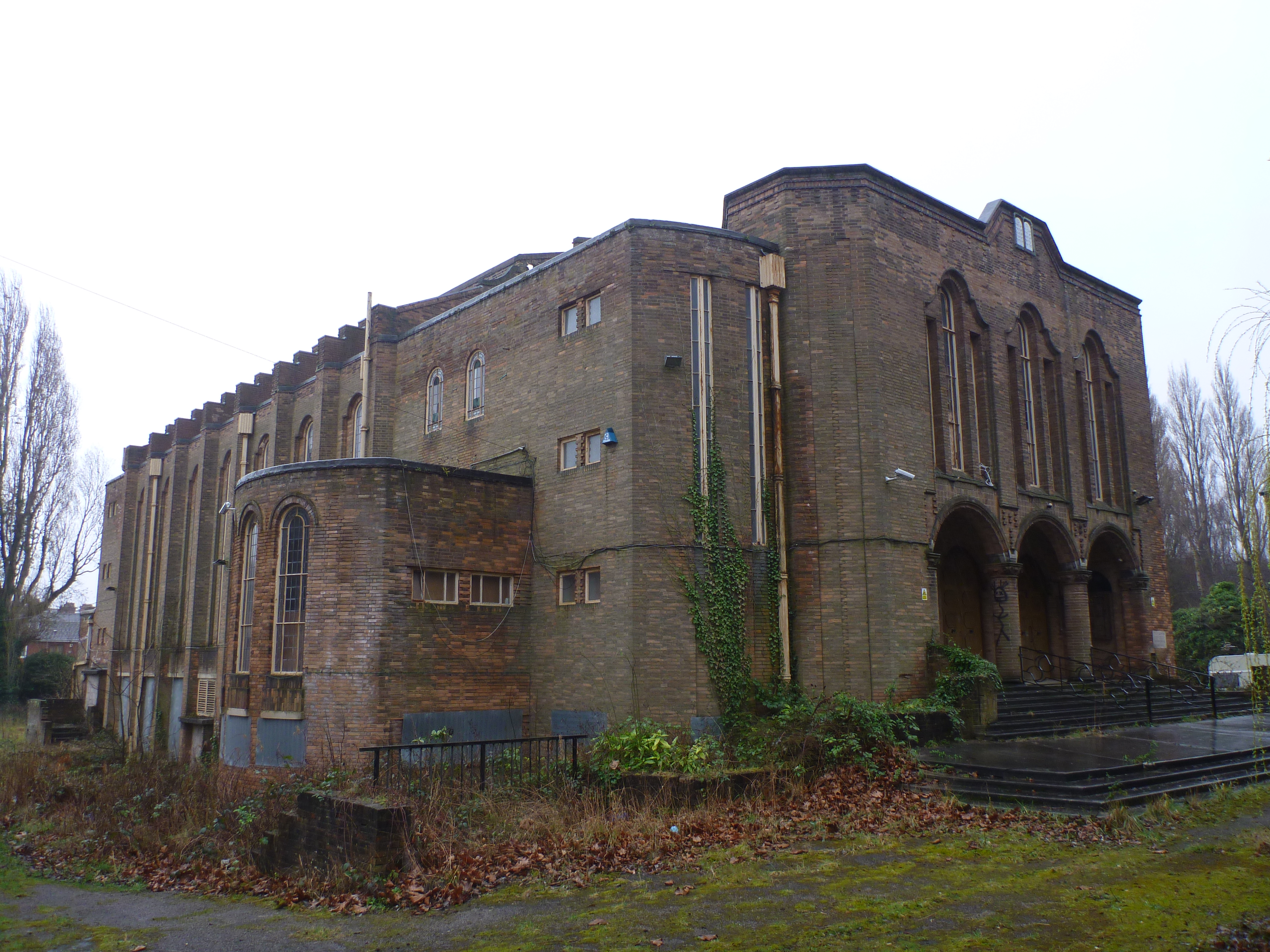
Greenbank Drive Synagogue, Liverpool

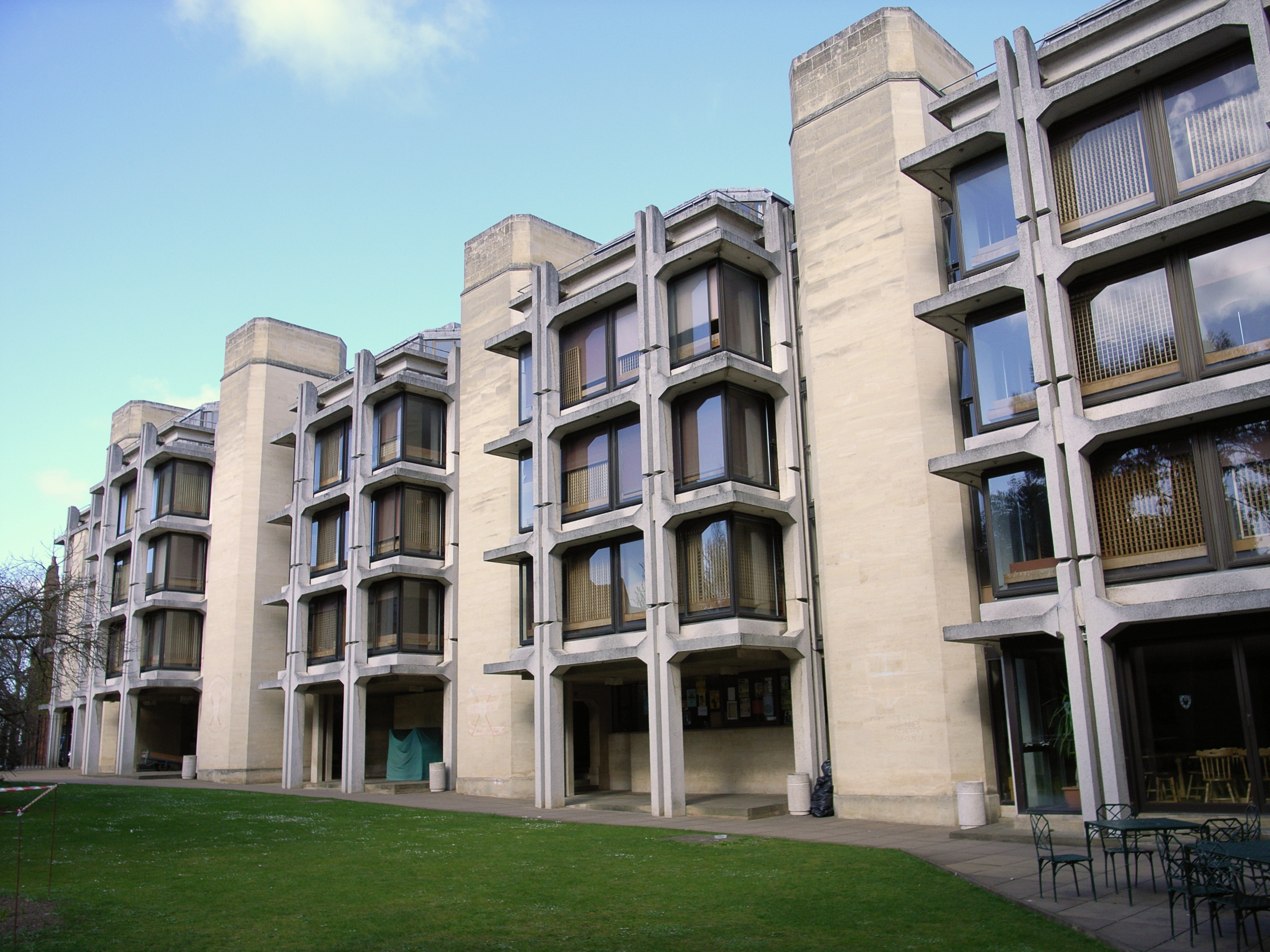
Sir Thomas White building, Oxford

== Publications ==
=== Journal ===
The society published a journal between 1981 and 2018; initially entitled The Thirties Society Journal it became Twentieth Century Architecture from 1994.

=== Books ===
The following books were published by C20, unless otherwise stated:

- Art Deco (1994)
- Interiors and Decorative Art in Britain 1920–1940 (1994)
- The Modern House to 1939 (1994)
- Small Houses 1920–1940 (1994)
- The Heroic Period of Conservation (2004) Ed. Alan Powers, Elain Harwood ISBN 978-0952975571
- British Modern: Architecture and Design in the 1930s (2007) Ed. Alan Powers, Elain Harwood, Susannah Charlton ISBN 978-0952975588
- Housing the Twentieth Century Nation (2008) ISBN 978-0955668708
- McMorran & Whitby: Twentieth Century Architects (2009) Edward Denison, Twentieth Century Society. Pub. RIBA Publishing ISBN 978-1859463208
- The Seventies: Rediscovering a Lost Decade (2012) Ed. Alan Powers, Elain Harwood ISBN 978-0955668722
- Twentieth Century Architecture: Oxford and Cambridge (Vol 11) (2013) Elain Harwood ISBN 9780955668739
- 100 Buildings, 100 Years: Celebrating British Architecture (2014) Pub. Batsford ISBN 978-1849941938
- 50 Architects, 50 Buildings: The Buildings that Inspire Architects (2016) Ed. Pamela Buxton ISBN 9781849943420
- 100 Houses 100 Years (2018) Pub. Batsford ISBN 978-1849944373
- The Architecture of Public Service (2018) Ed. Elain Harwood, Alan Powers ISBN 978-0955668753
- 100 Churches 100 Years (2019) Ed. Clare Price, Elain Harwood, Susannah Charlton. Pub. Batsford ISBN 978-1849945141
- 100 20th-Century Gardens and Landscapes (2020) ISBN 978-1849945295
- 100 20th Century Houses (2022) Pub. Batsford ISBN 978-1849947862
- 100 Twentieth Century Shops (2023) Pub. Pavilion Books ISBN 978-1849947701
