= Myatt's Fields South Estate =

Housing estate in south London

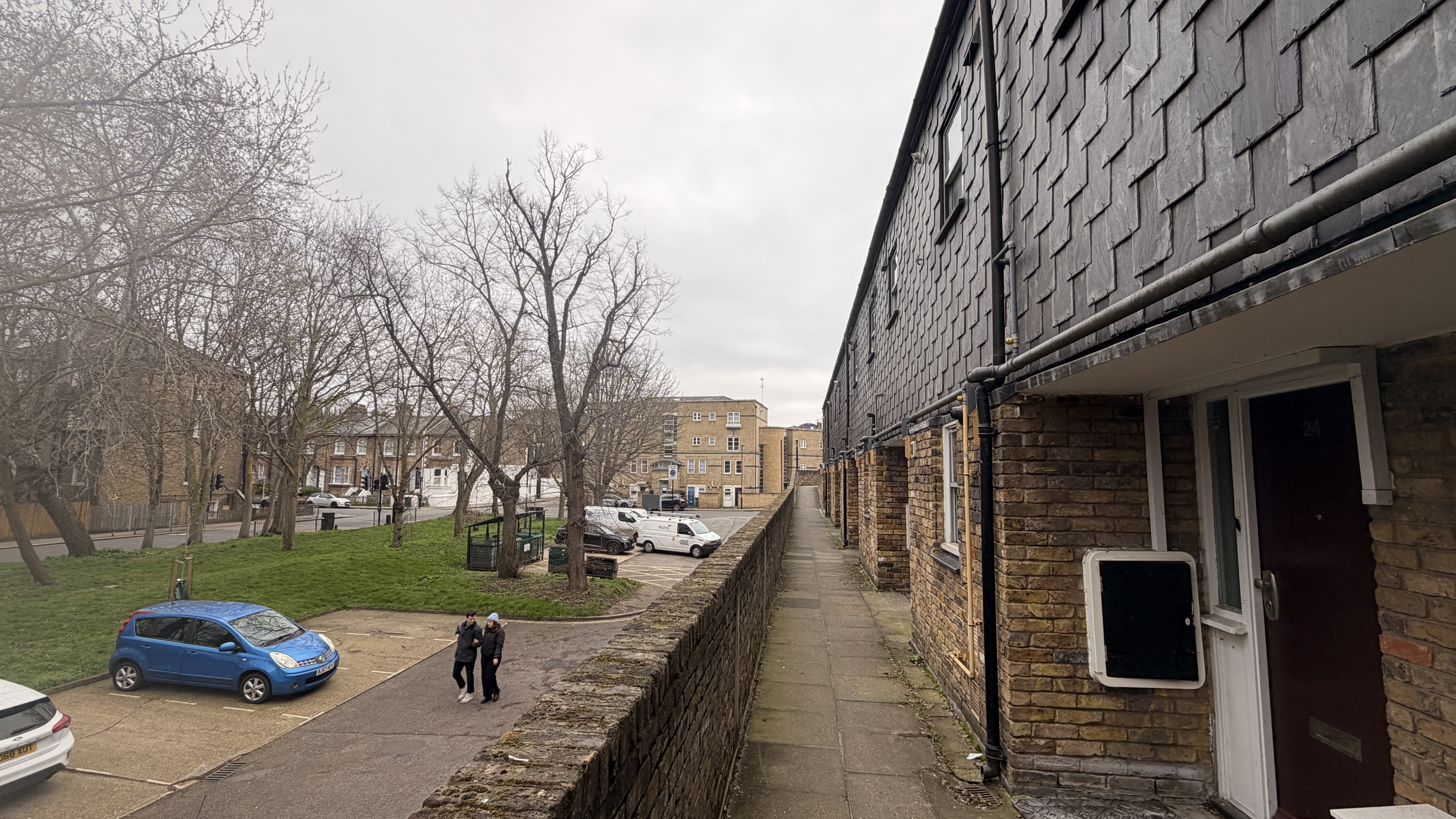
- Myatt's Fields South Estate
- Interactive map of Myatt's Fields South Estate

General information
- Location: Myatt's Fields South, Lambeth, London
- Coordinates: 51.471528°N 0.110015°W
- Area: 11.20 acres (4.53 ha)
- No. of units: 354

Construction
- Architect: Ted Hollamby, Roger Westman
- Authority: London Borough of Lambeth

Myatt's Fields South is a social housing estate located between Brixton Road and Camberwell New Road in South London. It is on land that once formed part of the Lambeth Wick estate.

Myatt's Fields North and South estates were built between 1970 and 1984 with 470 homes on the North and 324 on the South.

In recent years it has been the subject of a dispute between residents and Lambeth Council, who have tried to replace the boiler system that serves Myatt's Field South, and Myatt's Field North estate, which has since been redeveloped as Oval Quarter.

== History ==
The area to the West of Myatt's Fields Park suffered considerable bomb damage during the Second World War, with the area of Mostyn road being extensively damaged and a V2 rocket levelling buildings on Lothian Road where it meets Calais Street.

The estate was designed by Lambeth Council by a team of architects led by Roger Westman and Ted Hollamby. Hollamby had been employed as senior architect at the London County Council from 1949 to 1962, where he led the design of the Brandon Estate in Kennington. He then left to work at London borough of Lambeth, where he was director of architecture, planning and development from 1969 to 1981, and for whom he designed Myatt's Fields South and North. Hollamby also designed Cressingham Gardens and Central Hill Estate, both of which are currently proposed for redevelopment.

== Description ==
The estate is built of slate and brick blocks over parking undercrofts. It is formed of 354 dwellings, including 8 designed for severely disabled people, and 15 refurbished Victorian houses on Loughborough Road. The new build houses cater for a mixture of housing types, with a ring of apartments above garages at the perimeter of the estate, and town houses and terraces arranged around pedestrian footpaths inside. These are a maximum of 3 storeys high, with living rooms and bedrooms facing away from the noise of the surrounding roads. The green spaces within the estate were intended to form part of a "parkway" of public open space parallel to Brixton Road.

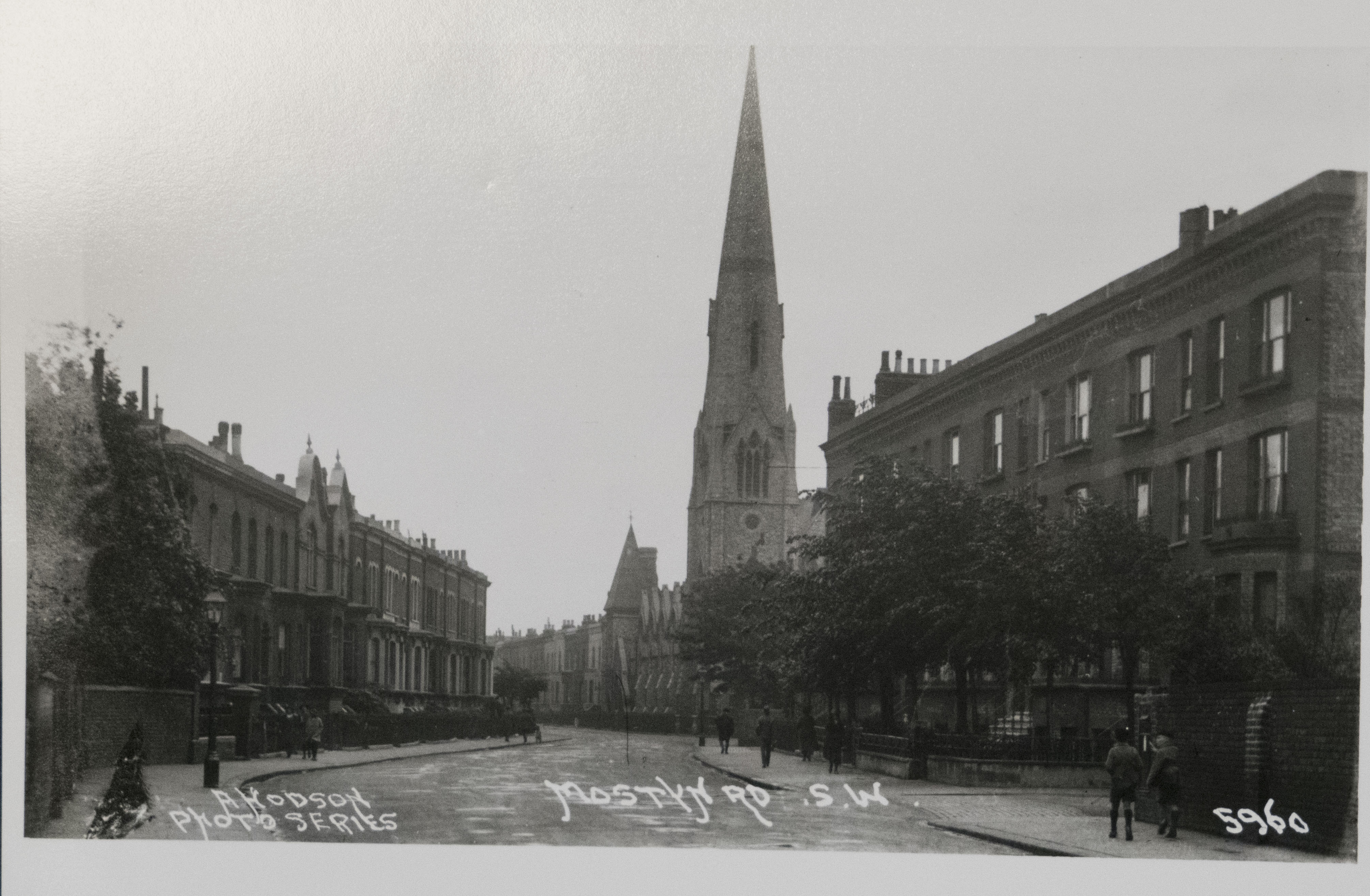
Church on Mostyn Road prior to the construction of the estate.

Ted Hollamby contracted Edmund Happold from Ove Arup & Partners to advise on structural engineering, contributing to the development of Central Hill estate, West Norwood Library and the subterranean boiler house at Myatt's Fields which was designed to heat both North and South Myatt's Fields estates. The boiler house has a design that led to it being called 'HMS Hollamby', and more recently, 'The Submarine'. The North part of Myatt's Fields estate was redeveloped in 2013–15, as its design was believed to contribute to anti-social behaviour, and the garage space was underused as a result of car ownership being less than predicted in the 1970s.

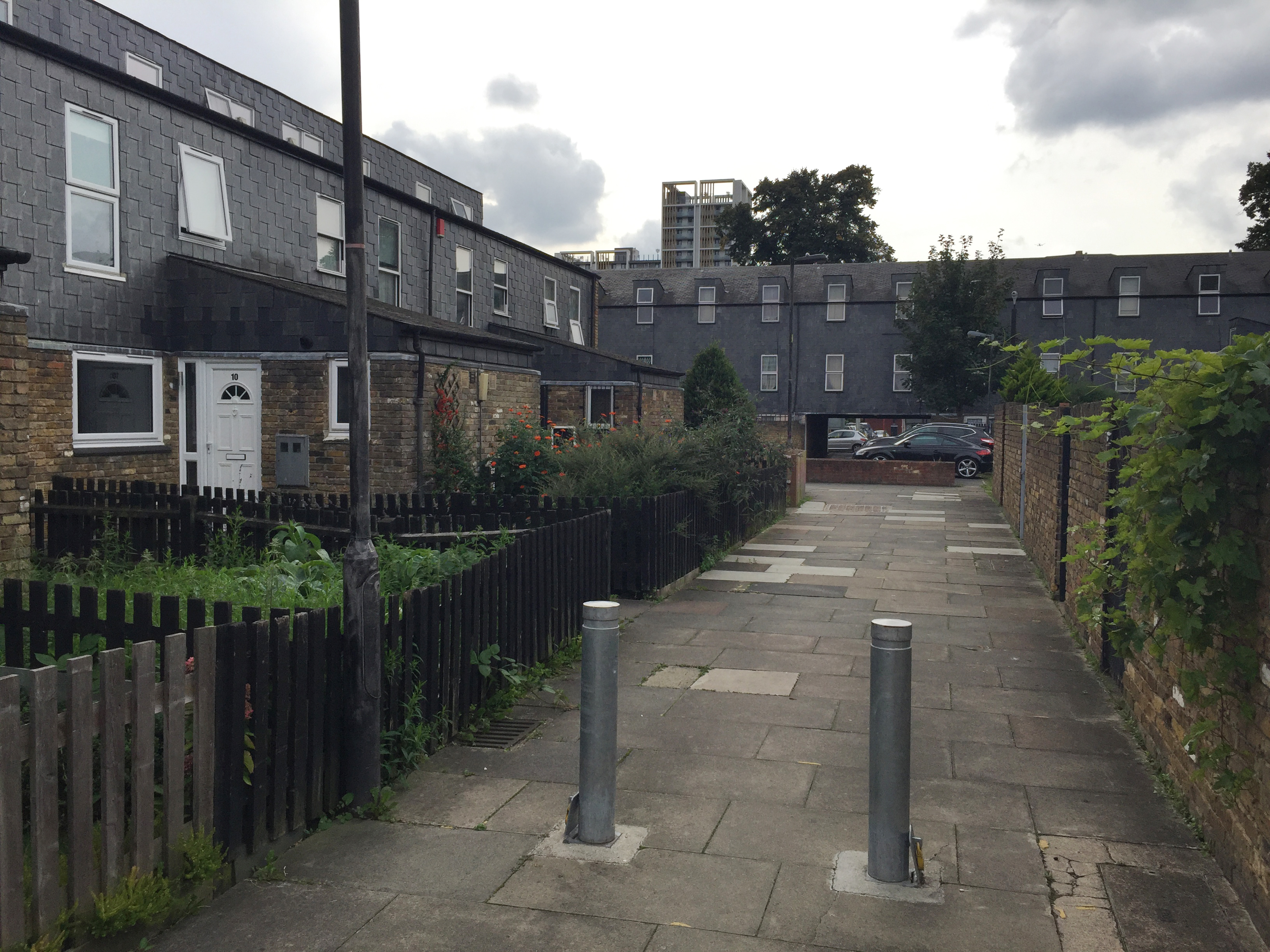
Interior of Myatt's Fields South Estate

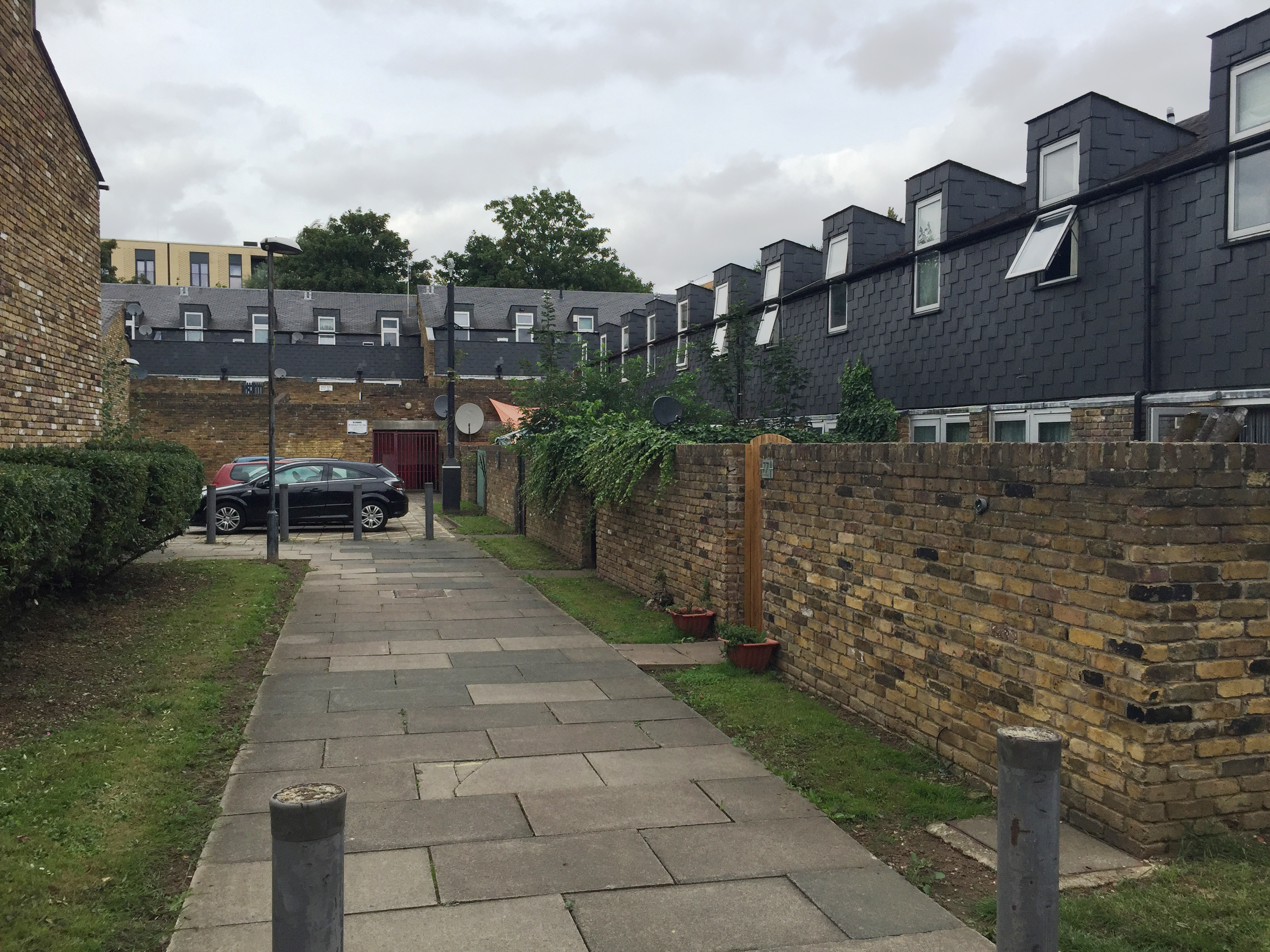
Interior of Myatt's Fields South Estate

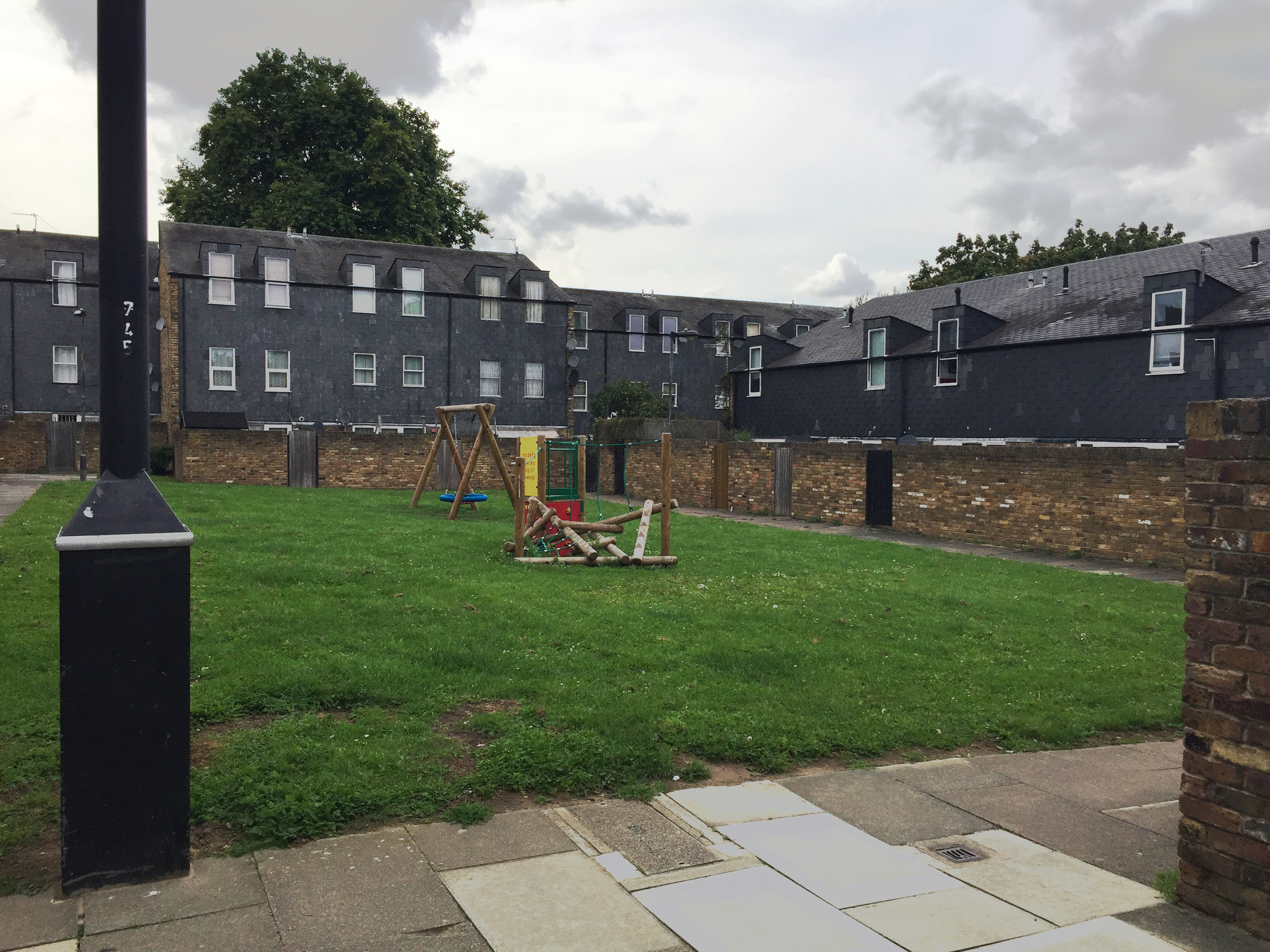
Interior of Myatt's Fields South Estate

== See also ==
- Myatt's Fields Park
