= Gipsy Hill =

Area of south London

Coordinates: 51.4245°N 0.0840°W

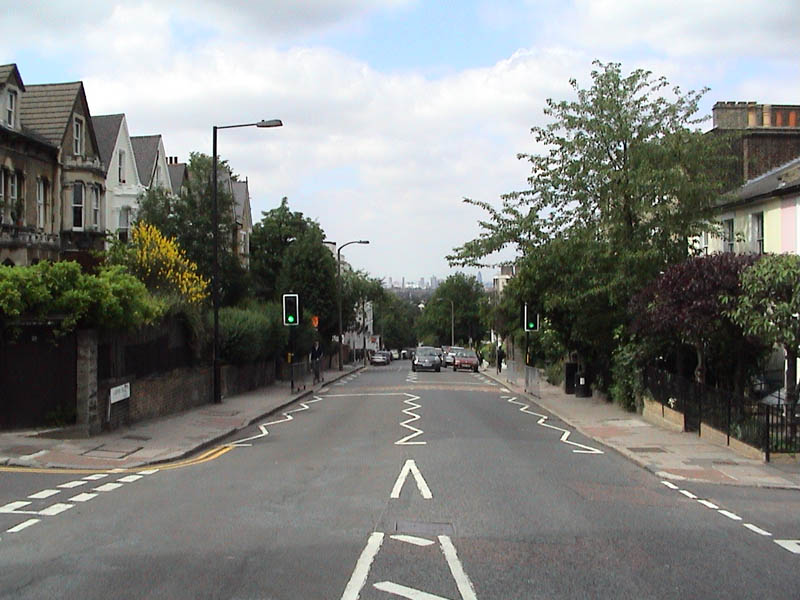
- View down the upper straight of the street, Gipsy Hill, looking north towards the City of London

- Location within Greater London
- Population: 13,712 (2011 Census. Ward)
- OS grid reference: TQ332710
- London borough: Lambeth
- Ceremonial county: Greater London
- Region: London
- Country: England
- Sovereign state: United Kingdom
- Post town: LONDON
- Postcode district: SE19, SE27
- Dialling code: 020 (8670 OR 8761)
- Police: Metropolitan
- Fire: London
- Ambulance: London
- UK Parliament: Dulwich and West Norwood
- London Assembly: Lambeth and Southwark

Gipsy Hill in south London is a hilly neighbourhood spanning the southern parts of the London Boroughs of Lambeth and Southwark. It is known for its views of Dulwich and the City of London.

Historically, north of its traditional Westow–Central Hill southern limit, it was split between the southern projections of the West Norwood daughter parish of Lambeth and the St Giles church daughter parish of Camberwell in Surrey, until urban reforms in 1889 created the County of London. It takes in, due to a diagonal, slightly weaving border, somewhat less of the London Borough of Southwark, and it has a ridge-top border along the retail/services/leisure street Westow Hill and residential street Central Hill with Upper Norwood in the London Borough of Croydon.

== History and geography ==
Gipsy Hill is the name of the central road that runs south upwards from Gipsy Road, where it becomes Alleyn Park near the southern end of Croxted Road, up to Central Hill and Westow Hill (a brief eastern continuation in the Crystal Palace Triangle). The latter are two crest-top roads marking the limit of Upper Norwood, part of the London Borough (and, here, former parish) of Croydon. Due to its station, as common across London, the name has been taken to extend to encompass a wider, in this case, upper hill-side zone in extreme projections of the two relevant boroughs.

The district takes its name from the presence of Gypsies in what was, until the 19th century, a sparsely populated rural area. On 11 August 1668, Samuel Pepys recorded in his diary that his wife had visited "the gypsies at Lambeth"; Keats also wrote about the Norwood gypsies.

The hill and particularly its southern climactic ridge are part of a much larger formation, the Norwood Ridge.

The area rapidly developed after Gipsy Hill railway station was opened in 1856: at first large private houses were constructed (most of which are now subdivided), then in the mid-20th century blocks of council housing were built, a little of which remains as social housing. An 18-room nuclear bunker was constructed between 1963 and 1966 as part of a block of flats on the Central Hill Estate called Pear Tree House on Lunham Road.

== Politics ==
Gipsy Hill ward is represented by three elected members of Lambeth Borough Council; for fair apportionment it extends into West Norwood and West Dulwich. Gipsy Hill is also considered to extend into Dulwich Wood (ward) under Southwark Council in the east.

== Buildings and facilities ==
The Central Hill Estate was built in the 1960s and 1970s, and designed by Rosemary Stjernstedt, Roger Westman and the Lambeth Council planning department during the directorship of Ted Hollamby. Two independent companies brew beer commercially: the Gipsy Hill Brewing Co. and the London Beer Factory.

=== Police ===
Gipsy Hill Police Station was on the A214, Central Hill, the western continuation of Westow Hill. It was London's highest station: an old Bench Mark SW, opposite, stated 360.6 feet (109.9 m) Above Ordnance Datum.

== Schools ==
- Elm Wood Primary School, Carnac Street.
- Kingswood Primary School, Gipsy Road (on two sites).
- Park Campus Academy, Gipsy Road.
- Paxton Primary School, Woodland Road.

Elm Wood, Kingswood and Paxton schools are all members of The Gipsy Hill Federation.

The nearest private school is in West Dulwich.

== Churches ==
The following congregations meet in buildings that are readily identified as places of worship:

- Berridge Road Community Church (Anglican), Berridge Road, SE19 1EF
- Christ Church, Gipsy Hill (Anglican), 1b Highland Road SE19 1DP
- Kingdom Hall of Jehovah's Witnesses, Whiteley Road, SE19 1JT
- Upper Norwood Methodist Church, Westow Hill, SE19 1TQ

These buildings were constructed as places of worship but are now used for other purposes:

- Former Gipsy Hill Wesleyan Chapel; converted into flats.
- Former Gipsy Road Baptist Church; upper part: housing conversion; ground floor: nursery.
- The tower of Christ Church, Gipsy Hill; converted in to a house following a fire in the nineteen-eighties.

== Nearest places ==
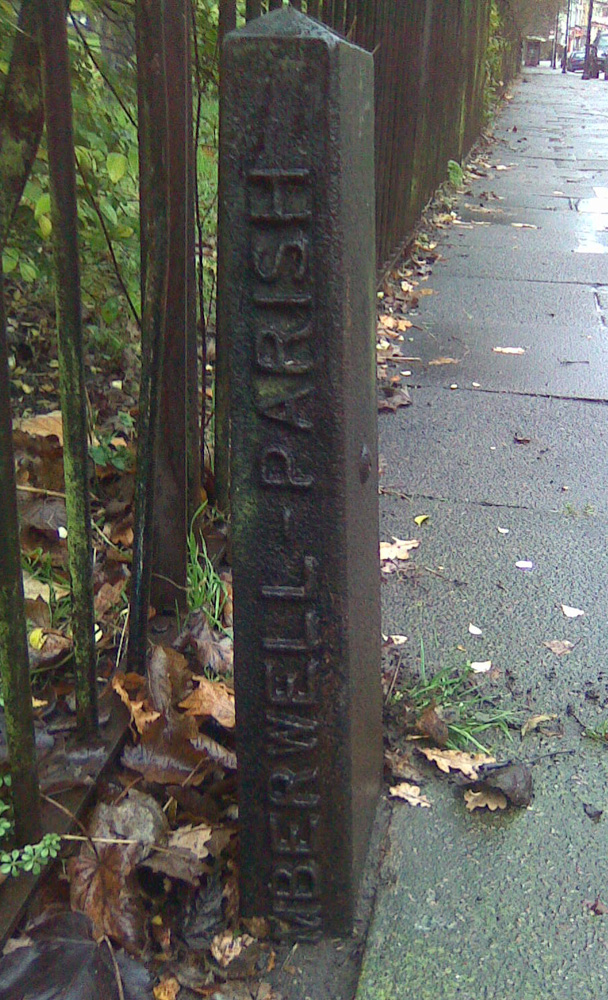
a rarely surviving boundary marker for Camberwell/Lambeth parishes along the eastern branch of the Effra at Gipsy Hill is now a little buried by pavement

- Crystal Palace
- Dulwich Wood
- Herne Hill
- Sydenham
- Upper Norwood
- West Dulwich
- West Norwood

== Nearest stations ==
- Crystal Palace railway station
- Gipsy Hill railway station
- West Norwood railway station
- Sydenham Hill railway station

== Notable residents ==
- Troy Southgate, the writer and musician, lived beside the church as a child.
- Errol Brown of Hot Chocolate, lived in Alexandra Drive, Gipsy Hill
- Daniel Kitson, comedian, known for Phoenix Nights
- Kate Thornton, former presenter of The X Factor
- Nathaniel Chalobah, Watford football player
- Trevoh Chalobah, Chelsea football player
- Krept & Konan, rappers
- Isy Suttie, actress, radio presenter and comedian
- Elis James, comedian, broadcaster and actor
- Patrick Grant, designer and judge on The Great British Sewing Bee
- Hard Skin, local oi punk band
- Caleb Azumah Nelson, author
- K-Trap, rapper
