= Council garden estate =

Type of housing estate

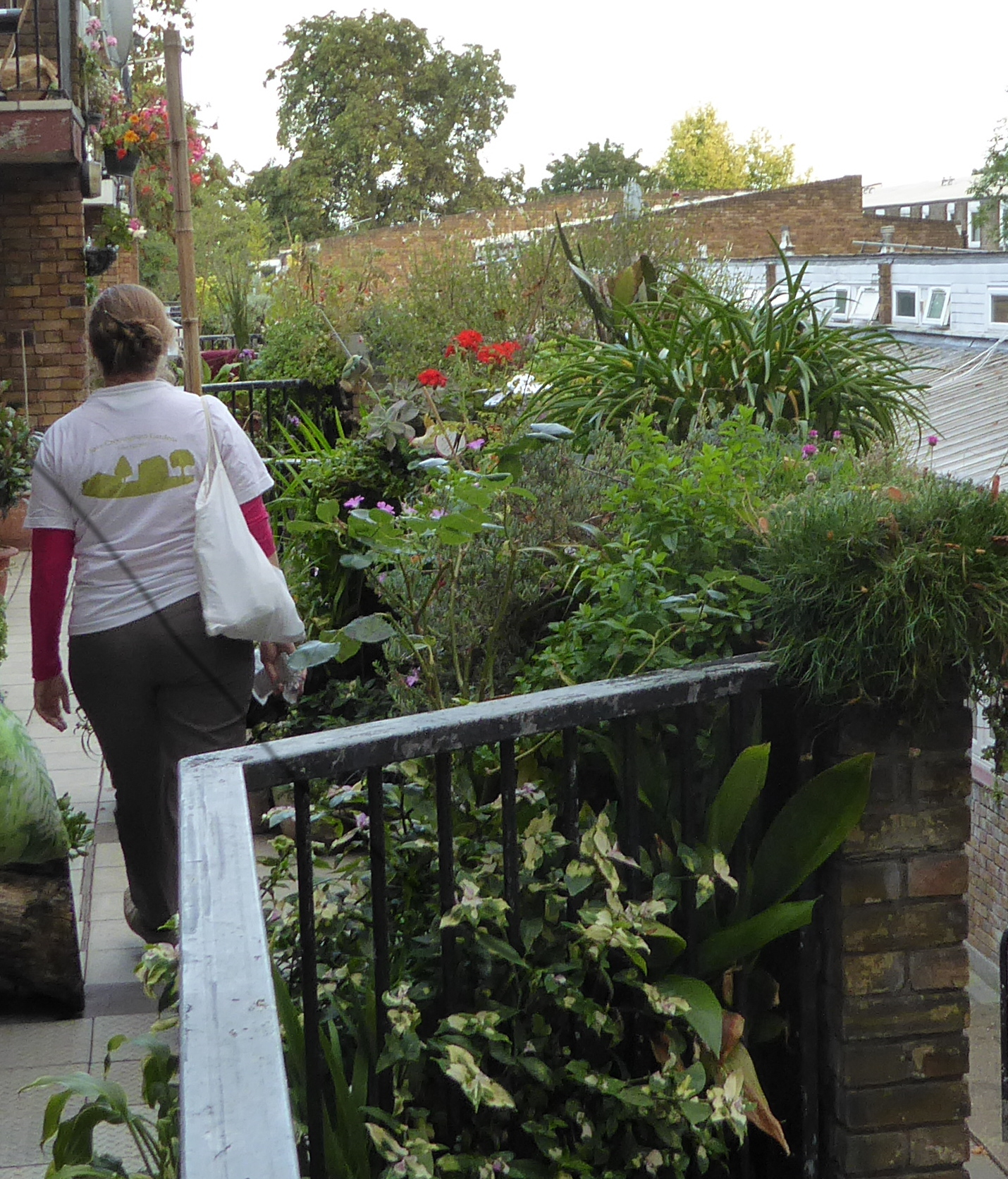
Cressingham Gardens in London, where the tenants maintain the gardens and walkways

A council garden estate is a housing estate planned and built for the rehousing of people from decaying inner city areas, pioneered by Ted Hollamby at Cressingham Gardens, Lambeth, in the 1960s. It was a reaction to the philosophy of Ernő Goldfinger, Lubetkin and Le Corbusier who saw a housing estate as an architectural monument. Hollamby sought an anti- monumental architecture, to design for the wishes and needs of the people. High density (250 persons per ha) was achieved by pedestrianising the estate and having external car-parking
