= Kenneth Westman =

British diplomat, intelligence officer (1907–1964)

- Born: Kenneth Edwin William Branch Westman; 2 February 1907; Glamorgan, Wales
- Died: 30 July 1964 (aged 57); London, UK
- Employer: Foreign Office
- Spouse: Jean Felicia Bedworth
- Children: 3, including Roger, Nicholas Westman and Andrew

Kenneth Edwin William Branch Westman (1907–1964) was a British diplomat and intelligence officer.

== Life ==
Westman was born at Glamorgan, Wales to James and Beatrice (née Branch). He was educated at Cheam and Cowbridge.

Westman entered HM Diplomatic Service in 1929. A year later he was promoted to attaché, shortly after third secretary and later second secretary. His first overseas posting was to Paris, followed by Berlin, Vienna and the Hague. He was involved in British covert operations in Latin America, particularly Bolivia, attempting to strengthen British involvement in the region.

During the Second World War he served as an intelligence officer with the Secret Intelligence Service and SOE, being sent to France, from Madrid, on two occasions.

From 1940 he served as first secretary and later envoy at the British Embassy in Madrid. Maintaining Spanish neutrality was of great strategic importance and the British diplomats in Spain adopted a position of "benevolent neutrality" towards Franco's state.

=== Personal life ===
Westman married Jean Felicia Bedworth, daughter of Bertram James Davenport Bedworth and Edith Emily Dixon. They had issue:

- Roger Ulick Branch Westman (1939-2020), architect
- Nicholas John Westman (b. 1942), engineer, urbanist
- Kenneth Andrew Rodney Westman (b. 1948), archaeologist
