= Tony Hollaway =

British craftsman (1928–2000)

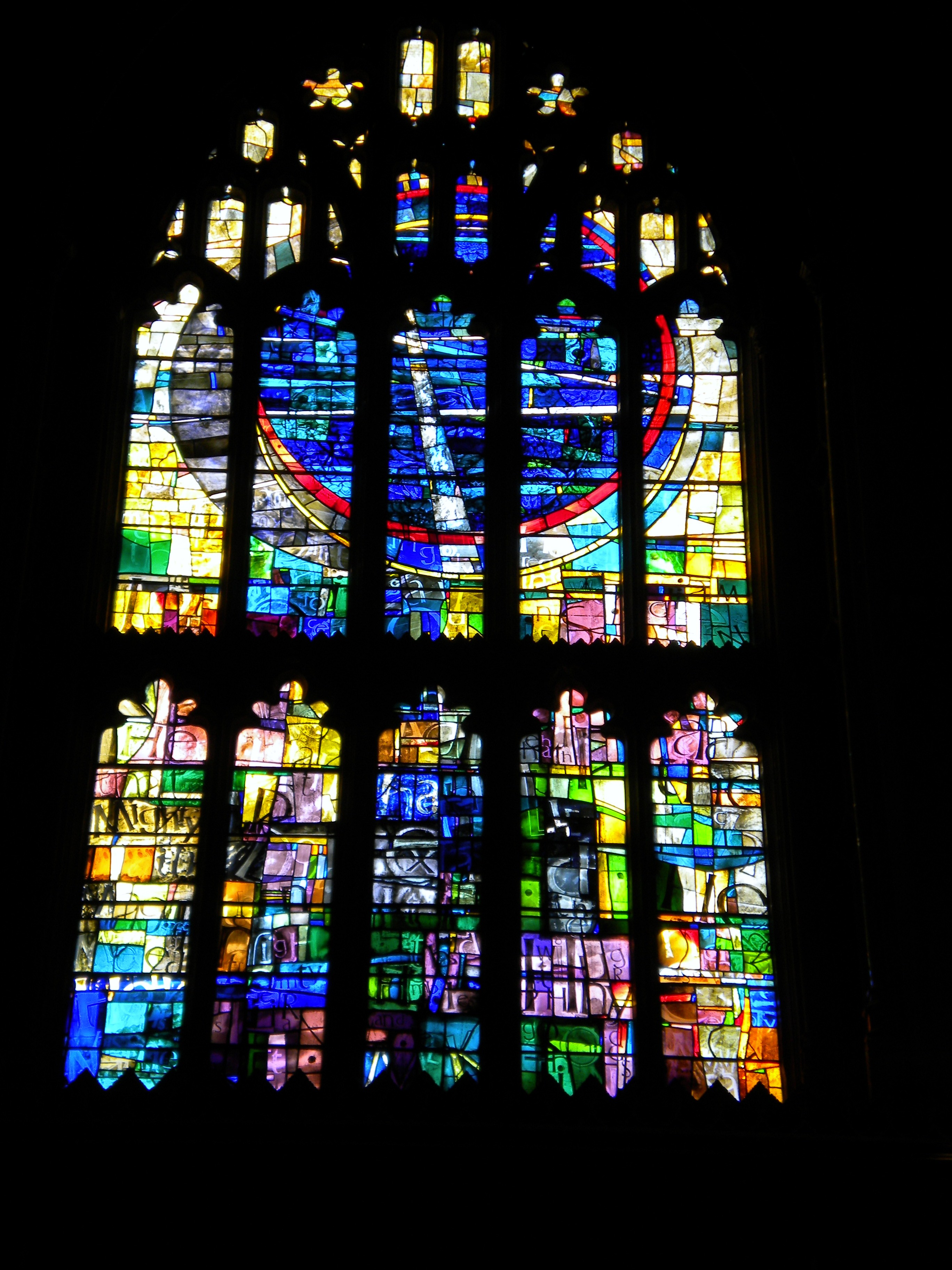
St Mary Window, Manchester Cathedral (1980)

Antony Hollaway (8 March 1928 – 9 August 2000) was a British stained glass designer, craftsman and sculptor.

== Biography ==
Hollaway was born and grew up in Dorset and educated there at Poole Grammar School and Bournemouth College of Art, followed by the Royal College of Art in London.

The Brandon Estate in Kennington, south London features a large mural by Hollaway, commissioned by London County Council's Edward Hollamby, commemorating the Chartists' meeting at Kennington Common on 10 April 1848.

Hollaway designed and made five large stained glass windows in Manchester Cathedral, installed between 1973 and 1995.
