= Alexandra Arts Centre, Bognor Regis =

Theatre in Bognor Regis, England

Alexandra Arts Centre
- Regis Centre
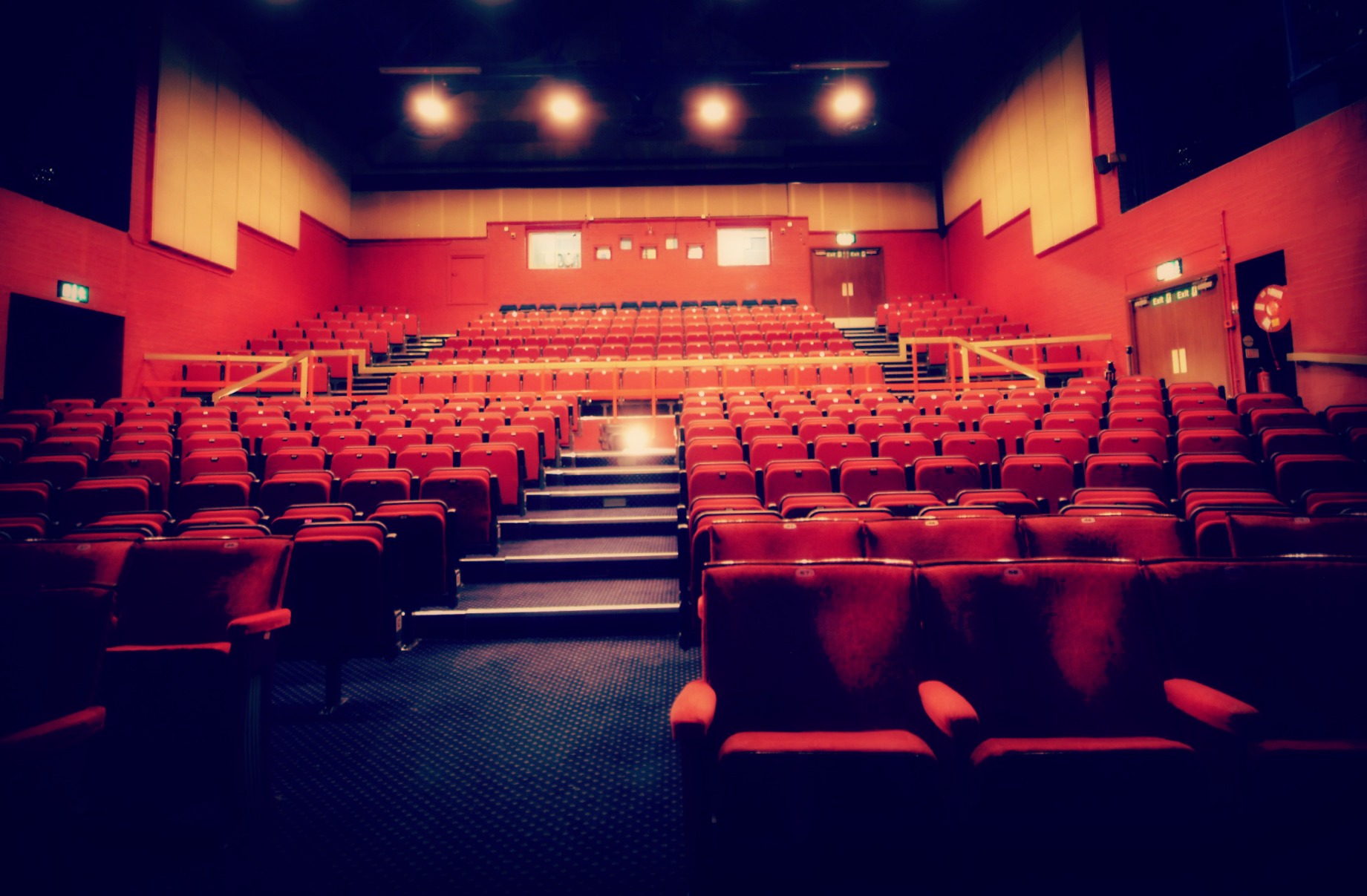
- The Alexandra Theatre auditorium
- Interactive map of Alexandra Arts Centre
- Address: Belmont Street; Bognor Regis; United Kingdom
- Coordinates: 50.782941°N 0.671828000000005°W
- Owner: Arun Arts Ltd.
- Capacity: 357
- Current use: Theatre

Construction
- Opened: 11 March 1980
- Years active: 1980–present
- Architect: Roger Westman

Website
- www.alexandratheatre.co.uk

The Alexandra Arts Centre, formerly the Regis Centre, is an arts centre in the British town of Bognor Regis. Its main hall is the 357-seat Alexandra Theatre showing a variety of entertainment from comedy to drama to pantomime. It is part of the Regis Centre, which offers a range of entertainment from dance, musicals, drama, music and family events.

== Facilities ==
In addition to the Alexandra Theatre, the venue also has a cafe, charity shop and two studio spaces. The venue is operated by registered charity Arun Arts Ltd.

== Construction ==
It was completed in 1980 by chief architect Roger Westman - along with Eric Pelling and Bill Reed.

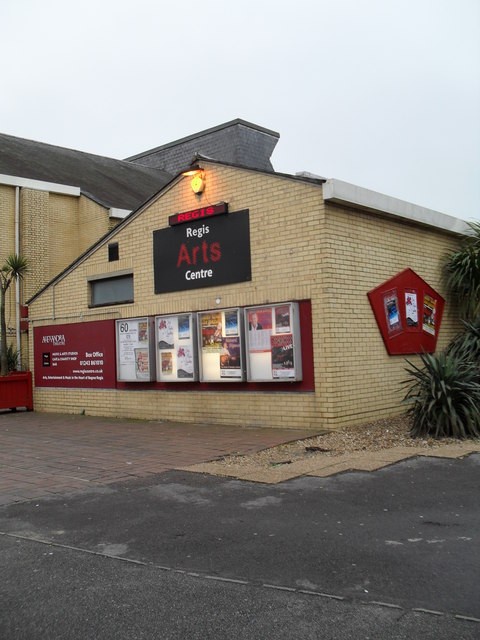
Arts Centre exterior

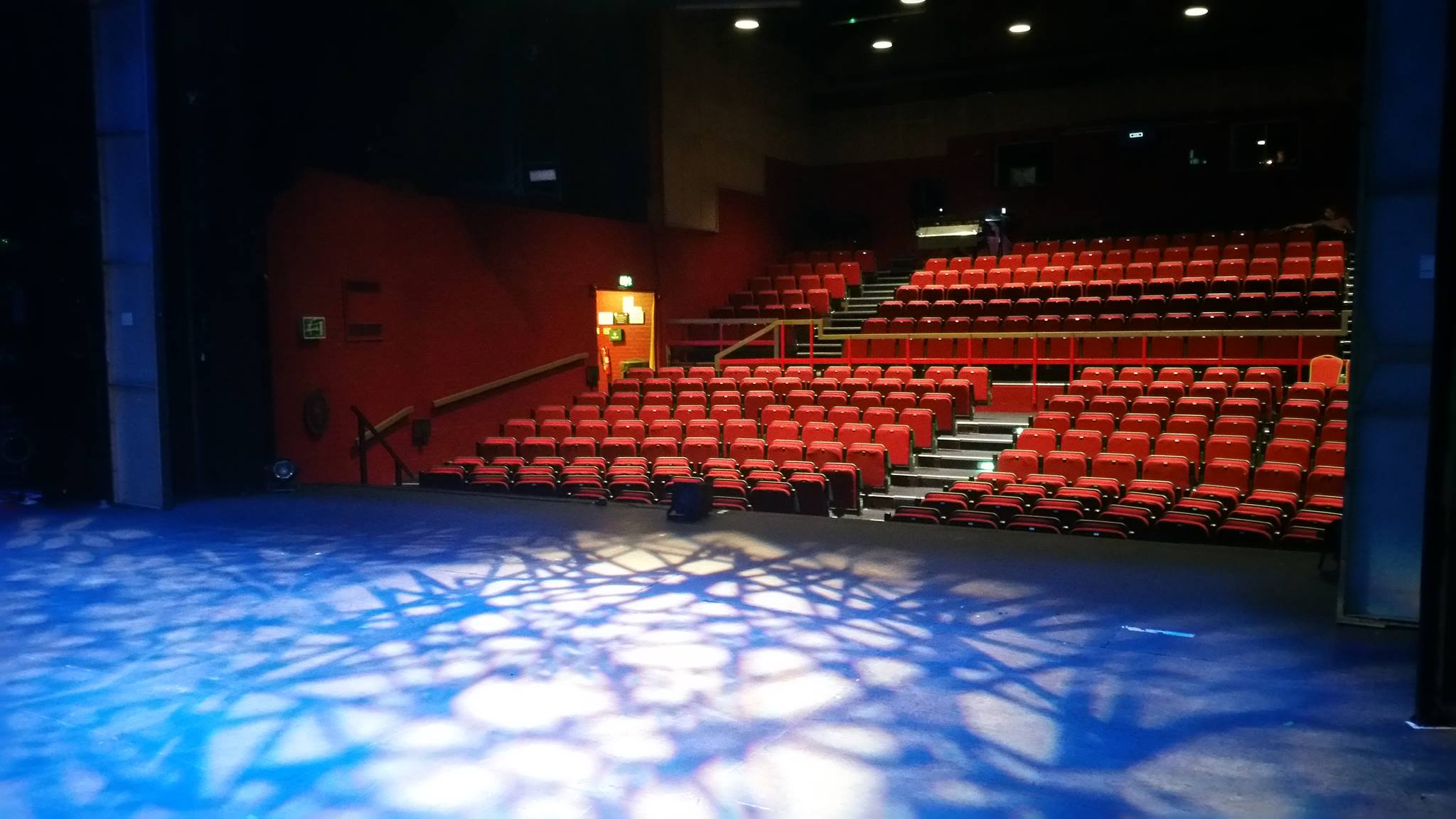
Alexandra Theatre auditorium

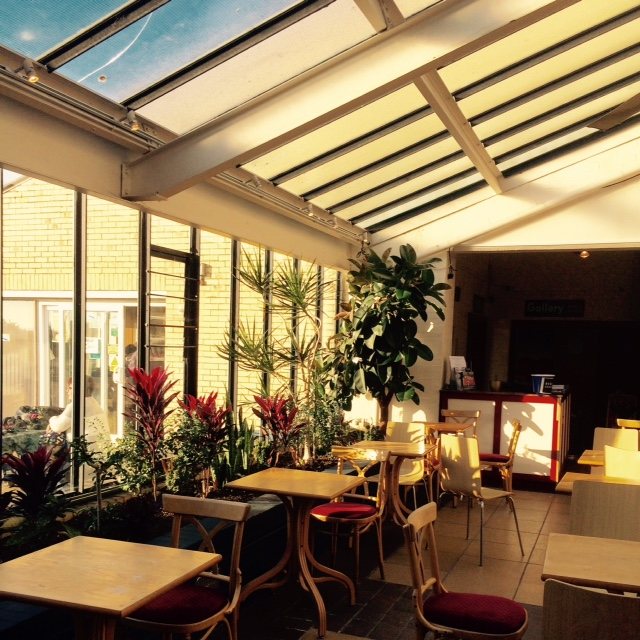
Foyer
