= 15 Storeys High =

British sitcom

- 2007 DVD cover
- Created by: Sean Lock
- Written by: Sean Lock; Martin Trenaman; Mark Jones (Note: Mark Lamarr credited with his real name.)
- Directed by: Mark Nunneley
- Starring: Sean Lock; Benedict Wong
- No. of series: 2
- No. of episodes: 12

Production
- Producer: Phil Bowker
- Running time: 30 min

Original release
- Network: BBC Choice; BBC Three; BBC Two
- Release: 7 November 2002 – 18 March 2004

15 Storeys High is a British sitcom, set in a residential tower block in south London. Created and co-written by Sean Lock, it originated as two radio series broadcast in 1998–2000, transferring to television in 2002–2004. The television series starred Sean Lock and Benedict Wong.

== Premise ==
Vince is an anti-social eccentric who wants to live by his own peculiar set of rules and ensure that his henpecked lodger/flatmate Errol abides by them too. They live in a drab flat in a tower block with a collection of seemingly crazed residents. Working as a lifeguard at the local swimming pool and with an acute phobia for being touched, Vince does his best to avoid dealing with other people. Due to his lack of social skills, he manages to get himself into a succession of awkward situations: from teaching a swimming student with a psychotic husband; to helping a neighbour look after his new pet (a horse); to conducting a bitter feud with a gang of kids intent on destroying him.

== Cast and characters ==
- Sean Lock as Vince Clark:
  A misanthropic sardonic recluse who shares his flat with Errol in a tower block. Lock described him as a particular type, "There's a lot of people in London who kind of get washed up in a place, and they don't really necessarily take part in normal life. They don't have families, they don't interact socially, they lose touch with their friends, people move on in life ... they kind of get left somewhere on a shelf. That's what Vince was like. He continually was finding new ways to isolate himself – protect himself from actually recognising what his life was like."
- Benedict Wong as Errol Spears:
  Vince's naive but optimistic flatmate/lodger. Errol's relationship with Vince is similar to classic double acts and described as "comic foils ... a little bit Laurel and Hardy ... the idiot who knows everything and the idiot who knows nothing". Peter Serafinowicz, who played Errol in the radio series, was actually doing an impression of Wong and suggested the role to him. The part was not specifically written for a Chinese actor but Lock was unable see anyone else in the flat with Vince saying, "when Benny [Wong] came in, he seemed to make sense of it".

Additional cast members included Aml Ameen, James Bachman, Bill Bailey, Perry Benson, Cavan Clerkin, Felix Dexter, Simon Godley, Michael Greene, Melanie Gutteridge, Toby Jones, Mark Lamarr, Dan Mersh, Tracy-Ann Oberman, Paul Putner, Pearce Quigley, Peter Serafinowicz, Michael Smiley, William Tomlin and Steven Webb.

== History ==
=== Sean Lock's 15 Minutes of Misery (Radio 4) ===
The show's original incarnation was a radio series entitled Sean Lock's 15 Minutes of Misery. It was broadcast weekly on BBC Radio 4 in the "Late Night on 4" comedy slot at 11.00pm. It ran for six episodes between 30 December 1998 and 3 February 1999. The show was written by Sean Lock and produced by Dan Freedman, and starred Lock, Kevin Eldon and Hattie Hayridge.

=== Sean Lock: 15 Storeys High (Radio 4) ===
Lock's second series was entitled Sean Lock: 15 Storeys High, and it was also broadcast on Radio 4's "Late Night on 4" comedy slot and written by Sean Lock and Martin Trenaman and produced by Chris Neill. Each series had five half-hour episodes. Series one aired from 24 November 1999 to 22 December 1999, and starred Lock, along with Felix Dexter, Jenny Eclair, Tim Mitchell, Tracy-Ann Oberman, Chris Pavlo and Peter Serafinowicz. Series two aired from 24 November 2000 to 22 December 2000, and included roles from Dan Freedman, Alex Lowe, Dan Mersh, Paul Putner, Rob Rouse and Chris Neill. The 15 Storeys High radio series used a different method to present the events going on in other flats in the tower block. It dispensed with the idea of Sean listening in on others using "Bugger King", replacing it with a voiceover simply announcing the flat number of the subsequent scene. The show introduced Sean's flatmate Errol (played by Serafinowicz in series 1, episodes 2–5).

Both radio series (Sean Lock's 15 Minutes of Misery and Sean Lock: 15 Storeys High) were recorded in front of a studio audience. The theme tune used for both series is the 1960s song "England Swings" by Roger Miller.

== Television series ==
In 2002, 15 Storeys High was made into a BBC Television show which ran for two series; each series had six half-hour episodes. The show was filmed on location and therefore without a live audience.

=== Writing ===
The 15 Storeys High TV series was written by Lock with Trenaman and Mark Lamarr credited with his real name Mark Jones.

Each series took six to seven months to write. Lock's view was, "The hardest thing to write is sitcom. 15 Storeys High is the hardest thing I've worked on. 12 hours a day, 7 days a week. To do a decent sitcom. To do a shit sitcom, you can do that without much effort, and there are plenty of those around." The writing process did not follow a particular structure or pursuit of a story arc. Trenaman recalled that Lock would come in the office one day and say, "I want to do something about an airport, something about travelling ... We'd just set off. There was no plan of action."

During filming, Lock allowed some improvisation that made scenes funnier. At other times, Lock's attention to detail would be more restrictive when some actors felt they could improve a line. Lock was adamant about retaining certain dialogue, explaining the effort taken to write something would be wasted, but also that the pay-off on a later joke related to the plot would be compromised.

Lock and Lamarr found they could avoid unnecessary exposition dialogue between scenes when director Mark Nunneley showed they could simply use wipe transitions during the film edit.

Trenaman's other recollection about writing the show, "... is laughing a lot in that office – I mean really rip-roaring laughs. The other memory I have is both of us staring at the wall in silence for hours and going, 'I can't think of anything'".

=== Filming ===
15 Storeys High is noted for its drab, grainy, washed-out style to reflect the mundanity of the characters' lives. Directed by Mark Nunneley, the series was filmed unlike any show at the time, including the in-vogue mockumentary style. Lock was influenced by arthouse films and cited Andrei Tarkovsky's science fiction film Stalker (1979) as one that affected him profoundly. Trenaman said, "[Lock] wanted it shot like a Swedish art film. At the time I thought it was a brilliant idea. But people at meetings were going, 'Really...? What, a sitcom on the BBC shot like that?!' It was really Sean's vision".

Filmed mainly on location, the interior rooms of the tower block were filmed in a studio. The exterior view from the 15th floor was a huge photograph and the lighting was done in such a way that it could appear to be day or night. A joke on set was, "Can we not afford any lights? Mark, are there any lights in the budget?!"

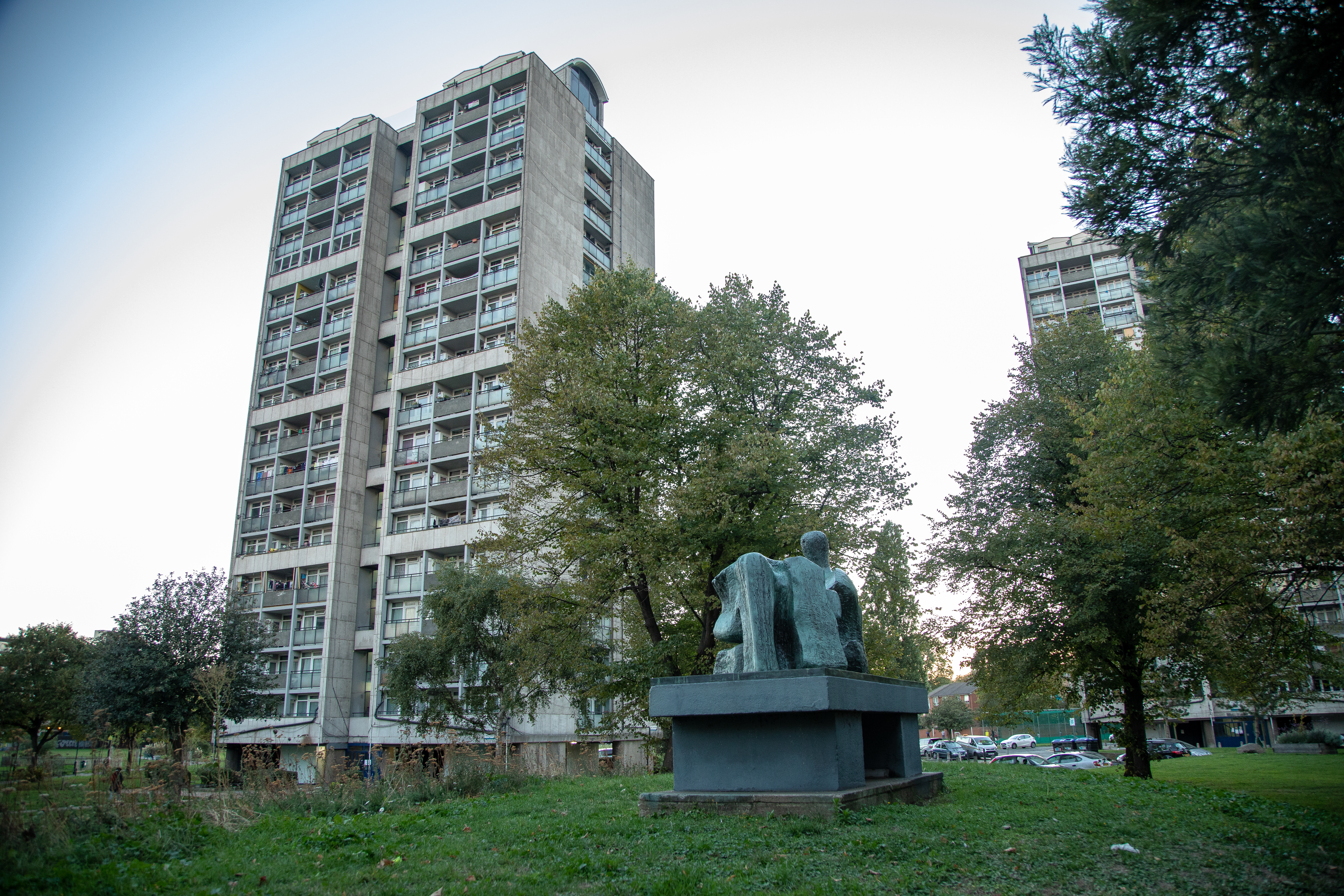
Brandon Estate tower block featured in the series

==== Locations ====
Exteriors for the tower block are located in the Brandon Estate, Kennington, London. The swimming pool for the first series, where Vince works as a lifeguard, is in the Ladywell Leisure Centre in Lewisham, London. In the second series, the swimming pool is situated in the basement of the Shell Centre next to Waterloo station. The former Elephant and Castle shopping centre was also a location in several episodes, including the Sundial restaurant and the bowling alley.

==== Music ====
The opening title theme music varied with each episode and included Tito Puente's version of "On the Street Where You Live", alluding to the lyric in the first verse "All at once am I, several stories high, knowing I'm on the street where you live"; and a backwards remix of Madness's "House of Fun".

=== Broadcast ===
The series was the victim of poor scheduling and did not get the attention given to other successful turn-of-the-millennium era British comedies, such as The Office, Phoenix Nights and The Royle Family. These sitcoms similarly moved away from the traditional live studio audience and laugh track format using multiple cameras to a single-camera setup visual style.

The show was originally broadcast on the digital channel BBC Choice, which was later rebranded to BBC Three, from 7 November 2002 to 12 December 2002. It was not promoted to a mainstream terrestrial channel with a larger prime time audience the same way Little Britain transferred from BBC Three to BBC One.

The second series, broadcast from 12 February 2004 to 18 March 2004 on BBC Three, ended up being repeated on BBC Two in May and June the same year in a late Sunday night slot. One episode was delayed even further due to the overrun of the preceding live "badger watch" show hosted by Bill Oddie who exclaimed, "There are some sitcom fans who are going to be disappointed ... but we're going to see some badgers in a minute!"

== Legacy ==
The show was not recommissioned for a third series and has never been repeated for broadcast on the BBC since 2005. It was subsequently repeated on digital channel Gold in the "After Dark" graveyard slot from 2014 until 2016.

The hard work making the series, followed by the inept management in programming, left Lock disillusioned by the experience. He then steered his TV career to appearances on panel shows. In contrast, Wong recalled his experience with fondness and has progressed to a Hollywood career starring in big budget streaming shows such as Marco Polo playing Kublai Khan and appearing in Marvel movies. As to why the show was badly handled by the BBC, Lock opined, "I think I must have spilt a drink somewhere once at a BBC party. Or called someone a cunt. That's more likely. I was drunk and called someone a cunt."

15 Storeys High has since been reappraised after Lock's death in 2021. The show gained a new cult audience on DVD. In memory of Lock, a campaign for its return resulted in the series becoming available again on BBC iPlayer.

== Episodes ==
=== Series 1 (2002) ===
Episode	Title	Written by	Directed by	Original release date
1	"The Sofa"	Sean Lock & Martin Trenaman	Mark Nunneley	7 November 2002
Vince decides to advertise for a new flatmate and ends up with unemployed student Errol. When he decides to sell his sofa, the day ends in trauma when he ends up losing his Tesco Clubcard and two voluptuous women decide to force themselves upon him.
2	"The Model"	Sean Lock	Mark Nunneley	14 November 2002
Nothing goes smoothly when Vince teaches a model to swim, leading to a confrontation with a very jealous husband. Meanwhile, Errol's clumsiness results in him having to entirely redecorate Vince's bathroom, but he is embarrassed by magazines.
3	"Blue Rat"	Sean Lock & Martin Trenaman	Mark Nunneley	21 November 2002
A bargain energy drink from an Eastern European supermarket causes Vince a few problems, including having to hide a neighbour's Shetland pony. Meanwhile, Errol gets a job down at Billingsgate Fish Market, but they wind him up with traditional initiation pranks.
4	"Ice Queen"	Sean Lock	Mark Nunneley	28 November 2002
Vince is attracted to his upstairs neighbour, but finds it difficult to pierce her icy exterior. Meanwhile, an Evangelical Christian causes trouble for Vince when he turns up on his doorstep in a number of different guises.
5	"Pool Kids"	Sean Lock & Martin Trenaman	Mark Nunneley	5 December 2002
A war of words between Vince and the local kids causing trouble at the swimming pool threatens to escalate into all out war after fireworks are posted through his letterbox, and posters of him being labelled the messiah for bald people being put up around town.
6	"Dead Swan"	Sean Lock	Mark Nunneley	12 December 2002
Vince decides to have his holiday snaps from two years ago published, but a photo of him holding a dead swan taken by his ex-girlfriend leads to him being accused of a crime that could have him facing a lengthy term in prison. This episode was produced as the pilot and originally had a laugh track and did not include the title sequence.

=== Series 2 (2004) ===
Episode	Title	Written by	Directed by	Original release date
1	"Vince the Shirker"	Sean Lock, Martin Trenaman & Mark Jones	Mark Nunneley	12 February 2004
Vince falls for the aqua aerobics instructor, Stacey, while Errol tries to conquer his phobia of saying "no". Later, Vince takes co-worker Darren out for his birthday, but his plans to take him to a surprise party organised by Stacey go badly wrong when a thug loses his jacket.
2	"Car Boots and Pigeon Shit"	Sean Lock, Martin Trenaman & Mark Jones	Mark Nunneley	19 February 2004
Car-boot sales, pigeon droppings and ping-pong enthusiasts converge to create a bad day for Vince. To make matters worse, a bunch of local estate kids have taken to smoking weed in the lifts, and Errol decides to take up bodybuilding after returning home stoned.
3	"Holiday"	Sean Lock, Martin Trenaman & Mark Jones	Mark Nunneley	26 February 2004
Vince attempts to go on holiday, leaving Errol alone in the flat with strict instructions. Things don't go to plan, however, when an argument with the check-in receptionist leads to Vince ripping up his ticket and ending up insulting Finnish people in a number of different ways.
4	"Plough"	Sean Lock, Martin Trenaman & Mark Jones	Mark Nunneley	4 March 2004
Vince wakes up after a night out and realises he has stolen a plough. He tries to return it, but later discovers that while drunk, he wrecked a graveyard. However, the vicar is more interested in becoming friends with him. Errol takes Vince's advice and tries to become less 'boring'.
5	"The Baby"	Sean Lock, Martin Trenaman & Mark Jones	Mark Nunneley	11 March 2004
Vince applies for the job as manager of the swimming pool, but is forced to look after a plastic baby as part of his training. Errol starts smoking after using a nicotine patch as a replacement bandage.
6	"Errol's Women"	Sean Lock, Martin Trenaman & Mark Jones	Mark Nunneley	18 March 2004
Vince's depression has caused Errol, who has become irresistible to the ladies, to seek help.

== Award nomination ==
In 2003, 15 Storeys High was nominated for a BAFTA in the "Television Craft: New Director - Fiction" category for Mark Nunneley.
