= Brandon Estate =

Housing estate in London

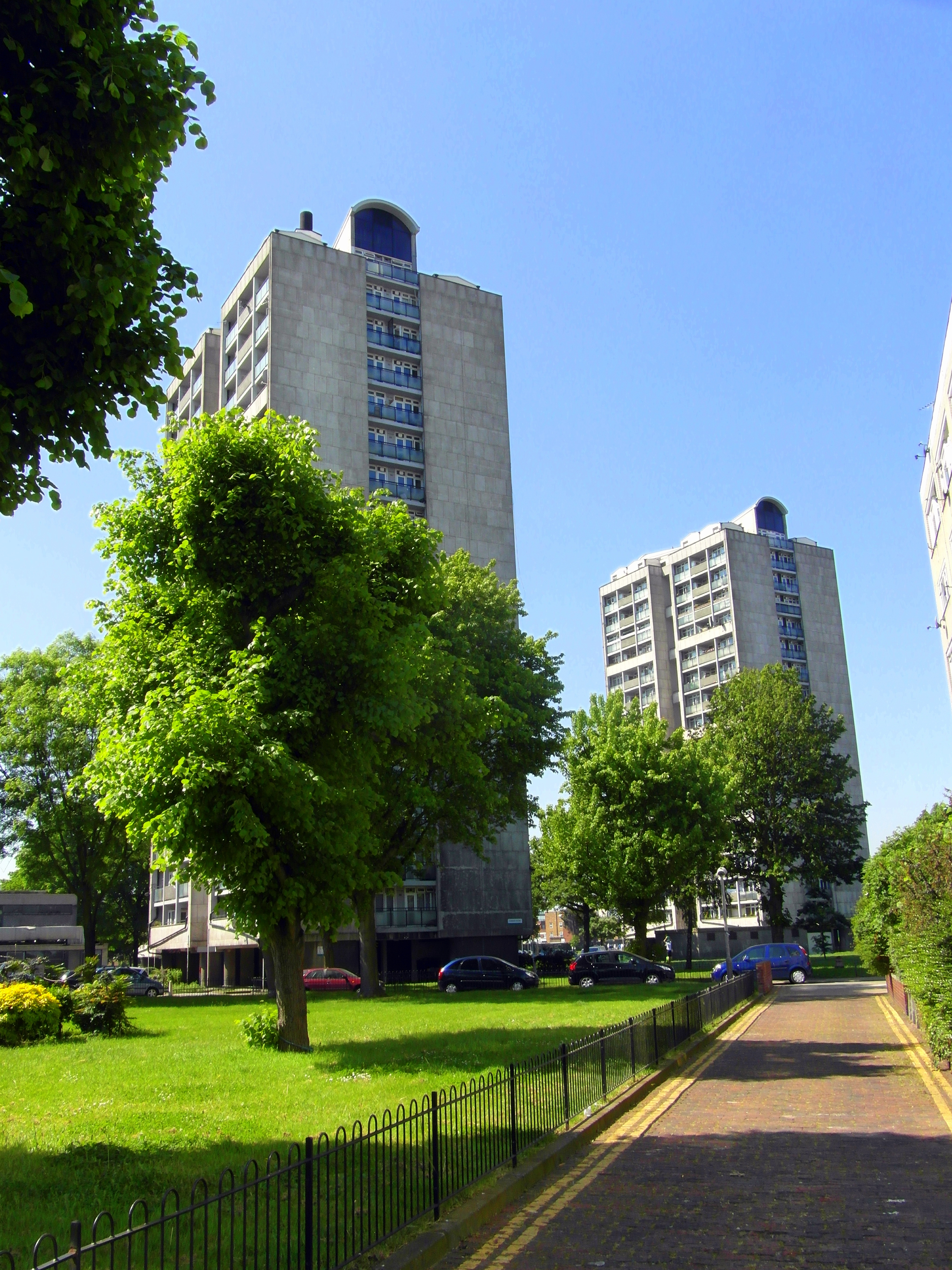
- Interactive map of Brandon Estate

General information
- Location: Otto Street SE17 3NW London
- Coordinates: 51.4830°N 0.1038°W

Construction
- Constructed: 1958
- Architect: Edward Hollamby and Roger Westman

Other information
- Famous residents: Kenny Sansom, footballer

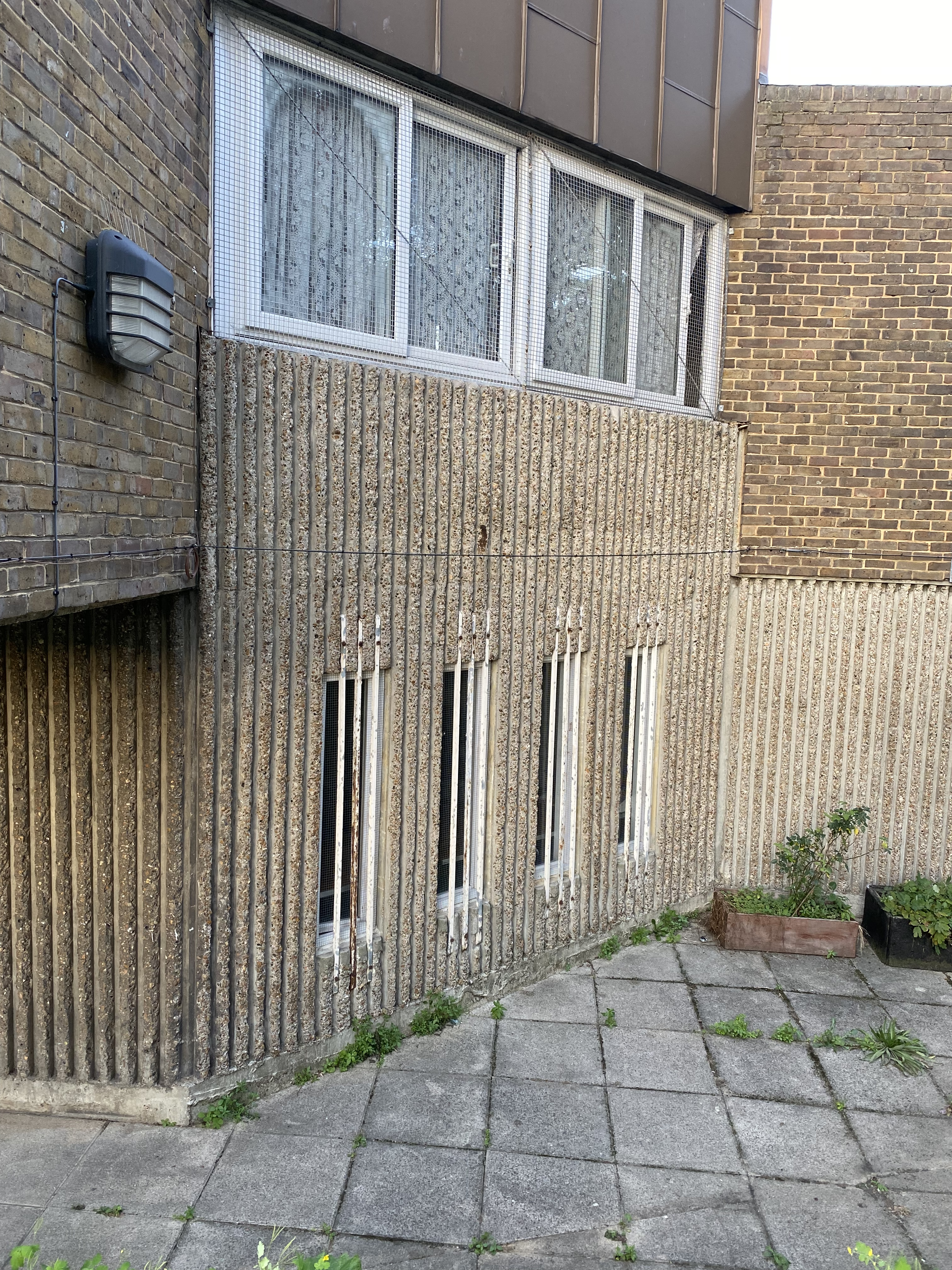
Brandon Estate, Southwark

The Brandon Estate is a social housing estate in Walworth, London Borough of Southwark, south London. Situated to the south of Kennington Park, it was built in 1958 by the London County Council, to designs by Edward Hollamby and Roger Westman.

== History ==
The estate is named after Thomas Brandon, a gardener, who obtained permission by Act of Parliament to let land within (Walworth) manor on building leases for 99 years in 1774.

The estate's initial development included six 18-storey towers (at the time, the tallest in London, helping the development achieve the required density of 136 persons per acre), a new square and other lower buildings, and the rehabilitation of some Victorian terraces.

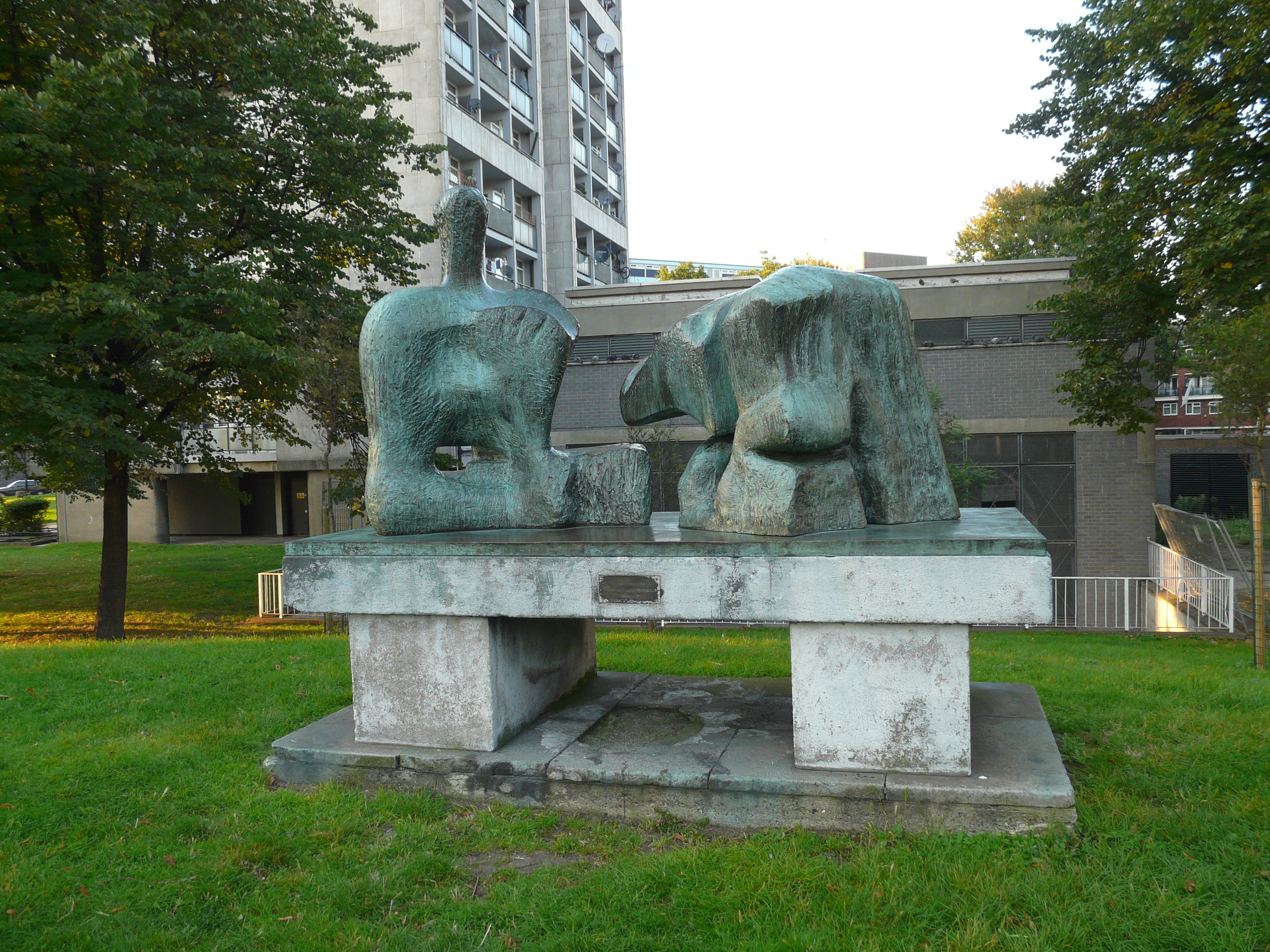
Reclining Figure No. 3 by Henry Moore

The estate also features a large mural by Tony Hollaway, commissioned by Hollamby, commemorating the Chartists' meeting at Kennington Common on 10 April 1848. In late 1962, a statue, Two Piece Reclining Figure No.3 1961, by Henry Moore, was purchased by LCC and installed on the estate. Initially placed on a high plinth, it was repositioned on a sloping lawn site in 1989 to make it more accessible. The sculpture is Grade II listed.

=== Critical reaction ===
At the beginning of the development, tenants who had moved from worse accommodation found the estate an improvement on their previous accommodation. The Architects' Journal said the scheme was "an important essay by the LCC to create a community in the true sense of the word rather than a mere housing estate. The diversification of design, although it has sometimes degenerated into inconsistency, reflects the provision for a wide variety of social activities… This is a positive attempt to overcome a major failure of much inter-war housing in the London area."

The combination of towers, low-rise blocks and refurbished terraces meant, according to Nikolaus Pevsner, "most of the buildings blend successfully into the surrounding urban fabric". The poet John Betjeman commented that the estate was "attractive, habitable by modern standards, and probably the beginning of a general raising of the self-respect of the neighbourhood."

=== Later history ===
By the end of the 1970s, the estate started to become more socially problematic, with new waves of families arriving from other slum clearances and the council prioritising more disadvantaged people and immigrant communities. The local press carried headlines such as: ‘Vandal-hit estate goes to war’, ‘Corridors of Fear’, ‘It’s revolting! Slum estate tenants in new protest’.

There is a Southwark blue plaque on one of the estate buildings, honouring the Crystal Palace, Arsenal and England footballer Kenny Sansom.

== In popular culture ==
The sitcom 15 Storeys High used the estate as a backdrop for the exterior locations. It has also been featured in the TV shows Spooks, Silent Witness and The Bill. The sci-fi series Doctor Who used the estate as the location of the fictional Powell Estate, home of the Doctor's companion Rose Tyler (played by Billie Piper) for several series.

Some scenes in the film For Queen and Country were shot at Hanworth House on the estate.

Video of the estate from the early 1960s are held by the Brandon Estate Cine Club, which "made Super 8 films of events on the estate organised by the social club – using a camera bought by 17-year old Brian Waterman with his first pay-packet from his job on the Underground". The Brandon estate is the subject of the oral history The People of Providence: A housing Estate and Some of Its Inhabitants (1983) by Tony Parker.
