= Roger Westman =

British architect (1939–2020)

- Born: Roger Ulick Branch Westman; 16 September 1939; Jarrow, County Durham
- Died: 29 April 2020 (aged 80); Hampstead Garden Suburb, London
- Education: Architectural Association School of Architecture
- Occupation: Architect
- Spouse: Elizabeth Jula Rabl (m. 1965)
- Parent: Kenneth Westman (father)

Roger Ulick Branch Westman (16 September 1939 – 29 April 2020) was a British architect. He is best known for his designs of council housing in London.

== Early life and education ==
Westman was born at Jarrow, County Durham in 1939, the eldest son of Kenneth Westman, a diplomat stationed in Madrid. Educated at Norland Place School, Colet Court, and Latymer Upper School in Hammersmith, he studied architecture at the Architectural Association School of Architecture from 1957. At the AA he received the RIBA Howard Colls Travelling Studentship Award in 1959, allowing him to study for a short time at the Polytechnic University of Milan.

== Architectural career ==
Westman began his career at Lambeth council's architecture planning department. He worked with Edward Hollamby and Rosemary Stjernstedt on Central Hill Estate, a social housing estate completed in 1974. He designed a large number of homes in Hampstead, Hampstead Garden Suburb, and Highgate. Westman was an early proponent of sustainable architecture in large-scale building projects. He wrote an article on sustainable architecture in 1982 for the Architects' Journal. During his career, he won several prizes from the Royal Institute of British Architects. In 1967 Westman was involved in a documentary about twentieth century British architecture, 'Faces of Architecture', directed by Hugh Grieves and produced by the British Film Institute (BFI). Westman gave guest lectures on architectural history at the AA, Cambridge, Oxford Brookes and Bath until 1999.

== Art and design ==
=== Exhibitions ===
Between June and July 1981, Westman exhibited his scheme 'Walls: A Framework for Communal Anarchy' at the Institute of Contemporary Arts. Westman's exhibition received positive reviews in The Times and the London Evening Standard. The RIBA and Architectural Association hold collections of drawings by Westman. Two of Westman's paintings of Oxfordshire churches were on display for a time at the Royal Academy of Arts.

=== Set design ===
Westman used his hands-on artistic ability to great effect in designing and creating sets at opera houses and theatres including the Royal Opera House, London Coliseum, and the National Theatre. Whilst still a student, he worked for the Royal Shakespeare Company as a set designer on productions of As You Like It, Hamlet, A Midsummer Night's Dream and others.

== Selected projects ==
- Pepys Estate (1966)
- Cheviot Gardens, Lambeth (1968)
- Tara Hotel, Kensington (1973)
- Central Hill Estate (1974)
- Cressingham Gardens (1978)
- Alexandra Theatre, Bognor Regis (1980)
- South Lambeth Estate (1982)
- Jerma Palace Hotel, Malta (1982)
- Myatt's Fields South Estate (1984)

== Personal life ==
Westman married Jula, daughter of lawyer and diplomat Rudolf Rabl, in 1965. Together they had two children. He was a maternal cousin of Evelyn Seymour, 17th Duke of Somerset and a great-great-grandson of soldier and poet Sir Edward Christopher Richard Ulick Branch KCMG CBE. Another distant relative was George Spencer-Churchill, 5th Duke of Marlborough.

A member of the Twentieth Century Society, he was instrumental in the preservation of several historically important 20th-century buildings. He was a friend of his tutor John Summerson until Summerson's death in 1992. Westman died on 29 April 2020.
