= Cressingham Gardens =

Housing estate in Lambeth, London

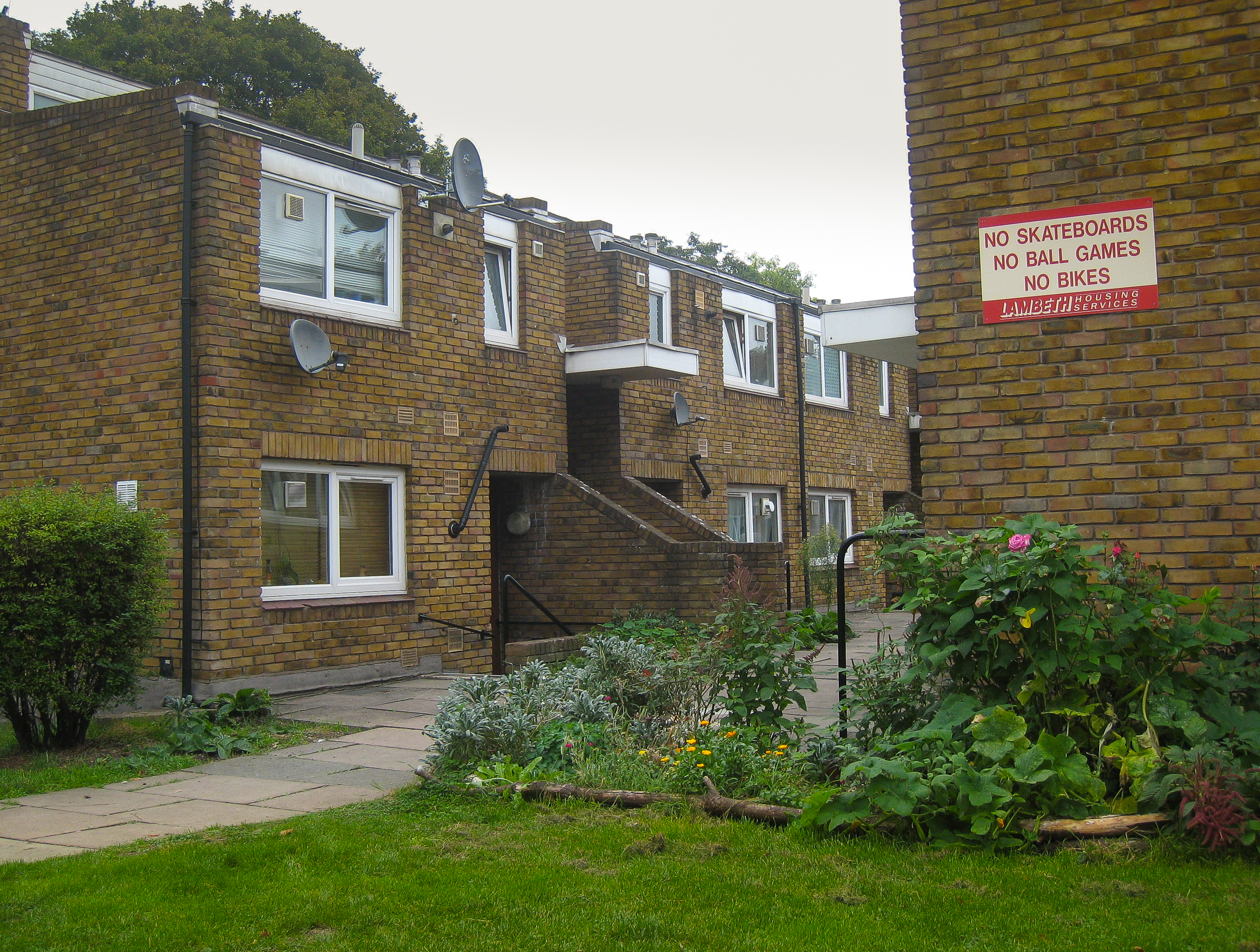
- Cressingham Gardens Estate
- Interactive map of Cressingham Gardens

General information
- Location: Brockwell Park, Lambeth, London
- Coordinates: 51.4460°N 0.1121°W
- Status: threat of demolition
- Area: 10 acres (4.0 ha)
- No. of units: 306

Construction
- Constructed: 1968–1978
- Architect: Edward Hollamby and Roger Westman
- Contractors: Direct service organisation
- Authority: London Borough of Lambeth
- Influence: garden city and garden suburb

Refurbishment
- Proposed in: 2015
- Proposed action: Demolition and rebuild
- Directing authority: London Borough of Lambeth

Cressingham Gardens is a council garden estate in Lambeth. It is located on the southern edge of Brockwell Park. It comprises 306 dwellings, a mixture of four, three and two-bedroom houses, and one-bedroom apartments. It was designed at the end of the 1960s by the Lambeth Borough Council Architect Edward Hollamby and second architect Roger Westman, and built at the start of the 1970s. In 2012 Lambeth Council proposed demolishing the estate, to replace the terraced houses by apartment blocks. Most of the apartments would then be for sale to the private sector. The residents, those in Lambeth who wish to prevent the gentrification of the borough, and those who want to conserve what they believe to be important architectural heritage, are campaigning to prevent its demolition.

Its design was inspired by the social reformers who advocated, and showed the benefit of providing houses with gardens for those who can only afford to rent. It was a reaction to the failure of council estates of multi-storey apartment blocks to provide a good family homes. Westman and Hollamby's innovative design showed how it was possible using low rise dwellings, to achieve the same residential density as estate of multi-storey apartment blocks; and how pedestrianizing the estate allowed much better use of the space between the dwellings, as this space could be used for gardens rather than car parks and access roads.

== History ==
The 1969 Lambeth Council was controlled by the Conservative Party. The Conservatives, at that time, believed that the council should provide homes for all those who could not afford to buy a house. In inner London, in the 1950s and 1960s, estates with multi-storey apartment blocks provided the dominant architectural model for council housing. The seminal study Family and Kinship in East London showed that such apartments did not prove as satisfactory a family home as a house with a garden. By the 1970s many councils were returning to building houses, rather than multi-storey apartment blocks, and Lambeth Council was a leader in this trend.

As Borough Architect, Ted Hollamby had designed different types of council dwellings, tower blocks, tenements, houses. He 'passionately believed that council housing should be as good, if not better than private housing'. His design for Cressingham Gardens was informed by failure of multi-storey tower blocks to provide good family homes. He was also aware of the importance of gardens in enhancing the quality of life of the residents of a dwelling, His design for Cressingham Gardens ensured 'every home its splash of greenery and colour'. In recognizing the importance of gardens, he was following an English tradition of the garden city and garden suburbs.

In 1969 Ted Hollamby submitted his team's design for Cressingham Gardens to the Housing Committee. The deputy chairman of the housing committee was Sir John Major. The committee recognized the exceptional importance of the innovative design and minuted 'congratulations to Cressingham's architects on their ‘bold and imaginative scheme'.

The initial contract for the building estate was for £1.58 million, or approximately £5,500 per dwelling. If the retail price index is used to convert to 2015 prices the costs are: £24 million for the build, with a cost per dwelling of £80,000.

The building of Cressingham Gardens was interrupted by a national building strike, and the contractors terminated the contract. In 1970 Lambeth Council became Labour controlled. To complete the estate, the new housing committee, on the advice of Ken Livingstone, who was deputy chairman, authorized the use direct labour. Building the three hundred dwellings took seven years.

== Urban design innovations ==
The estate is built at very high residential density, over 250 persons/hectare (100/ acre). In order to provide this residential density in an estate of low rise dwellings, rather than an estate of multi-storey apartment blocks, Roger Westman had to produce a number of urban design innovations.

Underground car park on edge of the estate
The car park for Cressingham Gardens is on the edge of the estate next to the main road. This means that cars do not enter the estate. The car park is underneath a tenement block, consequently no residential land area is for the use of cars. At the time, the standard urban design practice was to provide garages in the centre of an estate. This makes inefficient use of residential land area, as roads and pavements are needed throughout an estate.
Front doors open onto pedestrian only area
In Cressingham Gardens the front doors of dwellings open on to pedestrian only avenues and pathways. This allows efficient use of residential land area, as pathways can be much narrower than roads with pavements. Experience has shown that there are substantial social benefits from having front doors open onto a pedestrian area. The most important of these is that the pedestrianized space provides a safe play area for small children.
Small front gardens

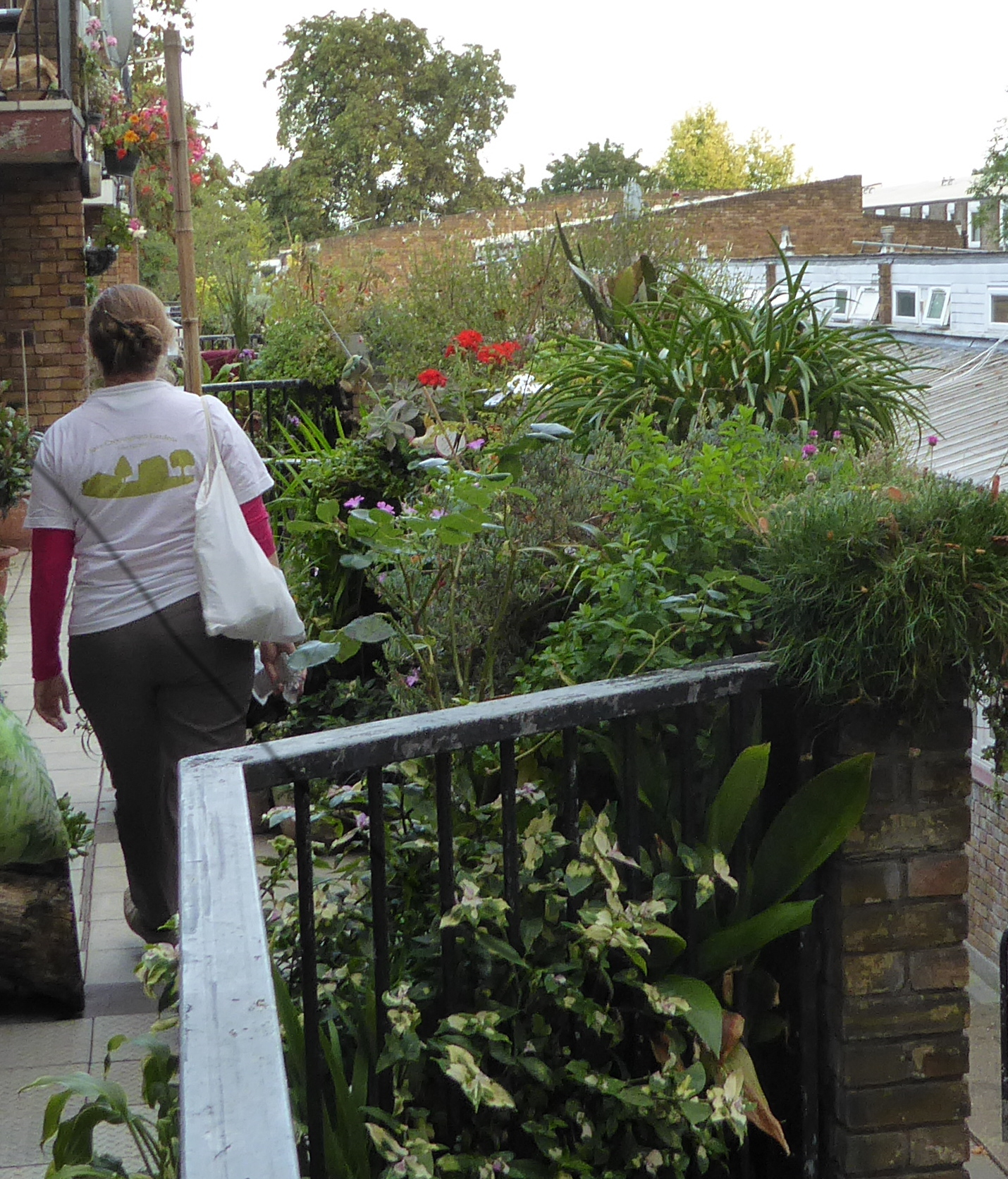
Tenant maintained frontage

Roger Westman designed the small front garden area of dwellings on the estate, in some cases no more than a flower pot on a railing. The occupier of a dwelling controls this garden frontage; and although the plot is tiny, many of the residents have been able create great garden displays.

In a council estate of multi-storey apartment blocks the frontage is normally maintained by a management company, appointed by the council, not the residents, and where there are gardens, key access is required, which means they are infrequently used.
Having a very small front garden frontage makes efficient use on residential land, as the distance between the rows of terrace houses can be reduced to a few metres. This could have led to gloomy narrow alleyways, but Ted Hollamby avoided this by specifying low pitched factory style roofs for the terraced houses.

Small back gardens
Westman also made sure that each house on the estate had a (very) small back garden. Again this allows for efficient use of residential land. It is advantageous as it encourages the resident of a house to use the garden space efficiently. In the long thin back gardens, common on London estates, the land at the back is often unused, or used as scrap heap. In high latitudes, back gardens can contribute to the healthy development of pre-school children. Children can suffer from not spending sufficient time outside as sun light is needed to make vitamin D. Inadequate vitamin D leads to poor bone development and rickets. The housing crisis in London has led to an increasing number families living in apartments with no access to out door play areas for children. It is therefore unsurprising that rickets has returned.

== Design failings ==
Lambeth Council give design failings, and the expense of bringing the estate up to modern standards, as the justification for its planned demolition.

The council-appointed consulting structural engineers identified the following problems:

Poor thermal insulation
The late 1960s was age of cheap energy, consequently the dwellings on the estate were not designed to be energy efficient. Some gains have been made through estate-wide programmes to install cavity wall insulation and double-glazed window units. There is a particular problem with the roofs. In order to allow light into the four metre wide pathways between rows of terraces, the roof lines are low, and there are no lofts. This makes upgrading the roof installation more costly than the same job on a standard house.

High maintenance guttering scheme
To simplify the drainage of the pathways and avenues, Ted Hollamby did not use the standard design of external guttering for the roofs, with multiple drain pipes along a terrace. Instead he designed gutters which were integral with the roof leading to one drain pipe at the end of the terrace. This simplified land drainage of the paths and avenues. Supposedly the maintenance costs for this scheme are higher than for traditional guttering methods, but this has not been proven, and integral guttering used in Europe and the US over the last half century does not carry a maintenance premium over and above conventional guttering. Ted Hollamby did not foresee the abolition of property taxes, and shrinking of the council tax base, and the sale of council houses and reduction in the council rental income. The consequential reduction in the council maintenance budgets, has meant that the requirement to clear the gutters frequently, has not been fulfilled. On a number of occasions the gutters have got blocked and overflowed, which has let to damage to some of the brickwork.

Inadequate land drainage
The water from the gutters overflows on to the avenues and pathways of the estate. The land drains for these were not designed to cope with the unexpected flow. This has led to water penetration and some structural damage to some of the buildings on the estate.

== Successful design features ==
Although the estate has not always been properly maintained, it has enabled a high quality of life for its residents. Ted Hollamby wanted to ensure that design of the estate led to a community developing, In this he was successful. 'Overwhelmingly, residents talk of their friendly neighbours and the estate's strong sense of community – they look out for each other, keep an eye on each other's children'.

The social mix of residents in Cressingham Gardens is the same as in the sink estates of Lambeth. The probable cause of the community spirit is that the pedestrianized avenues of the estate provide an area for friendly, neighbourly social interactions. It is these social interactions have led to a mutually supportive community amongst the ethnically and socially diverse residents on the estate.

The good indication of mutual cooperation between those on the estate is seen in the YouTube video they produced as part of their campaign to save their estate, their homes, and their community.

There are three areas where its innovative urban design has resulted in improvement over an estate of multi-storey apartment blocks.

Reduced crime
Ted Hollamby insisted that kitchen windows overlooked the pathways and avenues of the estate, and that front doors faced each other across the avenues. This is a far more effective anti crime measure than CCTV cameras, and prefigured the now ubiquitous "Safer by Design" strategies of urban architects and planners. In a multi-storey apartment block, unobserved corridors, walkways, and stairwells can create a high crime area. This was illustrated by the crime rate on the Broadwater Farm estate. However, regeneration, which eliminated the unobserved stairwells and walkways, transformed the estate into a low crime area.

Reduced traffic
Ted Hollamby's placing of the underground car park beside the road and not in the estate provides the public good of reduced traffic. As car owning residents always have to walk, at least to the car park, they will always consider completing the trip on foot, bike or public transport. When the car is outside the front door there is a natural tendency to make car the first choice for any journey, and this generates traffic.

Supportive neighbourhood community
Pedestrianisation has promoted social contact between neighbours and this has let to mutually supportive community developing. This is also a public good, as neighbours can help each other out, reducing the demand for child care services, health care service, and social services.

== Redevelopment plans ==
Lambeth Council have stated that it would cost £9.4 million (£30,000 per dwelling) to fix the structural defects on the estate. They further state that the £30,000 per dwelling to do the necessary repairs is three times what they can afford.

Instead they are proposing to redevelop the site in partnership with a property developer. The developer would pay for the site by agreeing to build apartments for social housing. Creating the vacant building plot required, will entail, demolishing all the dwellings, bulldozing the gardens and felling the trees on the site. On the cleared site multi-storey apartment blocks would be built. There will be more dwellings, 464 apartments will replace 306 houses, and apartments; but new development will be mostly one and two bedroom apartments, there will be no four bedroom houses with gardens. Hence the residential density in terms of bedrooms per hectare will approximately the same. A minority of the new dwellings will be for rent, the aspiration is 40%, the majority will be for sale to private buyers. What makes it profitable for a property developer to knock down 306 council houses and build 190 new apartments to replace them, is that he can sell 274 apartments.

The site is a prime location. It has direct access to Brockwell Park and good transport links with Gatwick Airport and St Pancras International. In such a location a developer could plan on selling a two bedroom apartment for between half and three quarters of a million pounds. In a similar scheme in at the Heygate Estate, Elephant and Castle, a one bedroom apartment sells for £569,000, and a two bedroom apartment for £801,000.

=== Gated development ===
In order for the maximum value of the site to be realised, the proposed development will be a gated community. There is now a generic design for such developments. The apartments for private sale are in a tower block on top of a car park. Entrance to the car park is through a barred gate, managed remotely by a security company. This was the standard design on display at the MIPIM property fair. The block for social housing has a separate entrance, which will tend to prevent social interaction between private owners and social housing tenants.

=== The redevelopment controversy ===
Lambeth Council claim that the plan to demolish council houses is to enable more council dwellings to be built. They say that 'London is faced with the greatest housing crisis since the Second World War', They also say that they are paying for 1,800 families to live in temporary accommodation, they have on their books 1,300 families living in severely overcrowded conditions, and 20,000, families on their waiting list. Lambeth Council say that inaction is not an option, and that in contribution to solving the housing crisis they are committed to proving a thousand new dwellings at council rent levels over the next four years. The council say they could achieve this objective through a process of estate regeneration. However, several properties in the estate have been derelict for more than twenty years.

There are many people in council dwellings, in Brixton, Lambeth Walk, and Stockwell who do not trust the council, they fear that the council is engaged in a policy of gentrification, and the real aim of the redevelopment is to increase property values in the borough, to the benefit of owner occupiers in Herne Hill, West Dulwich, and Streatham.

Those renting from the council fear that tenants who lose their homes in redevelopment projects will be relocated out of the borough, and building the new dwellings to allow them to return, will be delayed indefinitely.

The families in Cressingham Gardens fear that when they are evicted from their house with a garden, the alternative accommodation offered will be an apartment in a tower block on a sink estate, a possibility not precluded by the Council's 'Tenants - Key guarantees' document.

The overwhelming majority of residents on the estate fear that they will lose the friendly and helpful neighbours and the benefit of living in mutually supportive community.

=== Redevelopment plans approved ===
On 23 November 2021, the Lambeth council's planning subcommittee approved plans to demolish parts of the estate and rebuild twenty new houses at Cressingham Gardens.

== Judicial review ==
On 17 July 2015 the high court ruled that Eva Bokrosova's request for judicial review of Lambeth Council decision to only consider options for demolishing Cressingham Gardens.

The court was told that Lambeth Council originally consulted on five options:

- Option 1 - Refurbishing the estate and bringing all council tenant homes up to decent homes standard, including the six void flats that have stood empty for over 16 years;
- Option 2 and 3 - Refurbishing as in Option 1, plus infilling to create new homes.
- Option 4 - Partial demolition of the estate, with the net extra in new build homes sold at top market price
- Option 5 - Full demolition and rebuilding of the estate

At the High Court Mr Justice Holman granted permission to allow Ms Bokrosova to challenge Lambeth Council's decision to ‘abruptly close down’ consultation on options 1–3, options which were strongly supported by residents.
On November 24 Mrs Justice Elisabeth Laing ruled that the decision to remove options 1, 2 and 3 from the consultation was unlawful.

== The case for listed status ==
Cressingham Gardens is shown in Open House London. This is billed as London's greatest architectural festival, on which great architecture from all periods is on display for free. On a tour of the estate were those interested in great architecture. They were told that an application had been made for Cressingham Gardens to be granted listed status, and the application had been unsuccessful. Tour members were astonished as they had seen buildings which had been given listed status, which were of far less merit than Cressingham Gardens. Their view was that a strong case could, and should be made for giving Cressingham Gardens listed status, and backing obtained for the application from those with influence. Listed building status is granted under two headings: Historical interest and important architectural model. The case is that Cressingham Gardens deserves listing under both categories.

=== Architectural model ===
The combination of Roger Westman's urban design innovations in Cressingham Gardens created an architectural model, the Council garden estate, a pedestrianized estate of houses with gardens, in which all the properties are let at council rent levels. As a pioneer of green architecture, Westman wished for more green spaces in London's mainly concrete social housing projects. This has since become an important model for inner-city housing, as the model allows very high residential densities, and it has been shown to enable a high quality of life for residents.

In May 2021 the Twentieth Century Society placed the site on its Top 10 Buildings at Risk List.
