= Rosemary Stjernstedt =

English architect and town planner

- Born: Rosemary Owen Smith; 11 June 1912; Birmingham, England
- Died: 31 October 1998 (aged 86)
- Known for: Architecture
- Notable work: Alton Estate
- Movement: avant-garde
- Spouse: Gunnar Stjernstedt

Rosemary Owen Stjernstedt (nee Smith, 11 June 1912 – 31 October 1998) was an English architect and town planner. She began her career designing furniture in London and then worked on production drawings for the Barber Institute of Fine Arts in Birmingham. After completing her education and moving to Sweden, she focused on town planning. After the end of World War II, Stjernstedt returned to England and became the first woman architect to achieve grade I status at London County Council.

== Life and career ==
Rosemary Owen Smith was born and raised in Birmingham to banker Rupert Harry Smith and Dorothy Owen and was trained as an architect at the Birmingham School of Art. After graduating in 1934, she found work designing church furniture in London before joining the more established Art Deco practice of Robert Atkinson, where she worked on the production drawings for the Barber Institute for Fine Arts in Birmingham. It was during this time that she undertook a planning course at the Architectural Association before deciding to move to Sweden in the 1939 after visiting new housing projects on her previous holiday. There, she worked for six years as an architect and town planner. She married the Swedish lawyer- from a baronial family- Gunnar Stjernstedt (born 1911), taking his surname, and moved to Gothenburg in 1943 where she worked for the City of Gothenburg Planning Office on Housing and Playground Layouts.

Stjernstedt returned to England after World War II and began working for the London County Council Housing Division. She was the first female architect to achieve grade I status at London County Council and in 1950 she became the first woman to reach senior grade I status in any British council county division. From 1951 to 1955, she led the design team for Alton East Estate, a pioneering council housing estate in Roehampton that later became grade II listed buildings.

When London County Council was dissolved in 1964, Stjernstedt began working for Lambeth London Borough Council under Ted Hollamby. There, she was in charge of the design team for a variety of projects that included the masterplan for the Central Hill Estate, another landscaped, award-winning council estate. In 1967, she moved to the Housing Development Directorate at the Department of Environment working under the architect, Pat Tindale. She helped Tinsdale with her research on layouts and on timber framed housing working closely with the Building Regulations Department. Stjernstedt retired in 1972 at the age of 60 and moved to Wales where she continued to work on modest alterations for the cottages of local people.

In 1986, RIBA invited her to be part of their panel of avant-garde women architects as recognition of her achievements. The panel included Jane Drew, Elaine Denby, Lynne Walker and Pat Tindale.

She had a son, Robert (1941–2012), an ornithologist based in Africa who inherited the Stjernstedt barony on his father's death; her partner in later life was Fred Parker. She died on 31 October 1998.
