= Andrew Westman =

English archaeologist (born 1948)

- Born: 1948 (age 77–78); Kensington, London
- Education: Latymer Upper School
- Alma mater: Corpus Christi College, Cambridge
- Occupation: Archaeologist
- Employer: Museum of London
- Known for: Archaeological studies in the City of London

Kenneth Andrew Rodney Westman is an English archaeologist and head of projects at the Museum of London. He is perhaps best known for contributing to, and editing, Archaeology in the City of London, 1907–91: a Guide to the Records of Excavations and writing the Archaeological Site Manual in 1994.

Westman attended Latymer Upper School and Corpus Christi College, Cambridge between 1967 and 1974. He has authored and co-authored many reports and books on archaeology. He works in the Museum of London's archaeology department. He has given lectures on archaeology at University College London, Royal Holloway University, the University of York, and the University of Cambridge.

== Bibliography ==
- The Church of St Alphege London (1987)
- Excavation Round-up 1991, Part 1: City of London (1992)
- From City Site to Archive Research (1992)
- Archeological Site Manual (1995)
- Archaeology in greater London, 1965-1990 : a guide to records of excavations (Museum of London, 1998)
- Upright Stratigraphy: Understanding and Recording Buildings in London, Chapter 12 (Oxford University Press, 2000)
- Measurement and Recording of Historic Buildings (Taylor & Francis, 2004)
- Roman Southwark, Settlement and Economy: Excavations in Southwark 1973-1991 (MoL Archaeology, 2008)
- Chichester City Walls (Museum of London, 2012)
