= Lubetkin =

Lubetkin is a surname. Notable people with the surname include:

- Berthold Lubetkin (1901–1990), Georgian-British architect
- Daniel Lubetkin (1931–2024), American lawyer and politician
- Mario Lubetkin (born 1958), Uruguayan journalist and Minister of Foreign Relations
- Shlomo Lubetkin (1910-1983), American author
- Zivia Lubetkin (1914–1978), Polish World War II resistance fighter
