= Central Hill Estate =

Housing estate in London

Central Hill estate
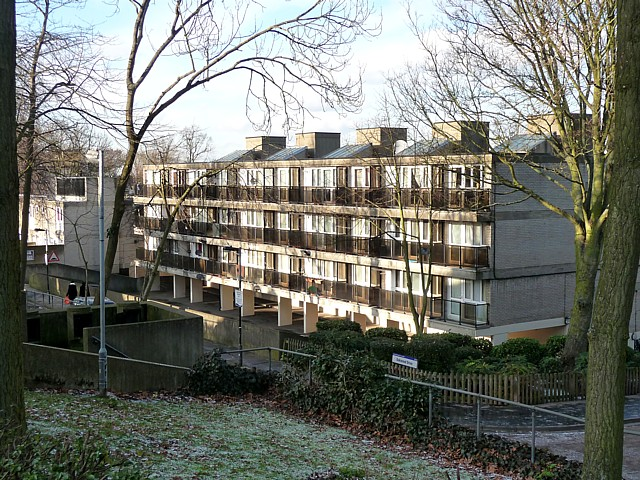
- Central Hill estate
- Interactive map of Central Hill estate

General information
- Location: Norwood, Lambeth, London
- Coordinates: 51.421058°N 0.087737°W

Construction
- Architect: Ted Hollamby, Rosemary Stjernstedt, Roger Westman
- Authority: London Borough of Lambeth

Central Hill is a social housing estate in the London Borough of Lambeth. It was designed by Rosemary Stjernstedt, Roger Westman and the Lambeth Council planning department during the directorship of Ted Hollamby. It comprises more than 450 homes built in 1966-74 near the site of the former Crystal Palace. Lambeth Council plans to demolish the estate so that it can build an extra 400 homes, many for private sale, so that it can finance the construction of new social housing.

Lambeth Council contends that homes suffer from damp and that the design of the estate encourages crime. Residents say that the crime rate is less than average and that problems with the buildings are the result of lack of maintenance by the council.

Architects PRP were appointed to explore redevelopment options for the estate in 2015 and on March 24, 2017, Lambeth Council reached a decision to completely demolish the estate. Campaign group Architects For Social Housing have been working with residents to develop an alternative regeneration plan for the estate, and residents continue to oppose the demolition of the estate.

== History ==
Central Hill Estate was built in two phases by Lambeth Council in 1967-1974. Rosemary Stjernstedt was brought in by Hollamby from the LCC and Ted Happold from Arup & Partners to advise on structural engineering. The design is celebrated by architecture scholars such as Owen Hatherley who described it as "a perfect modernist suburb, the finest of its kind south of the river".

In 2016, Historic England was criticised by the Twentieth Century Society for its decision to not list the estate for its historical value. The Society added the estate to its Risk List of architecture at risk of being lost in 2017.

== Description ==
The 162 flats and 212 houses are laid out in terraces of pale grey brick. It was conceived as a holistic community which epitomised the cradle to grave welfare state mentality of its designers and included a nurses' hostel, a day centre for the elderly and a doctors' surgery.
