= Kúðafljót =

River in Iceland

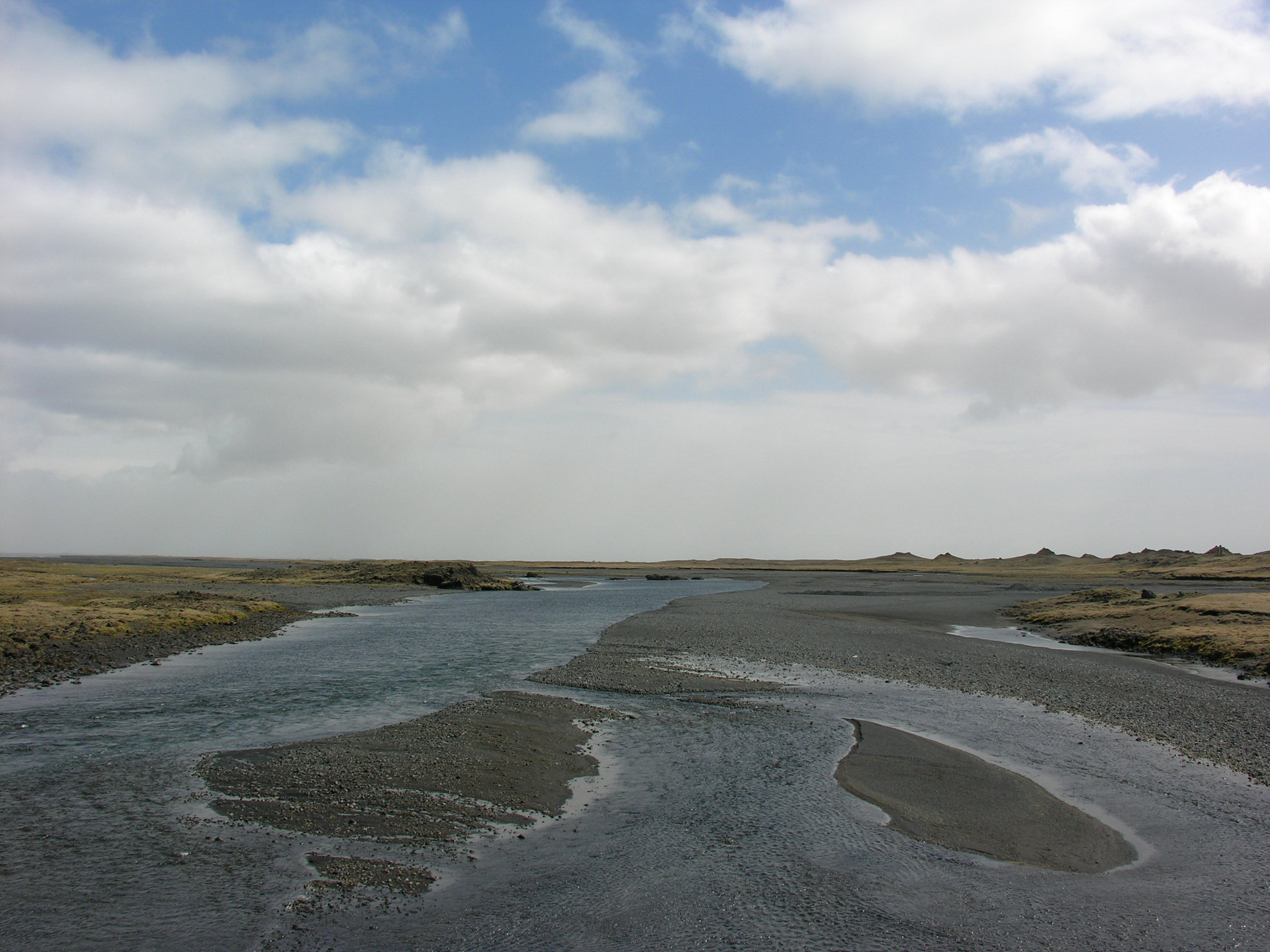
- The river before reaching Álftaver

Location
- Country: Iceland
- Region: Southern Region

Physical characteristics
- Source
  - location: Mýrdalsjökull
  - coordinates: 63.6306°N 19.05°W
- Mouth
  - location: East of Vík í Mýrdal
  - coordinates: 63.5972°N 18.3667°W
  - elevation: 0 m (0 ft)
- Length: 115 km (71 mi)

Basin features
- River system: Kúðafljót
- Tributaries
  - left: Eldvatn
  - right: Tungufljót (Mýrdalssandur), Hólmsá, Skálm

The Kúðafljót (Icelandic: [ˈkʰuːðaˌfljouːt]) is a river in the south of Iceland. It is one of the largest glacier rivers in the country.

== Name ==
The Landnámabók reports that the name is from the ship of Vilbald, one of the first settlers in Skaftátunga. The name of the ships was Kúði.

== Location and tributaries ==
It flows east of the Mýrdalsjökull through the Skaftátunga district and flows into the Atlantic Ocean through the Mýrdalssandur from numerous tributaries, the most important of which are Hólmsá, Tungufljót and Eldvatn. An arm of the Skaftá also flows into the Kúðafljót.

== Water quantity ==
The mean water volume is 230 m³/s. The lowest measured value was 110 m³/s and the maximum measured value 2000 m³/s.

The Kúðafljót is one of the rivers whose water level may indicate volcanic activity of Katla under the Mýrdalsjökull. Therefore, it is monitored closely. The Icelandic Meteorological Office monitors the Hólmsá, Eldvatn and Skálm tributaries.

Eruptions of Katla cause jökulhlaups of the Kúðafljót.

== Transport connection ==
In former times, horses were pulled across the river in shallow places. A real ford did not exist, so travellers needed local leaders and risked their lives again and again. However, it was always regarded as quite dangerous, with deep and drifting quicksand.

Today the Icelandic Ring Road crosses it at a narrower place on a bridge.

The Kúðafljót was a navigable fjord in the Middle Ages. There are also reports of a trading station on an island in this fjord. It was obviously buried by the sediments of the Katla jökulhlaups.

== Ship cemetery south coast ==
Numerous French fishing boats were found in the 19th century on Icelandic coasts. They had their main base in Fáskrúðsfjörður. Between 1850 and 1914, there were up to 5,000 men from Brittany during the seasons, so that at the end of the nineteenth century, the French government had also sent some of the hospital ships to support them. The first of these, the Saint-Paul, was stranded at the mouth of the Kúðafljót on 4 April 1899. The crew members were rescued, but the contents of the ship had to be auctioned to the delight of the local population. The cheap purchase of food and 900 bottles of wine were particularly valued.

The southeast coast of Iceland was notorious until the 1950s as a regular ship cemetery.

== See also ==
- List of rivers of Iceland
- Geography of Iceland
