= Múlakvísl =

River in Iceland

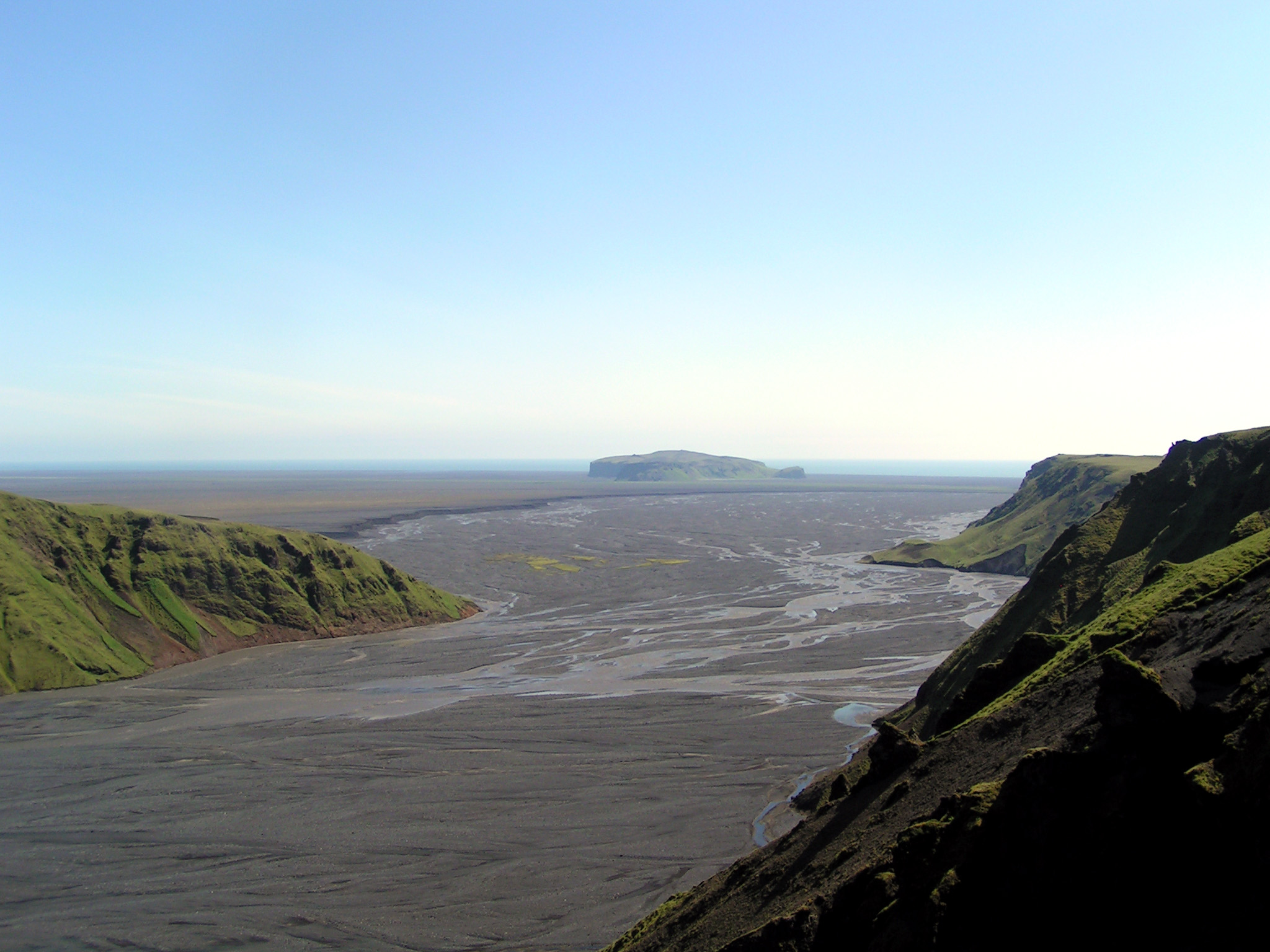
- A view of the Múlakvísl, looking towards Hjörleifshöfði in the background and the Atlantic Ocean

Location
- Country: Iceland
- Region: Southern Region

Physical characteristics
- Source
  - location: Mýrdalsjökull
  - coordinates: 63.6306°N 19.8834°W
- Mouth
  - location: Between Vík í Mýrdal and Mýrdalssandur
  - coordinates: 63.4°N 18.8834°W

Basin features
- River system: Múlakvísl

The Múlakvísl (Icelandic pronunciation: [ˈmuːlaˌkʰvistl̥]) is a river in the south of Iceland on the western side of Mýrdalssandur.

== Glacier flow ==
The river has a glacier flow which draws its water from the Mýrdalsjökull, mainly through the glacier tongue Kötlujökull. The river's floods are usually of gray-brown color, since it carries much sediment with it.

At Selfjall, about 10 km (6.2 mi) east of the village Vík í Mýrdal, the Ring Road goes across a bridge over the Múlakvísl.

== Jökulhlaups ==
As increasing water levels of this river are an important indicator of Katla's upcoming volcanic eruptions, it is closely monitored.

=== 1955 ===
A predecessor of the present bridge was demolished in 1955, during a jökulhlaup with 2,500 m^{3}/s of water. A fissure formed on Katla in 1918 in the caldera of the volcano, and a kettle had formed upon the glacier. This showed volcanic activities under the glacier, which in turn initiated the jökulhlaup. However, there was no real outbreak in 1955.

=== July 2011 ===
On 9 July 2011, another jökulhlaup occurred, which was already anticipated hours and days before because of a series of quakes at up to 10 km (6.2 mi) depth in the Katla region. There was a small volcanic eruption under the glacier similar to 1955. A jökulhlaup again destroyed the Ring Road bridge of the Múlakvísl, which was only 20 years old. A water level early warning system prompted the closing of the bridge and surrounding area, and no one was harmed. By 11 July 2011, the tremor under Katla had calmed down again. On 15 July 2011, 1,500 people were transported via the Múlakvísl by means of special vehicles. On 16 July, a temporary bridge was put into operation on the river.

== See also ==
List of rivers of Iceland
