= Laki =

Volcanic fissure in Iceland

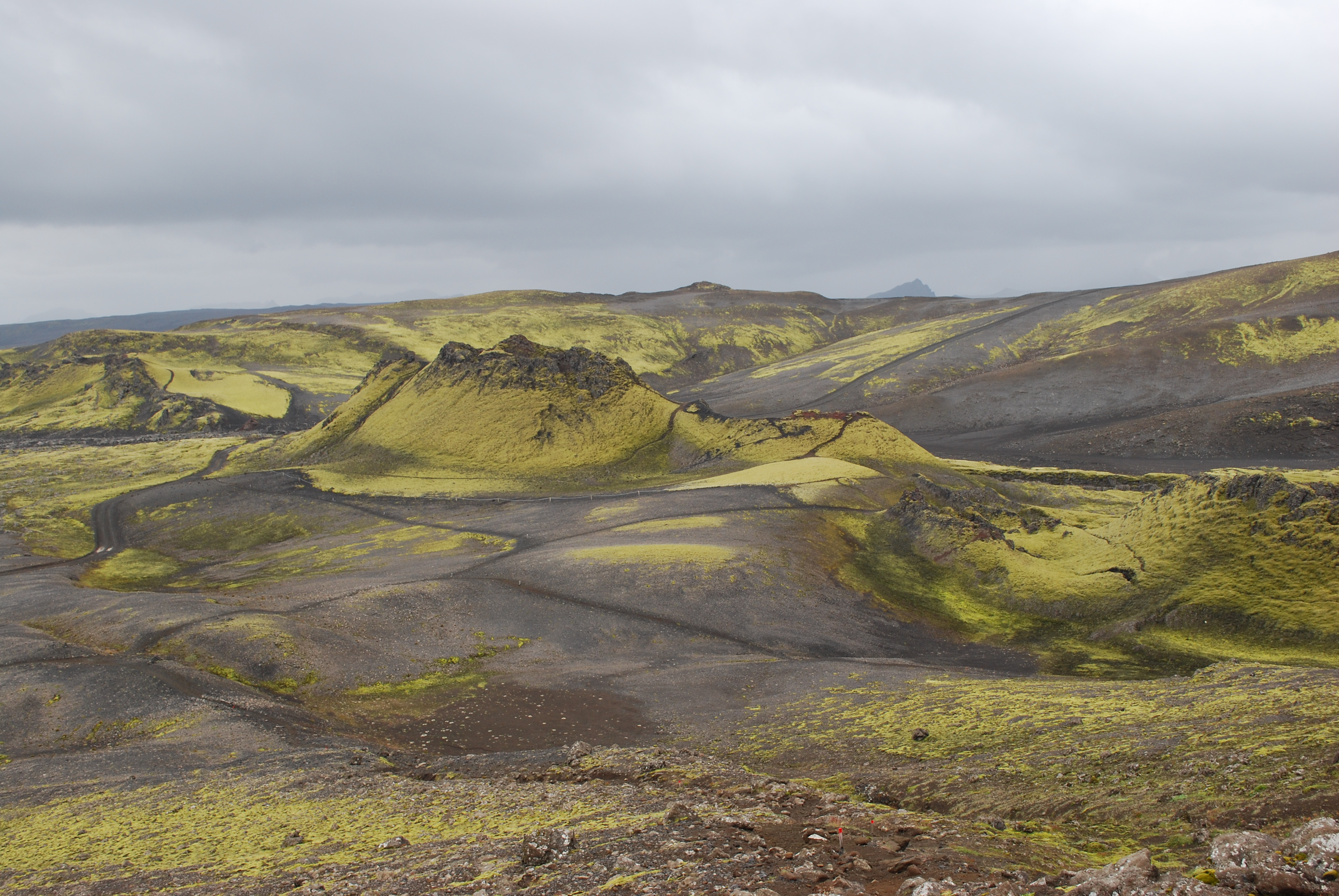

Highest point
- Elevation: Varies: canyon to 1,725 m (5,659 ft)
- Coordinates: 64°03′53″N 18°13′34″W

Geography
- Location within Iceland
- Geological features near the Grímsvötn fissure swarm with Laki surface lava flows. Other legend: Grímsvötn fissure swarm; calderas; central volcano area; fissure swarms; subglacial terrain above1,100 m (3,600 ft); seismically active areas; Clicking on the rectangle icon enables full window and mouse-over with more detail.
- Location: Iceland

Geology
- Mountain type: Fissure vents
- Last eruption: 1784

Laki (Icelandic pronunciation: [ˈlaːcɪ]) or Lakagígar ([ˈlaːkaˌciːɣar̥], Craters of Laki) is a volcanic fissure in the western part of Vatnajökull National Park, Iceland, not far from the volcanic fissure of Eldgjá and the small village of Kirkjubæjarklaustur. The fissure is properly referred to as Lakagígar, while Laki is a mountain that the fissure bisects. Lakagígar is part of a volcanic system centered on the volcano Grímsvötn, including the volcano Þórðarhyrna. It lies between the glaciers of Mýrdalsjökull and Vatnajökull, in an area of fissures that run in a southwest to northeast direction.

The system erupted violently over an eight-month period between June 1783 and February 1784 from the Laki fissure and the adjoining volcano Grímsvötn. It poured out an estimated 42 billion tonnes or 14 km^{3} (18×10^{9} cu yd) of basalt lava, as well as clouds of poisonous hydrofluoric acid and sulfur dioxide compounds that contaminated the soil, leading to the death of over 50% of Iceland's livestock population and the destruction of the vast majority of all crops. This led to a famine, which then killed at least a fifth of the island's human population, although some have claimed a quarter.

The Laki eruption and its aftermath caused a drop in global temperatures, as 120 million tonnes of sulfur dioxide were spewed into the Northern Hemisphere. This caused crop failures in Europe and may have caused droughts in North Africa and India.

== 1783 eruption ==
1783 eruption of Laki
- Start date: 8 June 1783
- End date: 7 February 1784
- Type: Phreatomagmatic, Strombolian, Hawaiian
- VEI: 4
- Impact: 9500 human, 190,500 sheep, 11,500 cattle and 28,000 horse deaths.

On 8 June 1783, a 25 km-long (15.5 mi) fissure of at least 130 vents opened with phreatomagmatic explosions because of the groundwater interacting with the rising basalt magma. Over a few days, the eruptions became less explosive, Strombolian, and later Hawaiian in character, with high rates of lava effusion. This event is rated as 4 on the volcanic explosivity index, but the eight-month emission of sulfuric aerosols resulted in one of the most important climatic and socially significant natural events of that millennium.

The eruption, also known as the Skaftáreldar [ˈskaftˌauːrˌɛltar̥] ("Skaftá fires") or Síðueldur [ˈsiːðʏˌɛltʏr̥] produced an estimated 14 km^{3} (18×10^{9} cu yd) of basalt lava, and the total volume of tephra emitted was 0.91 km^{3} (1.2×10^{9} cu yd). Lava fountains were estimated to have reached heights of 800 to 1,400 m (2,600 to 4,600 ft). The gases were carried by the convective eruption column to altitudes around 15 km (50,000 ft).

The eruption continued until 7 February 1784, but most of the lava was ejected in the first five months. One study states that the event "occurred as ten pulses of activity, each starting with a short-lived explosive phase followed by a long-lived period of fire-fountaining". Grímsvötn volcano, from which the Laki fissure extends, also erupted at the time, from 1783 until 1785. The outpouring of gases, including an estimated 8 million tonnes of fluorine and an estimated 120 million tonnes of sulfur dioxide, gave rise to what has since become known as the "Laki haze" across Europe.

=== Consequences in Iceland ===
The consequences for Iceland, known as the Móðuharðindin [ˈmouːðʏˌharðɪntɪn] (mist hardships), were disastrous. An estimated 20% of the population died in the famine after the fissure eruptions ensued, with about 8,000 excess deaths. About 80% of sheep (190,500 head), 50% of cattle (11,500 head), and 50% of horses (28,000 head) died because of dental and skeletal fluorosis from the 8 million tons of fluorine that were released. Milk yields halved. The livestock deaths were primarily caused by eating contaminated grass, while the humans' deaths were from the subsequent famine, not fluorine poisoning.

The parish minister and provost of Vestur-Skaftafellssýsla, Jón Steingrímsson (1728–1791), grew famous for the eldmessa [ˈɛltˌmɛsːa] ("fire mass") that he delivered on 20 July 1783. The church farm of Kirkjubæjarklaustur was endangered by a branch of the lava flow that halted not far from the farm, while the Rev. Jón and his parishioners were worshipping in the church. The spot at which the lava diverted away from the church became known thereafter as Eldmessutangi [ˈɛltˌmɛsːʏˌtʰauɲcɪ] ("Fire Mass Point").

This past week, and the two prior to it, more poison fell from the sky than words can describe: ash, volcanic hairs, rain full of sulfur and saltpeter, all of it mixed with sand. The snouts, nostrils, and feet of livestock grazing or walking on the grass turned bright yellow and raw. All water went tepid and light blue in color and gravel slides turned grey. All the earth's plants burned, withered, and turned grey, one after another, as the fire increased and neared the settlements.

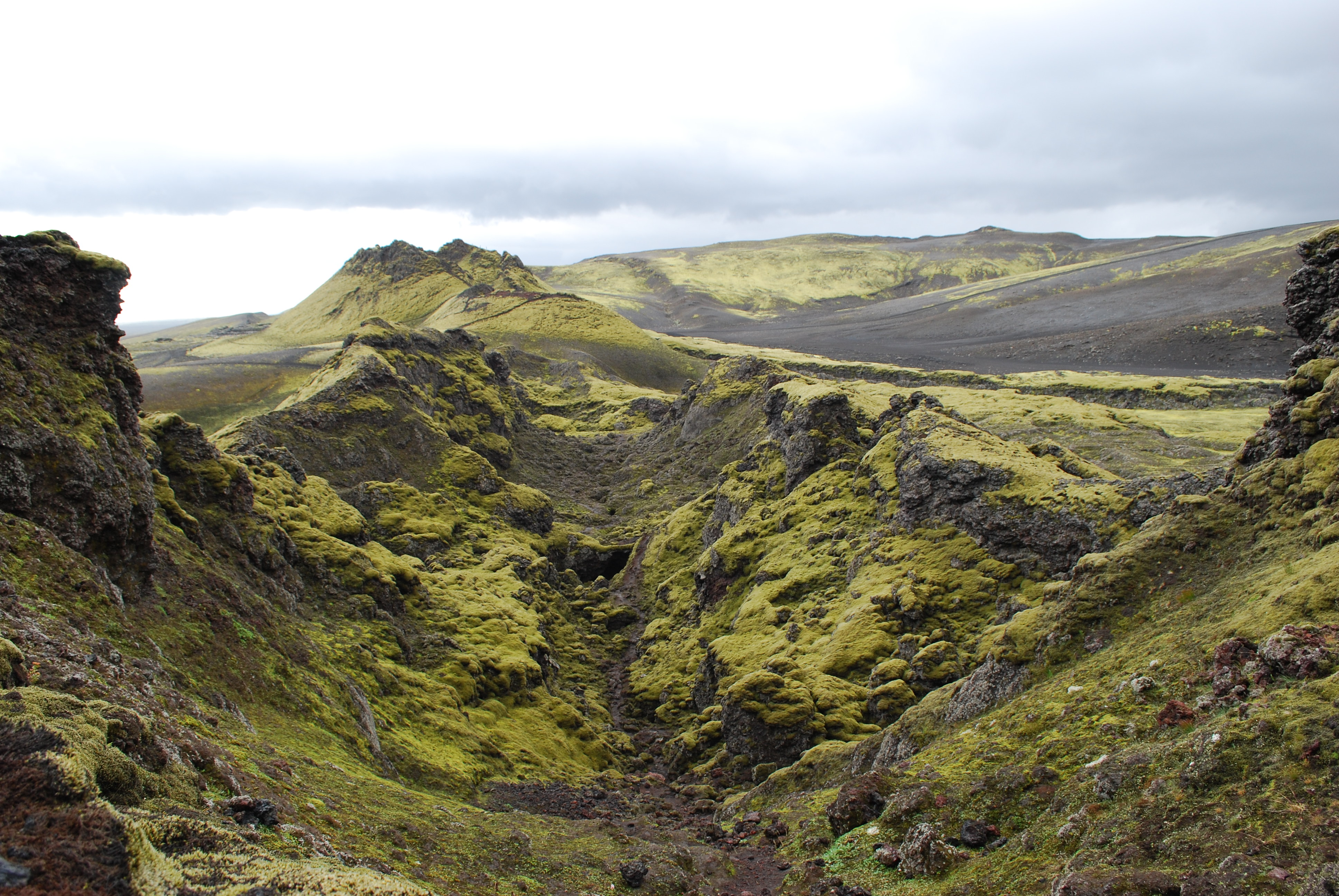
Center of the Laki fissure

=== Consequences in monsoon regions ===
Some evidence indicates that the Laki eruption weakened African and Indian monsoon circulations, leading to between 1 and 3 millimetres (0.04 and 0.12 in) less daily precipitation than normal over the Sahel of Africa, resulting in, among other effects, low flow in the River Nile. The resulting famine that afflicted Egypt in 1784 cost it roughly one-sixth of its population. The eruption was also found to have affected South Arabia and the already ongoing Chalisa famine in India.

=== Consequences in East Asia ===
The Great Tenmei famine of 1782–1788 in Japan may have been worsened by the Laki eruption. In the same year, Mount Asama erupted in Japan (Tenmei eruption). The eruption may have affected a drought in eastern China.

=== Consequences in Europe ===
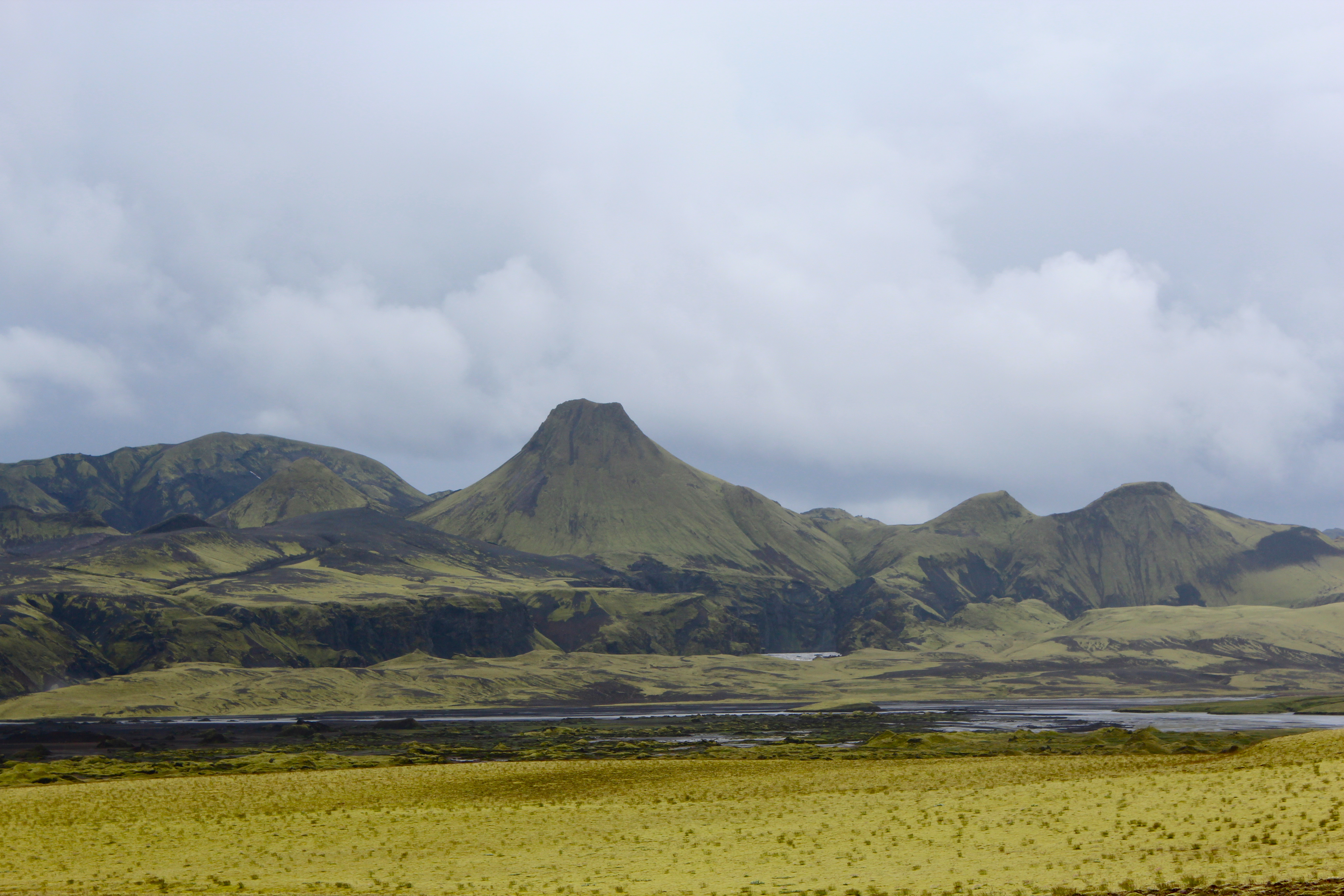
Laki in July 2012

An estimated 120,000,000 tonnes of sulfur dioxide were emitted, about three times the total annual European industrial output in 2006 (but delivered to higher altitudes, hence its persistence), and equivalent to six times the total 1991 Mount Pinatubo eruption. This outpouring of sulfur dioxide during unusual weather conditions caused a thick haze to spread across western Europe, resulting in many thousands of deaths throughout the remainder of 1783 and the winter of 1784.

The summer of 1783 was the hottest on record and a rare high-pressure zone over Iceland caused the winds to blow to the south-east. The poisonous cloud drifted to Bergen in Denmark–Norway, then spread to Prague in the Kingdom of Bohemia (now the Czech Republic) by 17 June, Berlin by 18 June, Paris by 20 June, Le Havre by 22 June, and Great Britain by 23 June. The fog was so thick that ships stayed in port, unable to navigate, and the sun was described as "blood coloured".

Inhaling sulfur dioxide gas causes victims to choke as their internal soft tissues swell – the gas reacts with the moisture in the lungs and produces sulfurous acid. The local death rate in Chartres was up by 5% during August and September, with more than 40 dead. In Great Britain, the east of England was most affected. The records show that the additional deaths were among outdoor workers; the death rate in Bedfordshire, Lincolnshire, and the east coast was perhaps two or three times the normal rate. An estimated 23,000 British people died from the poisoning.

The weather became very hot, causing severe thunderstorms with large hailstones that were reported to have killed cattle, until the haze dissipated in the autumn. The winter of 1783–1784 was very severe; naturalist Gilbert White in Selborne, Hampshire, reported 28 days of continuous frost. The extreme winter is estimated to have caused 8,000 additional deaths in the UK. During the spring thaw, Germany and Central Europe reported severe flood damage. This is considered part of a volcanic winter.

The meteorological impact of Laki continued, contributing significantly to several years of extreme weather in Europe. In France, the sequence of extreme weather events included a failed harvest in 1785 that caused poverty for rural workers, as well as droughts and bad winters and summers. These events contributed significantly to an increase in poverty and famine that may have contributed to the French Revolution in 1789. Laki was only one factor in a decade of climatic disruption, as Grímsvötn was erupting from 1783 to 1785, and an unusually strong El Niño may have been in effect from 1789 to 1793.

=== Consequences in North America ===
In North America, the winter of 1784 was the longest and one of the coldest on record. It was the longest period of below-zero temperatures in New England, with the largest accumulation of snow in New Jersey, and the longest freezing over of Chesapeake Bay. At the time, the capital of the United States was situated on the Chesapeake at Annapolis, Maryland; the weather delayed congressmen who were traveling there to vote for the Treaty of Paris, which formally ended the American Revolutionary War. A huge snowstorm hit the South; the Mississippi River froze at New Orleans, and ice floes were reported in the Gulf of Mexico.

=== Contemporaneous reports ===
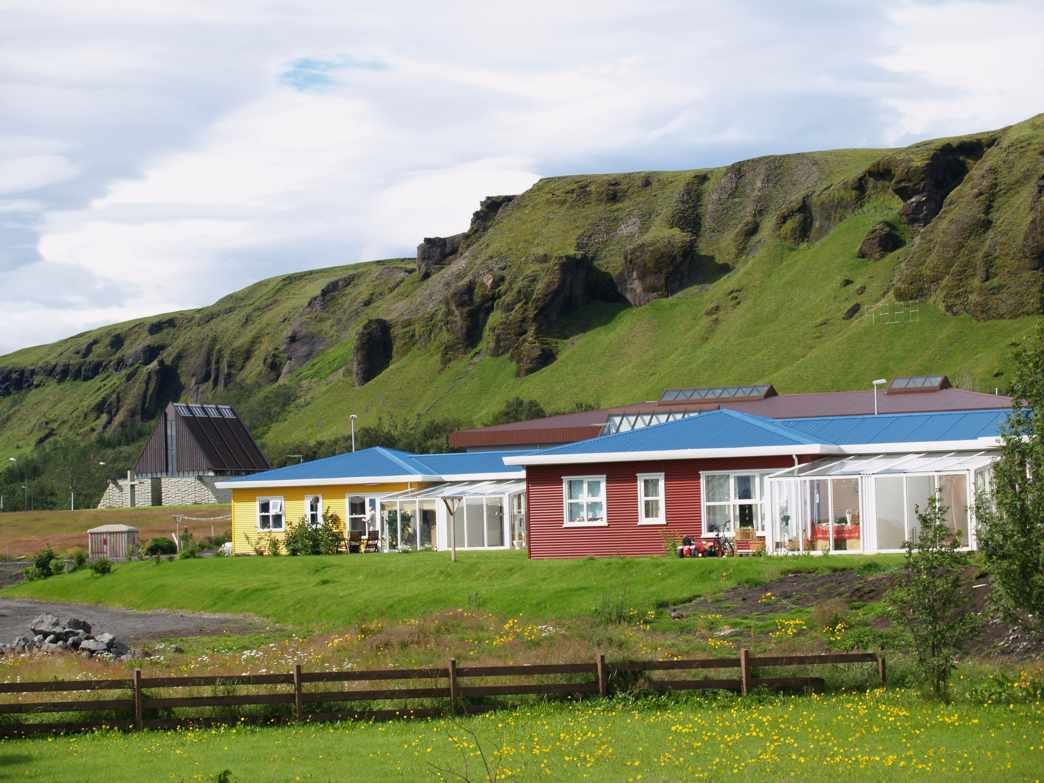
Kirkjubaejarklaustur, an important church farm in South Iceland, was the home of the Rev. Jón Steingrímsson (1728–1791), who left contemporary eyewitness accounts of the effects of the eruption and its aftermath. Today, Kirkjubæjarklaustur is a small village.

Gilbert White recorded his perceptions of the event at Selborne, Hampshire, England:

The summer of the year 1783 was an amazing and portentous one, and full of horrible phaenomena; for besides the alarming meteors and tremendous thunder-storms that affrighted and distressed the different counties of this kingdom, the peculiar haze, or smokey fog, that prevailed for many weeks in this island, and in every part of Europe, and even beyond its limits, was a most extraordinary appearance, unlike anything known within the memory of man. By my journal I find that I had noticed this strange occurrence from June 23 to July 20 inclusive, during which period the wind varied to every quarter without making any alteration in the air. The sun, at noon, looked as blank as a clouded moon, and shed a rust-coloured ferruginous light on the ground, and floors of rooms, but was particularly lurid and blood-coloured at rising and setting. All the time the heat was so intense that butchers' meat could hardly be eaten on the day after it was killed; and the flies swarmed so in the lanes and hedges that they rendered the horses half frantic, and riding irksome. The country people began to look, with a superstitious awe, at the red, louring aspect of the sun; ...

Benjamin Franklin recorded his observations in America in a 1784 lecture:

During several of the summer months of the year 1783, when the effect of the sun's rays to heat the earth in these northern regions should have been greater, there existed a constant fog over all Europe, and a great part of North America. This fog was of a permanent nature; it was dry, and the rays of the sun seemed to have little effect towards dissipating it, as they easily do a moist fog, arising from water. They were indeed rendered so faint in passing through it, that when collected in the focus of a burning glass they would scarce kindle brown paper. Of course, their summer effect in heating the Earth was exceedingly diminished. Hence the surface was early frozen. Hence the first snows remained on it unmelted, and received continual additions. Hence the air was more chilled, and the winds more severely cold. Hence perhaps the winter of 1783–84 was more severe than any that had happened for many years. The cause of this universal fog is not yet ascertained ... or whether it was the vast quantity of smoke, long continuing, to issue during the summer from Hekla in Iceland, and that other volcano which arose out of the sea near that island, which smoke might be spread by various winds, over the northern part of the world, is yet uncertain.

According to contemporary records, Hekla did not erupt in 1783; its previous eruption was in 1766. The Laki fissure eruption was 70 km (45 mi) east and the Grímsvötn volcano was erupting about 120 km (75 mi) northeast. Katla, only 50 km (31 mi) southeast, was still renowned after its spectacular eruption 28 years earlier in 1755.

Sir John Cullum of Bury St Edmunds, Suffolk, England, recorded his observations on 23 June 1783 (the same date on which Gilbert White noted the onset of the unusual atmospheric phenomena), in a letter to Sir Joseph Banks, then president of the Royal Society:

... about six o'clock, that morning, I observed the air very much condensed in my chamber-window; and, upon getting up, was informed by a tenant that finding himself cold in bed, about three o'clock in the morning, he looked out at his window, and to his great surprise saw the ground covered with a white frost: and I was assured that two men at Barton, about three miles (five kilometres) off, saw in some shallow tubs, ice of the thickness of a crown-piece.

Sir John goes on to describe the effect of this "frost" on trees and crops:

The aristae of the barley, which was coming into ear, became brown and withered at their extremities, as did the leaves of the oats; the rye had the appearance of being mildewed; so that the farmers were alarmed for those crops. The wheat was not much affected. The larch, Weymouth pine, and hardy Scotch fir, had the tips of their leaves withered.

== See also ==
- Geography of Iceland
- Glacial lake outburst flood
- Iceland hotspot
- List of glaciers of Iceland
- List of volcanic eruptions by death toll
- List of waterfalls of Iceland
- Plate tectonics
- Timeline of volcanism on Earth
- Volcanism of Iceland
  - List of volcanic eruptions in Iceland
  - List of volcanoes in Iceland
