= List of rivers of Iceland =

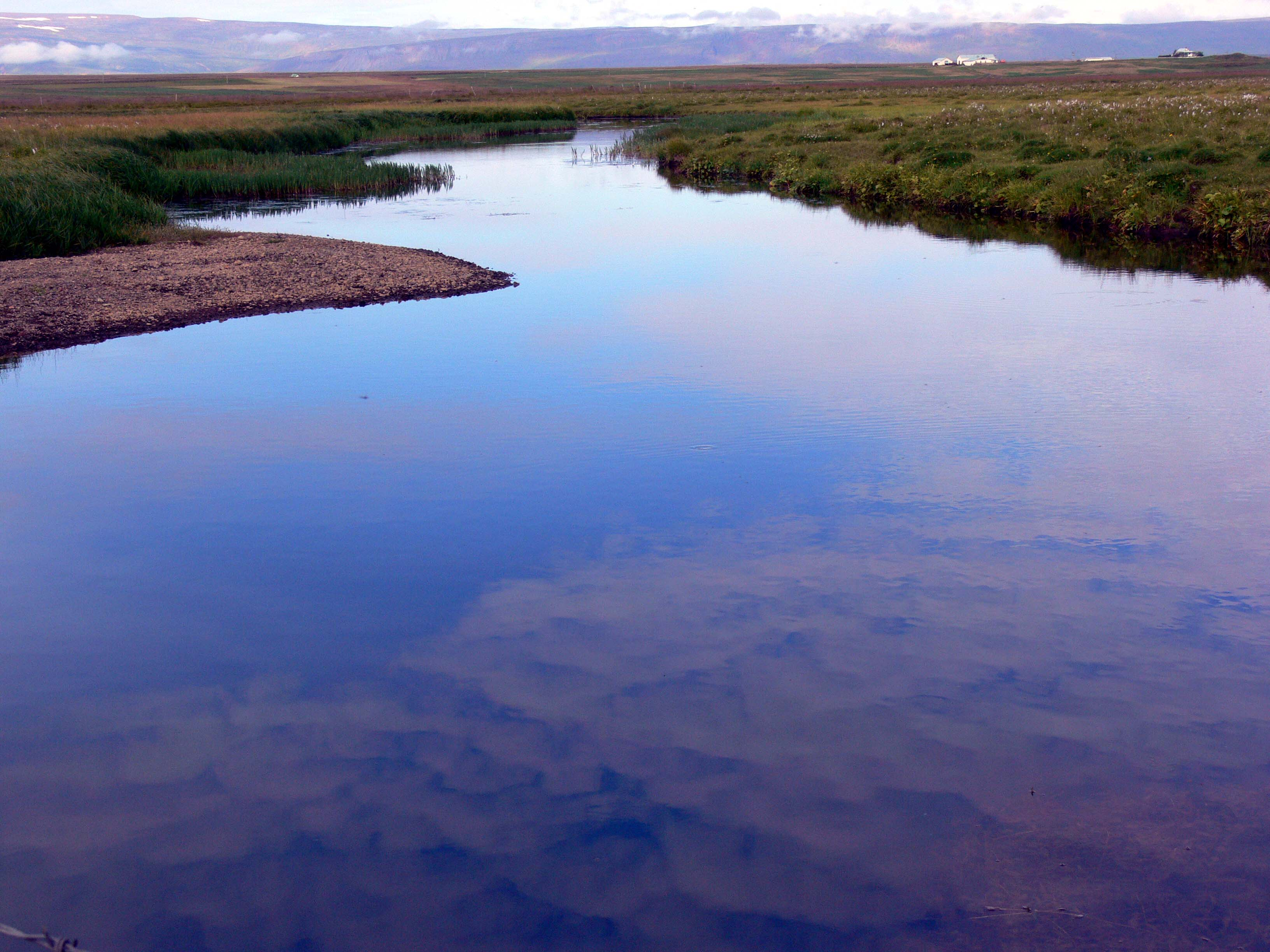
The Álfar

On an island like Iceland, the rivers are short in length. None of the rivers are important as a means of navigation due to the impracticality of settlements in the Highlands of Iceland where they originate.

The Icelandic word for "river" is "á" (auː), which appears as the final element of the compound word for many of the river names. Other common endings are "fljót" (also "river") and "vötn" ("waters"). Several rivers have the same name but are in different parts of the country. These are sometimes differentiated by including a regional name in the name of the river itself, for example "Jökulsá í Fljótsdal" (Icelandic "Jökulsá in Fljótsdalur"). In other cases it may be necessary to disambiguate parenthetically.

== South ==
- Hvítá (Árnessýsla)
- Krossá (Markarfljót)
- Kúðafljót
- Markarfljót
- Mustafl
- Ölfusá (the Icelandic river with the greatest flow)
- Rangá
- Skaftá
- Skeiðará
- Skógá
- Sog
- Þjórsá (the longest river in Iceland, 230 km)
- Tungnaá

== West ==
- Fossá
- Hvítá (Borgarfjörður)
- Kjarrá–Thervá
- Norðurá (Borgarfjörður)

== Westfjords ==
- Dynjandi
- Kolbeinsá
- Staðará

== North ==
- Blanda
- Eyjafjarðará
- Eystri Jökulsá
- Fnjóská
- Glerá
- Grafará
- Gönguskarðsá
- Heiðará
- Héraðsvötn
- Hjaltadalsá
- Hofsá (Skagafjörður)
- Hofsá (Vesturdalur)
- Hörgá
- Jökulsá á Fjöllum
- Kolka (Kolbeinsdalsá)
- Laxá
- Norðurá
- Sauðá
- Skjálfandafljót
- Svartá
- Sæmundará
- Vatnsdalsá

== East ==
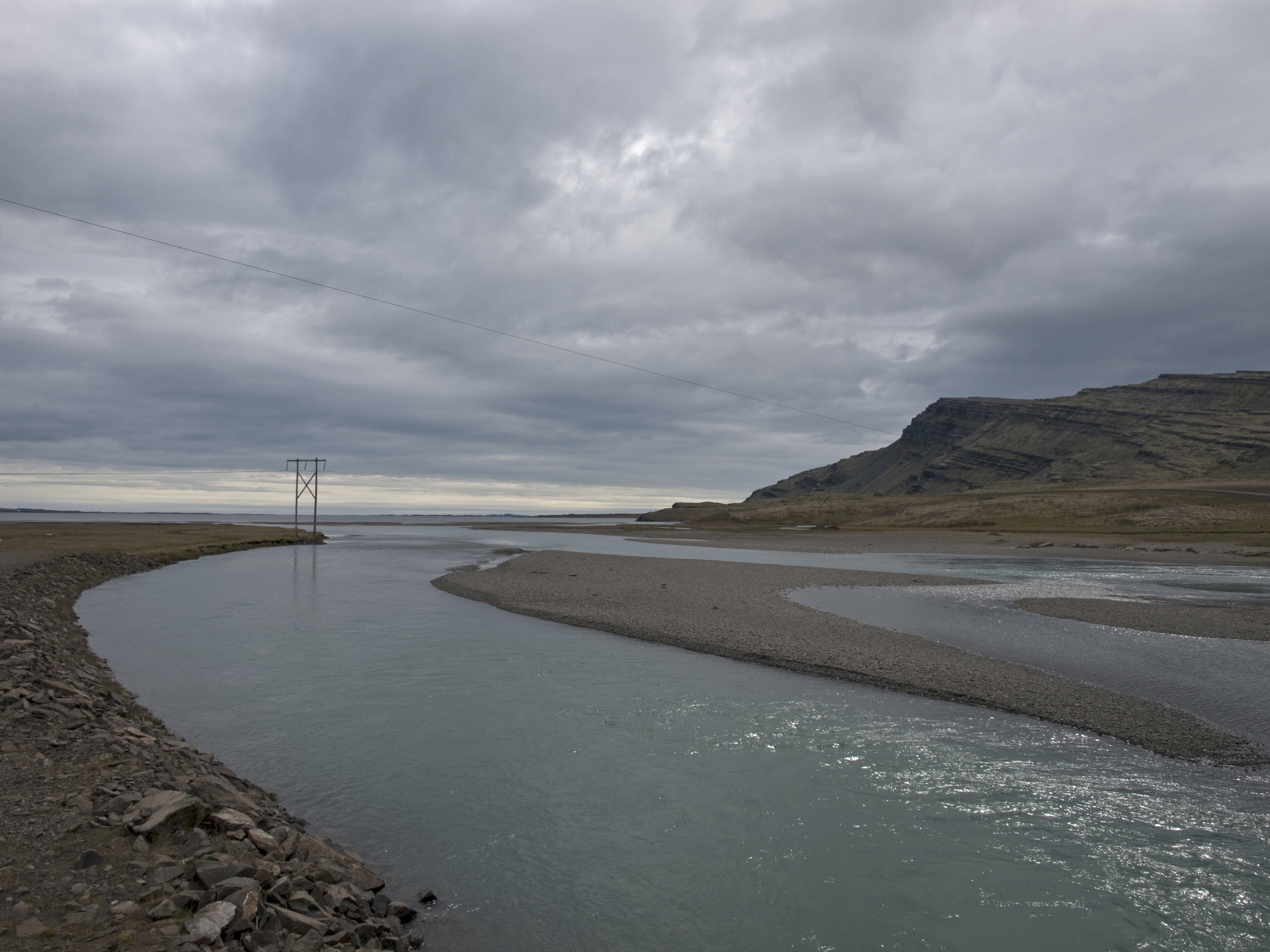
The mouth of the Hamarsá, Hamarsfjörður

- Hamarsá
- Hofsá
- Jökulsá á Dal
- Jökulsá í Fljótsdal
- Jökulsá í Lóni
- Lagarfljót
- Selfljót
