= Ice cauldron =

Glacial formation

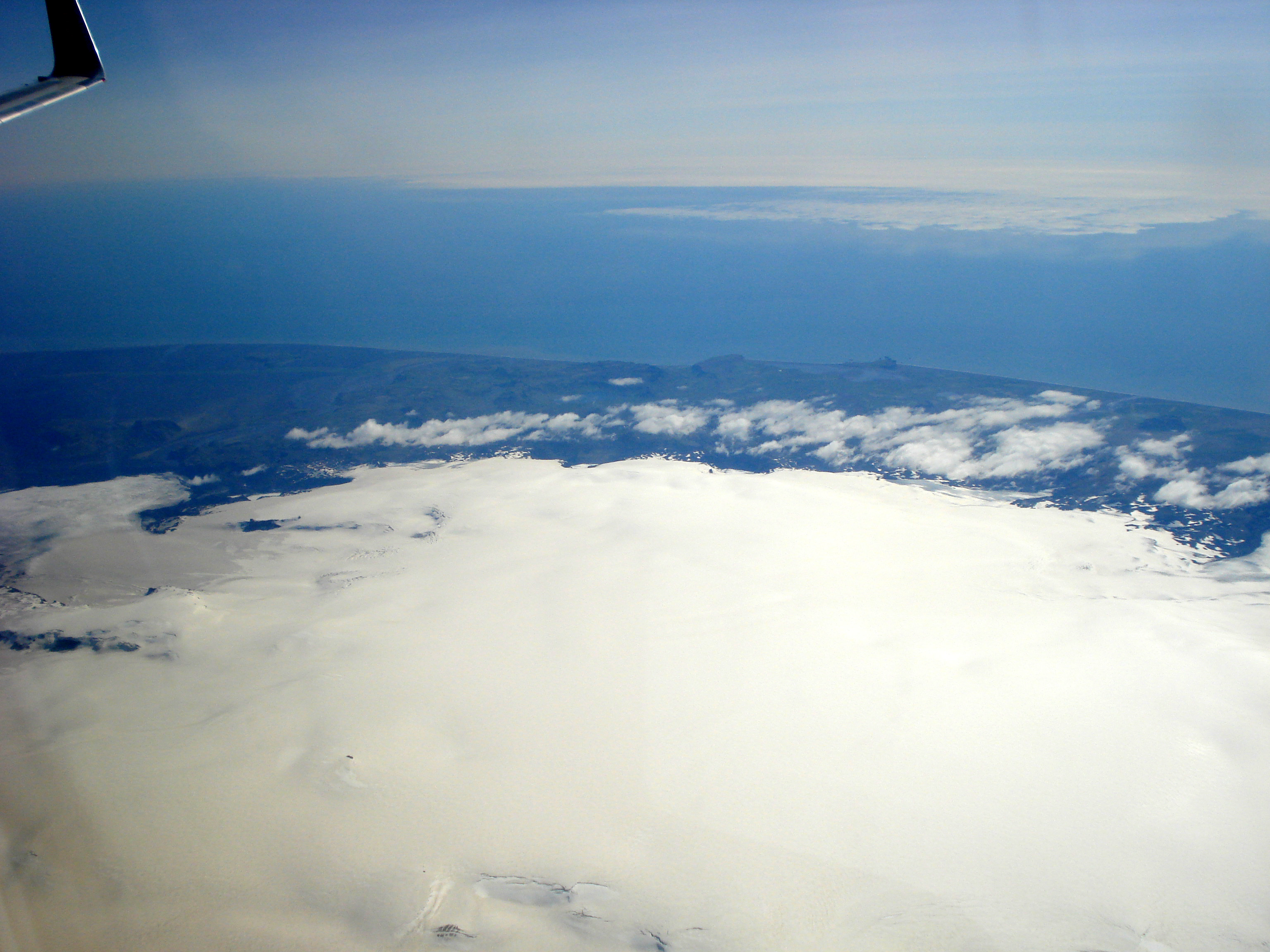
Ice cauldrons of Katla volcano, Mýrdalsjökull glacier in 2009

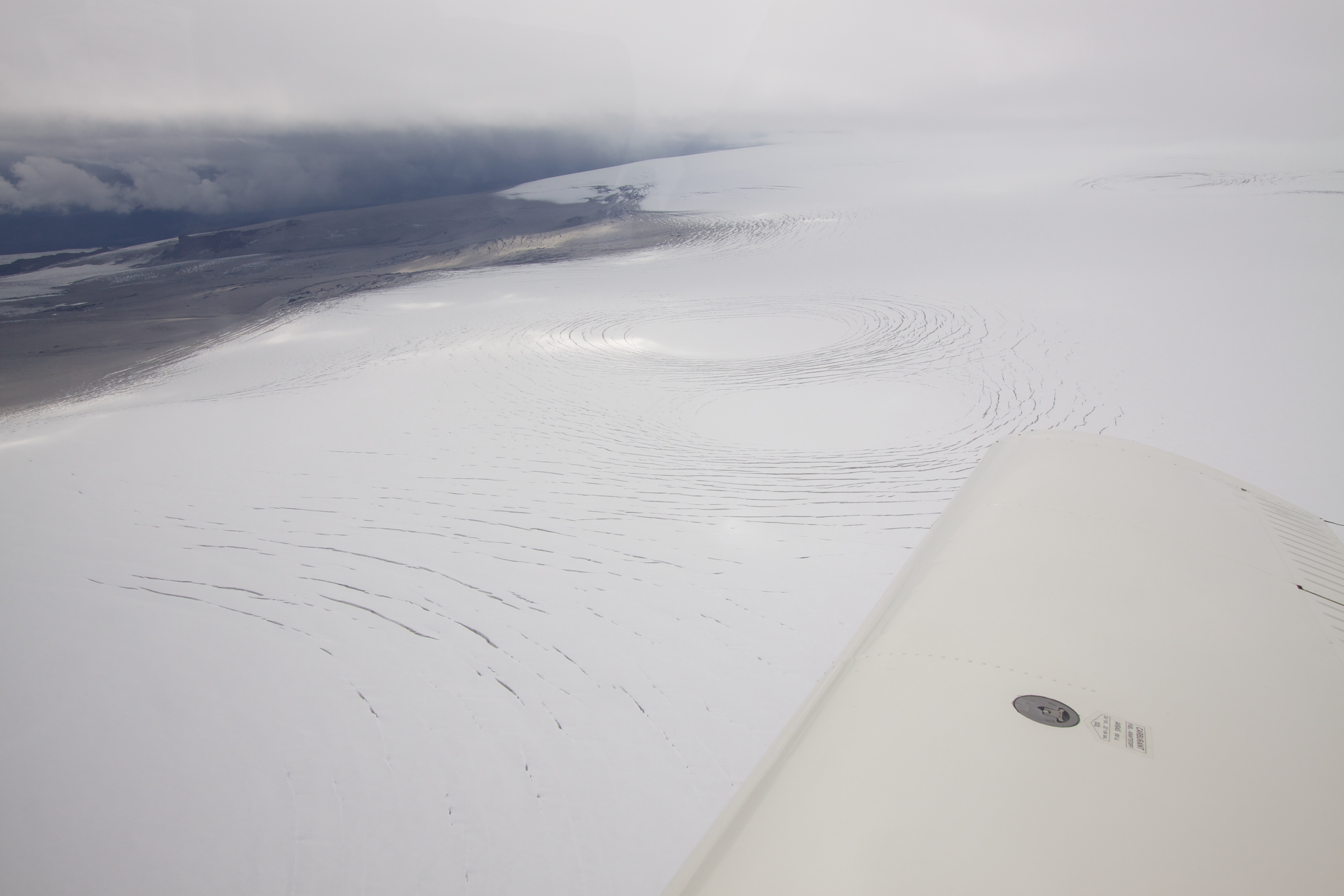
Newly formed ice cauldrons at Katla during unrest period in 2011

Ice cauldrons are ice formations within glaciers that cover some subglacial volcanoes. They can have circular to oblong forms. Their surface areas reach from some meters (as indentations or holes in the ice) to up to 1 or more kilometers (as bowl shaped depressions).

Their existence is connected to ice-volcano interaction in two possible ways: They can be formed in the course of a subglacial eruption or on top of a continuously active subglacial high temperature geothermal area.

In both cases, a jökulhlaup may be produced in connection with them.

== Formation and continued existence of ice cauldrons ==
=== Ice cauldrons and subglacial eruptions ===
When an eruption takes place under a bigger glacier, e.g. an ice cap, it normally begins with an effusive stage. The heat forms an ice cave and pillow lava is produced. After some time, the eruption has reached a stage where the pressure drops within the ice vault and the eruption style changes to become explosive. Hyaloclastite is produced and the heat is transferred to the meltwater. "At this stage, the surface ice begins to act brittle and creates concentric fractures that cave in towards the meltwater reservoir. This is referred to as the ice cauldron".

When the eruption continues, “the meltwater reservoir becomes so large that the ice cauldron collapses inward towards the edifice, exposing the meltwater reservoir and allowing the breach of both the reservoir and the explosive lava, releasing plumes of gasses and jets of hyaloclastites“. The ice cauldron can develop further into an ice canyon, as was the case during the 1996 Gjálp eruption. It can continue to exist after the meltwater has left the eruption site and the eruption is terminated. But in most cases, ice flow will fill up the ice cauldron again and make it disappear as soon as the eruption products have cooled down enough.

=== Ice cauldrons on top of subglacial geothermal areas ===
Another case are ice cauldrons situated on top of geothermal areas. "(…) hydrothermal systems are created that bring heat up from a magma body, continuously melting ice into water that may be stored at the glacier bed until it breaks out in jökulhlaups".

Many examples for a decades long existence of such ice cauldrons are to be found in Iceland.

== Ice cauldrons around the world ==
=== Examples from Iceland ===
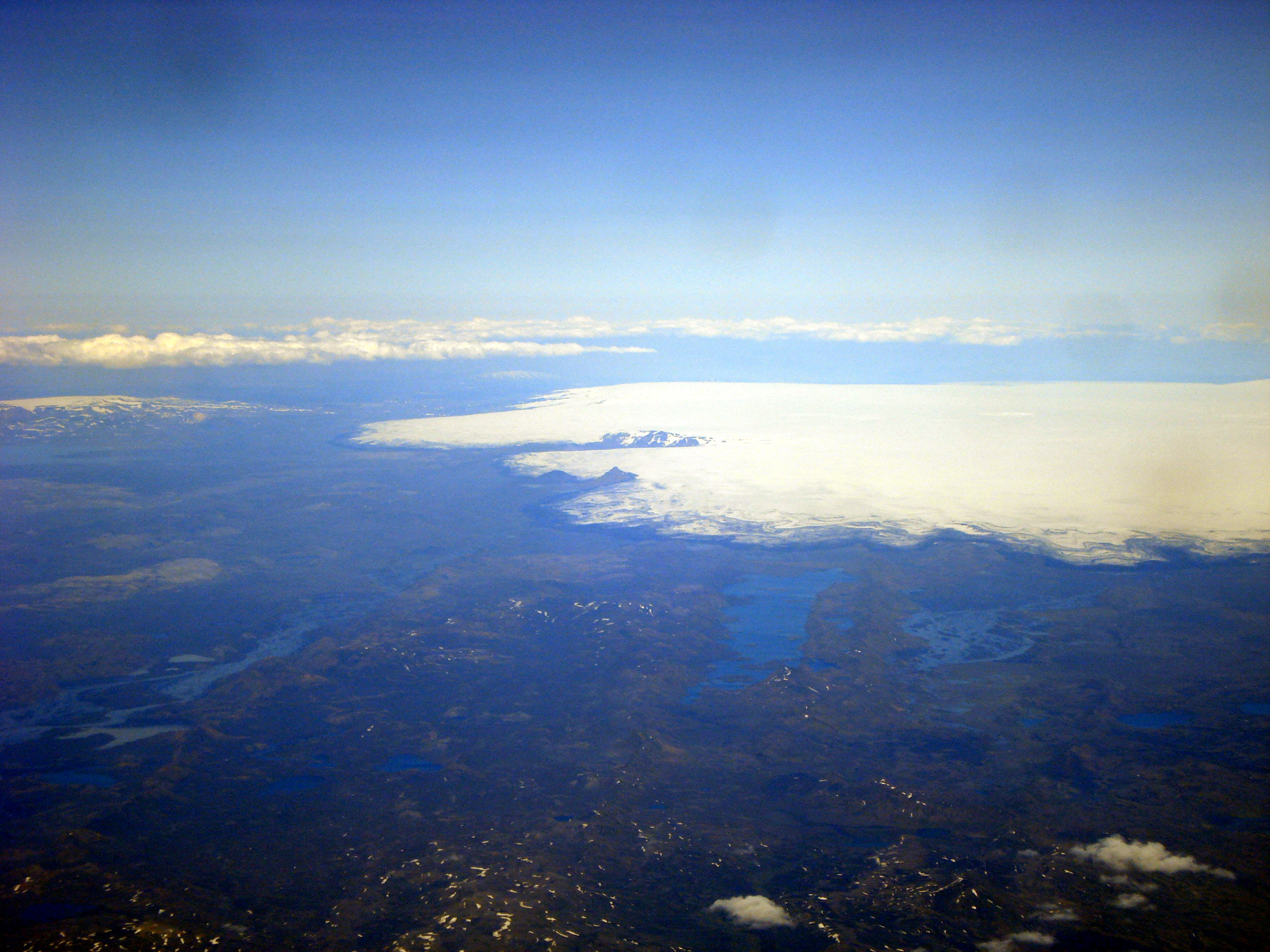
Aerial view of Vatnajökull. Skaftá cauldrons as slight identations to the east of Hamarinn.

==== Skaftárkatlar (Skaftá cauldrons) ====
These are two depressions in the ice cover above two subglacial lakes in the south-western part of Vatnajökull. (Note: For a map see) In the whole, many cauldrons are to be found within Vatnajökull glacier (8,100 km^{2} (3,100 sq mi) in 2015), the largest of which in the western part of the ice cap are the Skaftá cauldrons.

These ice cauldrons "are created by melting at subglacial geothermal areas". The meltwater accumulates in lakes "under the cauldrons until it drains every 2–3 years in a jökulhlaup" of normally up to 2,000 m^{3}/s (71,000 cu ft/s).

An unusually big outburst flood (jökulhlaup) was recorded in 2015. The eastern Skaftá cauldron had accumulated meltwater in this case during around 5 years. It was discharged down the Skaftá river in September 2015 with a peak of 3,000 m^{3}/s (110,000 cu ft/s) or even more. The cauldron then partially collapsed and formed a depression of up to 110 m (360 ft) deep in its center and a maximum width of 2.7 km (1.7 mi)

==== Katla ====
Ice cauldrons on the Mýrdalsjökull ice cap of Katla.

Famous examples from Iceland are the ice cauldrons within the Katla caldera.

Katla is an important caldera and central volcano situated under the Mýrdalsjökull glacier cap in the southern part of Iceland's East Volcanic Zone. 150–200 eruptions during Holocene have been attributed to Katla, and 17 of these happened since Settlement of Iceland in the 8th century. Most of the eruptions had their origin in the ice covered caldera. The last large eruption took place in 1918 and was associated with a jökulhlaup with an estimated peak discharge of about 300,000 m^{3}/s (11,000,000 cu ft/s).

Within the caldera 12–17 ice cauldrons are supra- and inglacial manifestations of a near-surface magmatic storage system. K. Scharrer explains that "twenty permanent and 4 semi-permanent ice cauldrons could be identified on the surface of Mýrdalsjökull indicating geothermally active areas in the underlying caldera". Others have also documented the change with time of ice cauldrons at Katla.

They have a depth of 10–40 m (33–131 ft) and a width of 0.6–1.6 km (0.37–0.99 mi). In 1955, 1999 and 2011 small to medium-sized jökulhlaup originated from some new ice cauldrons. It is still subject of discussion if they were eruption caused or initiated by heating of the geothermal areas under these cauldrons. "The geothermal heat output is in the order of a few hundred megawatt".

=== Ice cauldrons in other environments ===
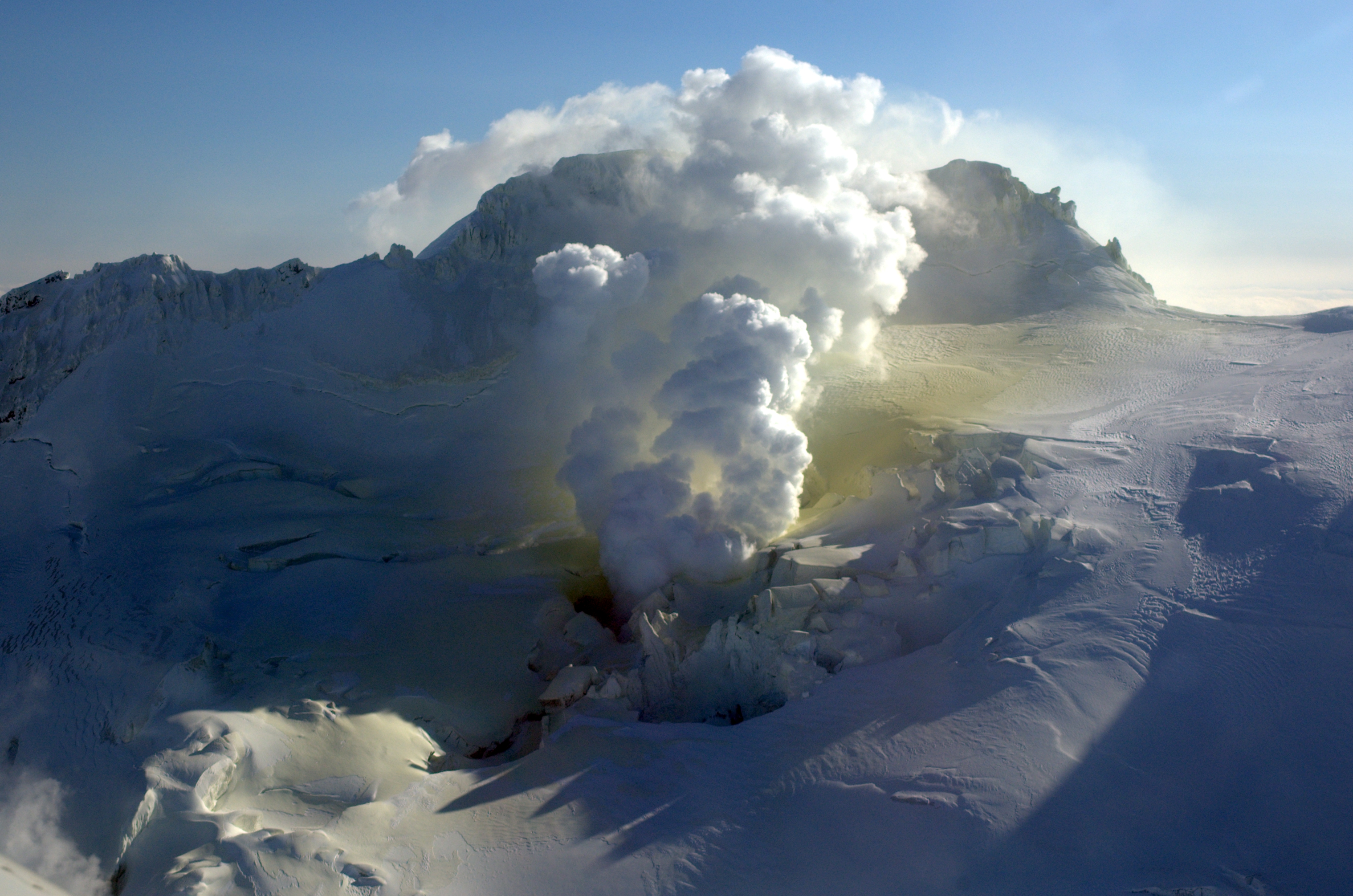
Fourpeaked Mountain, Alaska

Ice cauldrons of course do not form only in Iceland, but also at many other places where there is subglacial volcanic activity, e.g. in Alaska (Mount Redoubt, Mount Spurr).

== Ice cauldrons and volcano monitoring ==
As deepening and widening of the ice cauldrons at Katla volcano, and especially in combination with increased seismic activity, are interpreted as signs of magma inflow, the cauldrons are closely monitored.

== See also ==
- Subglacial volcano
- Subglacial eruption
- Volcanism of Iceland
- 1996 eruption of Gjálp
