= Mýrdalssandur =

Outwash plain in Iceland

- Outwash plain
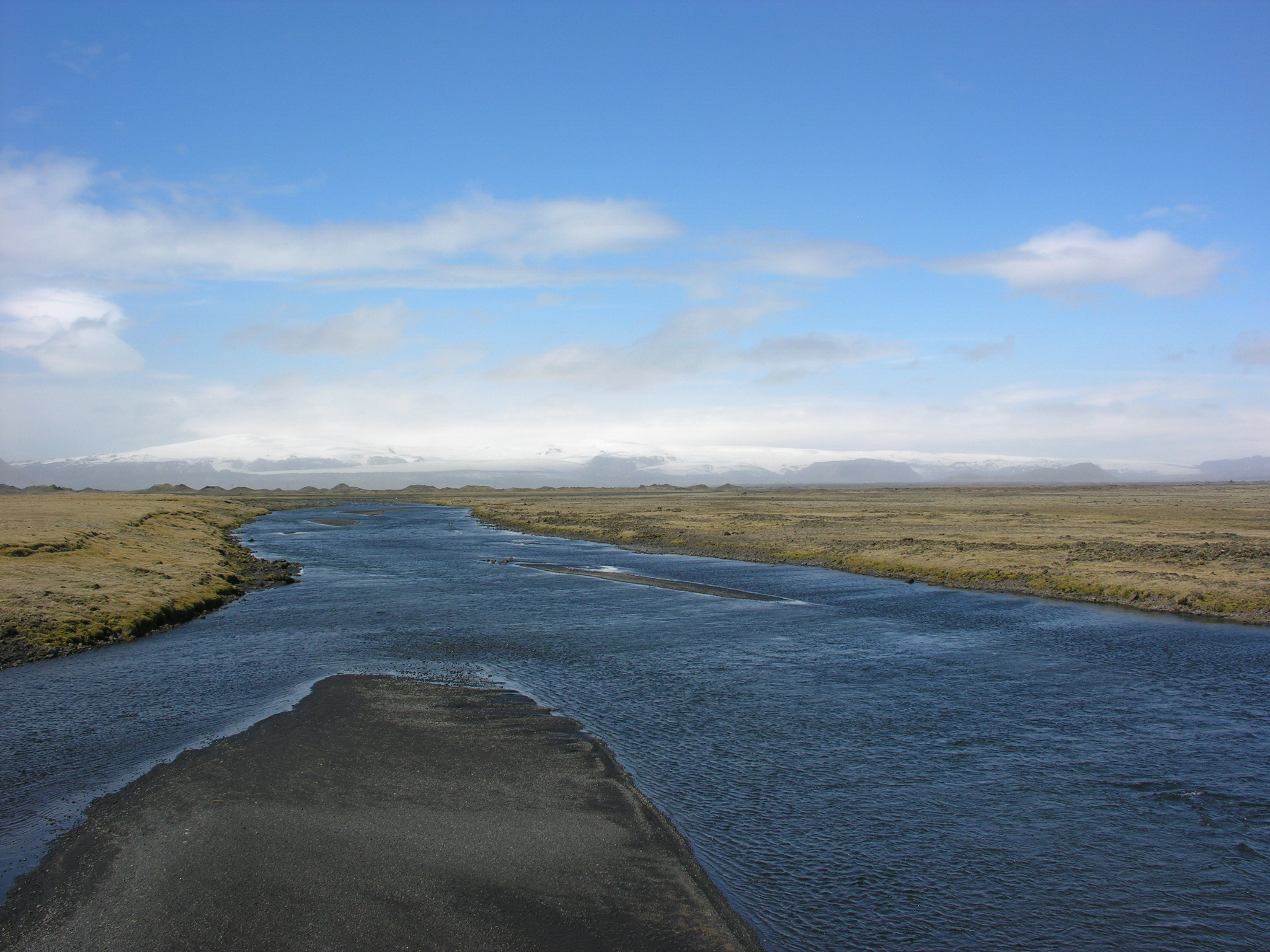
- At Kúðafljót, view of the Mýrdalsjökull

- Map of Iceland showing the location of Mýrdalssandur.
- Coordinates: 63.47°N 18.63°W
- Location: Vestur-Skaftafellssýsla, Southern Region, Iceland
- Topo map: Recent jökulhlaup flows to the Mýrdalssandur: 1:from Kötlujökull to Leirá in 1721, 1755, 1918; 2:from Kötlujökull to Austastikælir stream in 1612, 1625, 1660, 1721, 1755, 1823, 1860, 1918; 3:from Kötlujökull to Blautakvísl river area of Mýrdalssandur in (1625), 1660, 1755, 1823, 1918; 4:from Kötlujökull to Múlakvísl river area of Mýrdalssandur towards Kötlutangi and Höfðabrekkufjara beaches in 1612, 1625, 1660, 1721, 1755, 1823, 1860, 1918; 5:from Kötlujökull to Múlakvísl river area of Mýrdalssandur towards Höfðabrekkufjara beach in 1612, 1625, 1660, 1721, 1755, 1823, 1860, 1918, 1955, 1999, 2011, 2014, 2017; 6:from Múlakvísl river area towards Kerlingardalsfjara beach in 1660, 1721, 1755, 1823, 1860

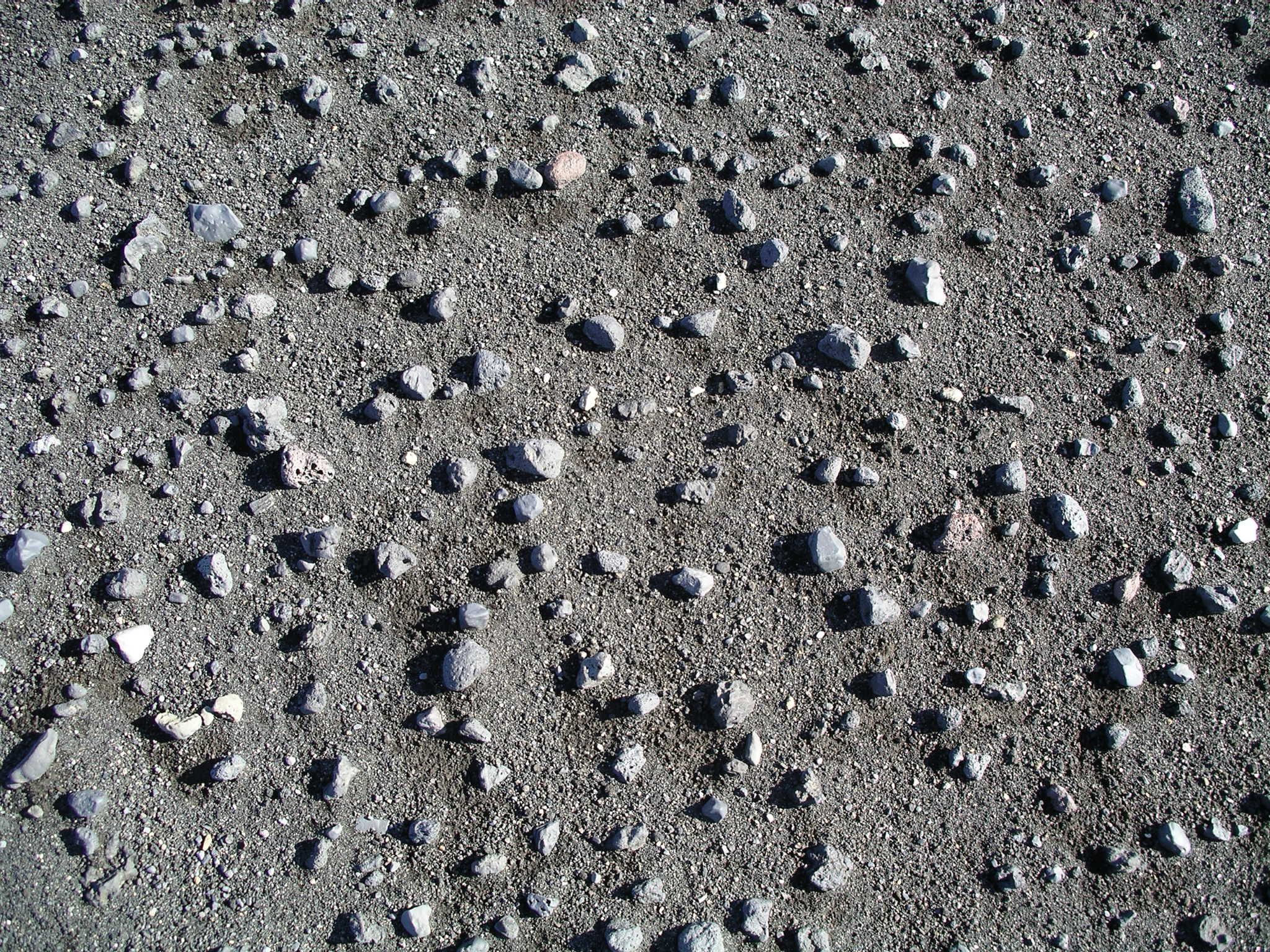
Mýrdalssandur: By moving the fine material, coarser rock material is separated (Deflation)

Mýrdalssandur (Icelandic: [ˈmirˌtalsˌsantʏr̥]) is an outwash plain on the south coast of Iceland.

== Location and description ==
The outwash plain is located between the rivers of Kúðafljót in the east and Múlakvísl in the west. Both rivers carry water from the Mýrdalsjökull glacier to the sea.

Mýrdalssandur has a 35 km (22 mi)-long coast line, including Kötlutangi [ˈkʰœhtlʏˌtʰauɲcɪ], the southernmost point of the island of Iceland.

The Ring Road crosses this flat surface on 25 km (16 mi).

== Development ==
The outwash plain was built by the numerous jökulhlaups of the Mýrdalsjökull. The last large jökulhlaup was due to an explosive eruption of the Katla volcano under the glacier in 1918, and the water volume at the peak of the jökulhlaup was estimated to be around 200,000 - 300,000 m³/s.

== History of settlements ==
South of the road rises Hjörleifshöfði to a height of 231 m (758 ft). The mountain is named after Hjörleifr Hróðmarsson. He was the first settler to come to Iceland with Ingólfr Arnarson.

In the Middle Ages there was a fishing lake called Kerlingarfjörður [ˈcʰɛ(r)tliŋkarˌfjœrðʏr̥] at the mouth of the Múlakvísl. Probably it was not a fjord, but rather an extension of a river mouth. The name (isl. Kerling = the old woman) was created according to the land register book, after an old woman had fallen overboard from one of the settler ships and was carried away by the water. Around the year 1000 many farms seem to have found themselves on the Mýrdalssandur. Sources mention four parishes in Álftaver [ˈaul̥taˌvɛːr̥]. These farms were, however, were mostly abandoned up to the 15th century, as a result of volcanic eruptions of the Katla, subsequent glacier runs and ashfall. At the beginning of the 21st century, some farms still exist in Álftaver.

== Þykkvabær Monastery ==
In 1168 a monks' monastery of the Augustinians was founded in the Þykkvabær í Veri [ˈθɪhkvaˌpaiːr iː ˈvɛːrɪ] on the Mýrdalssandur. The name was then changed to Þykkvabæjarklaustur [ˈθɪhkvaˌpaiːjarˌkʰlœystʏr̥] and the first abbot there was Saint Thorlak. He was later bishop in Skálholt and some of his successors were either bishops there or in Hólar.

In 1550, with the Reformation, the King of Denmark took over the monastery with all its possessions. The monastery was dissolved, but it still existed for a long time as a rich farm until it was finally abandoned in 1945.

== In popular culture ==
The area was used as a filming location for the Star Wars spinoff film Rogue One, representing the planet Lah'mu in the opening scenes of the film.

== See also ==
- List of extreme points of Iceland
- Geography of Iceland
- List of volcanoes in Iceland
