= Kjarrá–Thervá River =

Salmon fishing destination in Iceland

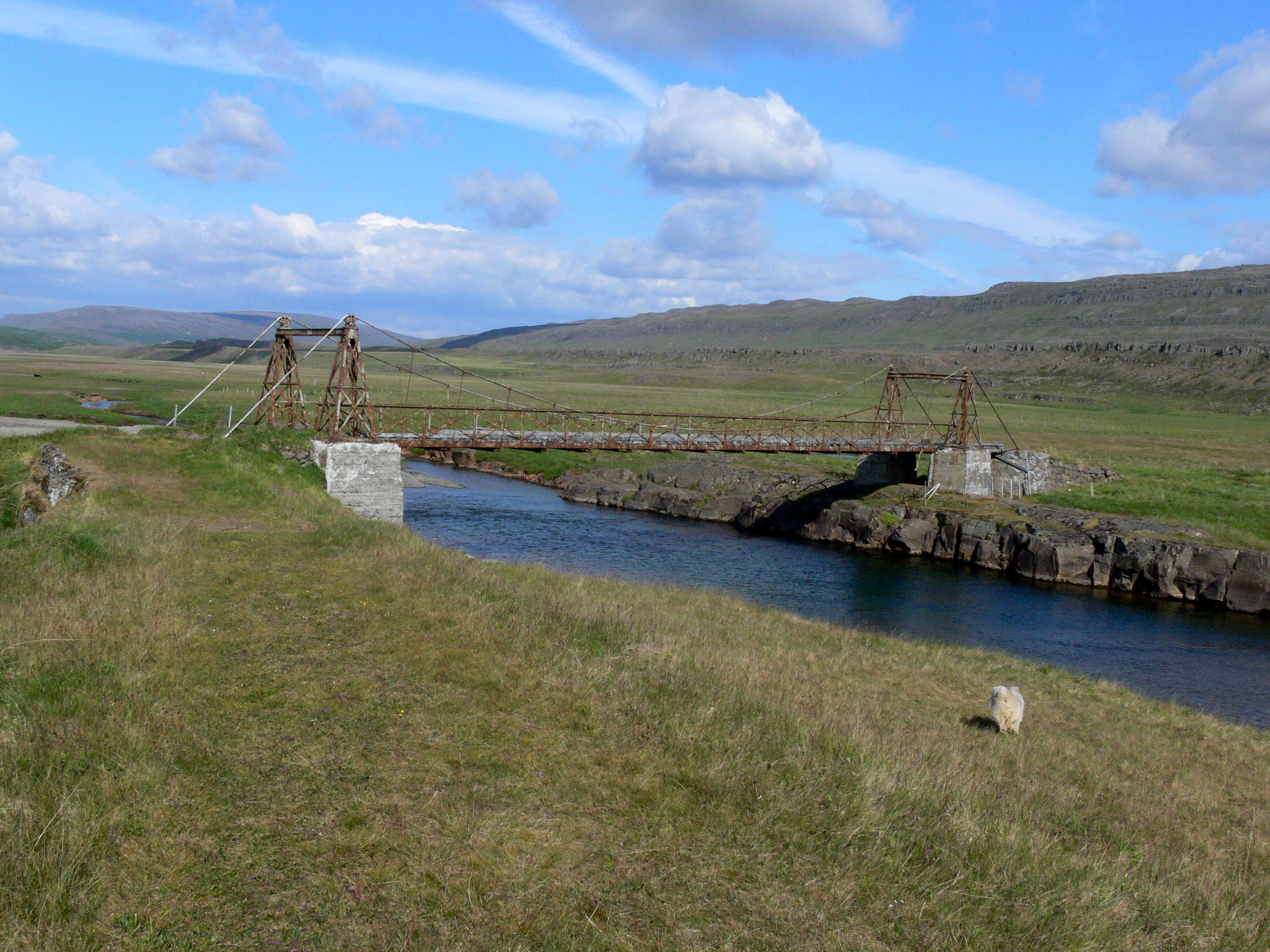
Thervá river crossing

The Kjarará–Þverá Rivers, located about 115 kilometers from Reykjavík in western Iceland, is a 64-kilometer glacial river known for its salmon fishing.

The upper river, closer to the glacier, is Kjarará (often named Kjarrá); the in-between is Örnólfsdalsá; the lower river, closer to the sea and "below the fence above Örnólfsdal," is Thverá (Icelandic: Þverá).

Kjarará is a tributary of the glacial river Hvítá (Icelandic: Tvídægra), and has tributaries of its own: Litla-Thverá, Krókavatnsá, and Lambá. The river is part of the Borgarfjörður ecosystem.

Kjarrá and Þverá each have their own fishing lodge, "limited to seven rods each."

64.6915°N 21.0715°E

== See also ==
- Hraunfossar, waterfalls upriver
