= Vík í Mýrdal =

Vík í Mýrdal Vík
- Town
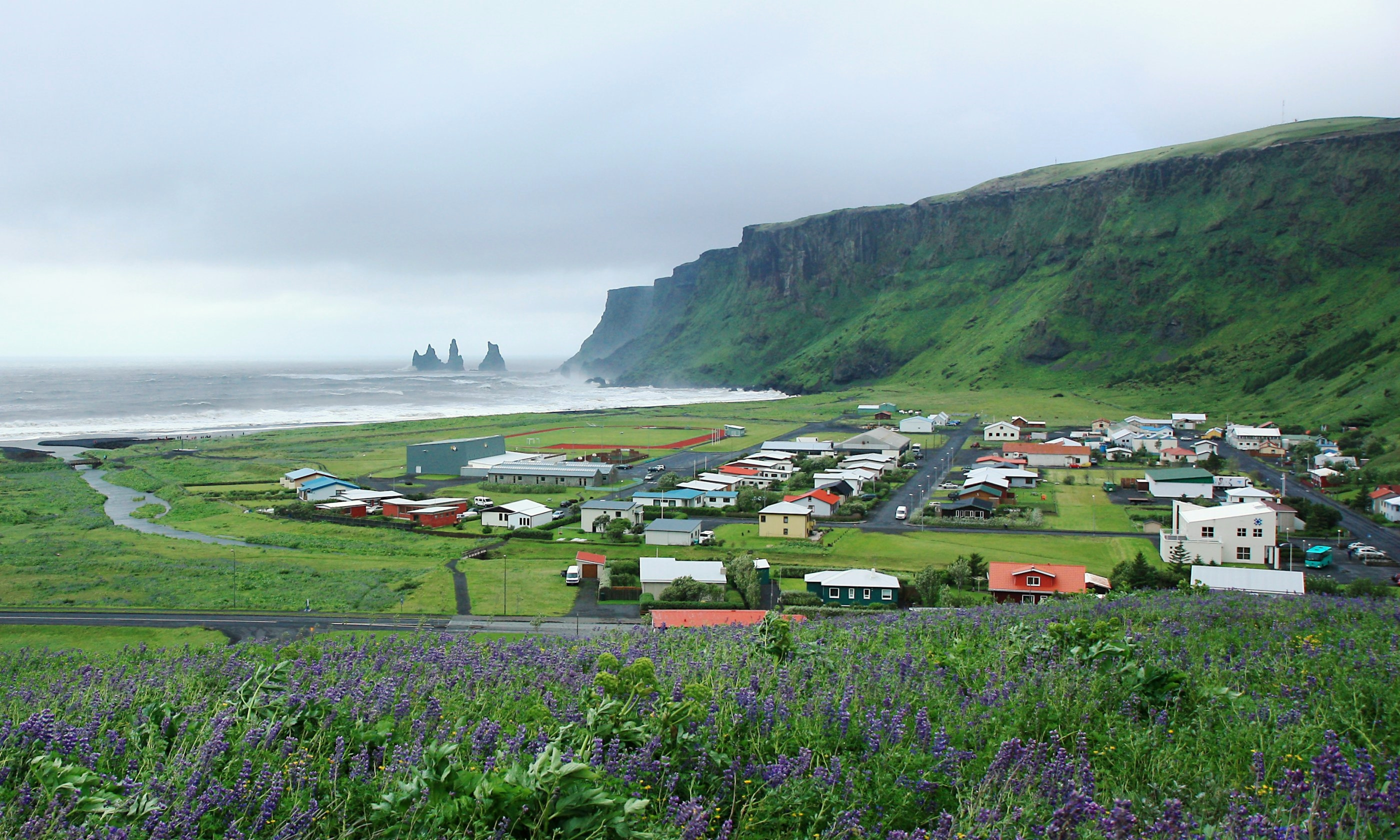
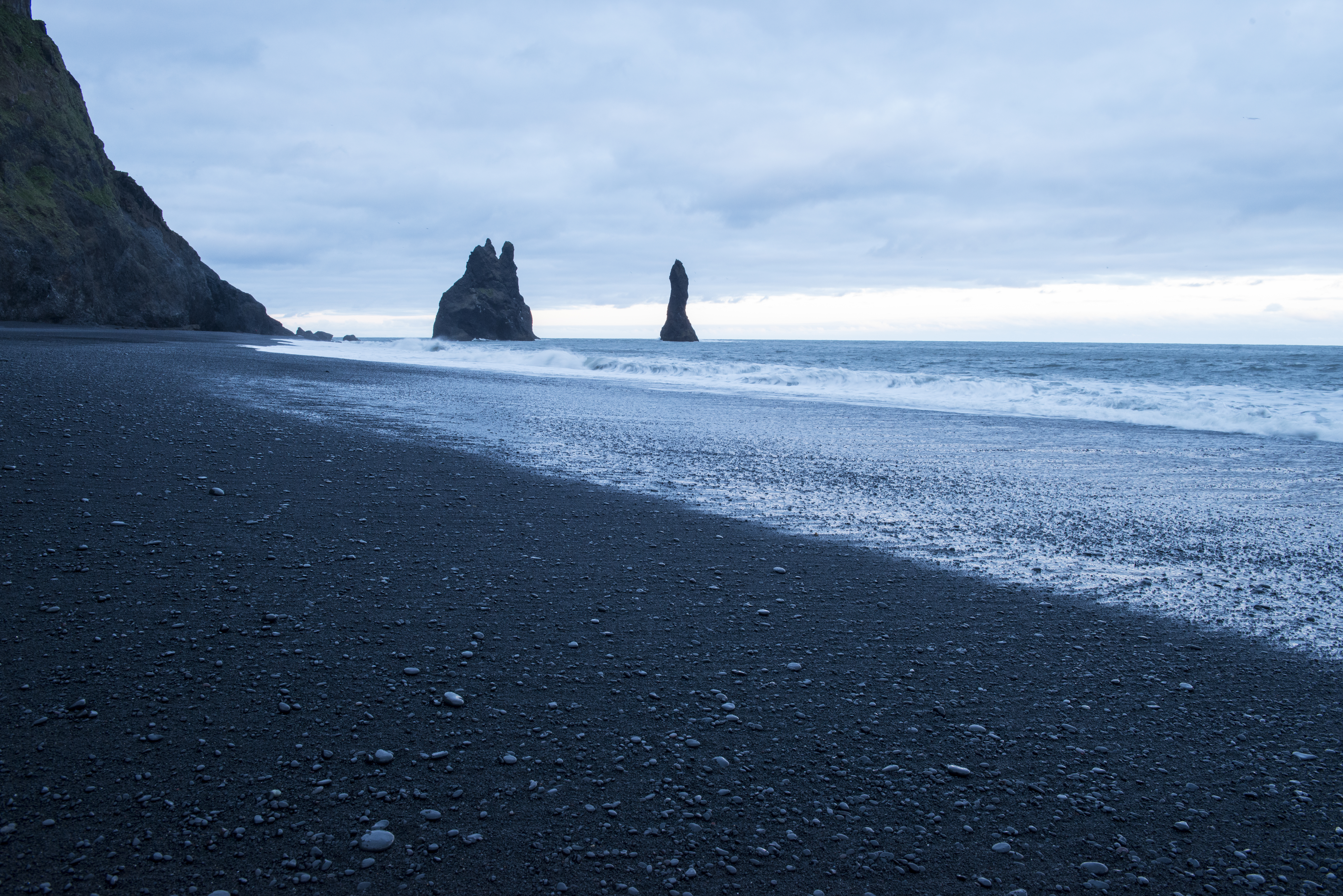
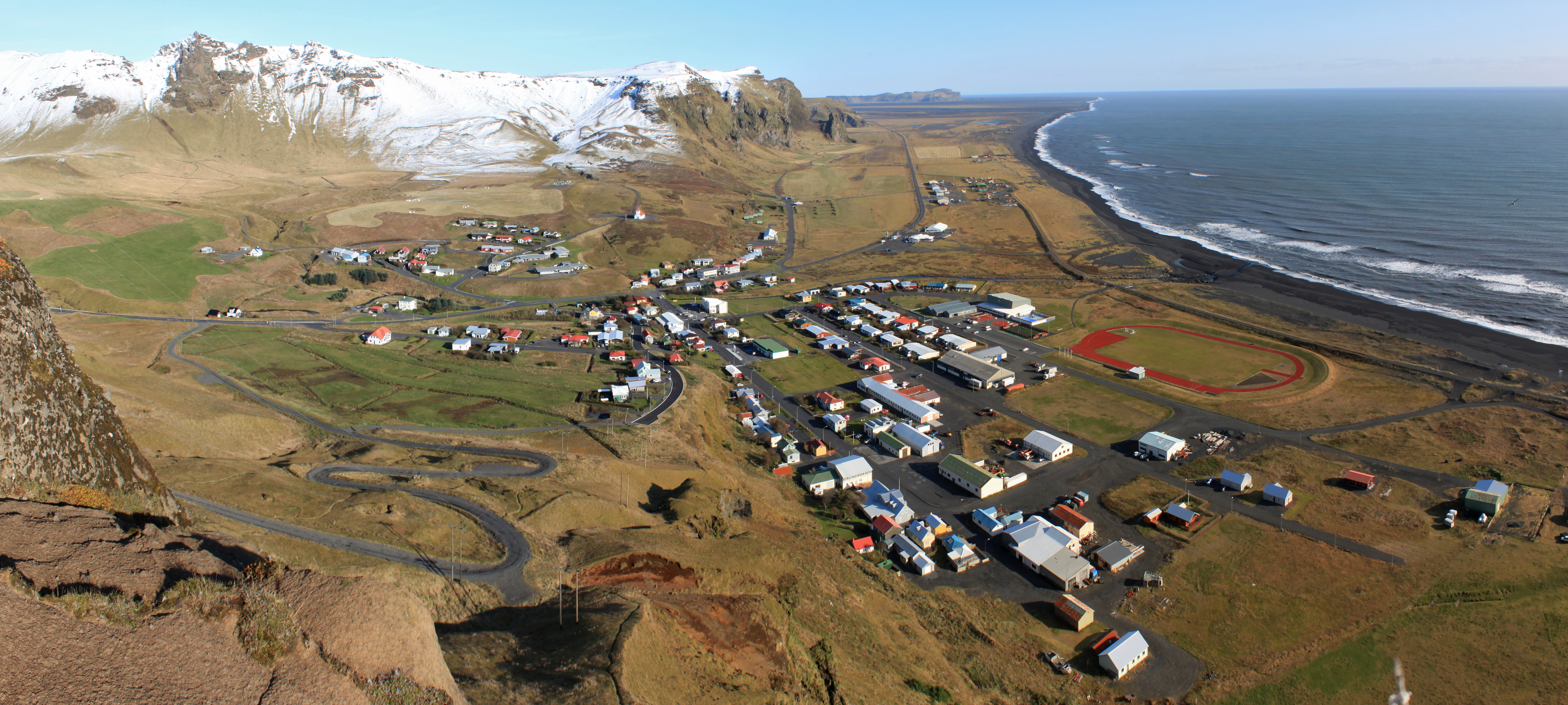
- Vík in summer Reynisfjara black sand beach Vík Church Vík from above

- Location within Iceland Location within Europe
- Coordinates: 63°25′N 19°00′W
- Country: Iceland
- Constituency: South Constituency
- Region: Southern Region
- Municipality: Mýrdalshreppur

Population (Town: 2016 / Metro: 2021)
  - Town: 318
  - Metro: 750
- Time zone: UTC+0 (GMT)
- Website: www.vik.is/is/

Vík í Mýrdal ([ˈviːk iː ˈmirˌtaːl̥], lit. 'Vík in Mire Dale'), also known as Vík (Icelandic pronunciation: [ˈviːk]) in short, is the southernmost village in Iceland. It is located on the main ring road around the island, and is around 180 km (110 mi) southeast of Reykjavík by road.

Despite its small size (750 inhabitants in Mýrdalshreppur as of January 2021) it is the largest settlement for some 70 km (43 mi) around and is an important staging post. It is an important service center for both inhabitants and visitors to the coastal strip between Skógar and the west edge of the Mýrdalssandur glacial outwash plain.

== Overview ==
In 1991, the US journal Islands Magazine counted the beach at Vík as one of the ten most beautiful beaches on Earth. Its stretch of black basalt sand is one of the wettest places in Iceland. The cliffs west of the beach are home to many seabirds, most notably puffins which burrow into the shallow soils during nesting season. Offshore lie stacks of basalt rock, remnants of a once more extensive cliffline Reynisfjall ([ˈreiːnɪsˌfjatl̥]), now battered by the sea. According to folklore, the sea stacks are former trolls who tried to drag their boats out to sea only to be caught by the rising dawn. The sea around them is rather wild and stormy, and travelers will note a monument to the memory of drowned seamen on the beach.

Contemporary legends tell the story of a husband who found his wife taken by the two trolls, and frozen at night. The husband made the two trolls swear to never kill anyone ever again. His wife was the love of his life, whose free spirit he was unable to provide a home for. She found her fate out among the trolls, rocks, and sea at Reynisfjara ([ˈreiːnɪsˌfjaːra]).

The village was affected by volcanic ash during the 2010 eruptions of Eyjafjallajökull. Ungmennafélagið Katla is a sports club based in Vík í Mýrdal.

== Katla volcano ==
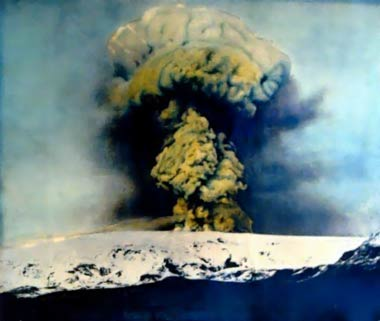
Katla eruption, 1918

Vík lies directly south of the Mýrdalsjökull glacier, which itself is on top of the Katla volcano. Katla has not erupted since 1918, and as this is longer than typical dormant period, there has been speculation that an eruption may occur soon. An eruption of Katla could melt enough ice to trigger an enormous flash flood, potentially large enough to obliterate the entire town. The town's church, (Icelandic: Víkurkirkja), located on a high hill, is believed to be the only building that would survive such a flood.

The people of Vík are aware that they may only have 15 minutes to evacuate to the church at the first sign of an eruption. The town has 1,400 hotel rooms for scientists and tourists, who are also briefed about Katla's dangers.

== Vík Church ==
The town's church, (Icelandic: Víkurkirkja), is a Lutheran church which is a popular tourist attraction. It is located on a high hill overlooking the town.

It was designed by Guðjón Samúelsson, who was the a State Architect of Iceland, and the first Icelander to be educated in architecture. The chief builder was Matthias Einarsson. It is a concrete building with seating capacity of 160 people. The front windows of the church are decorated with stained glass works by Hrafnhildur Ágústsdóttir with references to scripture. The altarpiece of the church is a replica of Carl Bloch's Gethsemane by Brynjólfur Þórðarson. The church organ is an 11-stop pipe organ built by Ketill Sigurjónsson with carvings by Sigríður Kristjánsdóttir. There are two church bells, an older one from Höfðabrekku church and a new and slightly larger one from 1958.

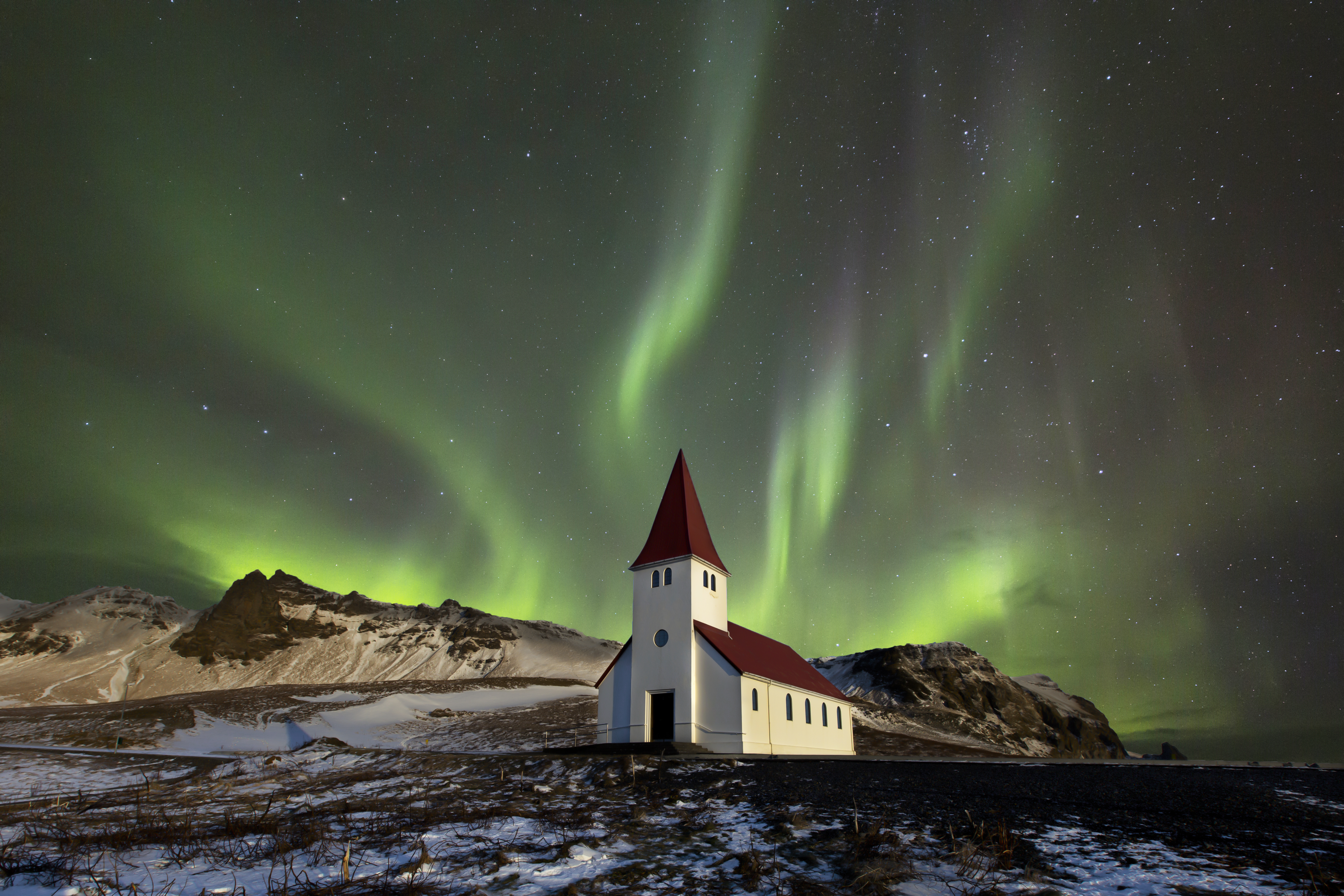
A composite image of Víkurkirkja on a clear night with aurora lit sky (taken from another image)

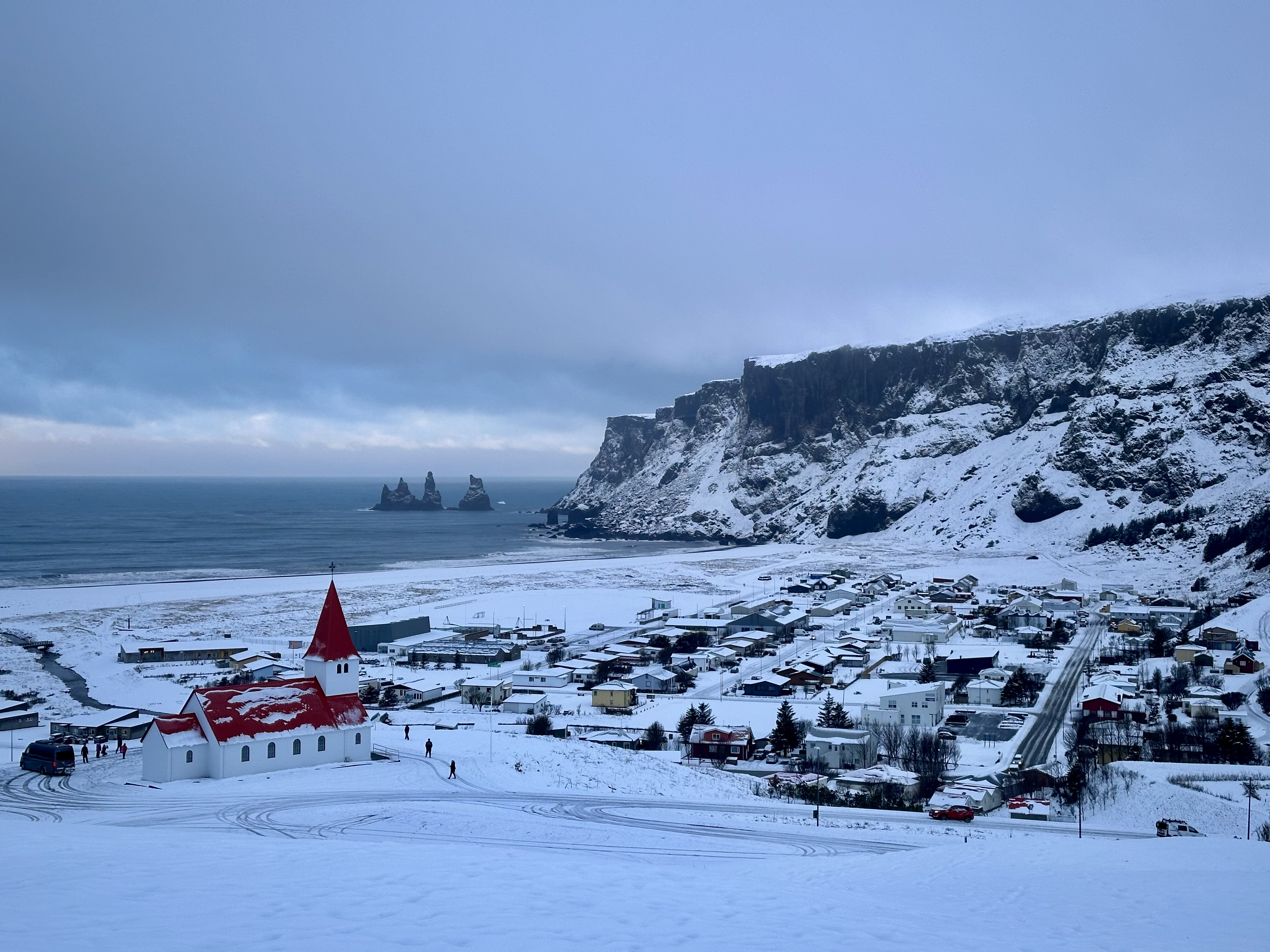
Vík in winter with the church in foreground

Interior of the church

The church as seen from its side

== Climate ==
Vík í Mýrdal is the warmest place in Iceland, with an annual mean temperature of 5.3 °C (41.5 °F). Like most of coastal Iceland, Vík í Mýrdal has a subpolar oceanic climate (Koppen Cfc) with cold but not severe winters, and cool, short summers. Its winters are among the warmest in Iceland, with an average winter day having a daytime high around 4 °C (39 °F). Because it lies on the windward side of the Gulf Stream, Vík í Mýrdal is the wettest coastal town in Iceland, with an annual rainfall of 2,250 millimetres (89 in), which is three times more than Reykjavík, five times more than Akureyri on the north coast of the island, and many times more than its far northern location would normally indicate. Precipitation on the Mýrdalsjökull and Vatnajökull glaciers near the town is believed to be as high as 4,100 millimetres (160 in) of rainfall equivalent, which would mean at least 49 metres (160 ft) of snow at those higher altitudes.

Climate data for Vík í Mýrdal (1961-1990); Extremes (1961-2011)
Month	Jan	Feb	Mar	Apr	May	Jun	Jul	Aug	Sep	Oct	Nov	Dec	Year
Record high °C (°F)	10.6 (51.1)	13.0 (55.4)	12.5 (54.5)	15.8 (60.4)	19.7 (67.5)	21.5 (70.7)	23.1 (73.6)	24.4 (75.9)	17.2 (63.0)	16.5 (61.7)	13.4 (56.1)	11.9 (53.4)	24.4 (75.9)
Mean daily maximum °C (°F)	3.5 (38.3)	4.0 (39.2)	4.4 (39.9)	6.5 (43.7)	9.0 (48.2)	11.3 (52.3)	13.2 (55.8)	12.8 (55.0)	10.3 (50.5)	7.4 (45.3)	4.7 (40.5)	3.6 (38.5)	7.6 (45.6)
Daily mean °C (°F)	1.2 (34.2)	2.0 (35.6)	1.9 (35.4)	4.0 (39.2)	6.7 (44.1)	8.9 (48.0)	10.8 (51.4)	10.6 (51.1)	8.1 (46.6)	5.4 (41.7)	2.6 (36.7)	1.3 (34.3)	5.3 (41.5)
Mean daily minimum °C (°F)	−1.4 (29.5)	−0.6 (30.9)	−0.7 (30.7)	1.4 (34.5)	4.1 (39.4)	6.7 (44.1)	8.3 (46.9)	8.0 (46.4)	5.4 (41.7)	2.8 (37.0)	−0.1 (31.8)	−1.3 (29.7)	2.7 (36.9)
Record low °C (°F)	−13.2 (8.2)	−15.9 (3.4)	−13.4 (7.9)	−16.9 (1.6)	−6.2 (20.8)	−1.6 (29.1)	2.5 (36.5)	1.2 (34.2)	−3.3 (26.1)	−9.9 (14.2)	−12.2 (10.0)	−14.0 (6.8)	−16.9 (1.6)
Average precipitation mm (inches)	203.1 (8.00)	178.6 (7.03)	184.7 (7.27)	155.9 (6.14)	137.7 (5.42)	171.7 (6.76)	151.7 (5.97)	211.0 (8.31)	214.4 (8.44)	242.2 (9.54)	195.3 (7.69)	206.2 (8.12)	2,252.5 (88.69)
Source: Icelandic Met Office

== In popular culture ==
Vík í Mýrdal serves as the primary setting of Netflix's Icelandic original series Katla, which follows a group of the village's inhabitants as they struggle in the aftermath of the volcano's first eruption since 1918.

== See also ==
- List of settlements in Iceland
- Reynisdrangar
