= Skaftá =

River in Iceland

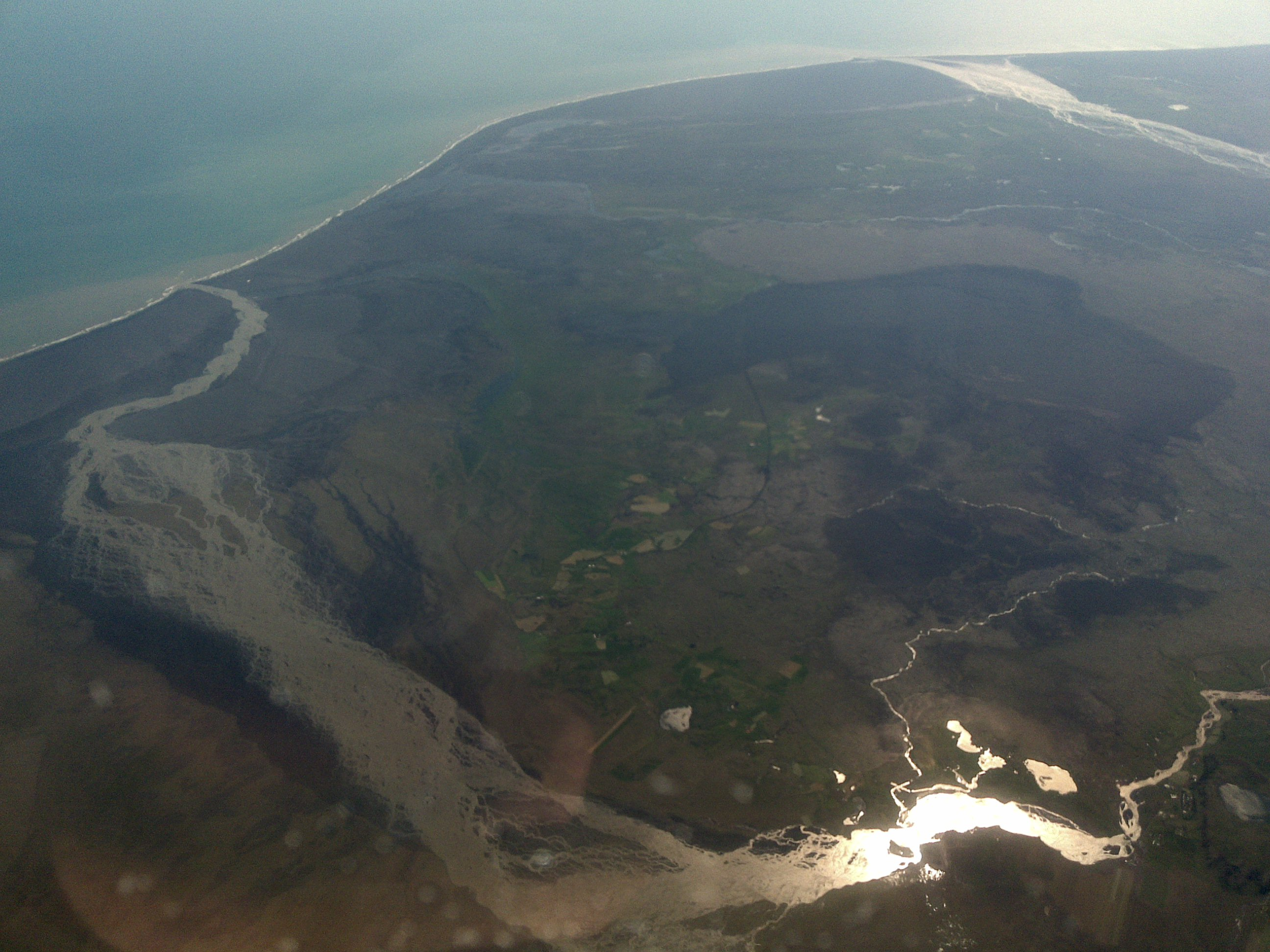
- Aerial view of main branch of the Skaftá where it flows into the Atlantic

Location
- Country: Iceland

Physical characteristics
- Mouth: Atlantic Ocean
  - coordinates: 63°39′50″N 17°48′0″W (primary)
- Length: 115 km (71 mi)
- Discharge
  - average: 122 m^{3}/s (4,300 cu ft/s)

Basin features
- Landmarks: Kirkjubæjarklaustur
- Tributaries
  - left: Grjótá, Hellisá, Fjaðrá
  - right: Útfall, Nyðri-Ófærá, Syðri-Ófærá

The Skaftá (Icelandic pronunciation: [ˈskaftˌauː]) is a river in South Iceland. It is primarily glacial in origin and has had its course modified by volcanic activity; as a result of both, it often floods because of glacial melting.

== Course ==
The river's primary source is two subglacial "cauldrons" beneath Skaftájökull, part of the Vatnajökull glacier in the interior of Iceland. It also receives spring-fed water from Langisjór, a lake a short distance to the west from which a tributary called the Útfall runs into the Skaftá. Other tributaries include the North and South Ófaerá, the Grjótá, and the Hellisá.

West of Skaftárdalur, a farm named for the river valley, the Skaftá runs over a lava field in many channels, which recombine into three for the remainder of its course to the Atlantic: the Eldvatn or Ása-Eldvatn combines with the River Kúðafljót; the Ásakvísl or Árkvísla flows under a sand-covered lava field and has been affected by road construction; the third, easternmost branch, which flows near Kirkjubæjarklaustur, retains the name Skaftá but has extremely low water levels when temperatures are lowest. Its total length is approximately 115 kilometres (71 mi).

The river was bridged at Kirkjubæjarklaustur in 1903 and the Ása-Eldvatn was bridged soon after. Efforts to bank and bridge the Ásakvísl have led to undermining of the bridge works and to erosion of land formerly watered by it.

Subglacial drainage of Skaftá jökulhlaups

== Jökulhlaups ==
Beginning on June 8, 1783, the multi-year eruption of the volcanic system including Grímsvötn and Þórðarhyrna (sometimes referred to in Icelandic as the Skaftáreldur, Skaftá Fires) filled the river valley with lava, including a gorge thought to have been 200 metres (660 ft) deep, diverting its flow into the multiple shallow channels that now characterize its course. As a result it is more susceptible to jökulhlaups (glacial outburst floods), which occur every one to two years. The 2015 flood was unusually damaging, the largest since records began.

Jökulhlaups may originate from either or both the western ice cauldron (Icelandic: Skaftárketill Vestari) or eastern ice cauldron (Icelandic: Skaftárketill Eystri) and it may initially be difficult to assign a source with confidence. The cauldrons are associated with the two subglacial lakes (Icelandic: Skaftárkatlar), separated by a ridge at least 50 m (160 ft) high with no direct contact between them at the glacier bed bottom. Sampling of microfloria has suggested not only that the two Skaftá ice lakes are connected through an aquifer in the underlying permeable basalt, but that this connection extends to the 6 km (3.7 mi) more distant Grímsvötn cauldron which drains via a different watershed.

The long term trend appears to be for the western cauldron to produce floods more frequently and for the eastern cauldron to produce the largest floods.

Skaftá Jökulhlaups since 2000 (minor not shown, see Atladóttir 2013 for those between 1955 and 2000)
Year	Source	Maximum Flow	Comment (Note: Jökulhlaup criteria for significance is road closure but this is arguable as valuable property damage can be minimal, especially with current warning mechanisms.)
2025	Unknown	250 m^{3}/s (8,800 cu ft/s)	
2023	Eastern	620 m^{3}/s (22,000 cu ft/s)	
2021	Eastern	1,500 m^{3}/s (53,000 cu ft/s)	
2021	Western	610 m^{3}/s (22,000 cu ft/s)	modest flood that preceded the significant Eastern Cauldron flood by a few days
2018	Both	2,000 m^{3}/s (71,000 cu ft/s)	Large flood, but little impact due to accurate warning technology apart from destroyed bridges.
2015	Eastern	3,000 m^{3}/s (110,000 cu ft/s)	The October event was the largest flood on record with significant infrastructure impact.
2012	Western	380 m^{3}/s (13,000 cu ft/s)	
2011	Western	404 m^{3}/s (14,300 cu ft/s)	
2010	Eastern	1,283 m^{3}/s (45,300 cu ft/s)	Large downstream area flooded Eldhraun to the sea.
2010	Western	558 m^{3}/s (19,700 cu ft/s)	
2008	Eastern	1,350 m^{3}/s (48,000 cu ft/s)	
2008	Western	390 m^{3}/s (14,000 cu ft/s)	
2006	Western	194 m^{3}/s (6,900 cu ft/s)	
2006	Eastern	1,370 m^{3}/s (48,000 cu ft/s)	
2005	Western	723 m^{3}/s (25,500 cu ft/s)	
2003	Eastern	241 m^{3}/s (8,500 cu ft/s)	
2003	Western	436 m^{3}/s (15,400 cu ft/s)	
2002	Eastern	689 m^{3}/s (24,300 cu ft/s)	
2002	Western	720 m^{3}/s (25,000 cu ft/s)	
2000	Eastern	1,240 m^{3}/s (44,000 cu ft/s)	
2000	Western	699 m^{3}/s (24,700 cu ft/s)	

== See also ==
- Ice cauldron (Skaftákatlar)
