= Kolbeinsá =

Farm and river in Iceland

Coordinates: 65°26′N 21°13′W

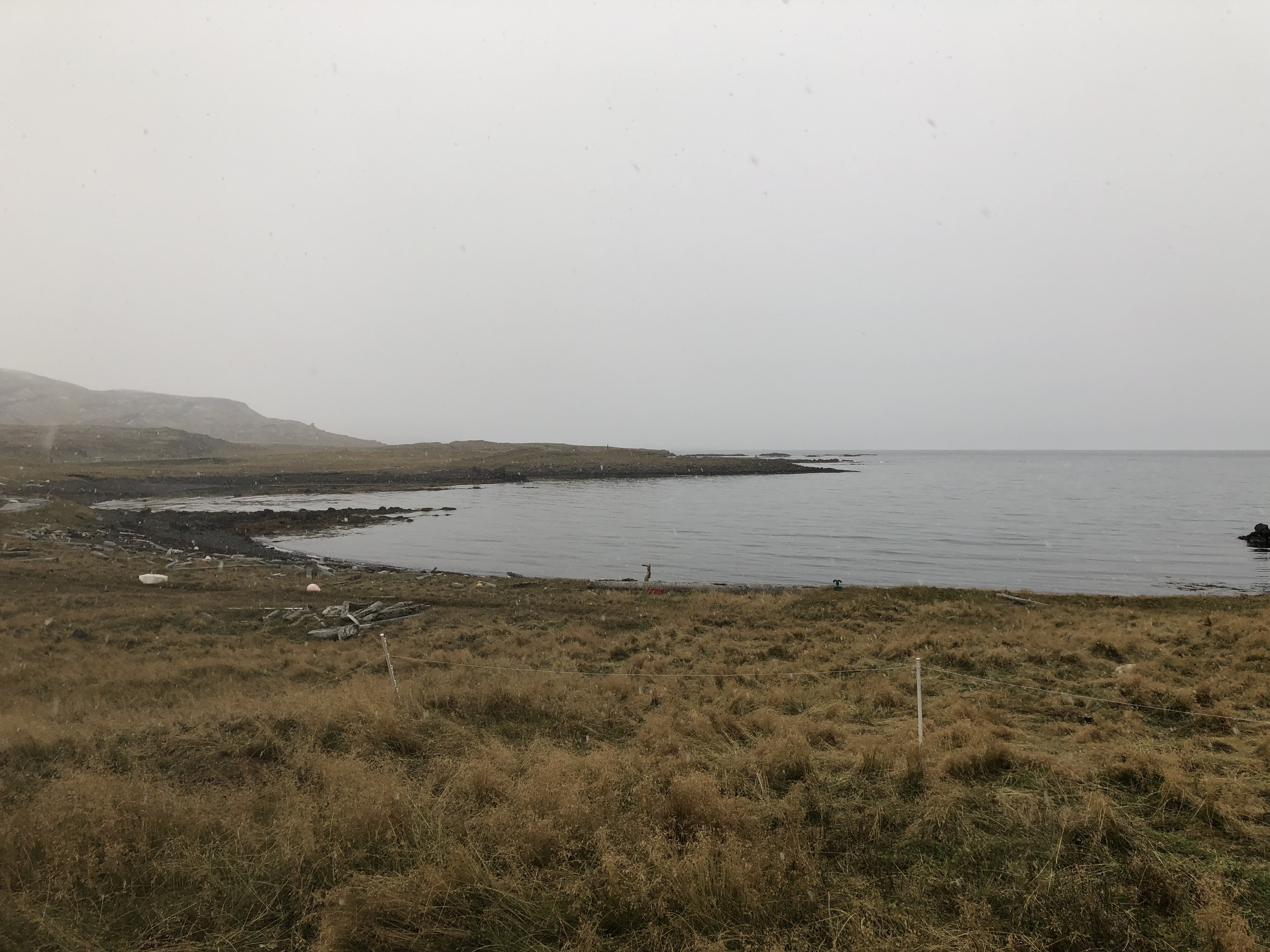
- Kolbeinsá

- Location within Iceland

Location
- Country: Iceland
- Region: Westfjords

Physical characteristics
- Length: 10 km (6.2 mi)

Kolbeinsá (Icelandic pronunciation: [ˈkʰɔlˌpeinsˌauː]) is a farm and river about 10 km long in Westfjords, Iceland.
