= Mýrdalsjökull =

Glacier in Iceland

Coordinates: 63°40′N 19°06′W

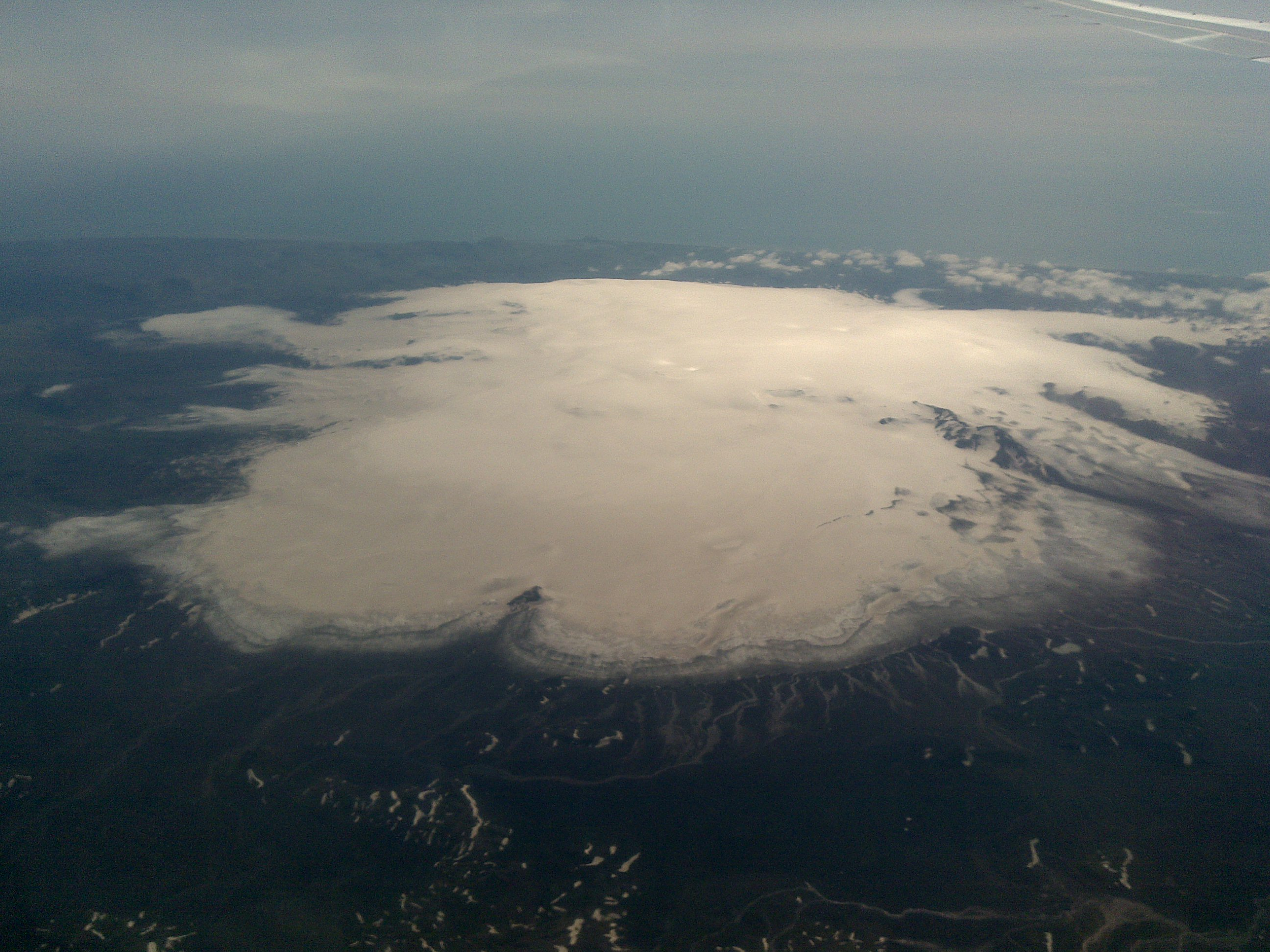
- Aerial view of Mýrdalsjökull.
- Map of Mýrdalsjökull glacier showing its named outlet glaciers and surface glacial catchments (light grey shading). (Note: All mappings of Mýrdalsjökull catchments identified had elements that suggest only partial mapping of surface glacial catchments for Mýrdalsjökull may exist hence the area of uncertainty assigned to Mýrdalsjökull in this mapping. Different mappings exist in some of the sources used in this article including subsurface catchments for jökulhlaups.) Clicking on the map rectangle to enlarge it, enables mouse over that allows identification of individual glaciers.
- Type: Ice cap
- Location: Southwestern Iceland
- Area: 520 km^{2} (200 sq mi)
- Thickness: Average 230 m (750 ft)
- Highest elevation: 1,450 metres (4,760 ft)
- Terminus: Sléttjökull, Öldufellsjökull, Sandfellsjökull, Kötlujökull, Huldujökull, Mosakambsökull, Klifurárjökull, Sólheimajökull, Jökulsárgilsjökull, Hrunajökull, Tungnakvíslarjökull, Goðalandsjökull, Hrútárökull, and Entujökull
- Status: Retreating

Mýrdalsjökull (pronounced [ˈmirˌtalsˌjœːkʏtl̥], Icelandic for "(the) mire dale glacier" or "(the) mire valley glacier") is an ice cap on the top of the Katla volcano in the south of Iceland. It is to the north of the town of Vík í Mýrdal and to the east of the smaller ice cap Eyjafjallajökull. Between these two glaciers is the Fimmvörðuháls pass.

The glacier contributes to the most serious natural hazard area of Iceland.

== Setting ==
The icecap of the glacier covers an active volcano. The caldera of Katla has a diameter of 10 km (6 mi) and the volcano erupts usually every 40–80 years. The last eruption took place in 1918. Scientists are actively monitoring the volcano, particularly after the eruption of nearby Eyjafjallajökull began in April 2010. There is a further historic relationship with Eyjafjallajökull as the two glaciers were continuous as a single ice cap at the end of the 19th century and only separated into the larger Mýrdalsjökull and smaller Eyjafjallajökull in the middle of the twentieth century. Since the year 930, 16 eruptions have been documented and in the last 8400 years about 300 explosive basalt eruptions are known to have originated from Katla.

While Katla mountain is 30–35 km (19–22 mi) in diameter at its base, more relevant to the present ice cover is its diameter closer to 20 km (12 mi) at 700 m (2,300 ft) elevation. The lowest pass out of the caldera is at 740 m (2,430 ft). This caldera is between 650–750 m (2,130–2,460 ft) deep and is surrounded by a rim of 1,300–1,380 m (4,270–4,530 ft) high mountains. Ice cauldrons are found within the caldera. The glacier's recent peak ice cover has reached 1,493 m (4,898 ft) in height and in the year 1980 it covered an area of approximately 595 km^{2} (230 sq mi). In 2016 the covered area of Mýrdalsjökull was believed to be 540 km^{2} (210 sq mi). The area was 520 km^{2} (200 sq mi) in 2019. The volume of ice is about 140 km^{3} (34 cu mi).

The Eldgjá, a volcanic eruption fissure about 30 km (19 mi) long, which erupted in the year 939, is part of the same volcanic system.

Before the Hringvegur (the main ring road round the island) was built, people feared traversing the plains in front of the volcano because of the frequent jökulhlaups (glacial floods) and the deep rivers to be crossed, although the road is still vulnerable to major events. Especially dangerous was the glacial flood after the eruption of 1918 when the coastline was extended by 5 km (3.1 mi) by laharic flood deposits.

Mýrdalsjökull is an exceedingly high precipitation location, with models suggesting parts of it receive more than 10 metres of rainfall equivalent annually.

== Glaciation History ==
The last glacial period came to an end 11,500 years ago and was followed by the Holocene. Mýrdalsjökull is likely to have been present throughout the Holocene and definitely the last 8400 years as there is no evidence of degassed erupted tephra from Katla. Jökulhlaup's 8000 to 6000 years ago took a path over the highest pass in the caldera wall which does not support a crater lake source but would happen with an ice cap.

Until the development of remote satellite imaging it was impossible to monitor to annual accuracy the mass balance of Mýrdalsjökull. Such techniques allowed it to be determined for Mýrdalsjökull that it is the summer temperatures that are the predominant driving factor in the recent recession of the glacier. However past proxy means of measurement such as outlet length of the Sólheimajökull outlet glacier were also consistent with this. Any such studies related to climate change have to be qualified as past volcanic processes have resulted in the loss of up to 5% of the ice cap on more than one occasion.

== Jökulhlaups ==
There is complexity with assigning the outlet glacier catchments, but from the point of view of hazard assessment related to the glaciers this is simplified considerably, as the hazard risk of jökulhlaups relates mainly to water drainage sectors based upon the ice caps surface topography rather than ice flow. There can be risk associated with co-emitted volcanic gases. Such an approach creates three drainage sectors which do not reflect intracaldera bedrock topography or many of the outlet glaciers. (Note: See and)

The biggest Mýrdalsjökull jökulhlaups, as in the 1775 eruption, are massive floods by any standard with maximum discharges of the order of several 100,000 m^{3}/s (3,500,000 cu ft/s) ten to a hundred times other recent jökulhlaup's in Iceland. (Note: See for example. Other sources in the same volume of that journal rise to the theme of large floods but many other authors in the literature may emphasise the smaller twice a century floods that are comparable in size with jökulhlaups elsewhere in Iceland, not the very large floods every 500 years or so in their risk assessments.) Most recent jökulhlaup (17 out of the 20 since the year 874) have descended to the east through Kotlujökull onto the Mýrdalssandur plain with about two large floods a century (i.e. presently overdue). This Ko sector has about 60 km^{2} (23 sq mi) within the caldera rim but underlies about 323 km^{2} (125 sq mi) of the ice cap itself. (Note: This total size is as published in 2000 and can be estimated to be about 20% smaller in 2019 but no up to date watershed area data could be identified.) However, due to location factors of the original melt water, the Katla 934 and 1860 jökulhlaups also descended through Sólheimajökull to the Sólheimasandu flood plain. This So sector has about 19 km^{2} (7.3 sq mi) of its water drainage catchment within the caldera rim and a total ice cap catchment of 108 km^{2} (42 sq mi). There have been 5 jökulhlaups since 874. It is perhaps not so significant from a hazard point of view as the 23 km^{2} (8.9 sq mi) water drainage catchment within the caldera rim northwest through Entujökull where a large jökulhlaup occurred in 874. This En sector with total ice cap catchment of about 167 km^{2} (64 sq mi), has rare but very large jökulhlaups every 500 to 800 years down the fairly well populated and developed Markarfljótsaurar flood plain.

Jökulhlaup triggering can be complex (there are at least seven potential causes), and at Mýrdalsjökull results from geothermal processes, ice dams and their sudden removal by floating as well as eruptions which can be primary or secondary to the removal of overpressure. Björnsson originally described 12 geothermal ice cauldrons and three eruption sites since 1755 associated with Mýrdalsjökull. Later work clarified that these newly formed and could become inactive. Further work mapped at least 17 ice cauldrons, all associated with the caldera of Katla and three areas of increased seismic activity, that have been postulated to be likely jökulhlaup sources, being Austmannsbunga in the north-east of the caldera and the 1755 and 1823/1918 eruption sites to the west and south as noted by Björnsson. There are regular surveys now, with by 2019 twenty mapped ice cauldrons. (Note: The positions and number of ice cauldrons have changed with time with a count of 20 from data used in preparation of map on this page. The map uses original literature reported positions to avoid confusion but numbering as assigned by University of Iceland. There are some transient ice cauldrons with for example a 1918 eruption site associated ice cauldron appearing to become inactive between 1999 and 2005. This cauldron (C8) is shown on multiple more recent mappings.) Smaller and more frequent jökulhlaups tend to be associated with the geothermal ice caldron process. There is a warning system which uses in the case of geothermal events the increased conductivity of the river waters and can detect seismic flood tremor.

The most likely next very disruptive volcanogenic jökulhlaup will almost certainly flow from Kotlujökull, over Mýrdalssandur to the sea. This has been assigned a 89% probability within 30 years, affecting possibly the town of Vík, likely associated with eruption of 1.5 km^{3} (0.36 cu mi) of tephra (so disruptive to air travel) (Note: see Katla (volcano), Eyjafjallajökull, 2010 eruptions of Eyjafjallajökull, Effects of the April 2010 Eyjafjallajökull eruption and Air travel disruption after the 2010 Eyjafjallajökull eruption articles.) and likely occurring in the months June to September. There is a lower probability of an Entujökull jökulhlaup of the same size which is expected to have far graver environmental, social and geomorphological consequences affecting the town of Hvolsvöllur and surrounds.

Arrows show recent large jökulhlaup flows from Mýrdalsjökull ice cap. Current ice cauldrons are shown in violet: (Note: Jökulhlaup criteria for significance is road closure but this is arguable as valuable property damage can be minimal. Geothermal water discharges happen several times most years and floods associated with heavy rainfall are also common.)
1:from Kötlujökull to Leirá in 1721, 1755, 1918
2:from Kötlujökull / Sandfellsjökull to Austastikælir stream / Skálm river in 1612, 1625, 1660, 1721, 1755, 1823, 1860, 1918, 2024
3:from Kötlujökull to Blautakvísl river area of Mýrdalssandur in (1625), 1660, 1755, 1823, 1918
4:from Kötlujökull to Múlakvísl river area of Mýrdalssandur towards Kötlutangi and Höfðabrekkufjara beaches in 1612, 1625, 1660, 1721, 1755, 1823, 1860, 1918
5:from Kötlujökull to Múlakvísl river area of Mýrdalssandur towards Höfðabrekkufjara beach in 1612, 1625, 1660, 1721, 1755, 1823, 1860, 1918, 1955, 1999, 2011, 2014, 2017
6:from Múlakvísl river area towards Kerlingardalsfjara beach in 1660, 1721, 1755, 1823, 1860
7:from Sólheimajökull towards Sólheimasandur in 1860, 1999
8:from Jökulsárgilsjökull towards Jökulsárgil in 1936

Recent Mýrdalsjökull Jökulhlaups
| Year | Drainage | Geography of flow | Comment |
|---|---|---|---|
| 2026 | Ko | Small geothermal jökulhlaup along Múlakvísl on 18 August. | Hydrogen sulfide gas pollution was significant. |
| 2025 | Ko | Area of Mýrdalssandur along rivers Leirá Syðri and Skálm | On the 8 to 11 July a small geothermal jökulhlaup occurred that likely originated from the same source as the 2024 jökulhlaup. |
| 2024 | Ko | Area of Mýrdalssandur along river Skálm | On 27 July an unusual in origin geothermal jökulhlaup via mainly the Sandfellsjökull outlet area damaged the ring road. Peak flow was about 1,000 m^{3}/s (35,000 cu ft/s) |
| 2017 | Ko | Area of Mýrdalssandur along Múlakvísl River | On 29 July a small geothermal jökulhlaup occurred. |
| 2014 | Ko/So | Area of Mýrdalssandur along Múlakvísl and Jökulsá á Sólheimasandi rivers | Small geothermal floods in July |
| 2011 | Ko | Area of Mýrdalssandur along Múlakvísl River | On 9 July a small jökulhlaup destroyed the Ring Road bridge A smaller Jökulhlaup occurred on 6 September |
| 1999 | So | Sólheimajökull (Sólheimasandur) | On 17 July one day small jökulhlaup. Peak flow was 4,400 ± 1,200 m^{3}/s (155,000 ± 42,000 cu ft/s) |
| 1955 | Ko | Area of Mýrdalssandur along Múlakvísl River | Small 2,500 m^{3}/s (88,000 cu ft/s) jökulhlaup of geothermal origin destroyed the Ring Road bridge |
| 1936 | So | Jökulsárgilsjökull (Jökulsárgil ravine) | Small jökulhlaup |
| 1918 | Ko | Kötlujökull (Leirá, from foot of glacier to Austastikælir stream, area of Mýrdalssandur including Múlakvísl and Blautakvísl rivers, towards Kötlutangi and Höfðabrekkufjara beaches) | |
| 1860 | Ko/So | Kötlujökull (from foot of glacier to Austastikælir stream, area of Mýrdalssandur including Múlakvísl towards Kötlutangi, Höfðabrekkufjara and Kerlingardalsfjara beaches but excluding Blautakvísl river) and Sólheimajökull (Sólheimasandur) | lasted 20 days from 8 May 1860 |
| 1823 | Ko | Kötlujökull (from foot of glacier to Austastikælir stream, area of Mýrdalssandur including Múlakvísl and Blautakvísl rivers, towards Höfðabrekkufjara and Kerlingardalsfjara beaches) | |
| 1755 | Ko | Kötlujökull (Leirá, from foot of glacier to Austastikælir stream, area of Mýrdalssandur including Múlakvísl and Blautakvísl rivers, towards Kötlutangi, Höfðabrekkufjara and Kerlingardalsfjara beaches) | |
| 1721 | Ko | Kötlujökull (Leirá, from foot of glacier to Austastikælir stream, Mýrdalssandur including Múlakvísl towards Höfðabrekkufjara and Kerlingardalsfjara beaches but excluded Blautakvísl river and Kötlutangi beach) | |
| 1660 | Ko | Kötlujökull (from foot of glacier to Austastikælir stream, Mýrdalssandur including Múlakvísl and Blautakvísl rivers and definitely toward Höfðabrekkufjara and Kerlingardalsfjara beaches) | |
| 1625 | Ko | Kötlujökull (from foot of glacier to Austastikælir stream, Mýrdalssandur including Múlakvísl (and possibly Blautakvísl river), towards Höfðabrekkufjara beach) | |
| 1612 | Ko | Kötlujökull (from foot of glacier to Austastikælir stream, Mýrdalssandur including Múlakvísl river, towards Höfðabrekkufjara beach) | |

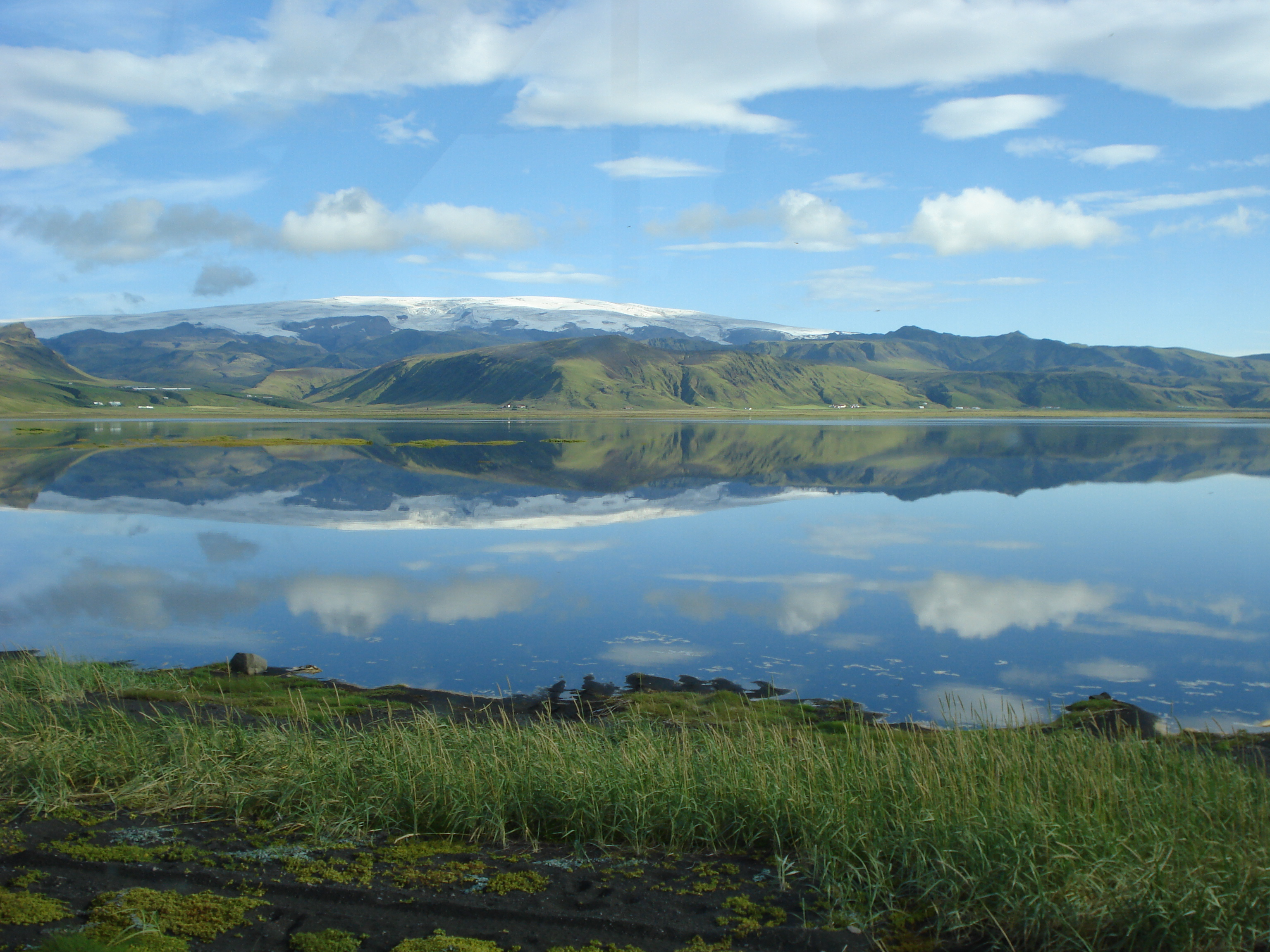
Mýrdalsjökull ice cap concealing Katla volcano

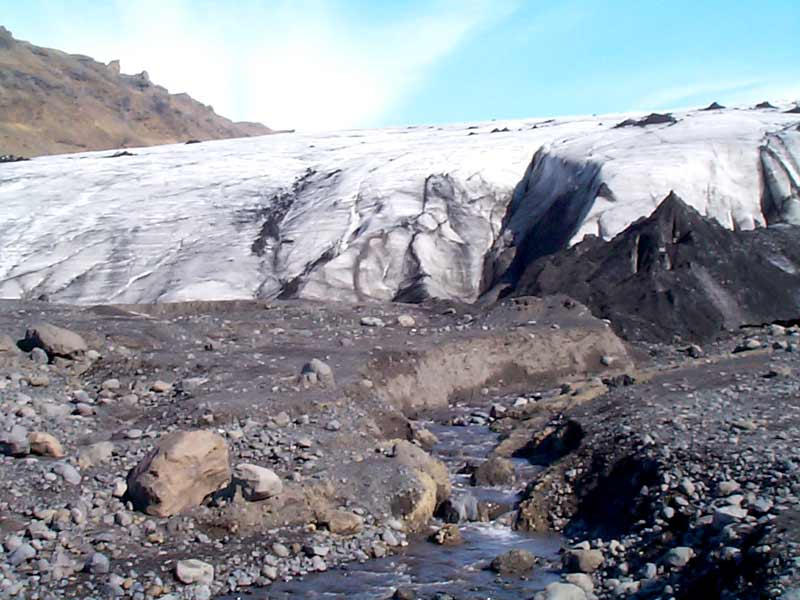
Mýrdalsjökull

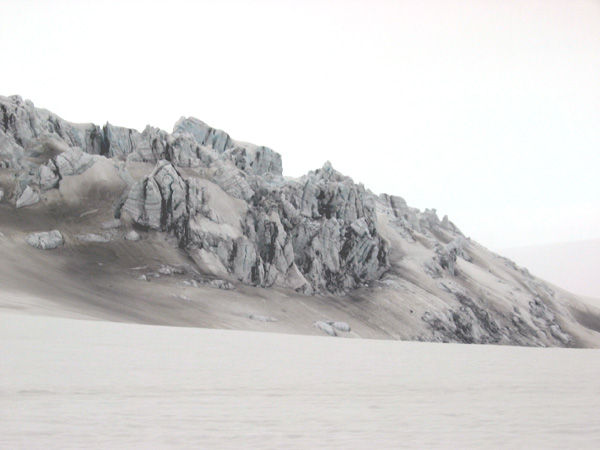
An "ice castle" formation on Mýrdalsjökull

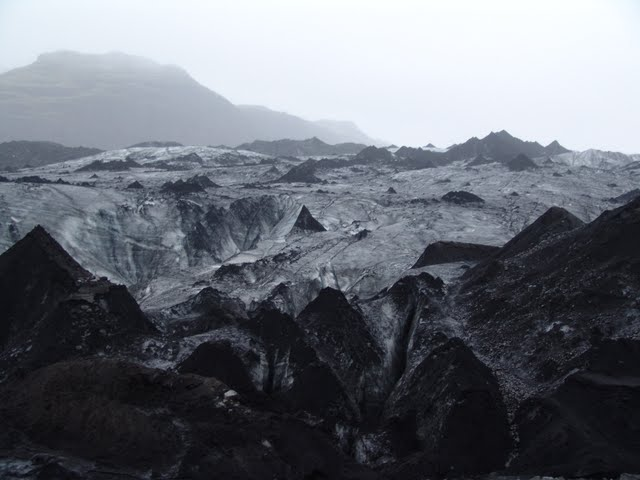
Mýrdalsjökull glacier covered volcanic ash

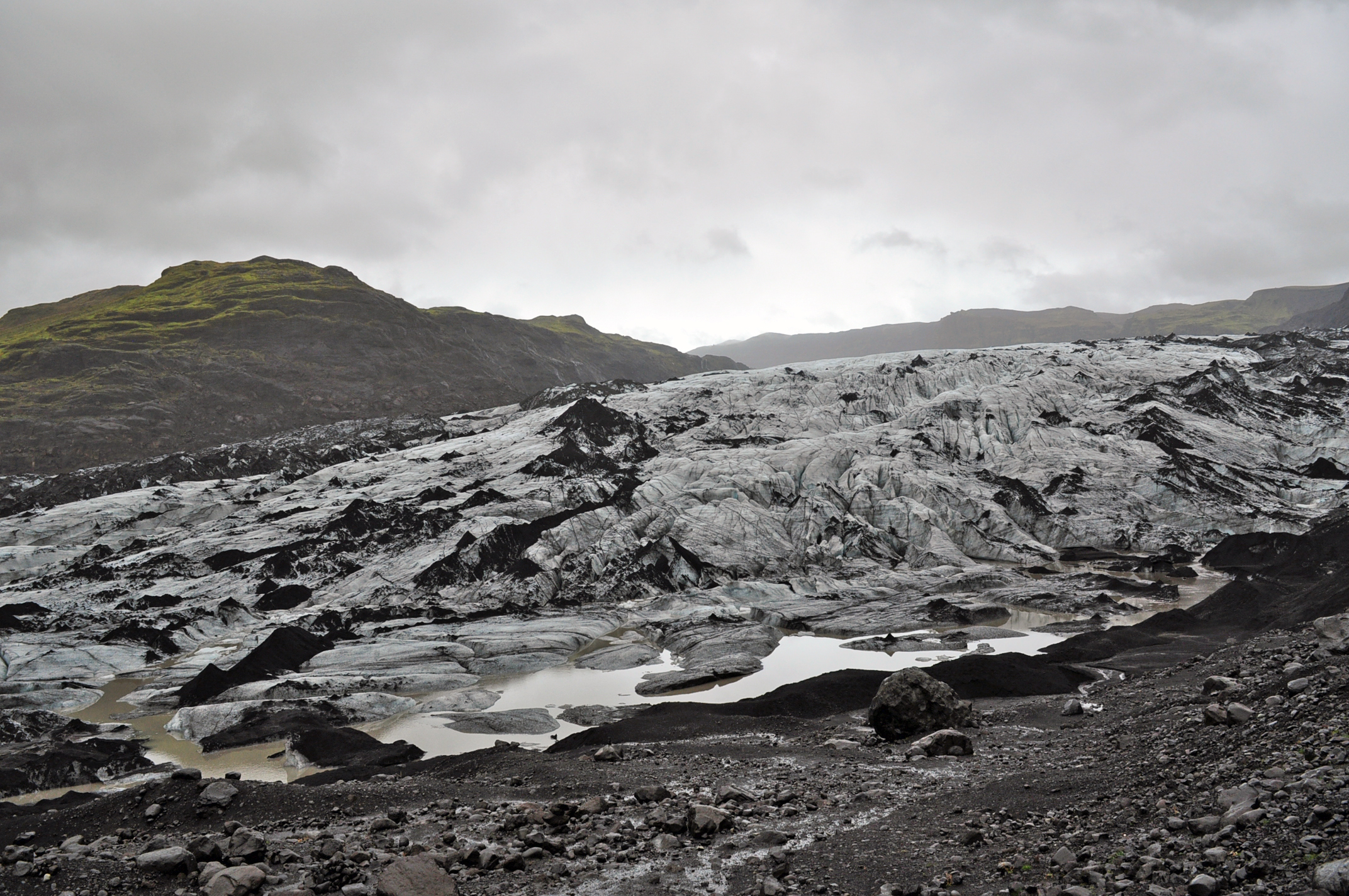
Outlet glacier Sólheimajökull

== See also ==
- Geography of Iceland
- Glaciers of Iceland
- Iceland plume
- List of lakes in Iceland
- List of islands of Iceland
- List of volcanoes in Iceland
- List of rivers of Iceland
- Volcanism of Iceland
- Waterfalls of Iceland
- List of glaciers
