= 2010 eruptions of Eyjafjallajökull =

Volcanic events in Iceland

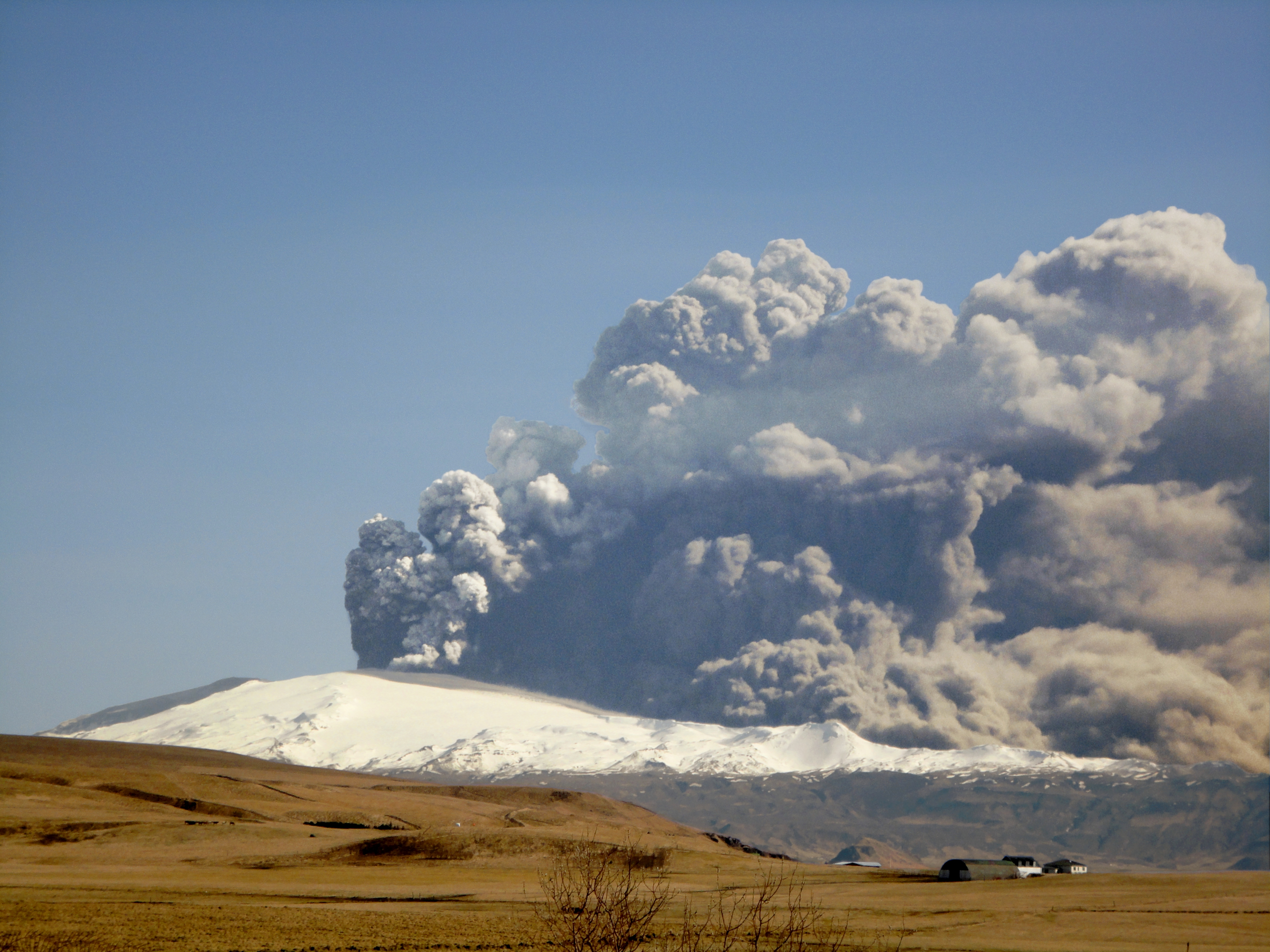
- Volcano plume on 17 April 2010
- Volcano: Eyjafjallajökull
- Start date: 20 March 2010
- End date: 23 June 2010
- Type: Hawaiian, Strombolian and Vulcanian eruption phases
- Location: Southern Region, Iceland; 63.6°N 19.6°W
- VEI: 4
- Impact: Large-scale disruption to air travel, smaller effects on farming in Iceland

Maps
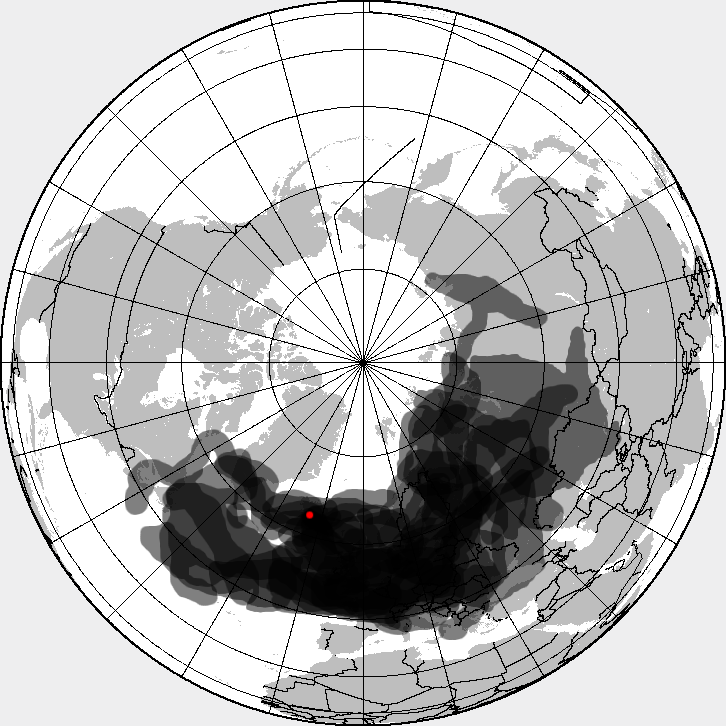
- Composite map of the volcanic ash cloud spanning 14–25 April 2010

Between March and June 2010 a series of volcanic events at Eyjafjallajökull in Iceland caused enormous disruption to air travel across Western Europe.

The disruptions started over an initial period of six days in April 2010. Additional localised disruption continued into May 2010, and eruptive activity persisted until June 2010. The eruption was declared officially over in October 2010, after 3 months of inactivity, when snow on the glacier did not melt. From 14 to 20 April, ash from the volcanic eruption covered large areas of Northern Europe. About 20 countries closed their airspace to commercial jet traffic, affecting approximately 10 million travellers.

Seismic activity started at the end of 2009 and gradually increased in intensity until on 20 March 2010, a small eruption began, rated as a 1 on the volcanic explosivity index.

Beginning on 14 April 2010, the eruption entered a second phase and created an ash cloud that led to the closure of most of the European IFR airspace from 15 until 20 April 2010. Consequently, a very high proportion of flights within, to, and from Europe were cancelled, creating the highest level of air travel disruption since the Second World War. The second phase resulted in an estimated 250 million cubic metres (330,000,000 cu yd) of ejected tephra and an ash plume that rose to a height of around 9 km (30,000 ft), which rates the explosive power of the eruption as a 4 on the Volcanic Explosivity Index. By 21 May 2010, the second eruption phase had subsided to the point that no further lava or ash was being produced.

By the evening of 6 June 2010, a small, new crater had opened up on the west side of the main crater. Explosive activity from this new crater was observed with emission of small quantities of ash. Seismic data showed that the frequency and intensity of earth tremors still exceeded the levels observed before the eruption, therefore scientists at the Icelandic Meteorological Office (IMO) and the Institute of Earth Sciences, University of Iceland (IES) continued to monitor the volcano.

In October 2010, Ármann Höskuldsson, a scientist at the University of Iceland Institute of Earth Sciences, stated that the eruption was officially over, although the area was still geothermally active and might erupt again.

== Background ==
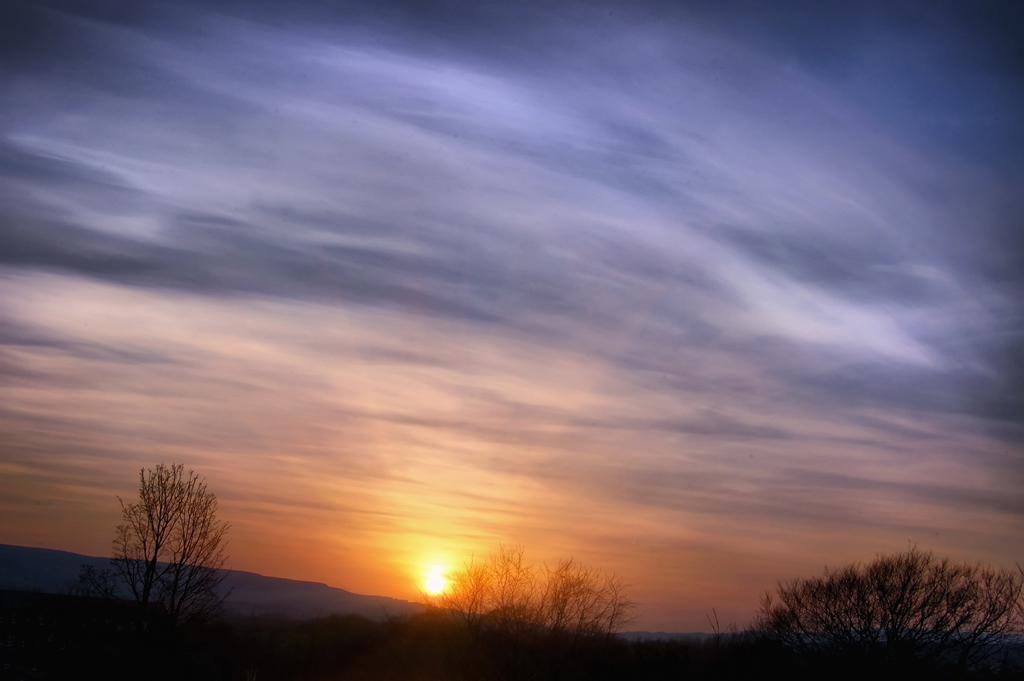
Dust particles that get suspended in the atmosphere scatter light from the setting sun, generating 'volcanic lavenders' like this one over the flight path of Leeds Bradford Airport in England during the aviation shutdown

Eyjafjallajökull (pronounced [ˈeiːjaˌfjatlaˌjœːkʏtl̥]) is one of Iceland's smaller ice caps located in the far south of the island. Situated to the north of Skógar and to the west of the larger ice cap Mýrdalsjökull, Eyjafjallajökull covers the caldera of a volcano 1,666 m (5,466 ft) high, which has erupted relatively frequently since the last ice age. The most recent major eruptions occurred in 920, 1612, and from 1821 to 1823. Previous eruptions of Eyjafjallajökull have been followed by eruptions at its larger neighbour, Katla. On 20 April 2010 Icelandic President Ólafur Grímsson said, "the time for Katla to erupt is coming close ... we [Iceland] have prepared ... it is high time for European governments and airline authorities all over the world to start planning for the eventual Katla eruption."

The volcanic events starting in March 2010 were considered to be a single eruption divided into phases. The first eruption phase ejected olivine basaltic andesite lava several hundred metres into the air in what is known as an effusive eruption. Ash ejection from this phase of the eruption was small, rising to no more than 4 km (13,000 ft) into the atmosphere.

On 14 April 2010, however, the eruption entered an explosive phase and ejected fine glass-rich ash to over 8 km (26,000 ft) into the atmosphere. The second phase was estimated to be a VEI 4 eruption, which was large, but not nearly the most powerful eruption possible by volcanic standards. By way of comparison, the Mount St. Helens eruption of 1980 was rated as 5 on the VEI, and the 1991 eruption of Mount Pinatubo was rated as a 6. This second phase erupted trachyandesite.

This volcanic activity was highly disruptive to air travel because of a combination of factors:

1. The volcano is directly under the jet stream.
2. The direction of the jet stream was unusually stable at the time of the eruption's second phase, continuously southeast.
3. The second eruptive phase happened under 200 m (660 ft) of glacial ice. The resulting meltwater flowed back into the erupting volcano, which created two specific phenomena:
  1. The rapidly vaporising water significantly increased the eruption's explosive power.
  2. The erupting lava cooled very fast, which created a cloud of highly abrasive, glass-rich ash.
4. The volcano's explosive power was enough to inject ash directly into the jet stream.

== Public observations ==
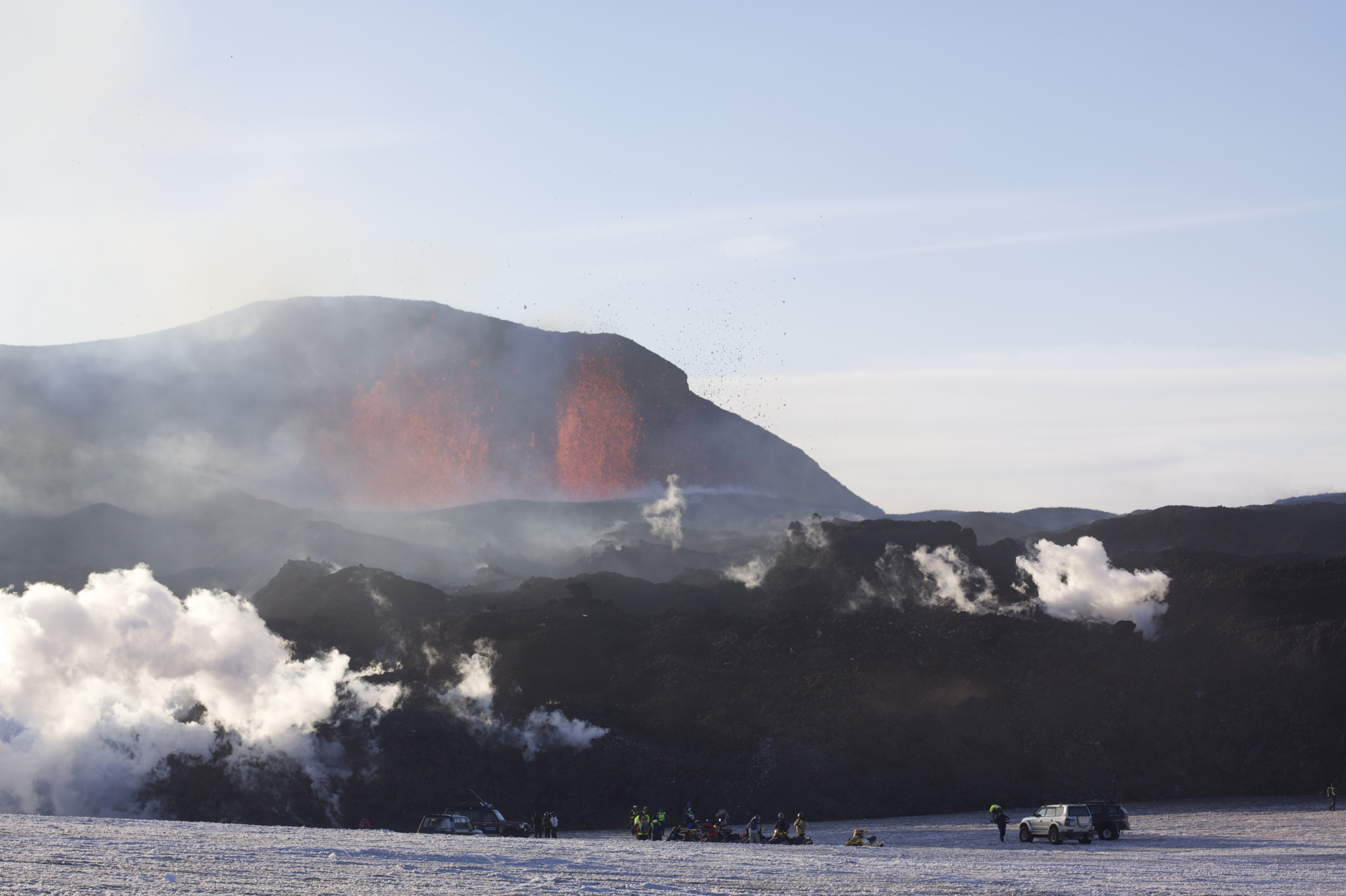
People observing the first fissure at Fimmvörðuháls

"Volcano tourism" quickly sprang up in the wake of the eruption, with local tour companies offering day trips to see the volcano. The Civil Protection Department of the Icelandic Police produced regular reports about access to the area, including a map of the restricted area around Eyjafjallajokull, from which the public was forbidden. Teams from the Icelandic Association for Search and Rescue were stationed at the eruption site as part of standard safety measures and to assist in enforcing access restrictions.

Vodafone and the Icelandic telecommunications company Míla installed webcams, giving views of the eruption from Valahnúkur, Hvolsvöllur, and Þórólfsfell. The view of the eruption from Þórólfsfel also includes a thermal imaging camera.

== Scientific observations ==
The London Volcanic Ash Advisory Centre (VAAC), part of the UK Met Office, was responsible for forecasting the presence of volcanic ash in the north-east Atlantic. All ash dispersion models for this geographic region were produced by the VAAC in London.

A study by the Icelandic Meteorological Office published in December 2009 indicated an increase in seismic activity around the Eyjafjallajökull area during the years 2006–2009. The study reported increased activity that occurred between June and August 2009 (200 events), compared to a total of about 250 earthquakes recorded between September 2006 and August 2009. It further indicated that the locations of most of the earthquakes in 2009 occurred between 8 and 12 km (26,000 and 39,000 ft) depth east of the volcano's top crater. At the end of December 2009, seismic activity began around the Eyjafjallajökull volcano area, with thousands of small earthquakes (mostly of magnitude 1–2 M_{w}), 7 to 10 km (23,000 to 33,000 ft) beneath the volcano.

The radar stations of the Meteorological Institute of Iceland did not detect any appreciable amount of volcanic ashfall during the first 24 hours of the eruption. However, during the night of 22 March, they reported some volcanic ash fall reaching the Fljótshlíð area (20 to 25 km or 12 to 16 mi northwest of the eruption's location) and Hvolsvöllur town (40 kilometres (25 mi) northwest of the eruption location) leaving vehicles with a fine, grey layer of volcanic ash. At around 07:00 on 22 March, an explosion launched eruption columns which reached altitudes of 4 km (2.5 mi). This was the highest plume since the eruption started. On 23 March, a small vapour explosion took place, when hot magma came into contact with nearby snowdrifts, emitting a vapour plume which reached an altitude of 7 km (23,000 ft), and was detected on radar from the Meteorological Institute of Iceland. After that, many further vapour explosions occurred.

By 26 March 2010, the global positioning system (GPS) equipment used by the Iceland Meteorological Office at Þorvaldseyri farm in the Eyjafjöll area (around 15 km or 9.3 mi southeast of the location of the recent eruption) had shown 3 cm (1.2 in) of displacement of the local crust in a southward direction, of which a 1 cm (0.39 in) displacement had taken place within four days.

This unusual seismic activity, along with the rapid movement of the Earth's crust in the area, gave geophysicists evidence that magma was flowing from underneath the crust into Eyjafjallajökull's magma chamber and that pressure stemming from the process caused the crustal displacement at Þorvaldseyri farm. The seismic activity continued to increase, and from 3 to 5 March, close to 3,000 earthquakes were measured having their epicentre at the volcano. Most of these were too small (magnitude 2) to be interpreted as precursors to an eruption, but some could be detected in nearby towns.

The grounding of European flights avoided about 3.44×10^{8} kg of CO_{2} emissions per day, while the volcano emitted about 1.5×10^{8} kg of CO_{2} per day.

== Phase 1: Effusive eruption ==
The first phase of the eruption lasted from 20 March to 12 April 2010 and was characterised by olivine basaltic andesite lava flowing from various eruptive vents on the flanks of the mountain.

=== Evacuations ===
About 500 farmers and their families had to escape from the areas of Fljótshlíð, Eyjafjöll, and Landeyjar were evacuated overnight (including a group of 30 schoolchildren and their three teachers from Caistor Grammar School in England), and flights to and from Reykjavík and Keflavík International Airport were postponed, but on the evening of 21 March, domestic and international air traffic was allowed again. Inhabitants of the risk zone of Fljótshlíð, Eyjafjöll, and Landeyjar area were allowed to return to their farms and homes after an evening meeting with the Civil Protection Department on 22 March and the evacuation plan was temporarily dismissed. Instead, the police closed the road to Þórsmörk and the four-wheel-drive trail from Skógar village to the Fimmvörðuháls mountain pass, but these roads and trails were reopened on 29 March, though only for suitable four-wheel drive vehicles. When the second fissure appeared, the road was closed again because of the danger of flash floods, which could have developed if the fissure had opened near big ice caps or other snow reservoirs, but the road was again opened at around noon on 1 April.

=== Effects on the river ===
On 22 March, a flow meter device in the Krossá glacial river (which drains Eyjafjallajökull and Mýrdalsjökull glaciers) in the Þórsmörk area (a few kilometres north-west of the erupting location) started to record a sudden rise in water level and water temperature – the total water temperature rose by 6 °C (11 °F) over a two-hour period, which had never happened so quickly in the Krossá river since measurements began. Shortly afterward, the water level returned to normal and water temperature decreased. This rise in water temperature was thought to be related to the eruption nearby and was affecting part of the Krossá drainage basin. The temperature of Hruná river, which flows through the narrow Hrunárgil canyon, into which part of the lava stream was flowing, was recently recorded by geologists to be between 50 and 60 °C (122 and 140 °F), indicating that the river was cooling the lava in that canyon.

=== Fissure ===
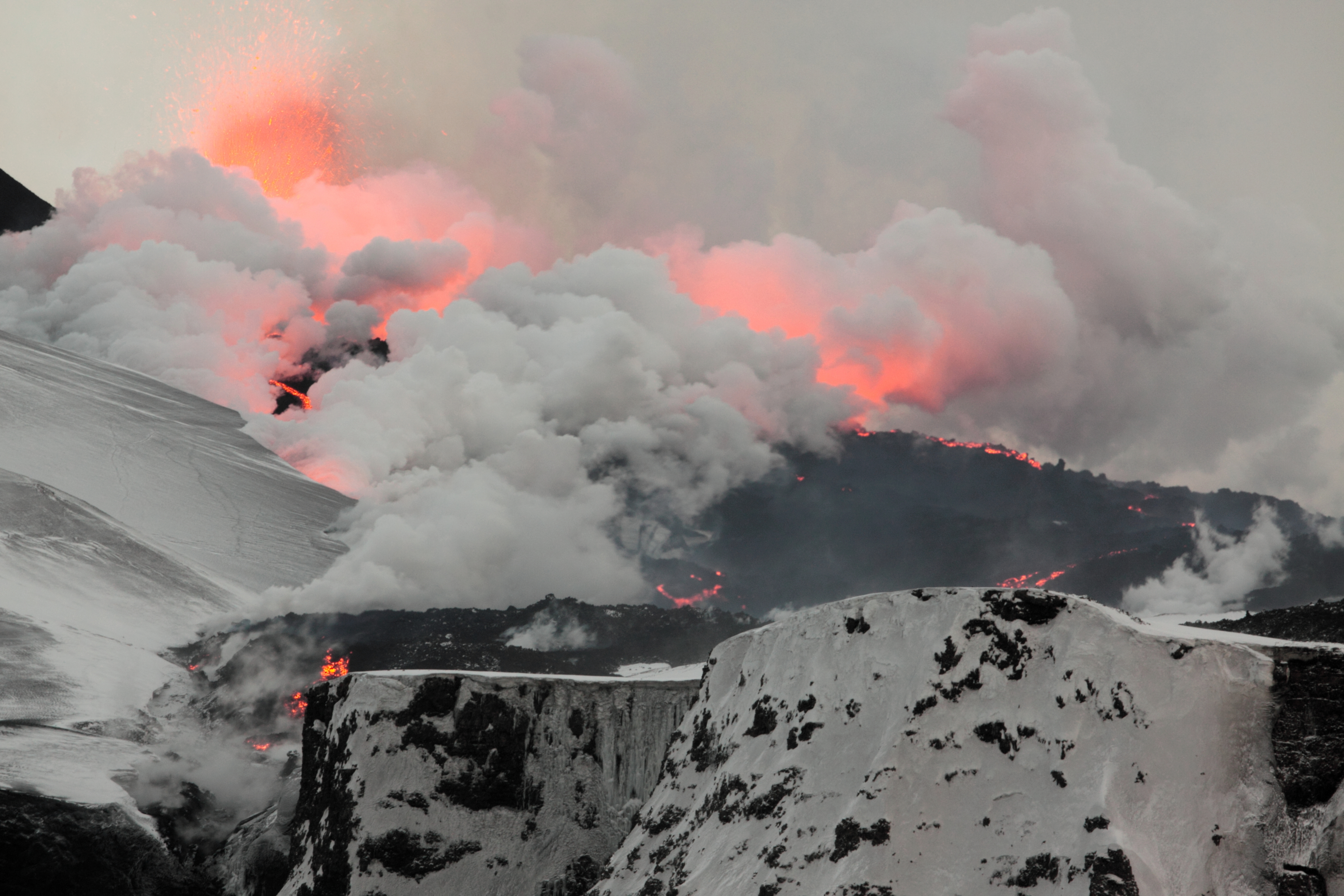
Second fissure, viewed from the north, on 2 April 2010

The first phase of the 2010 eruption began late on the evening of 20 March at the Eyjafjallajökull.

The initial visual report of the eruption was at 23:52 GMT, when a red cloud was seen at the north slopes of Fimmvörðuháls mountain pass, lighting up the sky above the eruptive site. The eruption was preceded by intense seismicity and high rates of deformation in the weeks before the eruption, in association with magma recharging of the volcano. Immediately before the eruption, the depth of the seismicity had become shallow, but was not significantly enhanced from what it had been in the previous weeks. Deformation was occurring at rates up to a centimetre a day since 4 March at various GPS sites installed within 12 km (7.5 mi) from the eruptive site.

A fissure opened up about 150 metres (490 ft) in length running in a north-east to south-west direction, with 10 to 12 erupting lava craters ejecting lava at a temperature around 1,000 °C (1,800 °F) up to 150 m (490 ft) into the air. The lava was alkali olivine basalt and was relatively viscous, causing the motion of the lava stream to the west and east of the fissure to be slow. The molten lava flowed more than 4,000 m (13,000 ft) to the north-east of the fissure and into Hrunagil canyon, forming a lava fall more than 200 m (660 ft) long and slowly approaching Þórsmörk, but had not yet reached the flood plains of Krossá.

On 25 March 2010, while studying the eruption, scientists witnessed, for the first time in history, the formation of a pseudocrater during a steam explosion. Crustal expansion continued at Þorvaldseyri for two days after the eruption began, but was slowly decreasing whilst the volcanic activity was increasing. This indicates that the rate at which magma was flowing into the magma chamber roughly equaled the rate at which it was being lost due to the eruption, giving evidence that this phase of volcanic activity reached equilibrium.

A new fissure opened on 31 March, around 200 m (700 ft) northwest of the original fissure. Many witnesses were present while the new fissure opened. It was a bit smaller, around 300 m (1,000 ft) long according to witnesses, and lava coming from it started to flow into Hvannárgil canyon. These two erupting fissures shared the same magma chamber, according to geophysicists. No unusual seismic activity was detected at the time the new fissure appeared, nor any crustal expansion according to many seismometers and GPS recorders situated in nearby areas.

Geophysicist Magnús Tumi Einarsson said (at a press meeting in Hvolsvöllur on 21 March) that this eruption was small compared to, for example, the eruption of Hekla in 2000. The eruption, rather than taking place under the ice cap of the glacier, occurred in the mountain pass between the Eyjafjallajökull and Mýrdalsjökull glaciers. As long as the fissure was not near the glacier, the risk of flooding was minimal; however, the fissure could extend into the ice cap, thereby greatly increasing the risk of flooding.

== Phase 2: Explosive eruption ==
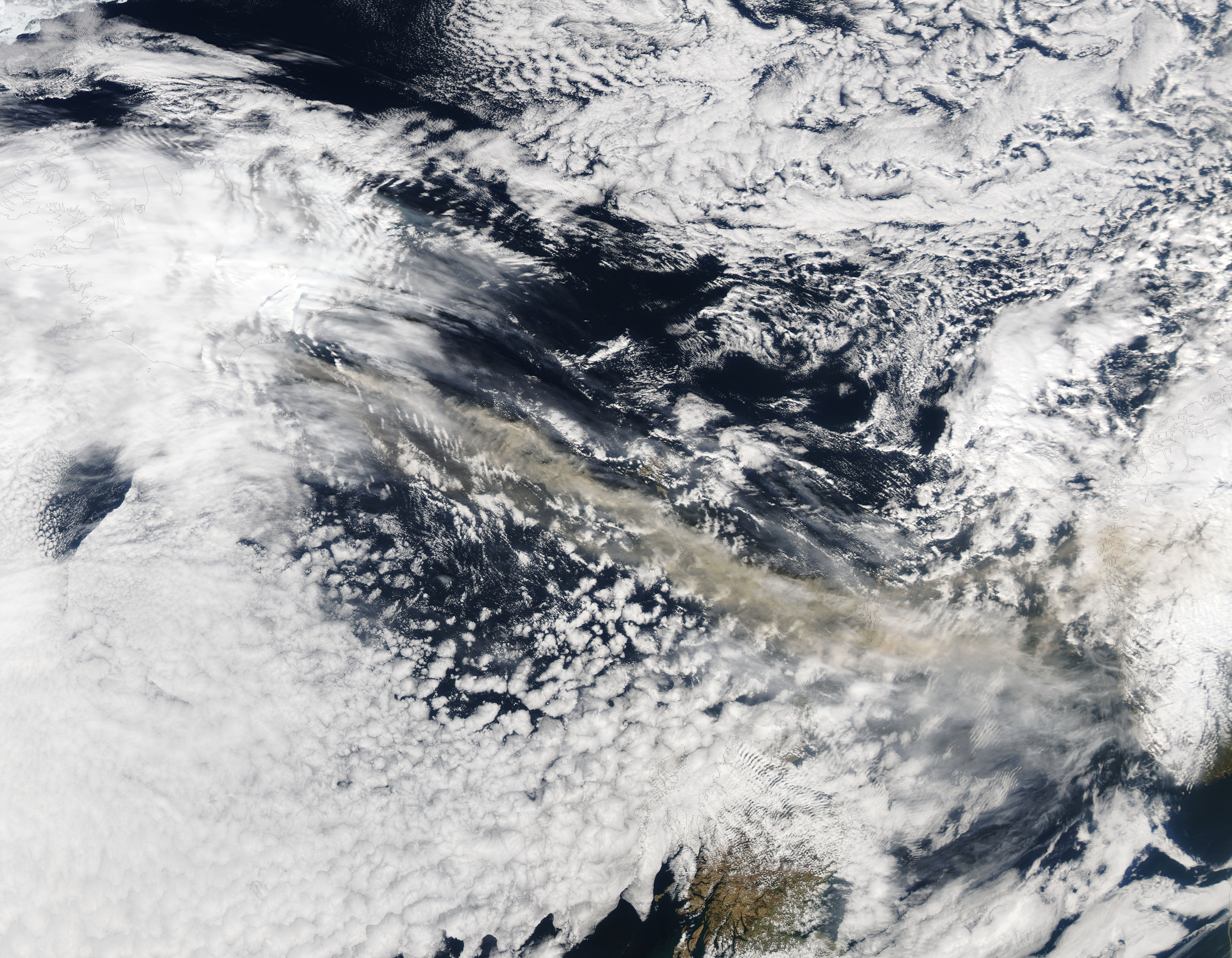
Photograph from satellite Aqua showing the ash plume over North Atlantic at 13:30 GMT on 15 April

The estimated ash cloud at 18:00 GMT on 15 April.

After a short hiatus in eruptive activity, and a large increase in seismic activity 23:00 on 13 April and 1:00 on 14 April, a new set of craters opened early in the morning of 14 April 2010 under the volcano's ice-covered central summit caldera. The earthquake swarm was followed by the onset of a seismic eruption tremor. Meltwater started to emanate from the ice cap around 07:00 on 14 April and an eruption plume was observed in the early morning. Visual observations were greatly restricted due to cloud cover over the volcano, but an aeroplane of the Icelandic Coast Guard imaged eruptive craters with radar instruments. A series of vents along a two-kilometre-long north–south-oriented fissure was active, with meltwater flowing mostly down the northern slopes of the volcano, but also to the south. An ash-loaded eruption plume rose to more than 8 km (26,000 ft), deflected to the east by westerly winds.

=== Ash analysis ===
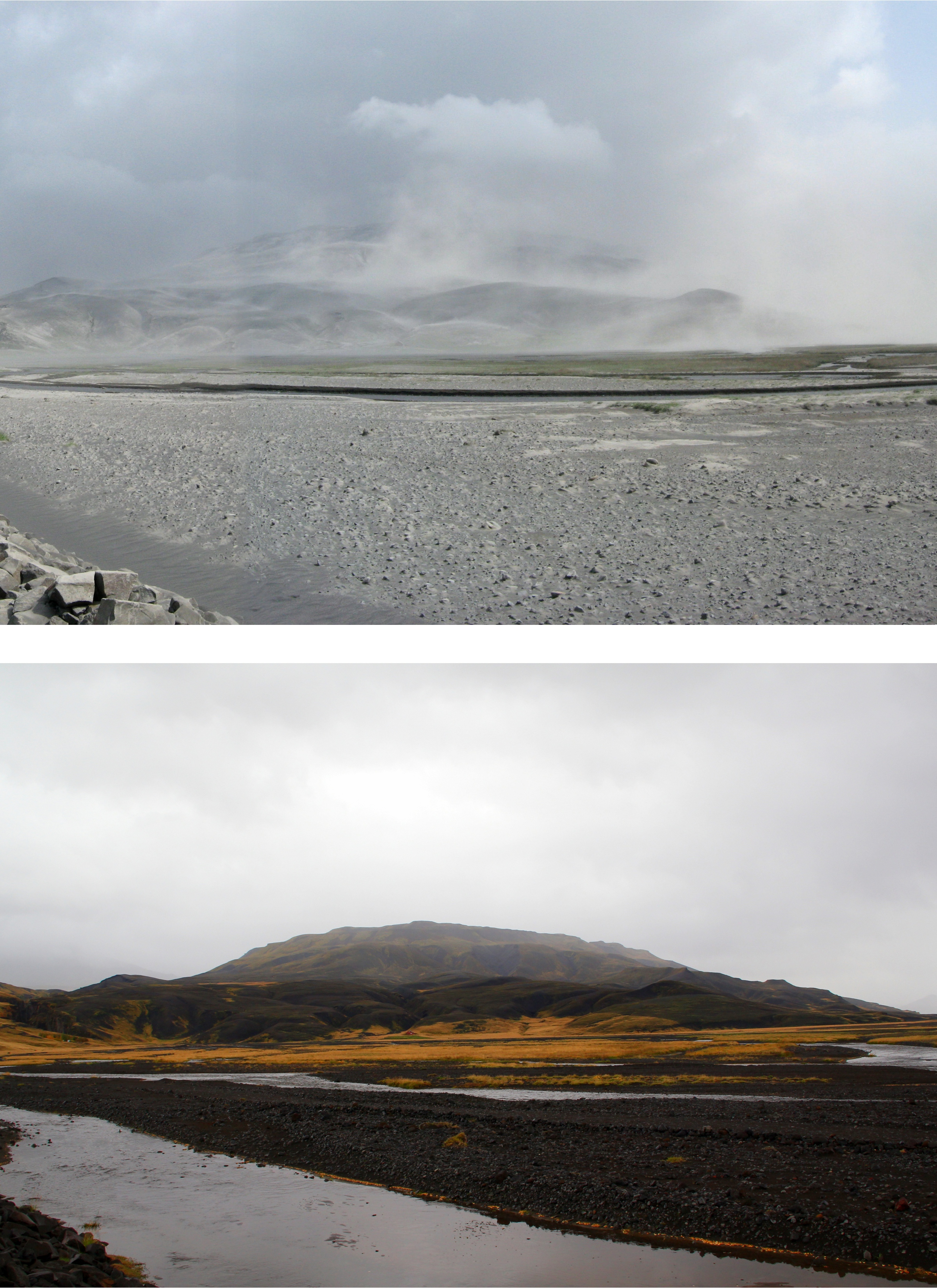
Upper: Ash covers the Thórsmörk valley in early June 2010, immediately after the eruption Lower: The same area, in September 2011

Samples of volcanic ash collected near the eruption showed a silica concentration of 58%—much higher than in the lava flows. The concentration of water-soluble fluoride was one-third of the concentration typical in Hekla eruptions, with a mean value of 104 mg of fluoride per kg of ash. Agriculture is important in this region of Iceland, and farmers near the volcano have been warned not to let their livestock drink from contaminated streams and water sources, as high concentrations of fluoride can have deadly renal and hepatic effects, particularly in sheep.

=== Impact on farming ===
The Icelandic Food and Veterinary Authority released an announcement on 18 April 2010, asking that all horse owners who keep their herds outside be on the alert for ash fall. Where ash fall was significant, all horses had to be sheltered indoors. The thick layer of ash that had fallen on some Icelandic pastures and farms at Raufarfell had become wet and compact, making it very difficult to continue farming, harvesting, or grazing livestock.

=== Timeline of the second eruption phase ===
Unlike the earlier eruption phase, the second phase occurred beneath glacial ice. Cold water from melted ice quickly chilled the lava, causing it to fragment into highly abrasive glass particles that were then carried into the eruption plume. This, together with the magnitude of the eruption (estimated to be VEI 4) and being 10 to 20 times larger than the eruption of Fimmvörðuháls on 20 March, injected a glass-rich ash plume into the jet stream. Pulsating explosive activity on 17 April 2010, able to be observed because of the fine weather, was later understood to be due to periodic clogging/plugging of the conduit associated with the rise and degassing of more magma.

In addition to volcanic ash being very hazardous to aircraft, the location of this eruption directly under the flow of the jet stream ensured that the ash was carried into the heavily used airspace over northern and central Europe.

== Phase 3: Return to dormancy ==
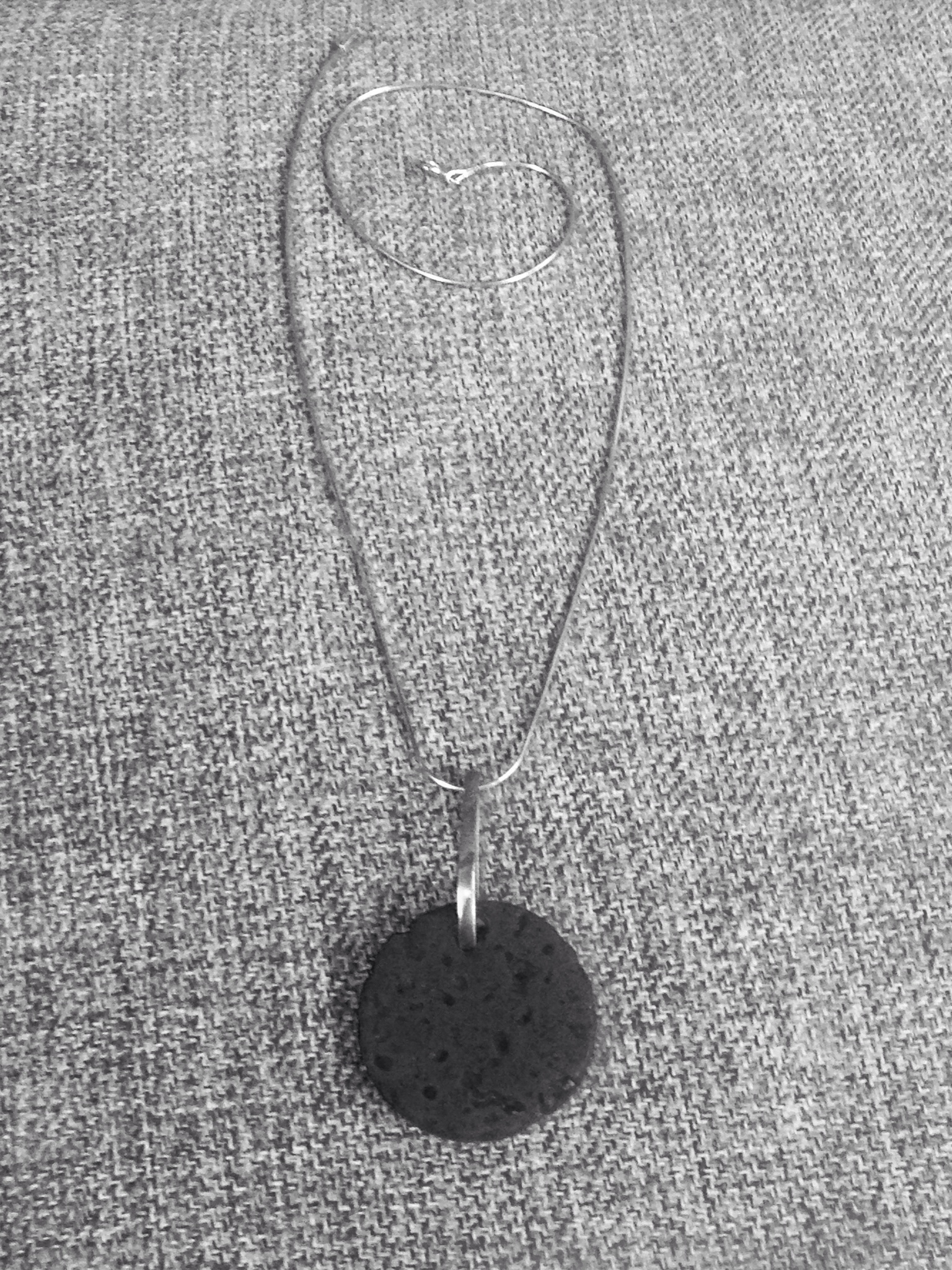
A necklace made from the ash of the 2010 eruption: Jewellery and similar memorabilia of the eruption are now sold in Iceland.

By the morning of 24 May 2010, the view from the web camera installed on Þórólfsfell showed only a plume of water vapour surrounded by a bluish haze caused by emission of sulphurous gases. Due to the large quantities of dry volcanic ash lying on the ground, surface winds frequently lifted up an "ash mist" that significantly reduced visibility and made web camera observation of the volcano impossible.

On 21 June 2010, data from seismic recorders in the area indicated that the frequency and strength of earth tremors had diminished, but were continuing.

In October 2010, Ármann Höskuldsson, a scientist at the University of Iceland Institute of Earth Sciences, stated that the eruption was officially over, although the area was still geothermally active and might erupt again.

During the eruption, as news readers found the name "Eyjafjallajökull" difficult to pronounce a pronunciation guide was published by the BBC.

== Volume of erupted material and magma discharge ==
The Institute of Earth Sciences made a preliminary estimate of erupted material in the first three days of the eruption on 14 April 2010 at Eyjafjallajökull. The erupted products were fragmented material, the majority fine-grained airborne tephra. Eruptive products can be split into three categories along with preliminary estimated erupted volumes:

1. Material (tephra) in the ice cauldrons around the volcanic vents: 30 million cubic metres (39,000,000 cu yd)
2. Tephra filling the glacial lagoon of Gígjökulslón, carried by floods down the outlet glacier Gígjökull: 10 million cubic metres (13,000,000 cu yd)
3. Airborne tephra that was carried to the east and south of the volcano, uncompacted tephra fallout from eruption plume: 100 million cubic metres (130,000,000 cu yd)

Total: 140 million cubic metres (180,000,000 cu yd) which corresponds to some 70–80 million cubic metres (92,000,000–105,000,000 cu yd) of magma. The magma discharge rate was about 300 cubic metres per second (11,000 cu ft/s) or 750 t/s. This was 10–20 times the average discharge rate in the preceding flank eruption at Fimmvörðuháls. (First eruption on 20 March 2010).

The IES updated the eruption flow rate on 21 April 2010 to an estimation less than 30 cubic metres per second (1,100 cu ft/s) of magma, or 75 t/s, with a large uncertainty. IES also noted that the eruption continue with less explosive activity.

== Health effects ==
No human fatalities were reported from the 2010 eruption of Eyjafjallajökull. Those who lived near the volcano had high levels of irritation symptoms, though their lung function was not lower than expected. Six months later, the population living in the area had more respiratory symptoms than a control group from North Iceland, with no ashfall. In Scotland, the number of phone calls to health services for respiratory and eye irritation did not rise significantly.

== Effects of the ash plume on air travel ==
Volcanic ash is a major hazard to aircraft. Smoke and ash from eruptions reduce visibility for visual navigation, and microscopic debris in the ash can sandblast windscreens and melt in the heat of aircraft turbine engines, damaging engines and making them shut down. Many flights within, to, and from Europe were cancelled following 14 April 2010 eruption, and although no commercial aircraft were damaged, the engines of some military aircraft were harmed. The presence and location of the plume depends upon the state of the eruption and the winds. While some ash fell on uninhabited areas in Iceland, most had been carried by westerly winds, resulting in the shutdown of airspace over much of Europe. The shutdown had a knock on impact on the economy and cultural events across Europe. The Icelandic flag carrier airline, Icelandair, seemed at first especially vulnerable, but managed to deal effectively with the eruption, and subsequently published a detailed report about its actions and conclusions.

== Short- and long-term weather and environmental effects ==
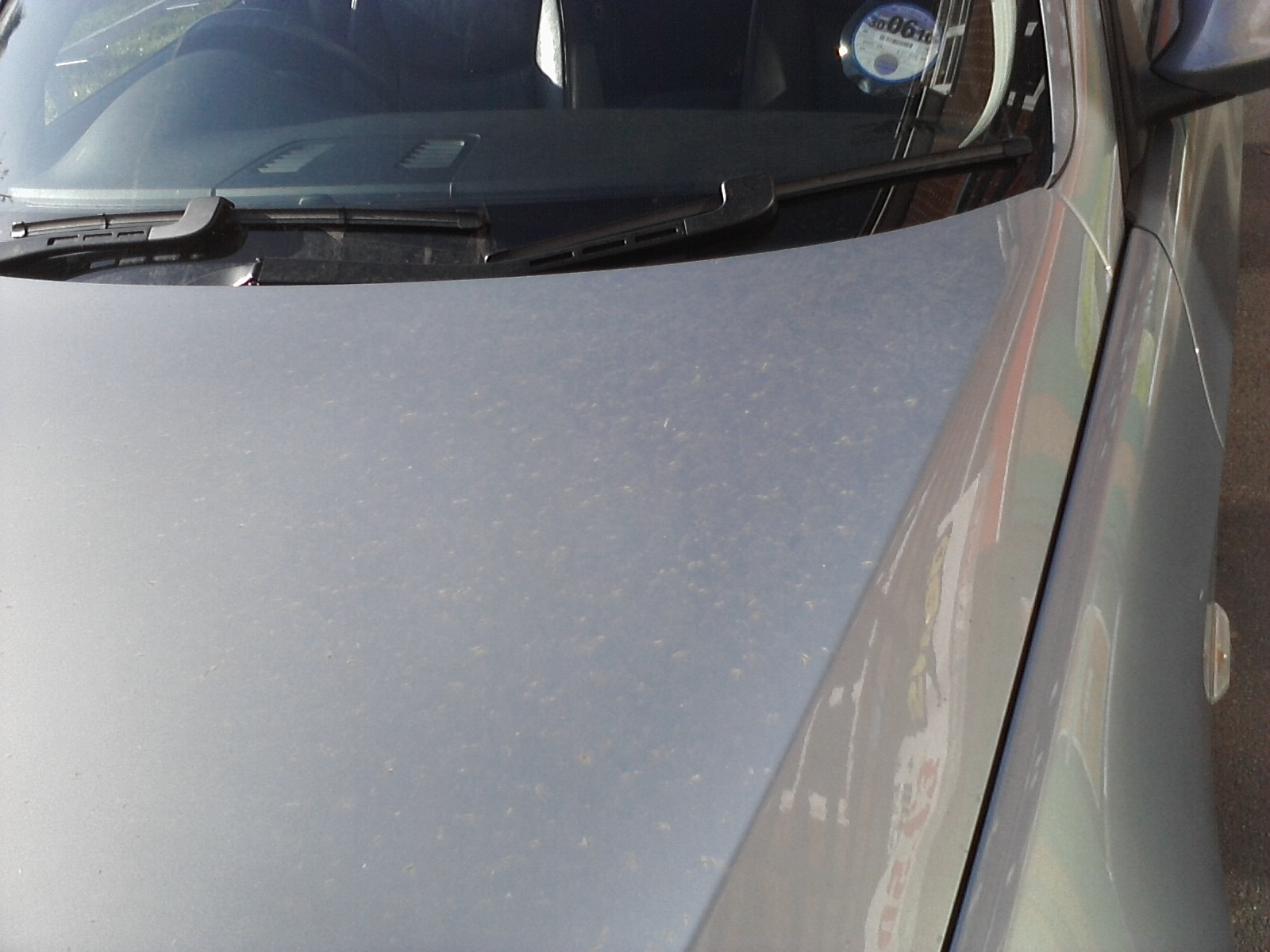
Possible ash fallout from Eyjafjallajökull on a car, Manchester, England, 21 April 2010

At the mouth of the crater, the gases, ejecta, and volcanic plume created a rare weather phenomenon known as volcanic lightning (or a "dirty thunderstorm"). When rocks and other ejecta collide with one another, they create static electricity. This, with the abundant water-ice at the summit, aids in making lightning.

High-fluoride Hekla eruptions from Iceland had previously posed a threat to foraging livestock, especially sheep. Fluoride poisoning can start in sheep at a diet with fluorine content of 5 to 10 mg/kg (8.0×10^{−5} to 0.000160 oz/lb) with the type of fluoride salts formed a factor in the toxicity. At 250 ppm, death can occur within a few days. In 1783, 79% of the Icelandic sheep stock were killed, probably as a result of fluorosis caused by the eruption of Laki. The effect also spread beyond Iceland. Later detailed analysis found that ash from the Eyjafjallajökull eruption varied in its fluoride content from between 843 and 1,297 mg/kg (0.02075 oz/lb) and had variation in salt compositional and time in the eruption sequence risk that was not understood at the time. Large-scale release of sulfur dioxide into the troposphere also posed a potential health risk, as English reports of the 1783 eruption noted that it causing a fog of sulfur dioxide mixed with water vapour that in the lungs choked farm labourers.

As of 15 April, the eruption was not large enough to have an effect on global temperatures like that of Mount Pinatubo and other major past volcanic eruptions. One previous related sequence of eruptions of this volcano, beginning in 1821 is recorded as having lasted for over two years, but no single set of major eruptions is known to have lasted more than 'several days'.

== Comparison to past eruptions ==
The eruptions of Eyjafjallajökull and the largest ash plume associated with the second eruption phase were not unparalleled in either volume or abundance; however, the location was the critical factor because it affected air travel across Europe. Neither phase of the eruption was unusually powerful. Other notable volcanic eruptions include the eruption of Mount Pinatubo of 1991 of VEI 6. This eruption lasted eight days, from 7–15 June of that year, with an ash cloud that would have required additional days to dissipate, and resulted in worldwide abnormal weather and decrease in global temperature over the next few years. However, the second phase of Eyjafjallajökull's eruption lasted longer than that of Mount Pinatubo.

== In popular culture ==
- The eruptions were a key plot point of the 2013 French comedy Eyjafjallajökull.
- British-American rapper MF Doom references the eruptions in the opening lines of his song "Guv'nor", on his 2012 album Key to the Kuffs, with the line "Catch a throatful from the fire vocal, with ash and molten glass like Eyjafjallajökull".
- Writing for Time, Serbian performance artist Marina Abramović used Icelandic musician Björk's reverential reaction to the eruptions to praise her uniqueness as an artist.

== See also ==
- 2010 eruptions of Mount Merapi
- 2014–2015 eruption of Bárðarbunga
- Air travel disruption after the 2010 Eyjafjallajökull eruption
- British Airways Flight 9
- Effects of the April 2010 Eyjafjallajökull eruption
- KLM Flight 867
- Laki
- List of volcanoes in Iceland
- North Atlantic oscillation
- Timeline of volcanism on Earth
- Tuya
