= Seljavallalaug =

Outdoor pool in Iceland

Coordinates: 63°33′58.4″N 19°36′27.3″W

Seljavallalaug is a protected 25-metre outdoor pool in southern Iceland. The pool is one of the oldest swimming pools in Iceland and was built in 1923.

Seljavallalaug is located not far from Seljavellir. The construction was headed by Bjorn Andrésson Berjaneskoti, who received the Ungmennafélagið Eyfelling for the work. Courses in the pool were initiated as part of compulsory education in 1927. The pool is 25 metres long and 10 metres wide and was the largest pool in Iceland until 1936.

In 1990, a new pool about 2 km closer to the valley was built, but people can still go swimming in the old pool free of charge, but at their own risk. The pool is cleaned once every summer.

The 2010 eruptions of Eyjafjallajökull filled Seljavallalaug with ash. In early summer 2011, a group of volunteers gathered to clean the pool with loaders and excavators.

== Pictures ==
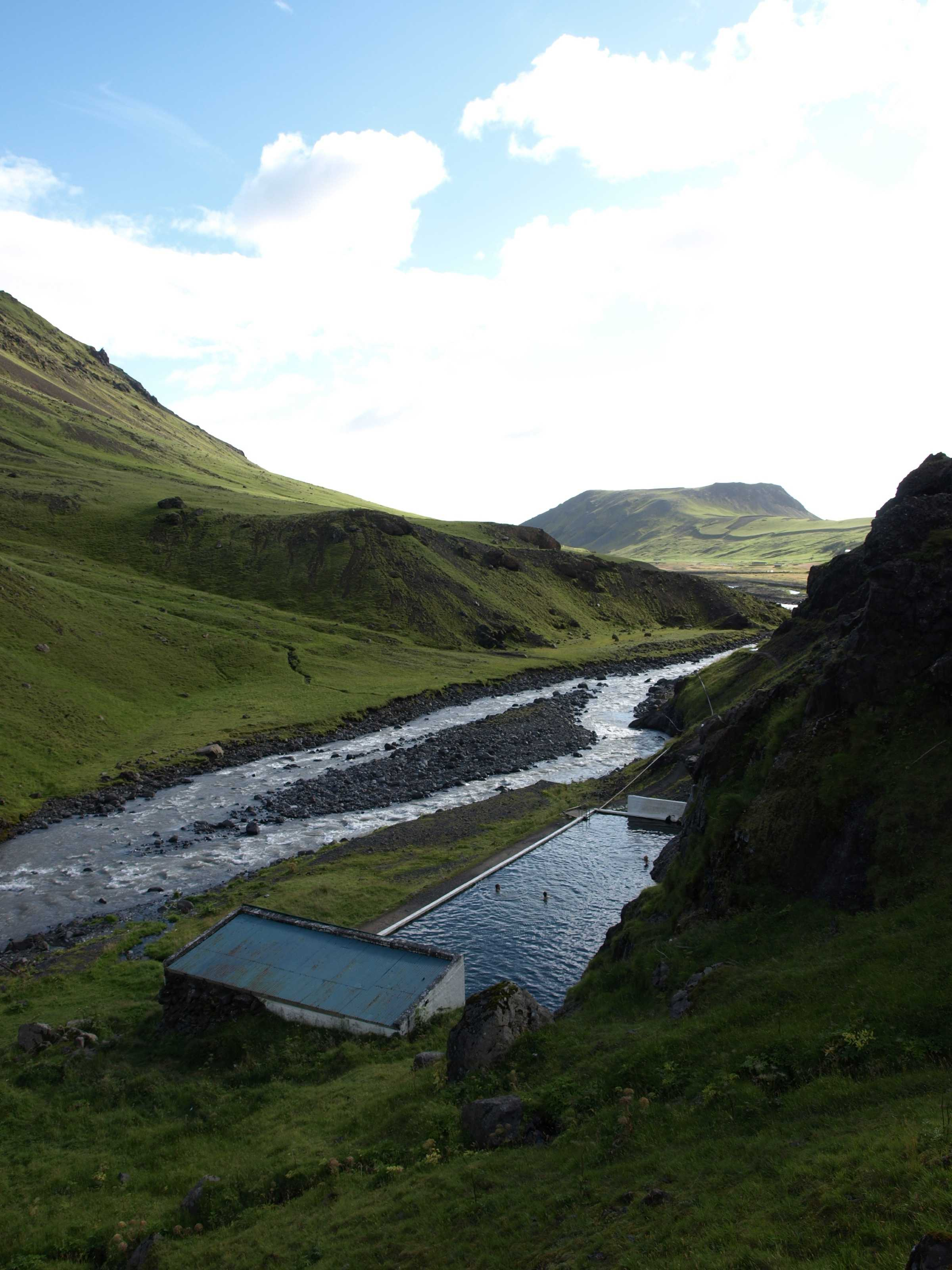

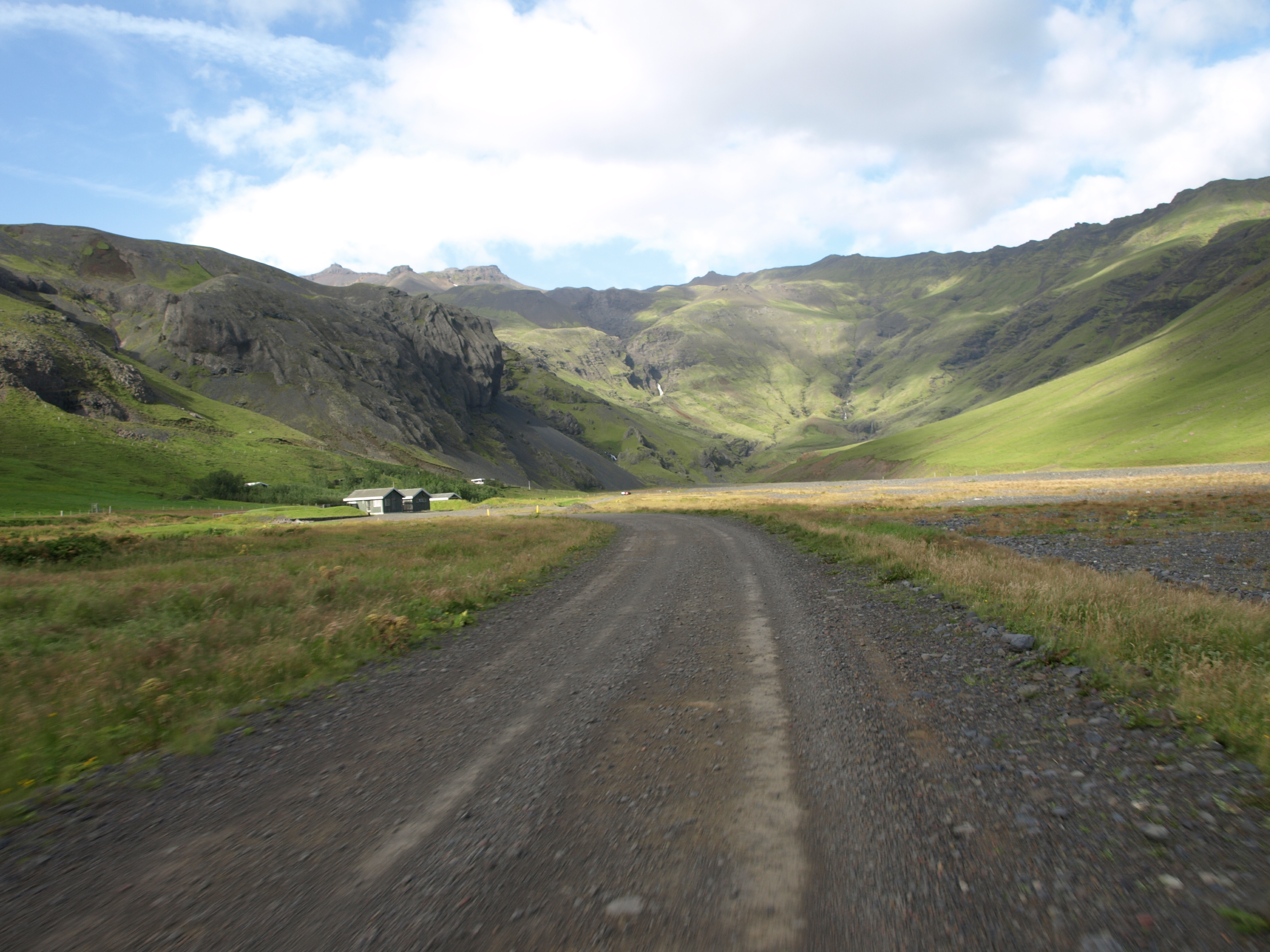

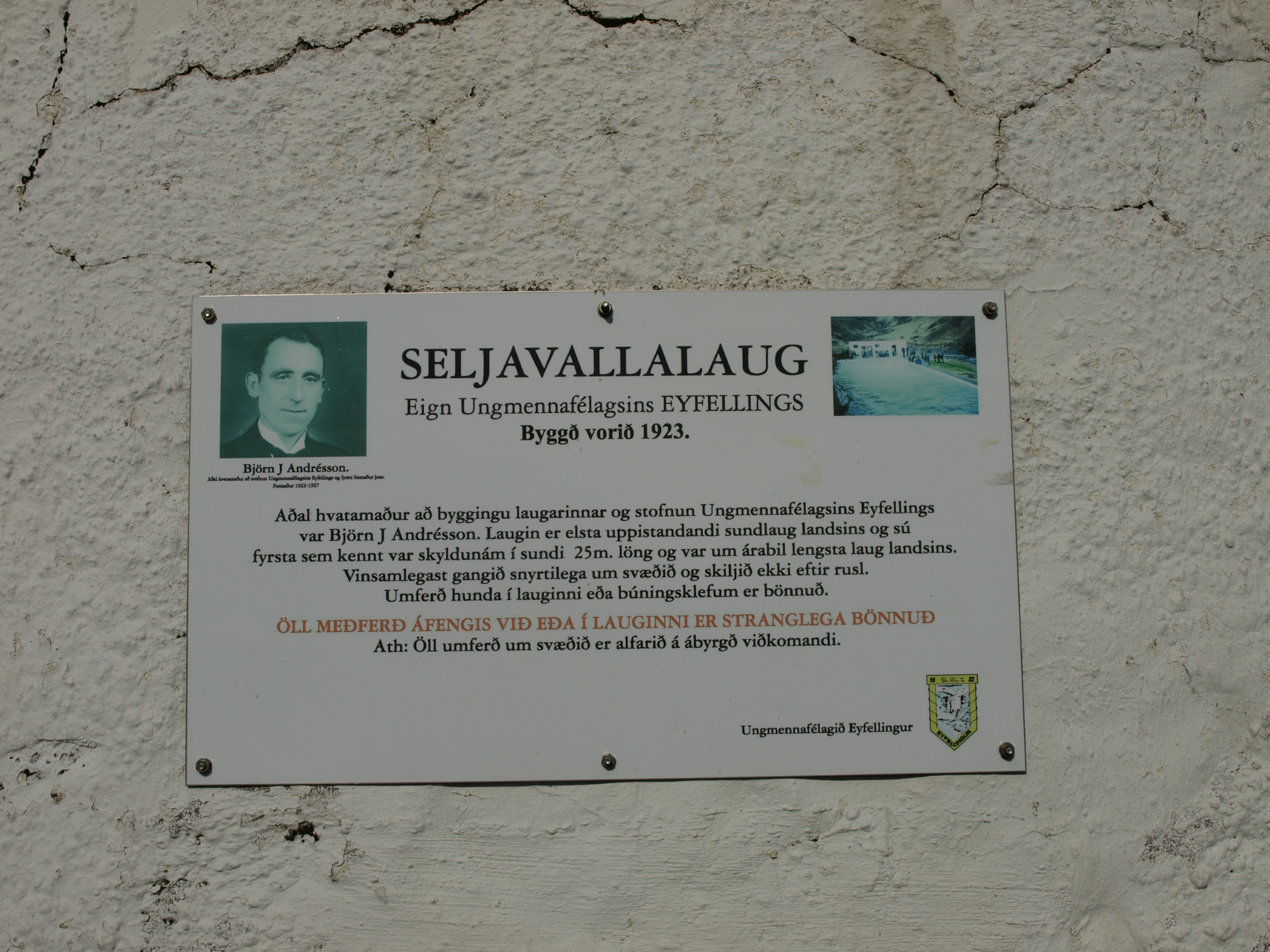

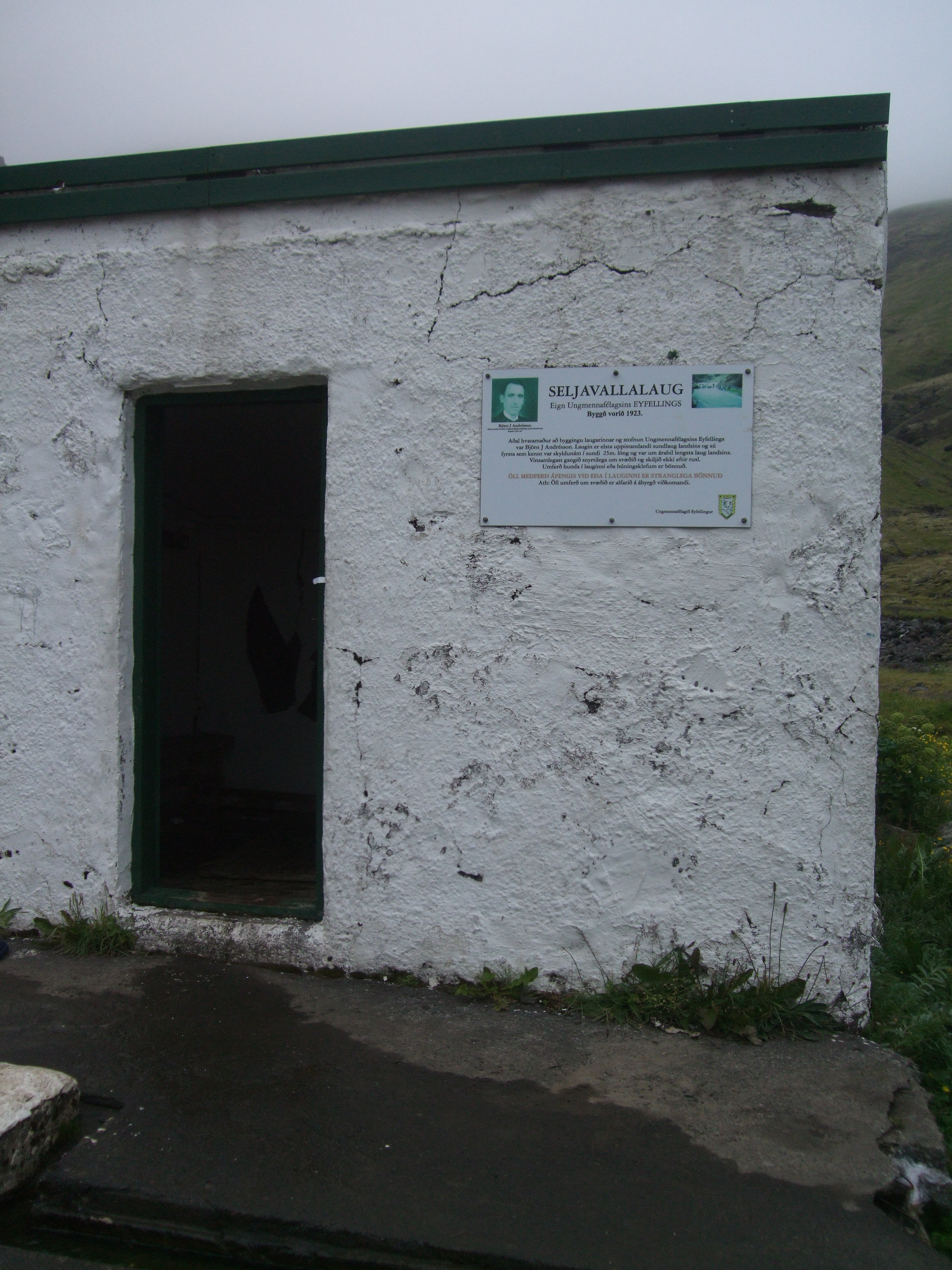

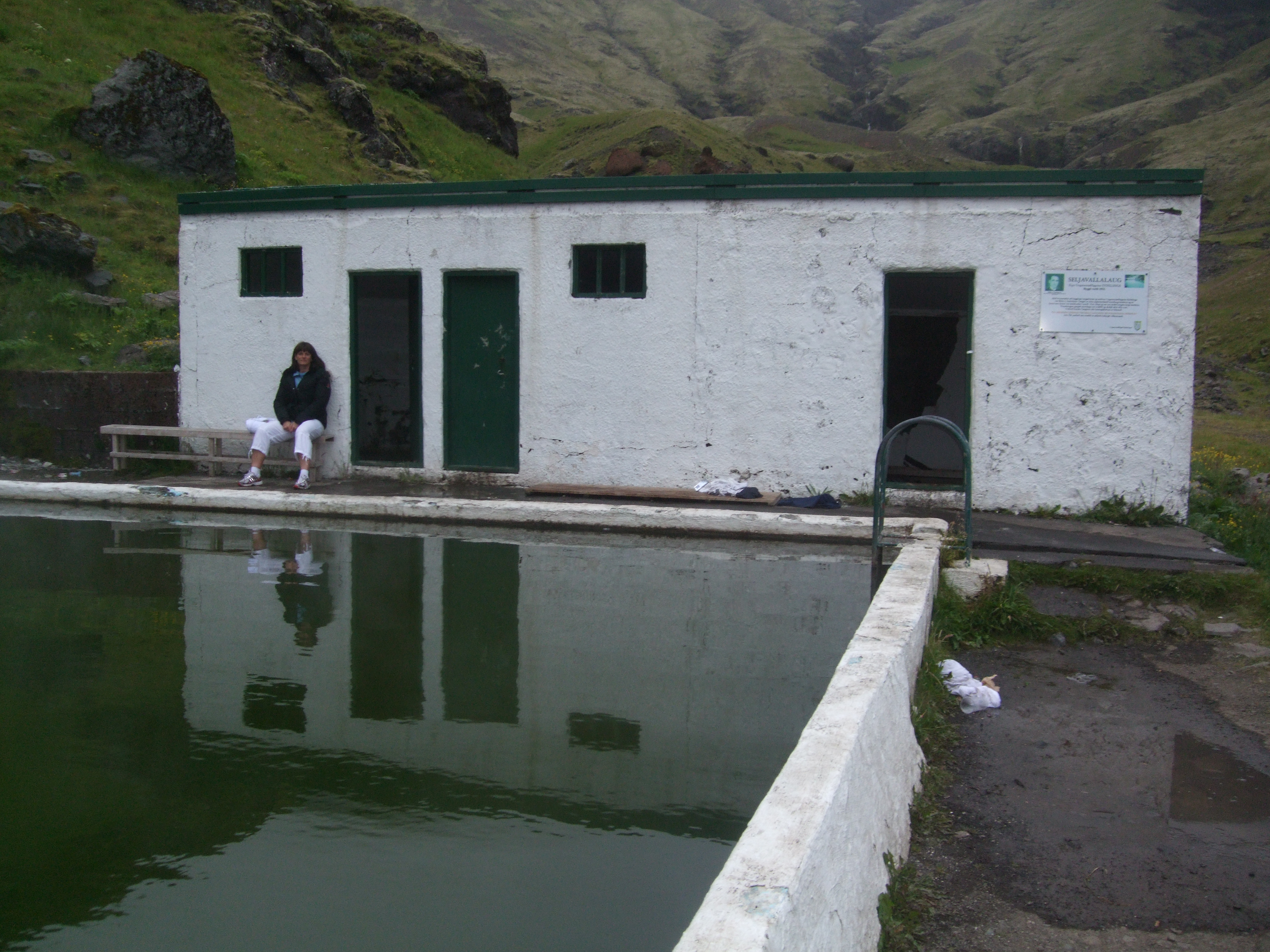

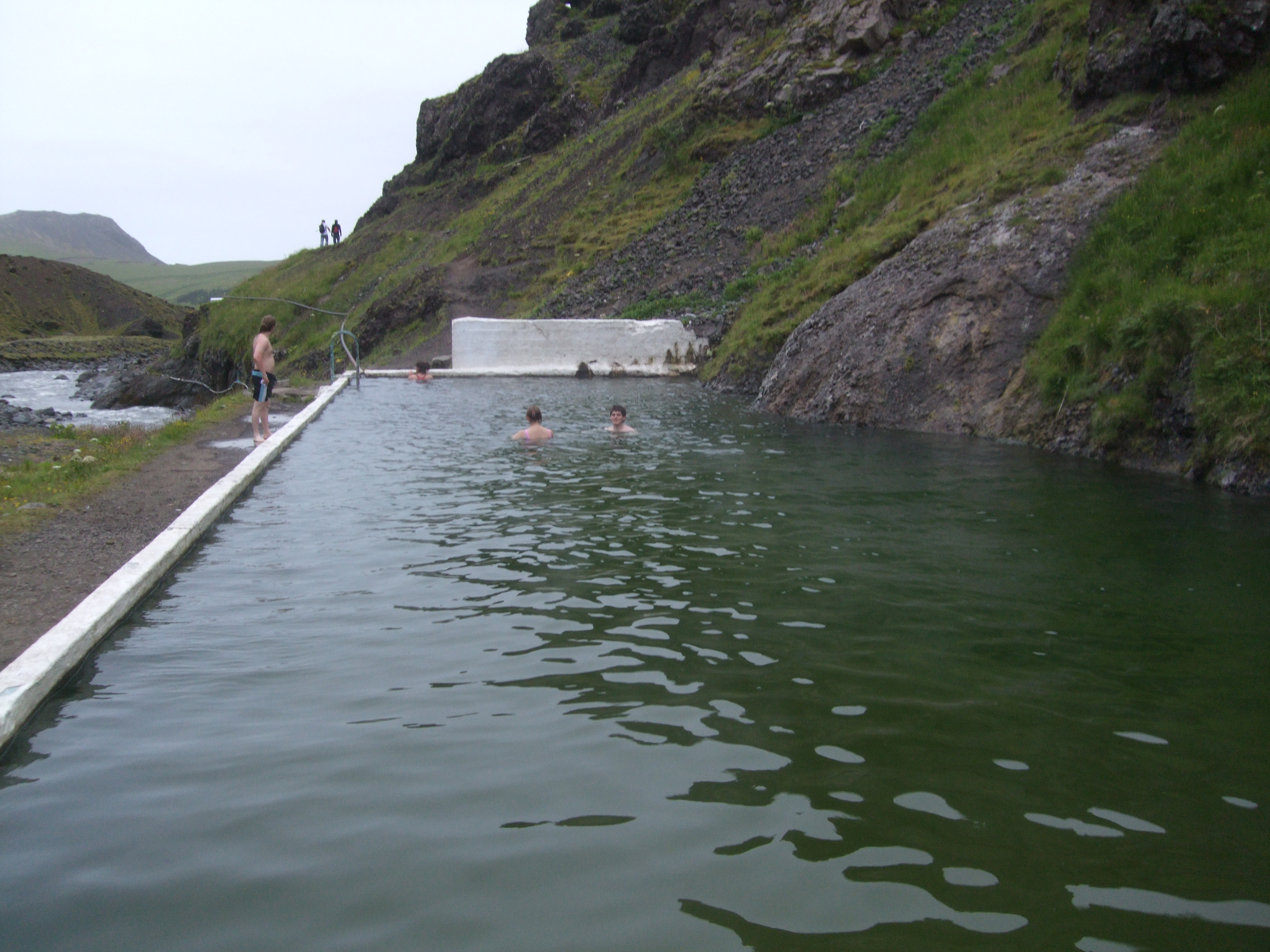

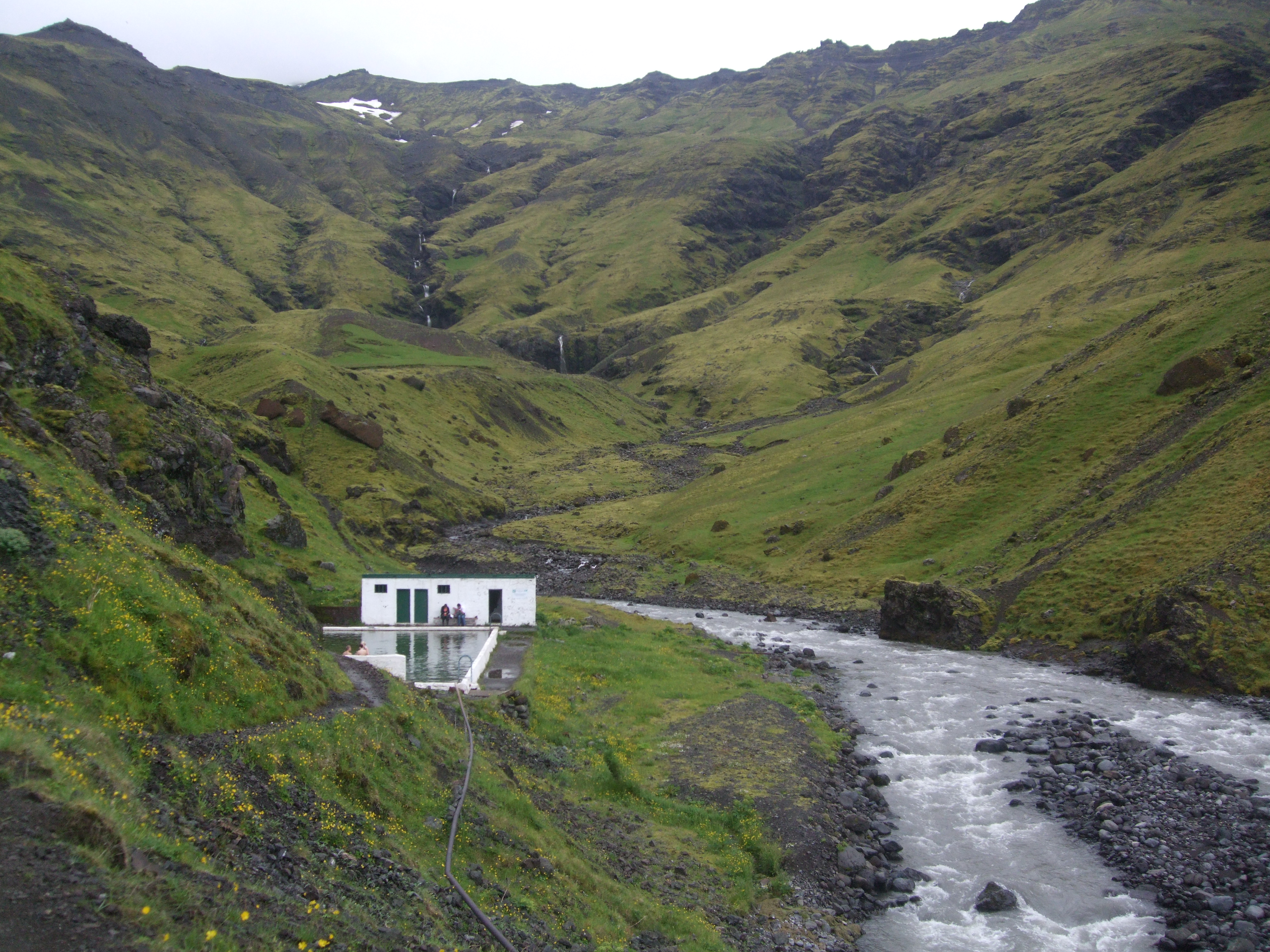
