= Thórsmörk =

Mountain ridge in Iceland

- Þórsmörk
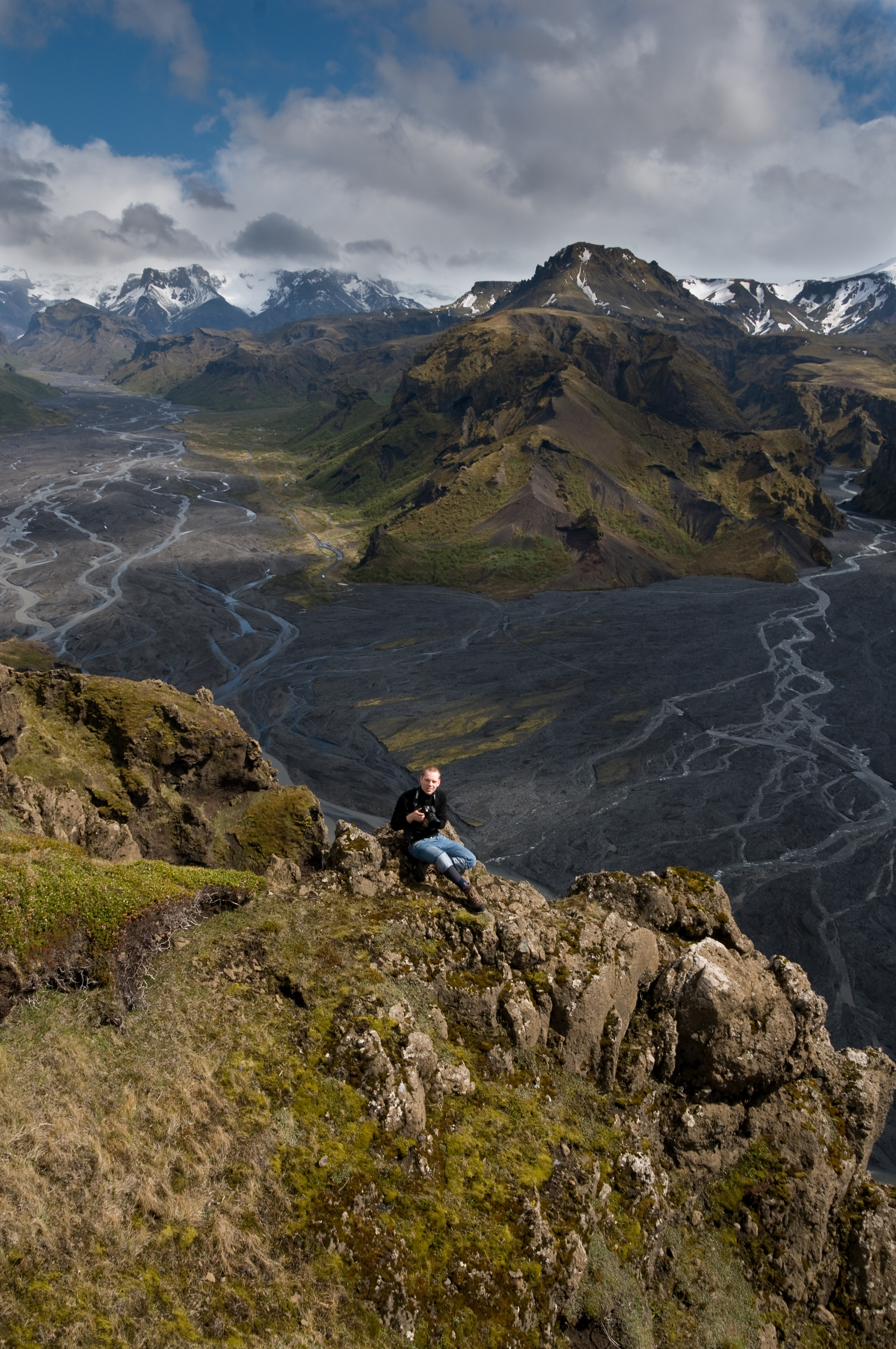
- Thórsmörk from Valahnúksból

- Location within Iceland

Geography
- Location: Iceland
- Coordinates: 63°40′51″N 19°28′57″W
- Interactive map of Thórsmörk

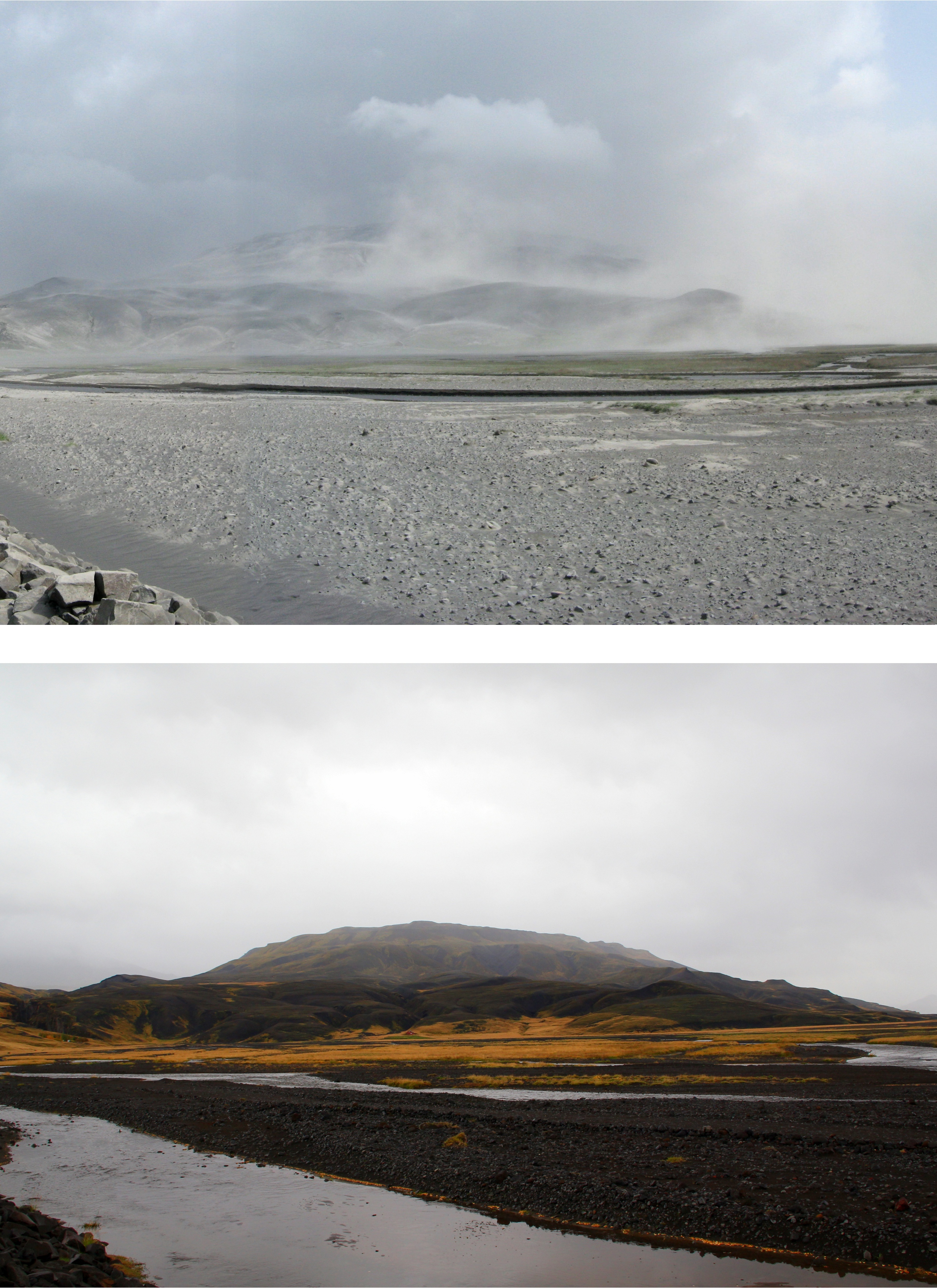
Upper: Ash covered the valley in early June 2010, immediately after the eruption. Lower: The same area, in September 2011

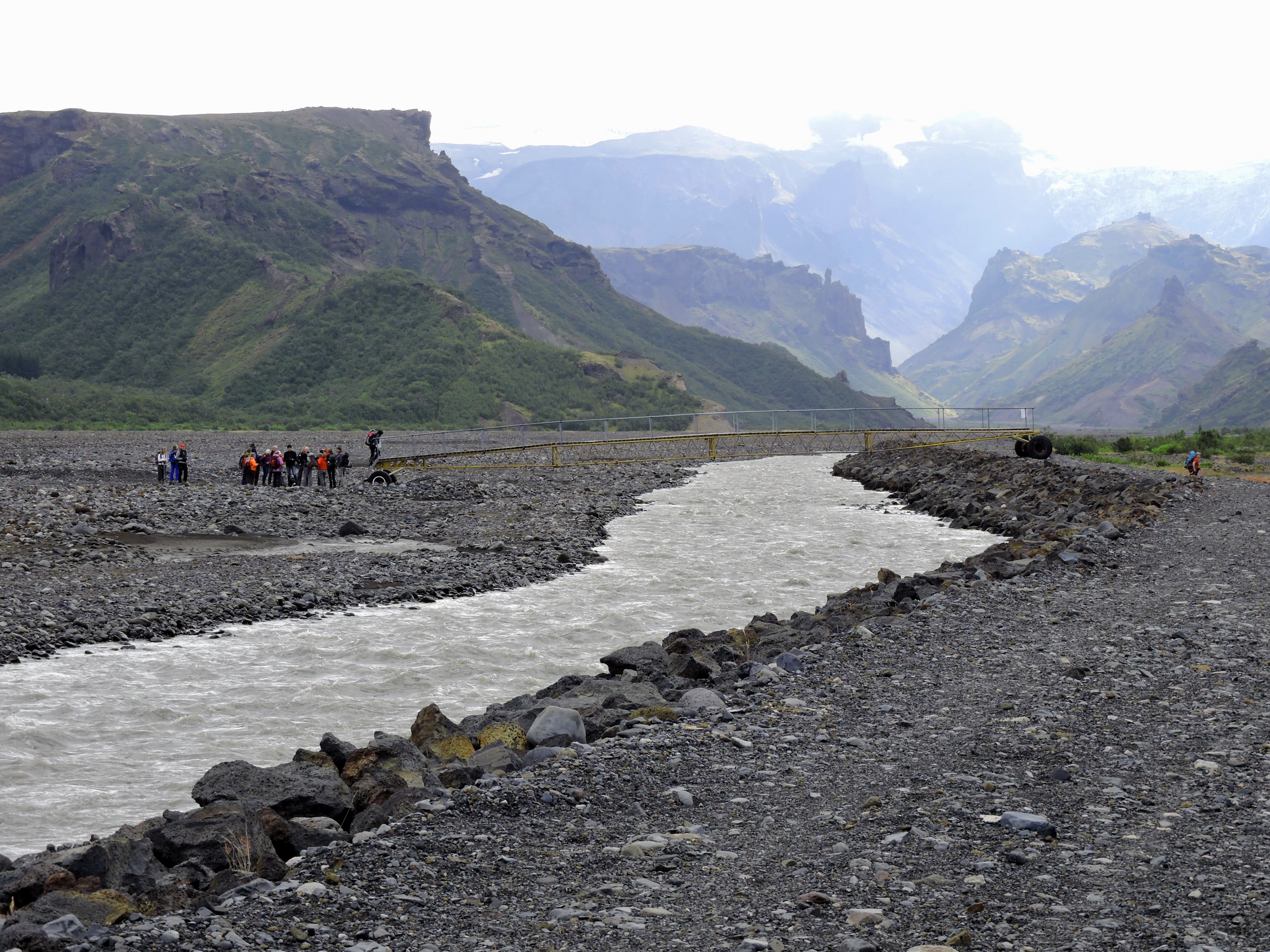
Near Básar, in Þórsmörk

Thórsmörk (Icelandic: Þórsmörk, [ˈθour̥sˌmœr̥k]) is a mountain ridge in Iceland that was named after the Norse god Thor (Þór). It is situated in the south of Iceland between the glaciers Tindfjallajökull and Eyjafjallajökull. The name "Thórsmörk" properly refers only to the mountain ridge between the rivers Krossá, Þröngá, and Markarfljót, but is sometimes used informally to describe a wider area that includes the region between Thórsmörk and Eyjafjallajökull. Thórsmörk is one of the most popular hiking areas in Iceland.

In the valley, the river Krossá winds between the mountains. The valley is closed in between glaciers, Mýrdalsjökull being at the rear end of the valley. This leads to an especially warm climate, better than in the rest of south Iceland. In the protected valley, green vegetation of moss, fern, birchwood, and other small shrubs are found.

Thórsmörk is popular amongst hikers. Many different tours are possible, from hiking on the glaciers to trekking (i.e., Laugavegur up to Landmannalaugar) or smaller excursions, such as to the canyon Stakkholtsgjá with its waterfall or five small day treks, to the summits of surrounding peaks, with rewarding views, even in bad weather. The Krossá is a cold, fast river coming down from glaciers; a bridge allows pedestrians to cross. Coaches arrive daily from Reykjavík and other towns in Iceland.

== Volcanic ash from Eyjafjallajökull ==
During the spring 2010 eruptions of Eyjafjallajökull, much of the area was covered in a thick layer of volcanic ash. Several months were needed for nature to return to normal.

== See also ==
- Geography of Iceland
