= Markarfljót =

River in Iceland

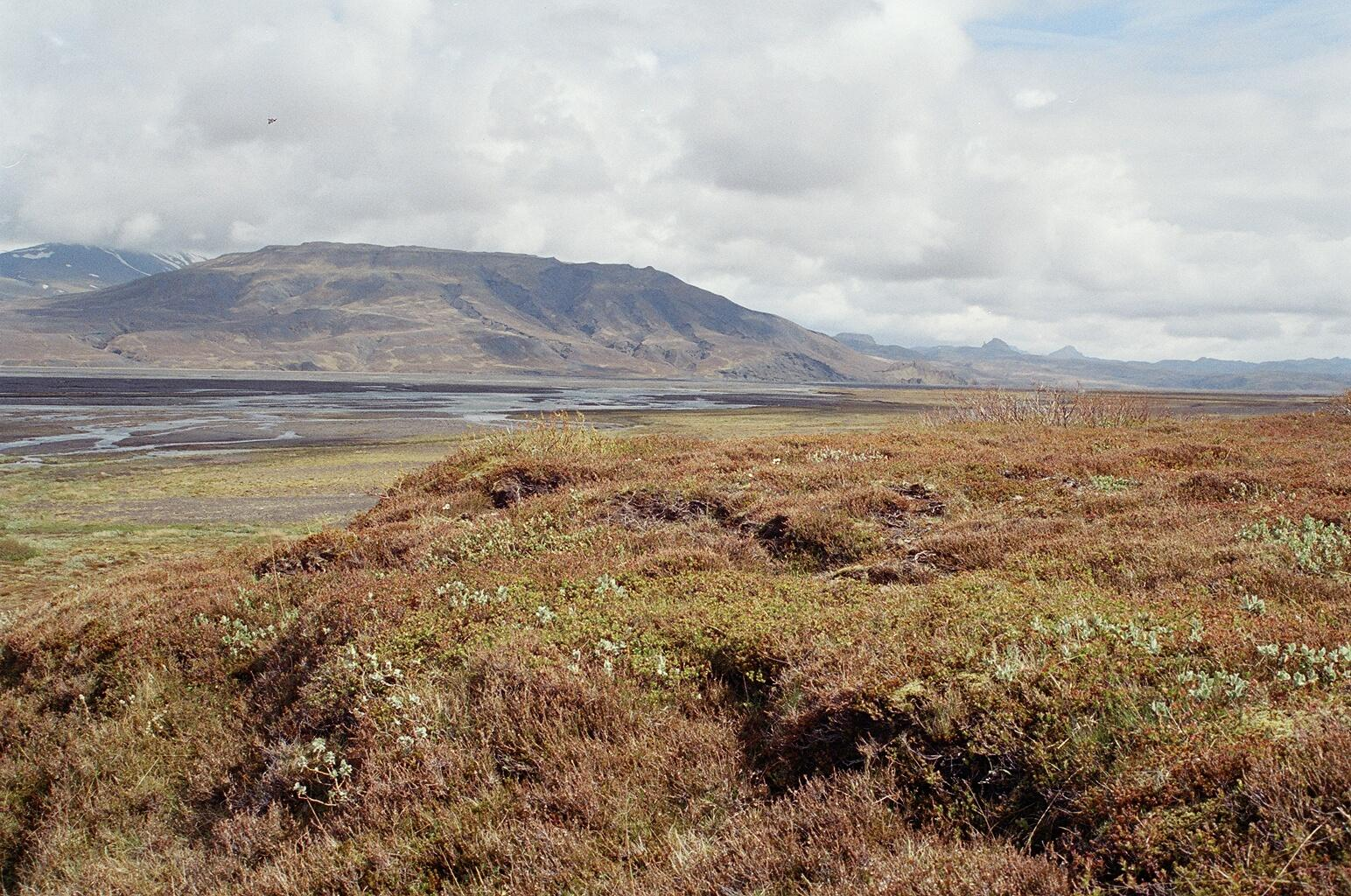
- Markarfljót near Þórsmörk with Þórólfsfell in the background

- Location within Iceland

Physical characteristics
- Source: Mýrdalsjökull
  - coordinates: 63°40′N 19°06′W
- 2nd source: Eyjafjallajökull
  - coordinates: 63°37′12″N 19°36′48″W
- 3rd source: Tindfjallajökull
  - coordinates: 63.8°N 19.58°W
- 4th source: Torfajökull
  - coordinates: 63°55′N 19°10′W
- Mouth
  - location: near Landeyjahöfn
- Basin size: 830 km^{2} (320 sq mi)
- Discharge
  - maximum: 2,640 m^{3}/s (93,000 cu ft/s)

Basin features
- Population: 1000 plus
- Tributaries
  - left: Hvítmaga, Innri-Botná, Fossá, Þórólfsá, Marðará
  - right: Innri-Emstruá, Ljósá, Þröngá, Krossá (Markarfljót), Jökulsá, Merkurá, Seljalandsfoss

Markarfljót (Icelandic pronunciation: [ˈmar̥karˌfljouːt]) is a river in the south of Iceland. It is approximately 100 km (62 mi) long and has had in pre-history jökulhlaups which would be potentially catastrophic, if a similar sized one was to happen in the future.

== Geography ==
The Markarfljót rises in the Rauðafossafjöll [ˈrœyːðaˌfɔsːaˌfjœtl̥] massif, east of the volcano Hekla and drains the Grænafjall, Framfjall (to the east) and Emstrur, Almenningar (to the west) basins. The main sources for the river are the glaciers Mýrdalsjökull (including Sléttjökull, Entujökull, Hrútárökull outlet glaciers and the Goðalandsjökull ice margin) and Eyjafjallajökull (including Steinsholtsjökull, Gígjökull and Eyjafjallajökull outlet glaciers). It flows through narrow gorges in the mountainous area between the glaciers Tindfjallajökull and Torfajökull (and Kaldaklofsjökull), which are also sources, then spreads in the wide Markarfljótsaurar sandur plains at Iceland's south coast, near Þórsmörk. The Markarfljót takes its course first north, then west of Þórsmörk and finally empties into the Atlantic west of Eyjafjallajökull.

One of the Markarfljót's tributaries is the river Krossá [ˈkʰrɔsːˌauː], flowing through Þórsmörk, which is notorious for sudden changes in its water level. This river is sourced from the Krossárjökull outlet glacier of Mýrdalsjökull.

=== Discharges ===
The highest discharges ever measured in the Markarfljót were 2,100 m^{3}/s (74,000 cu ft/s) in 1967, during the Steinholt jökulhlaup and then 2,640 m^{3}/s (93,000 cu ft/s) during the 2010 eruptions of Eyjafjallajökull.

=== Risk ===
There is evidence of at least 10 jokulhlaups down the Markarfljot in the past 7000 years. Prehistoric jökulhlaup discharges have been much higher than recently and completely covered the Markarfljótsaurar outwash plain which means the total river basin of about 830 km^{2} (320 sq mi) with a population of over 1000 is at risk from a jökulhlaup of over 180,000 km^{3}/s (2,600,000 cu mi/min) in size. The tsunami wave hitting the Vestmannaeyjar Islands from such an event has been estimated to be 2–3 m (6 ft 7 in – 9 ft 10 in) in height and not to cause significant damage off the coast.

=== Infrastructure ===
The first bridge over the river was opened in 1934 near Litli Dímon [ˈlɪhtla ˈtiːˌmɔːn]. It is 242 meters long and was at the time the longest bridge in Iceland. A second bridge was built in 1978 at Emstrur [ˈɛmstrʏr̥]. A third bridge was opened in 1992 a few kilometers south of the first bridge.

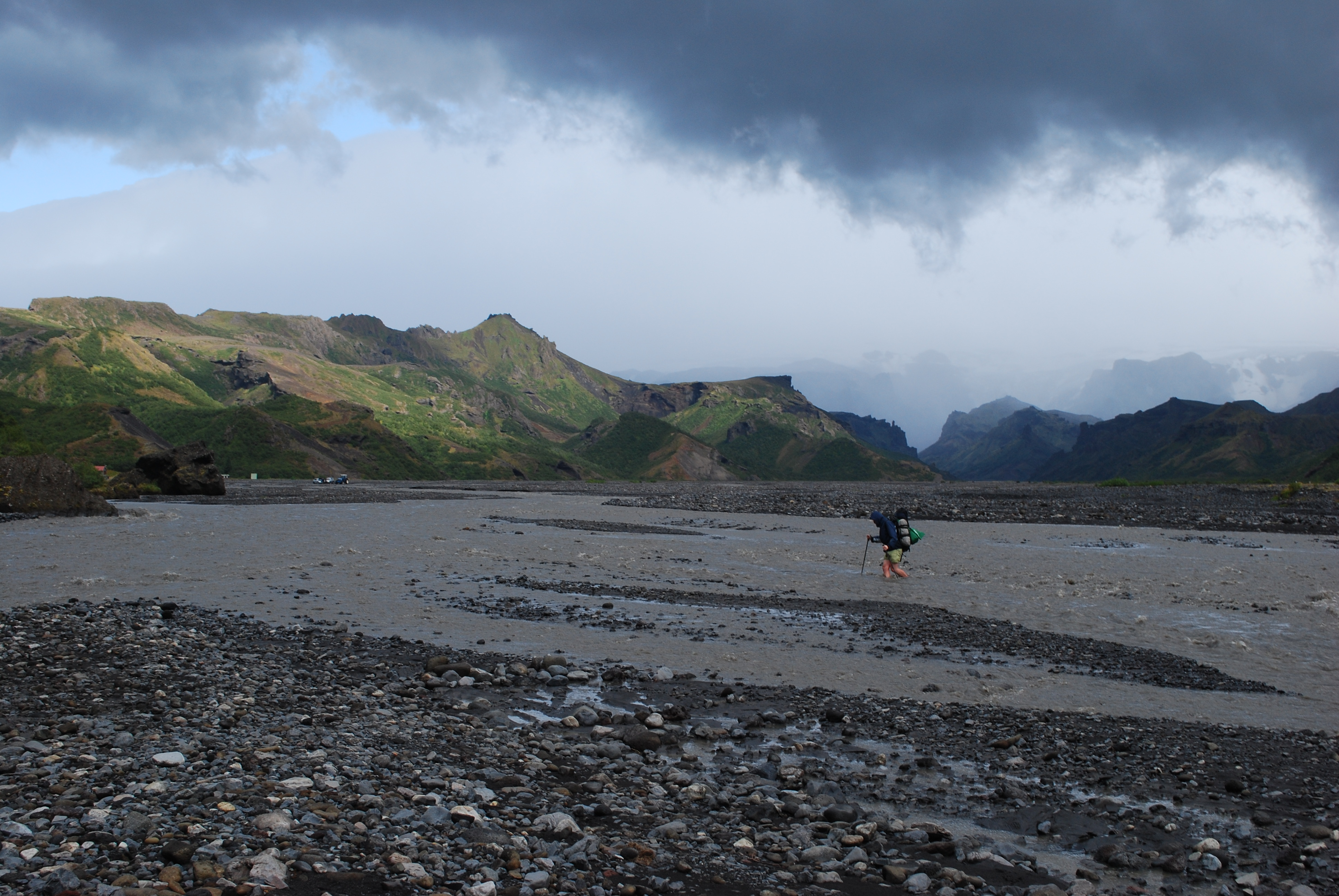
Wading the Krossá River.

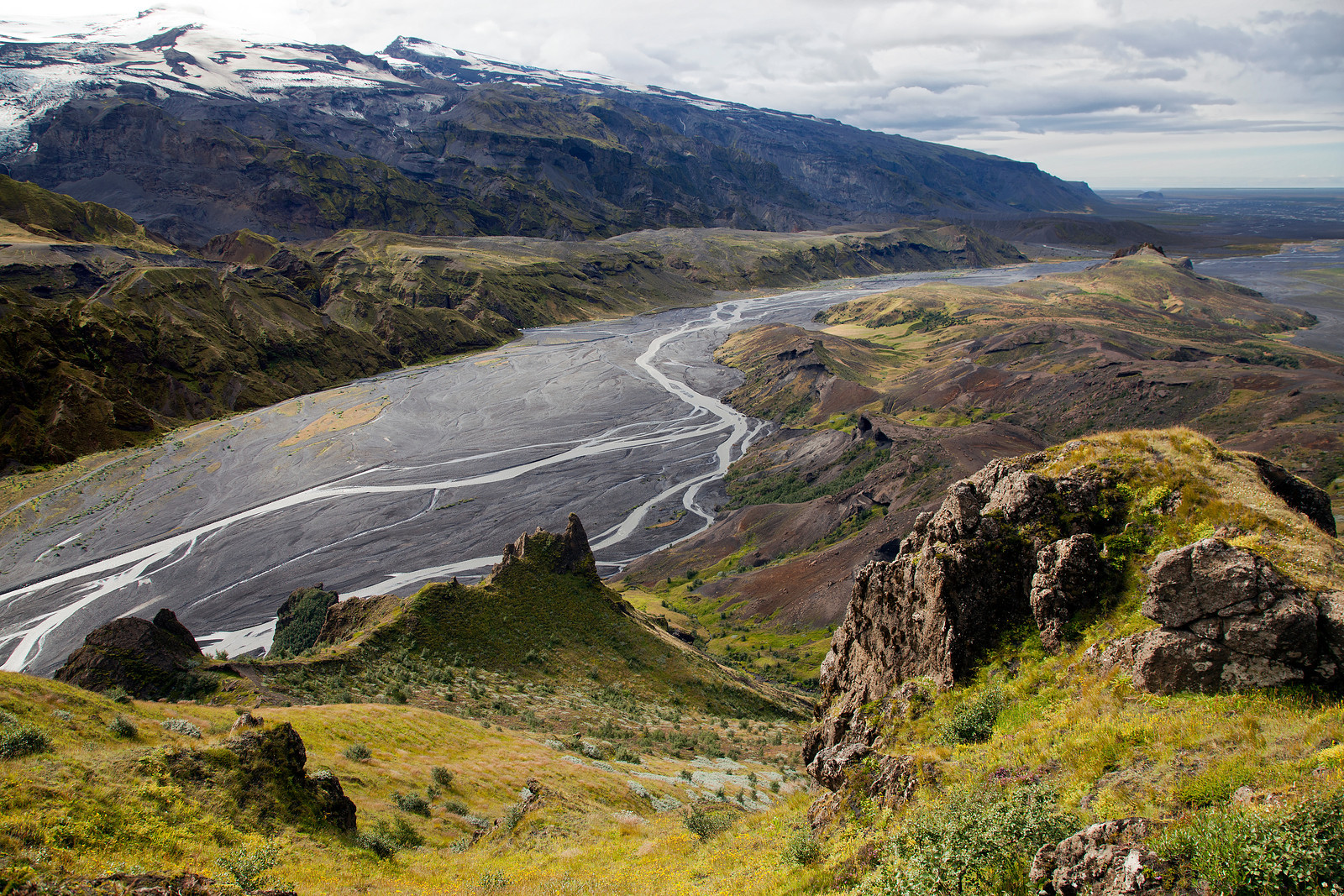
Markarfljót gorge.

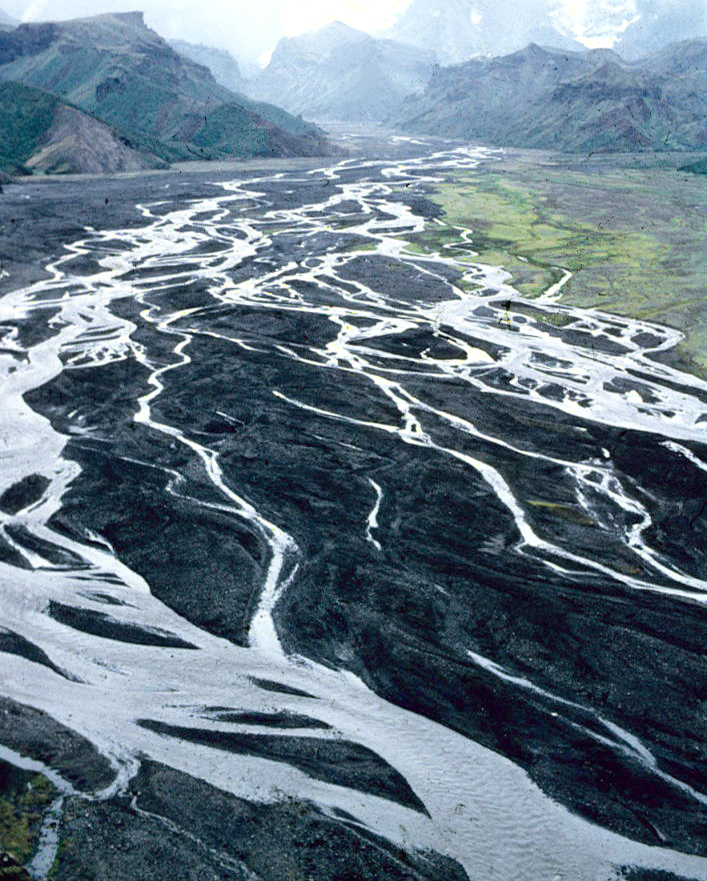
Markarfljótsaurar upper flood plain.

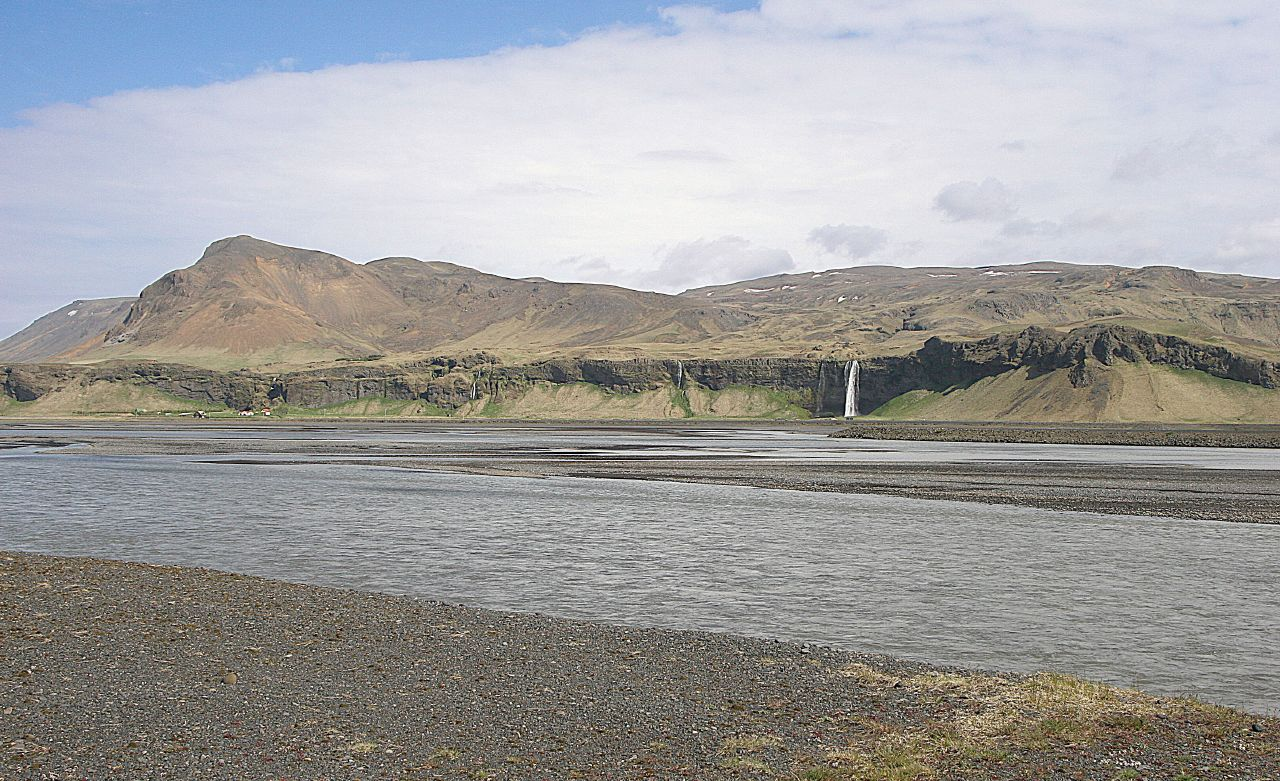
Markarfljót view from west bank towards Eyjafjallajökull.

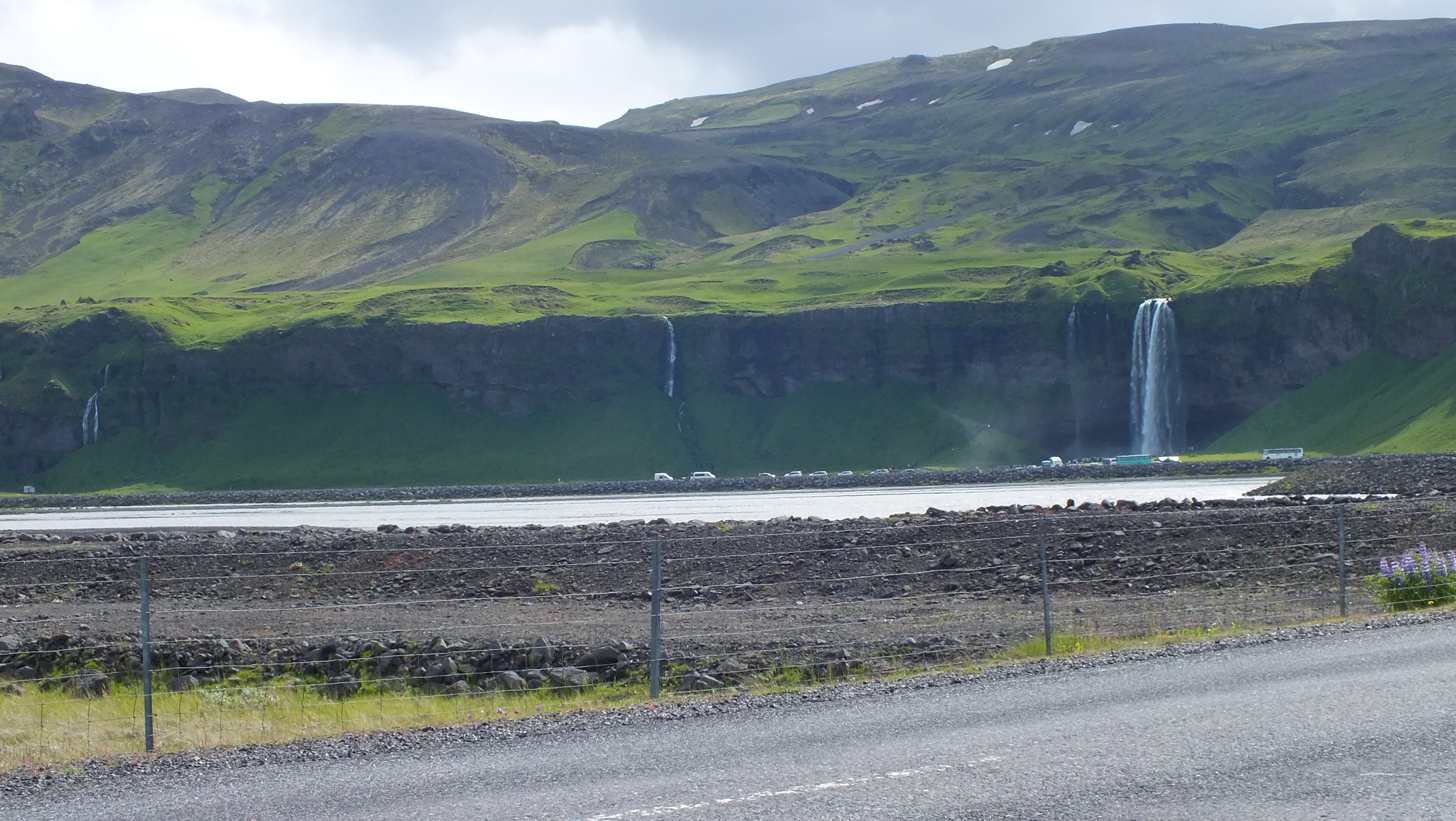
Seljalandsfoss water fall from west bank of Markarfljót

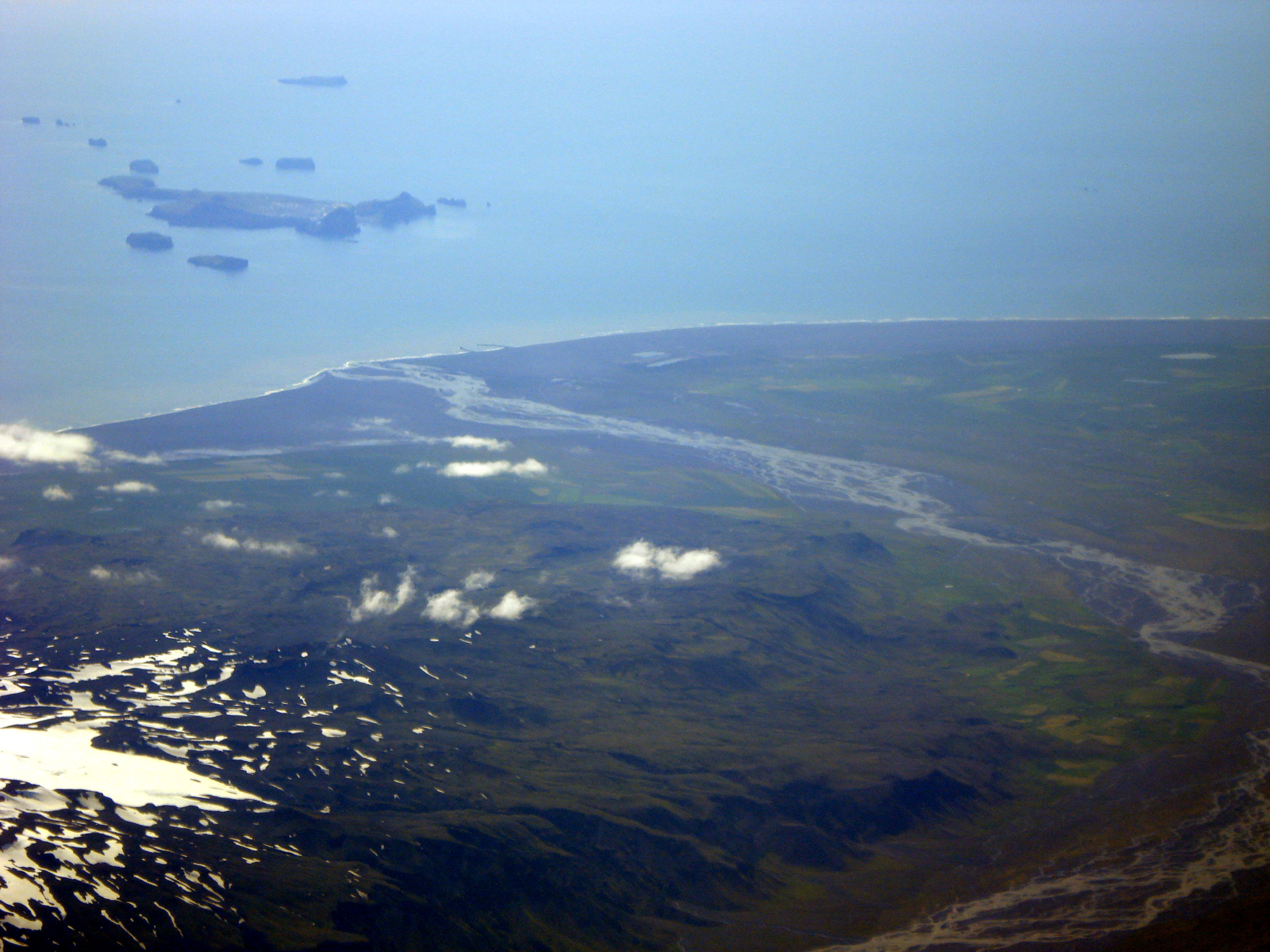
River mouth with Markarfljótsaurar flood plain and Vestmannaeyjar islands beyond. The snow cover is on the Eyjafjallajökull volcano.

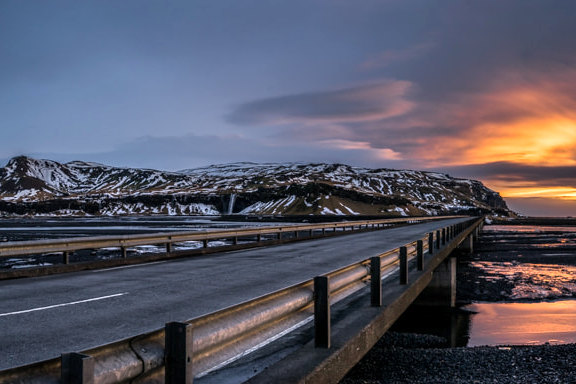
Lower Markarfljot bridge.
