= Laugavegur =

Hiking trail in South Iceland

Coordinates: 63.983°N 19.067°W

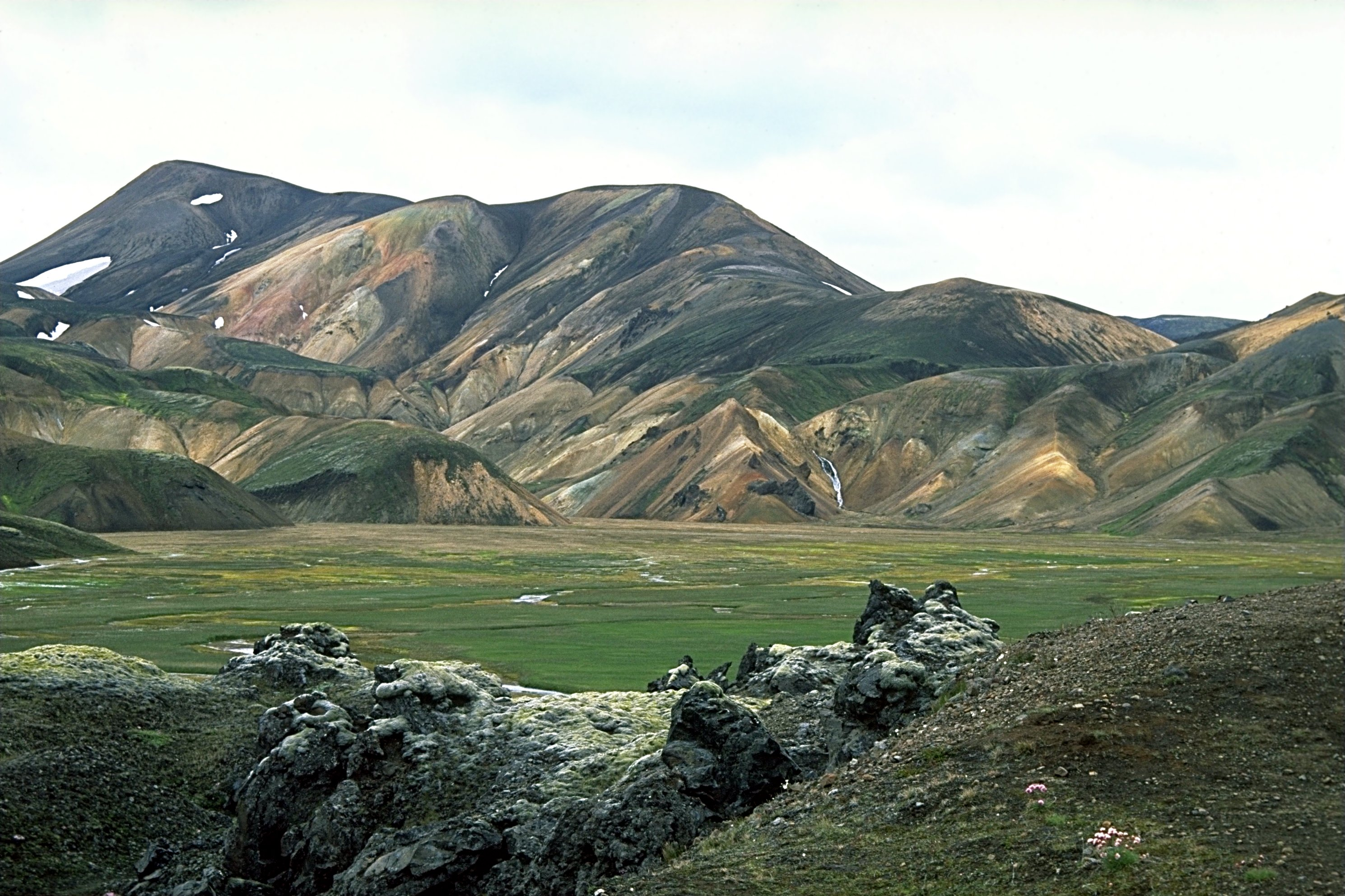
- Landmannalaugar on the Laugavegur
- Length: 54 km (34 mi)
- Location: Southwest Iceland
- Established: 30 September 1978; 48 years ago
- Trailheads: Landmannalaugar; Þórsmörk
- Use: Hiking
- Elevation gain/loss: 500 metres (1,600 ft)
- Highest point: Hrafntinnusker, 1,050 m (3,440 ft)
- Months: June to September
- Maintainer: Ferðafélag Íslands
- Website: www.fi.is/en/hiking-trails/trails/laugavegur
Trail map

Laugavegur (Icelandic pronunciation: [ˈlœyːɣaˌvɛːɣʏr̥]) is a hiking trail in South Iceland. It is the most popular trail in Iceland, with an estimated 75,000-100,000 people hiking it every year. In 2012, National Geographic listed it as one of the twenty best trails in the world.

Laugavegur runs from the hot springs area of Landmannalaugar to the glacial valley of Þórsmörk. It is noted for the wide variety of landscapes on its path: colourful mountains, black lava, bubbling hot springs, lakes, canyons and a black sandy desert.

The route is typically completed by hikers in four days, north to south, with stops at the mountain huts of Hrafntinnusker, Álftavatn, and Emstrur. At least three rivers must be forded during the walk. It is possible to combine the trek with a hike over the Fimmvörðuháls route from Þórsmörk to Skógar.

The trail is clearly signposted throughout its length. However, adverse weather conditions such as thick fog or heavy snow can dramatically reduce the visibility. This is particularly relevant for the first two sections of the trail.

The trail is open from the end of June 25 to mid September, when the huts close.

The Laugavegur Ultramarathon has been held annually on the trail since 1997.
