= Fimmvörðuháls =

Ridge between glaciers in Iceland

Coordinates: 63°37′53″N 19°26′50″W

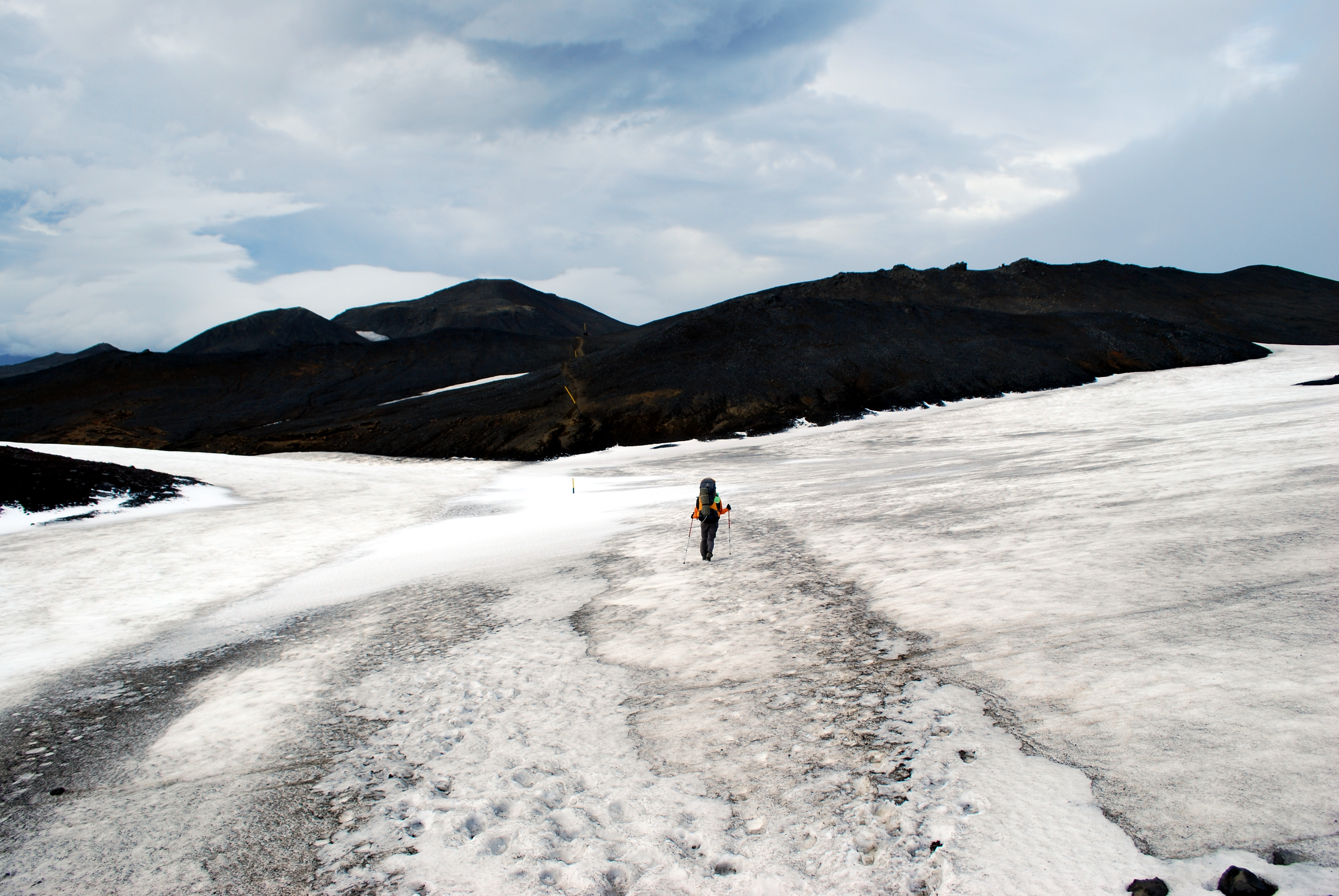
Area in Fimmvörðuháls

Fimmvörðuháls (Icelandic pronunciation: [ˈfɪmːˌvœrðʏˌhauls]; "five cairns pass") is the area between the glaciers Eyjafjallajökull and Mýrdalsjökull in southern Iceland. The route between Skógar and Thórsmörk goes through this pass and is one of the most popular walking routes in Iceland, despite being 22 kilometres (14 mi) long and involving 1,000 metres (3,300 ft) of climbing. There are two mountain huts along Fimmvörðuháls, one owned by hiking association Útivist, the other called Baldvinsskáli ([ˈpaltˌvɪnsˌskauːlɪ]). The route from Skógar has many waterfalls along the way. The route is only accessible between mid-June and late-August. On the night of 16 May 1970, three travellers died in the mountain pass in a snowstorm.

Hiking the Fimmvörðuháls mountain pass takes 1–2 days. It is also possible to combine the Fimmvörðuháls route with the Laugavegur Trek between Landmannalaugar and Thórsmörk to make a trip of 4–6 days in length.

== 2010 eruption ==
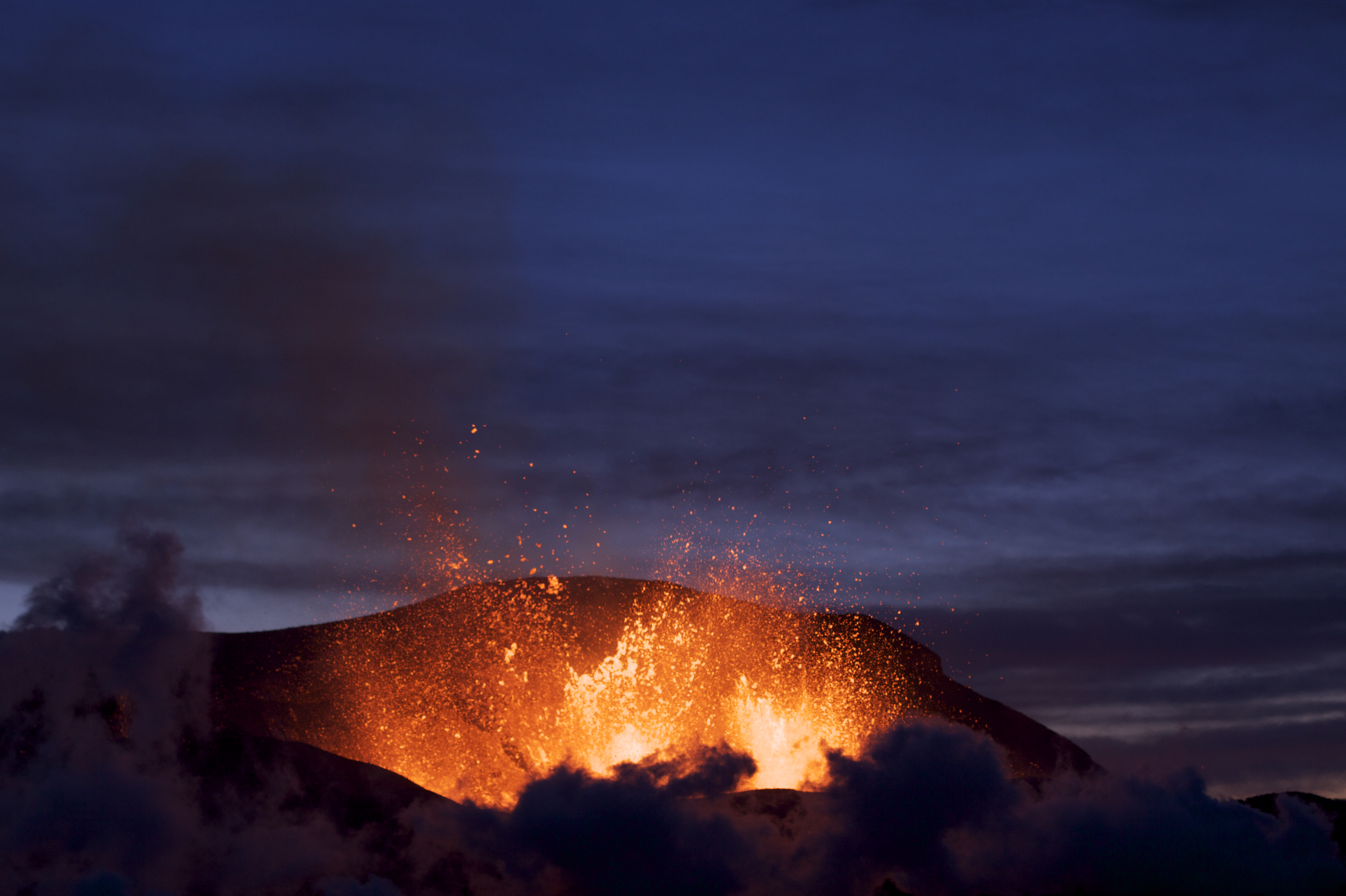
Eruption at Fimmvörðuháls at dusk.

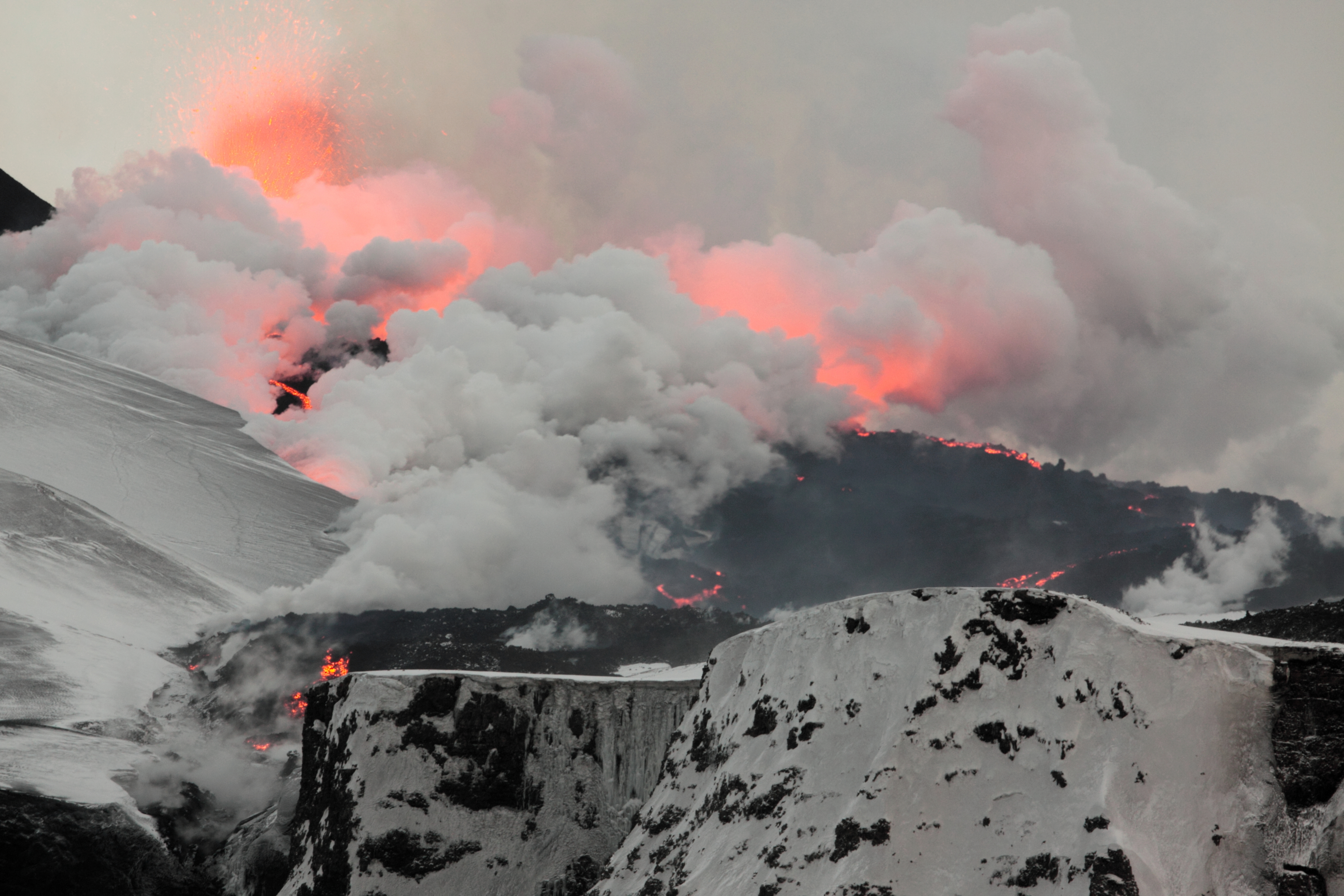
A fissure on Fimmvörðuháls, April 2, 2010. The lava flows down, turning snow into steam

On 20 March 2010, an eruption of the Eyjafjallajökull volcano began in Fimmvörðuháls following months of small earthquakes under the Eyjafjallajökull glacier. The eruption began around 23:00 and opened a 0.5 km (0.31 mi) long fissure vent on the northern part of the pass. Just over a week later, the Fimmvörðuháls eruption produced a 300-meter (980 ft)-long fissure and new craters were seen erupting on a northward path toward the area of Thórsmörk, a popular tourist nature preserve, prompting tours to stop briefly as volcanologists assessed the situation further. The two new craters at Fimmvörduháls were named Magni and Móði, after the sons of Thor, the Norse god of thunder. It is an apt name because Thórsmörk is close to the craters. The new lava field was named Goðahraun, because the lava streamed in the area Goðaland. These official names were accepted by the Minister of Education and Culture 15 June 2010.

In April 2010, this was followed by a larger eruption on Eyjafjallajökull itself.
