= Tindfjallajökull =

Glacier in Iceland

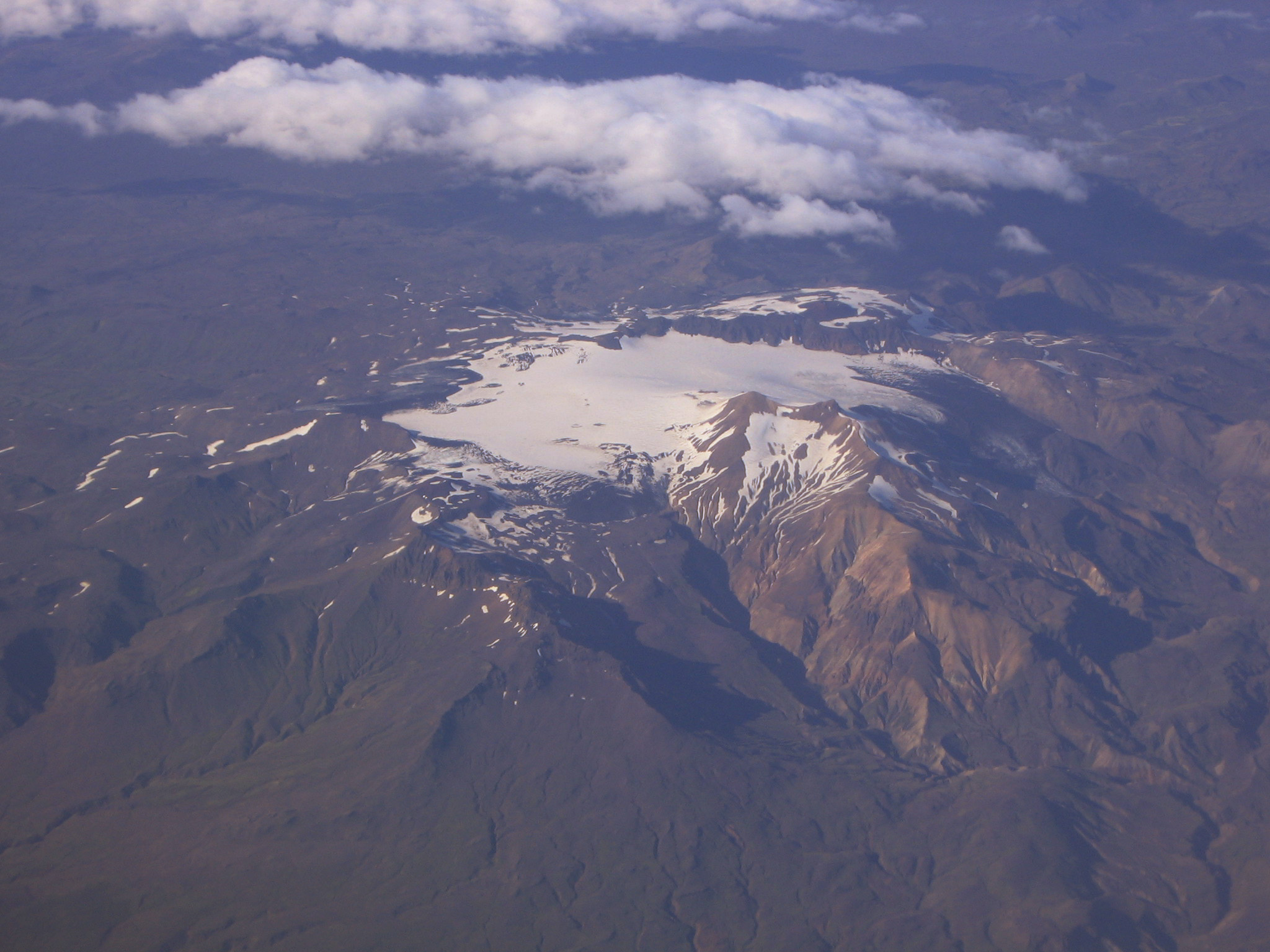
- Tindfjallajökull

Highest point
- Elevation: 1,462 m (4,797 ft)
- Prominence: 1,200 m (3,900 ft)
- Coordinates: 63.8°N 19.58°W

Dimensions
- Area: 300 km^{2} (120 sq mi)

Geography
- Geological features near the Tindfjallajökull volcanic system (red outline). Legend: Other shading shows: calderas; central volcanoes; fissure swarms; subglacial terrain above 1,100 m (3,600 ft); seismically active areas; Clicking on the rectangle in the image enlarges to full window and enables mouse-over with more detail.
- Location: Iceland
- Parent range: Mid-Atlantic Ridge

Geology
- Mountain type: Stratovolcano
- Last eruption: Possibly Holocene

Tindfjallajökull (Icelandic pronunciation: [ˈtʰɪntˌfjatlaˌjœːkʏtl̥], alternatively Tindafjallajökull) is a glacier in the south of Iceland whose name is also given to the underlying stratovolcano. Tindfjöll ([ˈtʰɪntˌfjœtl̥], "peak mountains") is a ridge that extends to the south of the glacier and is an alternative name for the volcano. The name of the glacier in Icelandic means "Tindfjöll glacier".

== Geography ==
Its highest peak is Ýmir [ˈiːmɪr̥] at 1,462 m (4,797 ft), which takes its name from the giant Ýmir of Norse mythology. The peak Ýma is about 500 m (1,600 ft) to its east. The Thórólfsfell (Þórólfsfel) tuya at 595 m (1,952 ft) is on the southern flanks of Tindfjallajökull, about 8 km (5.0 mi) south of the glacier. Its eastern slopes abut the Þórsmörk ignimbrite. The western flank has a prominence near Austurdalur and the eastern flank that of Vestriöxl at 1,002 m (3,287 ft). About 2 km (1.2 mi) to the north of Ýma is the peak of Sindri at 1,272 m (4,173 ft). Ásgrindur at 1,299 m (4,262 ft) is a similar distance north of Ýmir.

== Volcano ==
The central volcano is 15 to 20 km (9.3 to 12.4 mi) in diameter with a 5 by 7 km (3.1 by 4.3 mi) wide caldera and has erupted rocks of basaltic to rhyolitic composition. The most recent eruption is suspected to have been in the Holocene, and the prior mountain building eruptions must have been before 55,000 years ago. There are eight tuyas in the volcanic system. The largest, the asymmetric Thórólfsfell tuya with its area of about 8 km^{2} (3.1 sq mi) and prominence of about 450 m (1,480 ft) is the type tuya for tuya's where there is no evidence for the presence of a large and long-lived meltwater lake under the ice cover, as meltwater was able to drain away between its formative eruptions. In the 1980's it was postulated that the Þórsmörk ignimbrite originated from the volcano but it originated from Torfajökull to the north. Sultarfell is a pale coloured rhyolitic hill in the fissure swarm north-east of Tindfjallajökull. There is a hot spring in Hitagil to the south-east so some geothermal activity remains.

== Glacier ==
Tindfjallajökull
- Map of Tindfjallajökull glacier (light grey shading, white outline), with western river drainage labelled.
- Type: Glacier
- Location: Iceland
- Coordinates: 63°48′N 19°35′W
- Area: 12.4 km^{2} (4.8 sq mi).
- Status: Retreating

It is capped by a glacier that has been mapped to a maximum in the 1890's of about 22.6 km^{2} (8.7 sq mi) in area, but which by 2019 had had a 45% decrease in area. In 1945 to 1946 it was mapped to an area of 16.8 km^{2} (6.5 sq mi), in 2000 15 km^{2} (5.8 sq mi) and 2019 12.4 km^{2} (4.8 sq mi). The only current outlet glacier with a moraine is unnamed down the Eystri Botná valley but between 1994 and 2006 had surge glacier characteristics before regressing again. Part of the glacier to the north has now separated into three with one glacier being called Blesárjökull. A small glacier on the eastern slopes of Ýma called Ýmujökull has disappeared.

The rivers that flow from the glacier are Hvítmaga [ˈkʰvitˌmaːɣa] to the north-east, Gilsá [ˈcɪlsˌauː] to the south, Þórólfsá [ˈθouːroul(f)sˌauː] to the south-west, Valá [ˈvaːlˌauː] to the north-west and Blesá [ˈplɛːsˌauː] to the north. Hvítmaga, Gilsá and Þórólfsá drain into Markarfljót while Valá and Blesá drain into Eystri Rangá [ˈeistrɪ ˈrauŋkˌauː].

== See also ==
- Glaciers of Iceland
- Volcanism of Iceland
  - List of volcanic eruptions in Iceland
  - List of volcanoes in Iceland
