= Þórólfsfell =

Mountain in Iceland

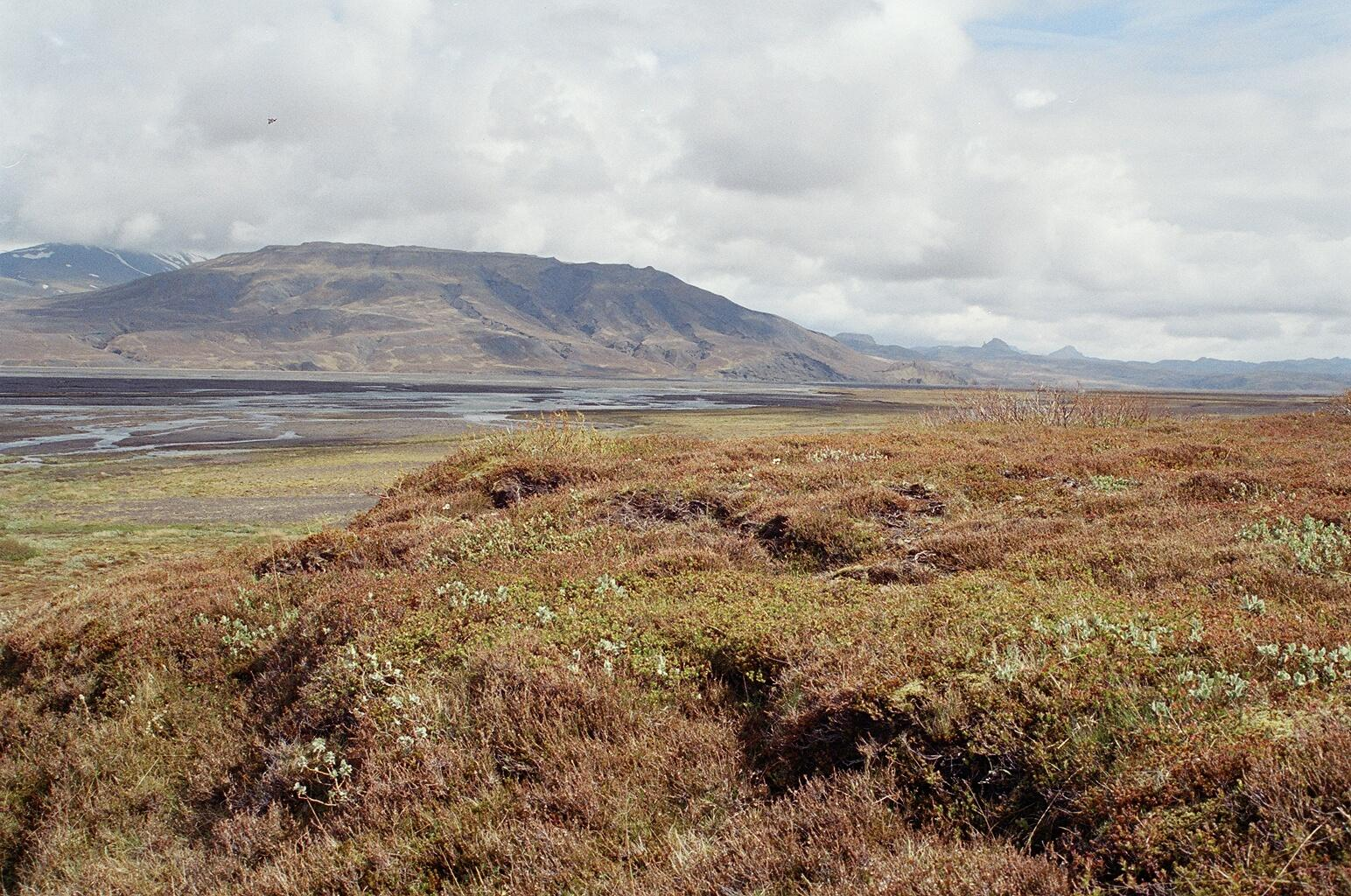
- Þórólfsfell seen from the south across Markarfljót

Highest point
- Elevation: 574 m (1,883 ft)
- Coordinates: 63°43′03″N 19°39′55″W

Geography
- Location within Iceland
- Location: Southern Region, Iceland

Geology
- Mountain type: Tuya

Þórólfsfell (Icelandic pronunciation: [ˈθouːroul(f)sˌfɛtl̥]) is a basaltic tuya in southern Iceland, east of Fljótshlíð. The upper section is made up of pillow lavas and is 574 metres above sea level.

== See also ==
- Volcanism of Iceland
  - List of volcanic eruptions in Iceland
  - List of volcanoes in Iceland
