= Eldgjá =

Volcanic fissure and eruption in south Iceland

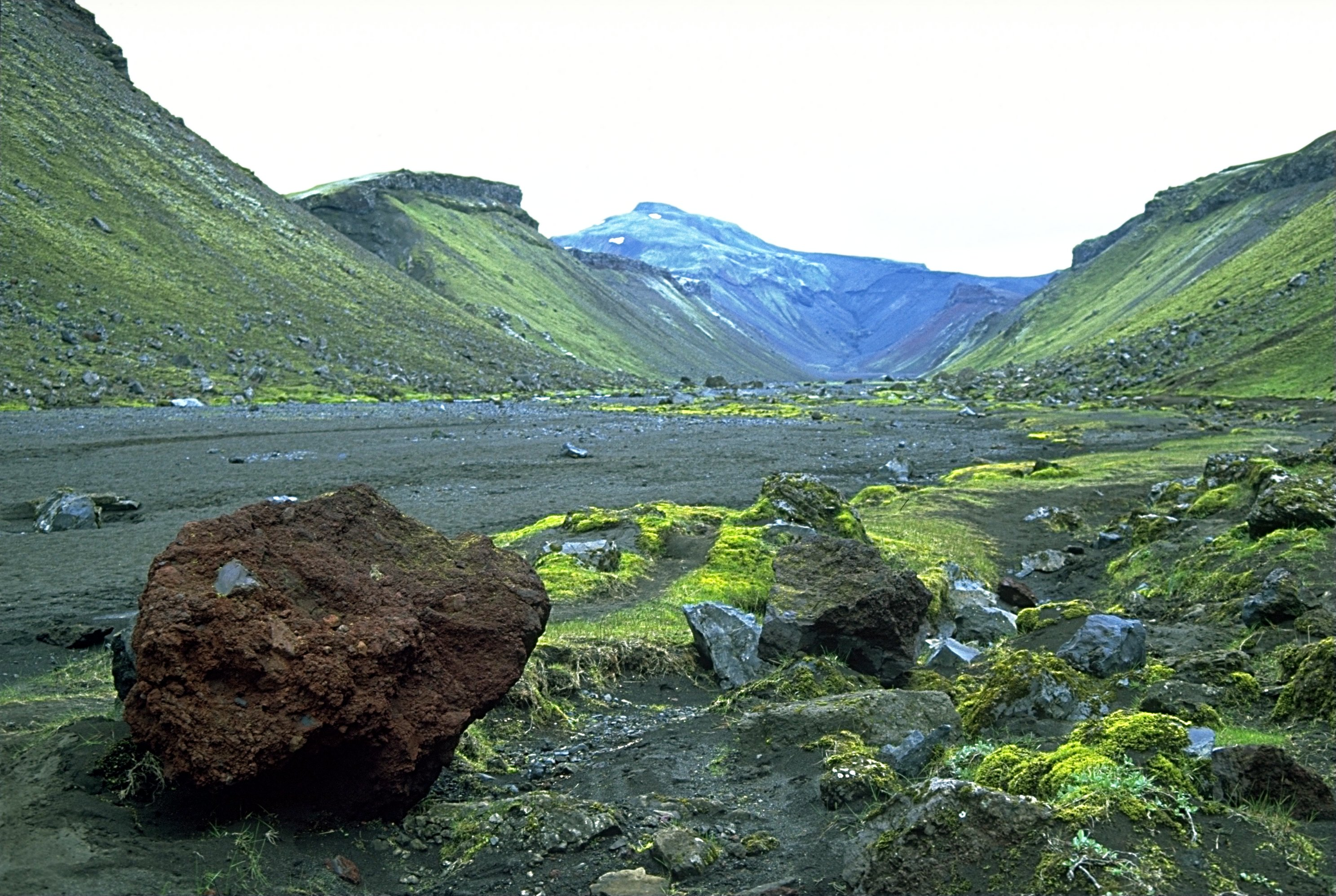
- Canyon floor of Eldgjá

Highest point
- Elevation: varies: canyon to 800 metres (2,625 ft)
- Listing: List of volcanoes in Iceland
- Coordinates: 63°58′00″N 18°36′33″W

Geography
- Location within Iceland
- Selected geological features near the Eldgjá fissure swarm which is to the north-east of the Katla central volcano (red outlines). Violet shading shows the extent of the lava fields erupted with the darker violet being surface lava and lighter violet being the less accurately mapped, now buried lava. Some unmapped lava may exist under Mýrdalsjökull. Shading also shows: calderas, central volcanoes and fissure swarms, subglacial terrain above 1,100 m (3,600 ft), seismically active areas. Clicking on the image enlarges to full window and enables mouse-over with more detail. Location in Iceland
- Location: Iceland

Geology
- Mountain type: Fissure vents of Katla
- Last eruption: 939

Eldgjá (Icelandic pronunciation: [ˈɛltˌcauː], "fire canyon") is a volcano and a canyon in Iceland. Eldgjá is part of the Katla volcano; it is a segment of a 40 kilometres (25 mi) long chain of volcanic craters and fissure vents that extends northeast away from Katla volcano almost to the Vatnajökull ice cap. This fissure experienced a major eruption around 939 CE, which was the largest effusive eruption in recent history. It covered about 780 square kilometres (300 sq mi) of land with 18.6 cubic kilometres (4.5 cu mi) of lava from two major lava flows.

While Icelandic records about the effects of the eruption are sparse, paleoclimate proxies and historical records from China, Europe and the Islamic world describe widespread impacts on the Northern Hemisphere's climate. The Eldgjá eruption produced a noticeable cooling of the climate, with resulting cold winters and food crises across Eurasia.

== Geology ==
The interaction between the Mid-Atlantic Ridge and the Iceland hotspot has given rise to the stack of volcanic rocks that forms Iceland. Volcanoes on Iceland occur in four volcanic zones; the North Volcanic Zone in northeastern Iceland, the East Volcanic Zone in the southeast, the West Volcanic Zone in the southwest and the Snæfellsnes Volcanic Zone in the west. The first three of these form an upside-down Y structure, with each volcanic zone consisting of volcanic and tectonic lineaments that extend from north-northeast to south-southwest. These lineaments are dotted with volcanic edifices; Eldgjá lies in the East Volcanic Zone where there are no large shield volcanoes but numerous long fissures, including Laki.

Glaciation has influenced volcanic activity on Iceland, and the occurrence of large eruptions—such as the 25 km^{3} (6.0 cu mi) Þjórsá Lava 8,600 years ago—in the early Holocene has been attributed to the unloading of the crust caused by the melting of Pleistocene ice. This process does not appear to have influenced the Eldgjá eruption. Eldgjá's eruption may have altered the shape of the Katla volcano and thus modified the behaviour of its glaciers. Glacial meltwater drains from Katla through several subglacial "tunnels", one of which coincides with the Eldgjá lineament, and geothermal activity on the lineament drives melting and the formation of cauldron-shaped depressions in the northeastern sector of the Myrdalsjökull Ice Cap. Moraines from the ice cap extend to the Eldgjá lineament.

The rocks erupted by Eldgjá are mainly alkali basalts, which have a uniform composition and contain phenocrysts of clinopyroxene, olivine, magnetite and plagioclase. There are also a small amount of tholeiitic rocks. The composition of Katla magmas shows evidence of long-term variations that appear to reflect a long-term cycle of its magmatic system. The Eldgjá eruption appears to be the beginning of one such cycle that continues to the present-day. There is evidence that eruptions of Eyjafjallajökull often precede eruptions at Katla, raising concerns after the 2010 eruption of Eyjafjallajökull that Katla may erupt again.

== Geography and geomorphology ==
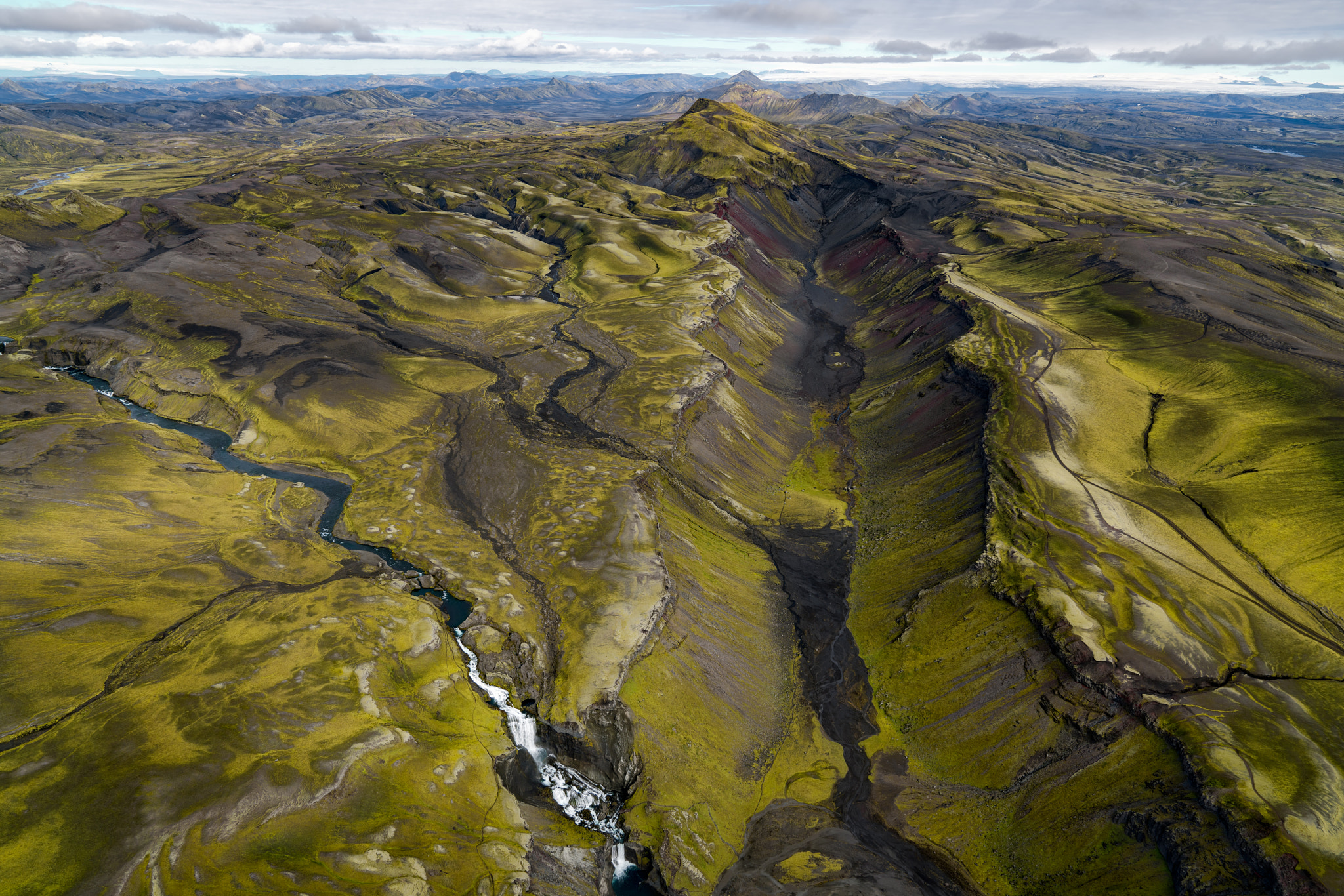
Eldgjá

Eldgjá means "fire gorge" and is a reference to the fissure that makes up the volcano; the term is also used with other Icelandic volcanoes. It is situated between Landmannalaugar and Kirkjubæjarklaustur. The Ófærufoss waterfall, a tourist attraction, lies in the main Eldgjá fissure. There used to be an oft-photographed natural bridge at Ófærufoss, which collapsed during the early 1990s. The northern part of Eldgjá, including Ófærufoss, and surrounding areas, have been a part of Vatnajökull National Park since 2011; the entire Eldgjá is since 2010 part of the Katla Geopark. There are information centres and picnic places at Eldgjá.

It consists of a northeast–southwest trending graben with explosion craters, about 8.5 kilometres (5.3 mi) long. It is 600 metres (2,000 ft) wide, 150 metres (490 ft) deep and part of a larger 40 kilometres (25 mi) long chain of offset grabens. The canyon is subdivided into four segments from southwest to northeast. The northeasternmost segment is known as Kambagígar [ˈkʰampaˌciːɣar̥]); the name Eldgjá is usually only applied to the 8.5 km (5.3 mi) long segment in the middle of the chain, but the 939 eruption also involved other segments. The canyon extends between the Öldufellsjökull glacier [ˈœltʏˌfɛlsˌjœːkʏtl̥] of the Myrdalsjökull Ice Cap (the ice cap covers part of the fissure) in the southwest, stretches across mountainous terrain and almost reaches the Vatnajökull Ice Cap to the northeast at Stakafell [ˈstaːkaˌfɛtl̥] mountain. It is the longest volcanic fissure in Iceland.

Ground fractures, hornitos, normal faults, lava lakes, pyroclastic cones and spatter ramparts make up the Eldgjá lineament; the cones form alignments and have red-to-gray colours and consist of alternating layers of lava, scoria and spatter, with the scoria and spatter sometimes fused together until they resemble lava flows. There is evidence that the Eldgjá fissure existed before the 930s eruption. Ongoing activity of the fissure can be seen in the form of ground deformation.

The Eldgjá is part of the wider Katla volcano, which features a series of fissures, as well as a caldera covered by the Myrdalsjökull Ice Cap. To the northeast, the lineament runs 5 kilometres (3.1 mi) away from and parallel to that of the 1783-1784 CE Laki eruption fissure, which is part of the Grimsvötn volcano. There are other volcanic centres in the area, some of which had large fissure-fed eruptions within historical memory.

== 10th century eruption ==
The Eldgjá eruption was the largest Holocene eruption of the Katla system, the largest effusive eruption on Earth during the last few millennia, and the only historical eruption of this volcano outside of its caldera. It involved a 75 km (47 mi) long area of the volcano, including both the central caldera and the Eldgjá lineament. During the course of the eruption, about 16 episodes of Plinian or subplinian eruptions took place, producing plumes with heights of 15 kilometres (9.3 mi). These episodes did not occur simultaneously across the entire length of the Eldgjá; rather the eruption commenced in the caldera and propagated northeastward. Intense lava fountaining, explosive eruptions and the effusion of lava took place.

The eruption has been linked to an episode of active continental rifting in the 930s, during which the injection of magma into dykes led to deformation of the ground surface and the evacuation of magmas from the Katla magmatic system. Part of this magma entered into the Katla magma chamber, triggering the release of silicic magmas that form part of the tephra and were at least for some time erupted simultaneously with basaltic magmas. Other volcanoes in Iceland such as Bárðarbunga, Grimsvötn and Reykjanes peninsula erupted at the same time as Eldgjá.

=== Dating ===
The Eldgjá eruption took place in the 930s, but its exact date had long been uncertain. Early research put its beginning during 934–938. Later research published in 2015 indicated that it began in 939 and likely ended in 940, but may have continued for several years more. Further confusion had been created because the Eldgjá eruption occurred only seven years before the Millennium Eruption of Paektu Mountain on the China–Korea border. Some climatic effects attributed to the Eldgjá eruption may actually have resulted from the Paektu eruption. That eruption, in 946 CE, may have produced only a small amount of sulfate aerosols, far less than Eldgjá. A tephra layer at Katla originally attributed to a 1000 CE eruption is now considered to be part of the Eldgjá eruption.

=== Products ===
The eruption produced two fields of (mostly pahoehoe) lava flows emanating from the southern and central sectors of the Eldgjá fracture. Flowing through lava tubes, the lava flows were channelled down river valleys and gorges and eventually reached the sea. They cover an area of 780 square kilometres (300 sq mi) and with a volume of 18.6 cubic kilometres (4.5 cu mi) constitute the largest lava flows of the last 1,100 years. The lavas buried traces of earlier eruptions and obstructed river valleys, forcing the rivers to change their course, and altered the terrain so that large parts of the plains east of Katla can no longer be reached by jökulhlaups (glacier meltwater flood) from the volcano. Rootless cones such as Álftaversgígar [ˈaul̥taˌvɛr̥sˌciːɣar̥] and Iceland's largest complex at Landbrotshólar [ˈlantˌprɔtsˌhouːlar̥] are linked to lava flows attributed to Eldgjá, although an older date for the latter lavas is possible. Later eruptions from Laki have buried many of the northeastern Eldgjá lava flows.

About 1.3 cubic kilometres (0.31 cu mi) dense rock equivalent of mostly basaltic ejecta became 4.5 cubic kilometres (1.1 cu mi) of tephra, which was emplaced mainly south and southeast from Eldgjá. The tephra was formed through alternating magmatic and phreatomagmatic processes, and is more complex than common Katla tephras. External water (such as from ice melt) did not play a major role in driving the explosivity of the eruption. Part of the eruption occurred underneath the Katla ice cap; this part also gave rise to the Kriki [ˈkʰrɪːcɪ] hyaloclastite on the eastern side of the ice cap, a product of an interaction between lava and ice. The Eldgjá eruption was accompanied by jökulhlaups from the northern, eastern and perhaps also southern part of Myrdalsjökull Ice Cap but the burial of its deposits by later glacier meltwater floods and lavas make it difficult to trace the precise extent of the flood. There is evidence that the inner structure of Katla was permanently altered by the Eldgjá eruption, as eruption rate decreased compared to the rate in the previous two millennia and there have been no meltwater floods on the southern or western side of the volcano since the event.

=== Tephra and aerosol emissions ===
Both tephra layers and sulfate layers linked to the Eldgjá eruption occur in Greenland, where they have been recorded from ice cores in the form of layers where the ice contains more acids, salts and tiny glass shards. Tephra layers from the eruption have been used to date lake sediments and ice cores in the Northern Hemisphere, volcanic eruptions at Eyjafjallajökull and other Icelandic volcanoes, glacier advances on the island, and events in Viking Age Iceland.

Large volcanic eruptions can produce veils of aerosols in the atmosphere from sulfur dioxide, which reduce the amount of sunlight reaching Earth's surface and alter its climate. Eldgjá produced about 232000000 ton of sulfur dioxide, more than that of other well-known historical eruptions (such as Tambora in 1815 and Huaynaputina in 1600) but possibly less than Laki in 1783, as phreatomagmatic activity would have scavenged sulfate from the eruption column. The Eldgjá eruption is the largest volcanic atmospheric pollution event of the last several millennia and traces of platinum erupted by the volcano have been found across the Western Hemisphere, where they have been used to date archaeological sites.

We looked at the sun, it did not have any strength, neither light nor heat. But we saw the sky and the colour [or 'appearance'] of it changed, as though viscous. And others said that they saw the sun as though half

— Annales Casinates, Italy

The climate impact of the Eldgjá has been recorded in cave deposits, historical reports, ice cores, tree rings and other environmental records potentially as far south as Australia. Tree rings suggest a cooling of about 0.7–1.5 °C (1.3–2.7 °F) in the Northern Hemisphere during 940 CE, most pronounced in Alaska, the Canadian Rocky Mountains, Central Asia, Central Europe and Scandinavia; in Canada and Central Asia it lasted until 941 CE. Volcanic aerosols often weaken the monsoons that feed the Nile River in Africa; during 939 the water levels of the river were unusually low. Conversely, increased flooding in Europe after the Eldgjá and other volcanic eruptions during the 10th century have been correlated to declines in Poland's Alnus trees. Some climate impacts attributed to Eldgjá might have been caused by simultaneous eruptions of other volcanoes, such as Ceboruco in Mexico.

The sun was the colour of blood from the beginning of day to midday on the following day

— Chronicon Scotorum, may be a sighting of the volcanic plume from the Eldgjá eruption

== Human impacts ==
Even though Iceland was already settled at that time and the impacts of the eruption were severe, there are no contemporary historical records of the eruption. Anecdotal reports are recorded in the Book of Settlements, which was written about 200 years later. Events in the poem Völuspá may record the eruption or another eruption of Katla. According to the Book of Settlements, lava flows forced settlers east of Katla off their land; two settlements or farms belonging to at least two settlements in the Álftaver [ˈaul̥taˌvɛːr̥] area southeast of Katla had to be abandoned due to damage from lava flows and sources of the 12th century define it a "wasteland". Tephra covered an area of about 20,000 square kilometres (7,700 sq mi) on Iceland; of these, 600 square kilometres (230 sq mi) were covered with over 1 metre (3 ft 3 in) of tephra and had to be abandoned, while 2,600 square kilometres (1,000 sq mi) received a tephra cover exceeding 20 centimetres (7.9 in) and suffered heavy damage as a result. The events and impact of the eruption may have stopped the settlement of the island and could have played a role in stimulating the Christianization of Iceland. However, it is possible that Iceland's population at the time was more resilient than during the 18th century and thus the Eldgjá event had less impact than the Laki eruption.

The settler Molda-Gnúpur took possession of land in Álftaver district between the rivers Kúðafjót and Eyjará. At that time a large lake was there and good swan hunting. He sold part of his settlement to many newcomers. The area became populated before it was overrun by jarðeldur (an earth fire), then they fled west to Höfðabrekka and set up a camp at Tjaldavellir

— Landnámabók pp. 328–331; Translation in Pálsson and Edwards 1972, Chap. 86

Unlike the local impacts on Iceland, the effects of the Eldgjá eruption on Europe appear in the historical record. Darkened skies were reported from Germany, Ireland, Italy, Portugal and Spain although the interpretation of contemporary reports as referencing atmospheric phenomena linked to the Eldgjá eruption is controversial. Reportedly, winters in Europe and China between 939 and 942 were severe, with the sea and canals freezing, while droughts occurred during the summer months. Food crises reported in China, the Maghreb, the Levant and Western Europe at that time have been linked to the Eldgjá eruption. More tentatively, the downfall of the Later Jin dynasty and locust plagues in China, epidemics of animal diseases in Europe and a decrease of human activity on Ireland and rebellions in Japan have been connected to the Eldgjá eruption.

=== Impacts of a repeat ===
Large fissure-fed effusive eruptions in Iceland reoccur every few centuries. The much smaller (0.27±0.07 km^{3}) 2010 eruption of Eyjafjallajökull caused worldwide disruptions of air travel, with economic losses of over $1 billion for airlines alone, because volcanic ash can interfere with the operation of airplane engines. Additional hazards of a widespread aerosol layer are its corrosive effects on equipment, decreased visibility leading to accidents on the sea, as well as health hazards resulting from the aerosols. The impact could extend to North Africa.

== See also ==
- Geography of Iceland
- Glacial lake outburst flood
- Iceland hotspot
- Iceland plume
- List of glaciers of Iceland
- List of lakes of Iceland
- Timeline of volcanism on Earth
- Volcanism of Iceland
  - List of volcanic eruptions in Iceland
  - List of volcanoes in Iceland
