= 1918 eruption of Katla =

Volcanic event in Iceland

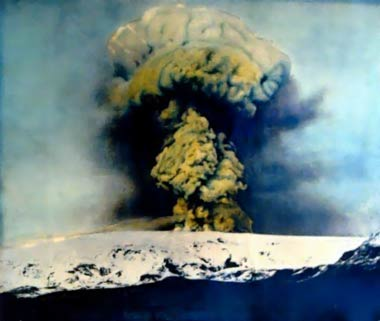
- Coloured in photo of Katla volcano erupting through Mýrdalsjökull ice cap in 1918
- Volcano: Katla
- Start date: 12 October 1918
- End date: 4 November 1918
- Type: hydromagmatic basaltic eruption
- Location: Southern Region, Iceland; 63°38′N 19°03′W
- VEI: 4
- Impact: 3 farms abandoned, depopulation

Maps
- Approximate areas significantly affected by 1918 Katla eruption. Key: Vents; 10 cm tephra isopach; 5 cm tephra isopach which is relevant due to fluoride content and damage to agriculture; First phase jökulhlaup; Combined first and second phase jökulhlaup. Jökulhlaup subsurface catchment at the time is not shown.; Twenty-first century glacier surface catchments (Note: The jökulhlaup subsurface catchment is defined by the southern caldera rim and this eruptions vents were just north of this (see Katla for caldera maps). Jökulhlaup flow was initially on the surface as well as subsurface to the 1918 glaciers before becoming solely subsurface. Some of the ice below the caldera rim is locked in until it melts so does not contribute to usual outlet glacier catchments.); More detail is available by clicking to enlarge map that enables mouse-over.

Between October and November 1918 a series of jökulhlaups, a type of glacial outburst flood, following an eruption of Katla in Iceland caused significant property damage and disruption in Iceland with local depopulation.

== Background ==
Katla is an active volcano in the south-east of Iceland. It is covered by the Mýrdalsjökull ice cap. Over 300 basaltic eruptions may have occurred in the Holocene. The 1918 eruption was amongst the largest 20th century eruptions in Iceland.

== Geology ==
This was a typical hydromagmatic basaltic eruption below the Mýrdalsjökull ice cap, although explosive silicic eruptions are known from the volcano.

The eruption produced a bulk volume of tephra of up to 1.2 km^{3} (0.29 cu mi) and eruption cloud height of at least 14 km (8.7 mi). The total dry rock equivalent erupted was up to 0.9 km^{3} (0.22 cu mi). (Note: Dry rock equivalent can not be assumed to be the same as dense-rock equivalent the more usual terminology.)

== Events ==
Seismic signs of unrest are reported to have started at about 11:30am local time on 12 October 1918 with ripples observed in a bucket of water and at about 1pm an earthquake was felt at Vík í Mýrdal. Observers in the Vestmannaeyjar Islands mention steam from the volcano about an hour before the eruptive column was sighted there. (Note: The detailed sequence of events can only be speculated upon as they were not subjected to modern real time observation techniques. Timing was mainly based on where in the sky the sun was which at the time split daylight into 8 periods. The observation of prior steam is consistent with geothermal melting of ice before the eruption so one possibility is that the first phase jökulhlaup by relief of pressure triggered the major eruption. Against this is the observation of glacial surface jökulhlaup flow in the first phase jökulhlaup. There is no preferred interpretation in the literature. See the article jökulhlaup for more detail on this and other possibilities.) The eruption column and initial flood were first noted locally at about 3pm taking observers by surprise, and with their immediate realisation that they would have to flee to high ground.

Some described the evening and night after the initial eruption as pitch black with inability to see their hands due to the tephra fall, and also described "lightning was so severe that it looked like the middle of the day even though it was night." They could hear the surrounding flood waters but not see the flood.

Tephra fall was very intense overnight on the 12th, and lasted through to the 14th. A second intense tephra fall occurred between 22 and 24 October. The final light tephra fall was on 1 November 1918.

Eruptive activity is assumed to have continued until 18 October when the plume as not observed. On the 20th twin plumes, suggesting at least two separate vents were noted, and the plume was described two days later as more magnificent than before. The last day that steam was seen arising was 4 November.

=== Jökulhlaups ===
The jökulhlaup that inundated the largest area, with a peak flow of 300,000 m^{3}/s (11,000,000 cu ft/s), occurred within minutes of the first eruptive events according to those nearby. This first phase jökulhlaup lasted about 3 hours but was followed about 2 hours later by a more limited in area second phase jökulhlaup, that delivered much ice and sediment to the Mýrdalssandur flood plain east of the Múlakvísl river. This second phase jökulhlaup lasted about 5 hours. The flood flowed down the flood plain at a velocity of 20 km/h (3.5 mi/ks) and resulted in the temporary extension of southern coastline of Iceland by 4 km (2.5 mi) into the sea. Smaller jökulhlaups occurred from the 14th onward to the 18th on essentially a daily basis in the same area as the second phase jökulhlaup, but flooding had stopped by 26 October when the flood plain had mainly dried out. A jökulhlaup occurred on 28 October and after the eruption had stopped on 26 November.

=== Impact ===
Near Álftaver three farms were abandoned for good, and a local population of 129 people was reduced a year later by 17% and in 1920 by 23%. A bridge was swept away and communications disrupted across the Mýrdalssandur until the last jökulhlaup related to the eruption. Four farms (including those 3 abandoned) were seriously damaged by tephra falls and seventeen farms were damaged. Trout fishing was disrupted up to 70 km (43 mi) to the north.
