= Katla Geopark =

Geopark in Iceland

Katla Geopark is the first Geopark to be designated in Iceland, having gained membership of both the European Geoparks Network and the UNESCO-assisted Global Network of National Geoparks in 2011.

Amongst others, it includes the volcanoes Katla and Eyjafjallajökull, the latter renowned for the disruption which its eruption in 2010 caused to European air travel.
