= Ófærufoss =

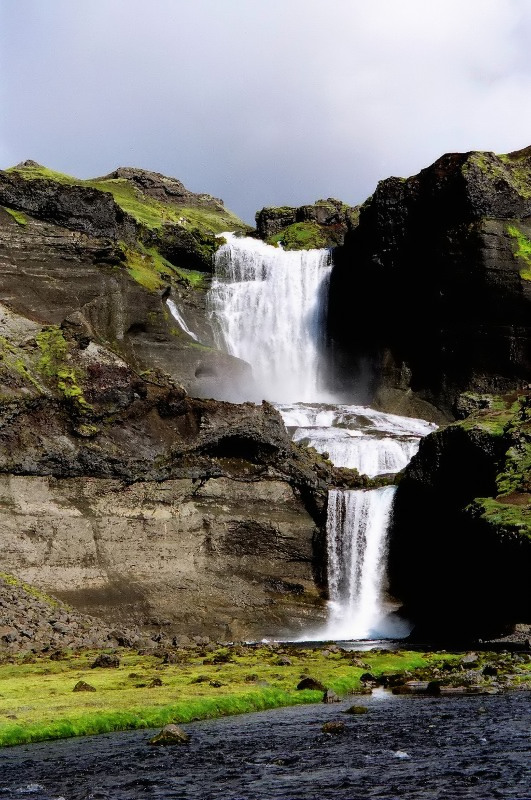

- Location within Iceland
- Location: South of Iceland
- Coordinates: 63°57′55.8″N 18°37′07.5″W
- Total height: 40 metres (130 ft)
- Number of drops: 2
- Watercourse: Norðari-Ófærá

Ófærufoss (Icelandic pronunciation: [ˈouːˌfaiːrʏˌfɔsː]) is a waterfall situated in the Eldgjá chasm in the western part of Vatnajökull National Park, Iceland. Until the early 1990s a natural bridge spanned the falls, but it collapsed from natural causes.

== See also ==
- List of waterfalls
- List of waterfalls in Iceland
