= Katla (volcano) =

Large volcano in Southern Iceland

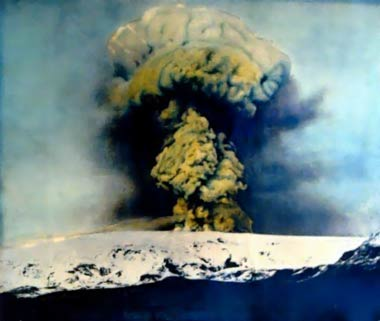
- Katla eruption, 1918

Highest point
- Elevation: 1,512 m (4,961 ft)
- Listing: List of volcanoes in Iceland
- Coordinates: 63°38′N 19°03′W

Geography
- Location within Iceland
- Selected geological features near the Katla central volcano and its Eldgjá fissure swarm (red outlines). Legend: Other shading shows: calderas; central volcanoes; fissure swarms; subglacial terrain above 1,100 m (3,600 ft); seismically active areas; Clicking on the rectangle in the image enlarges to full window and enables mouse-over with more detail.
- Location: Iceland

Geology
- Mountain type: Subglacial volcano
- Last eruption: October 12, 1918 (Note: The major 1918 eruption lasted until November 4 of that year) (Major); July 17, 1999 (Note: The minor 1999 eruption lasted until August 15 of that year) (Minor)

Katla (Icelandic pronunciation: [ˈkʰahtla]) is an active subglacial volcano in southern Iceland. This volcano has been very active historically with at least twenty documented major eruptions since 2920 BC. In its recent history though, Katla has been less active as the last major eruption occurred in 1918. These eruptions have had a Volcanic Explosivity Index (VEI) of between 4 and 5 on a scale of 0 to 8. In comparison, the 2010 Eyjafjallajökull eruption had a VEI of 4. Larger VEI-5 eruptions are comparable to Mount St. Helens 1980 eruption. These eruptions have produced very large glacial outburst floods. Several smaller (minor) events measuring VEI-1 and below have occurred since.

Katla is one of the largest volcanic sources of carbon dioxide (CO_{2}) on Earth, accounting for up to 4% of total global volcanic carbon dioxide emissions.

== Geography and physical appearances ==
Katla is one of the largest volcanoes in Iceland. It is situated to the north of Vík í Mýrdal and to the east of the smaller glacier Eyjafjallajökull. Its peak reaches 1,512 metres (4,961 ft) and is partially covered by the Mýrdalsjökull glacier. The system has an area of 595 km^{2} (230 sq mi). The Eldgjá canyon is part of the same volcanic system, and extends as a fissure swarm to the north-east. The lavas from this eruption in 939 to 940 almost reach the south eastern coast, although are partially buried.

The caldera of the Katla volcano has a diameter of 10 km (6 mi) and is covered with 200–700 metres (660–2,300 ft) of ice. The volcano normally erupts every 40–80 years. The flood discharge at the peak of an eruption in 1755 has been estimated at 200,000–400,000 m^{3}/s (7.1–14.1 million cu ft/sec), comparable to the combined average discharge of the Amazon, Mississippi, Nile, and Yangtze rivers (about 266,000 m^{3}/s (9.4 million cu ft/sec)).

== Etymology ==
The name Katla derives from the word ketill ("kettle"), referring to the form of the volcano. Katla is also used as a female first name.

== Historic activity ==
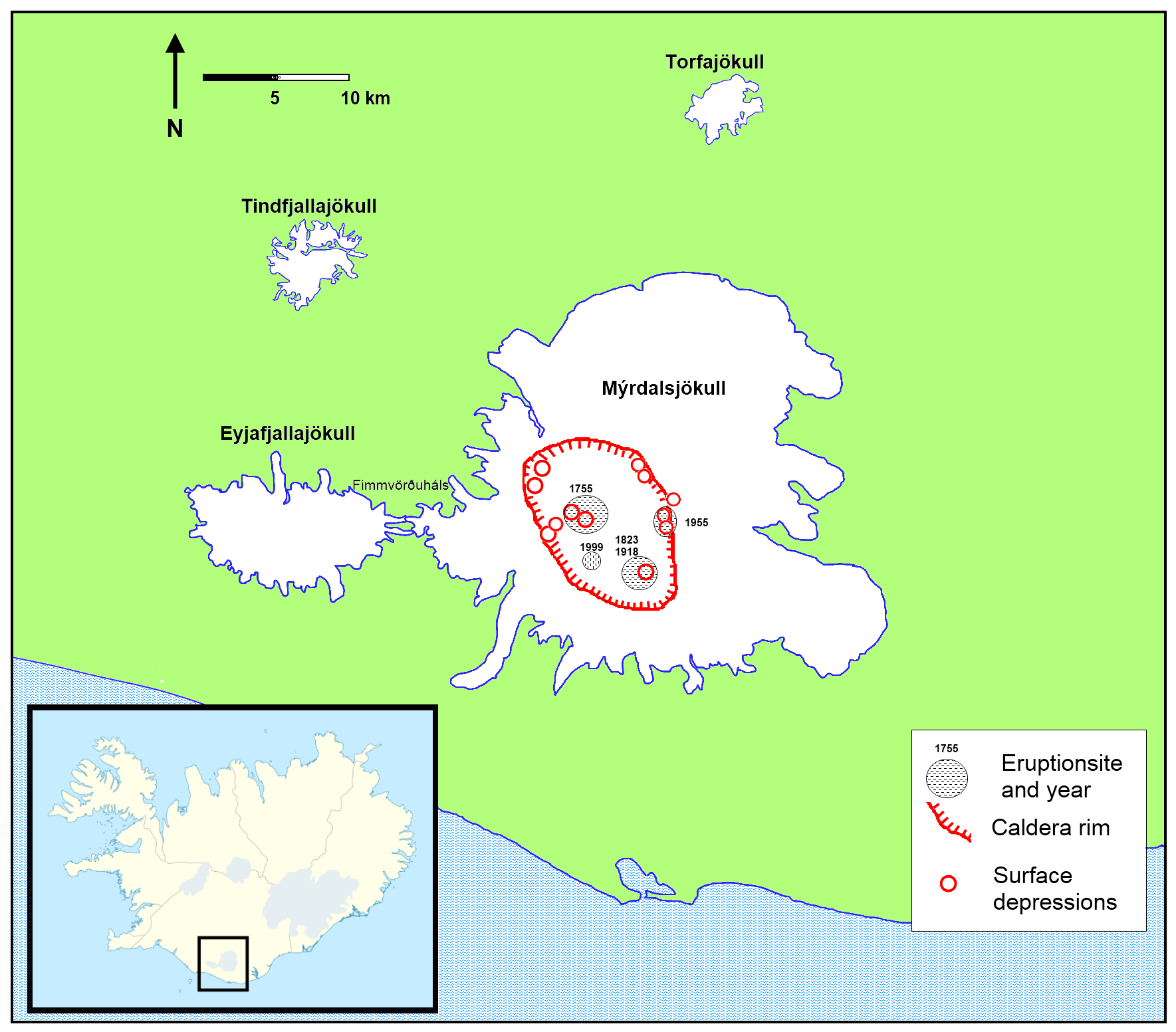
Locations of caldera rim and previous eruptions from 1755 to 1999. The surface depressions shown are updated elsewhere on this page. (Note: The ice cauldrons (ice depressions) mapped on this page are those that have been defined in the literature and in the public facing aspect of the University of Iceland data base at the time of map preparation. The initial 1991 mapping only defined 12 and there are 20 by 2019. There have been activity changes, and positions of the centre of the ice depression may have changed slightly with time.)

There have been up to twenty three eruptions recorded for Katla since 920 CE. Only two people are known to have died because of events directly associated with one of these eruptions in 1755. The 1918 eruption of Katla started in the late afternoon of 12 October 1918 and lasted for 24 days, with the first day having the most dangerous events, including an extremely large flood with peak flow of 300,000 m^{3}/s (11,000,000 cu ft/s). It has been graded a VEI 4 level eruption. The 1918 eruption resulted in extending the southern coast by 4 km (2.5 mi) due to laharic flood deposits.

Most of these eruptions resulted in glacial floods (jökulhlaups). Some Mýrdalsjökull jökulhlaups have been associated with catastrophic flooding which results from peak discharges of more than 100,000 m^{3}/s (3,500,000 cu ft/s), which is ten to a hundred times the size of most jökulhlaups. Apart from the 1755 and 1918 eruptions already mentioned in this regard, both of which like the majority of large floods drained onto the Mýrdalssandur plain to the volcanoes south-east, an eruption in 822 drained from the north-east aspect of the caldera down the Markarfljót river flood plain to the mountain's south-west covering an area of 600 km^{2} (230 sq mi). This is a convoluted route that outputs on to a large flood plain, the Markarfljótsaurar. Before the Hringvegur (Iceland's Ring Road) was constructed in 1974, people feared traversing the plains in front of the volcano because of the frequent jökulhlaup (or glacier bursts) and the deep river crossings.

== Recent activity ==
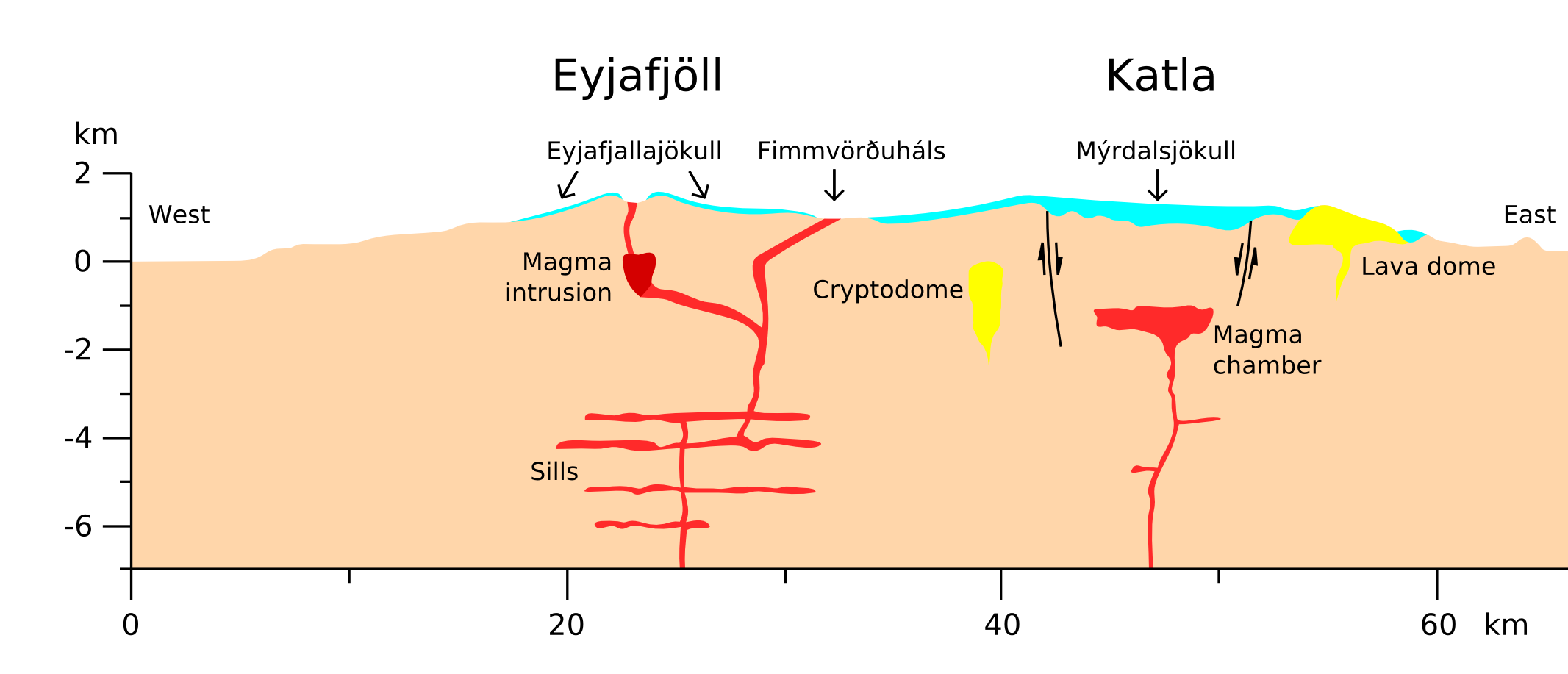
Schematic cross-section from west to east across the Eyjafjallajökull and Katla volcanoes. Magmatic intrusions are drawn in red, rhyolitic domes and the cryptodome in yellow; glaciers are shown in light blue.

Katla has been showing signs of unrest since 1999, and geologists have concerns that it might erupt in the near future. The volcano's present dormancy is among the longest in its known history. Particularly, monitoring has been intensified following the March 2010 eruptions of a smaller neighbouring volcano, the Eyjafjallajökull glacier. The eruption of this nearby long-dormant volcano in March and April 2010 prompted fears among some geophysicists that it might trigger an eruption at the larger and more dangerous Katla. In the past 1,000 years, all three known eruptions of Eyjafjallajökull have triggered subsequent Katla eruptions.

Following the 2010 Eyjafjallajökull eruptions, on 20 April 2010 Icelandic President Ólafur Grímsson said "the time for Katla to erupt is coming close ... we [Iceland] have prepared ... it is high time for European governments and airline authorities all over Europe and the world to start planning for the eventual Katla eruption".

Increased earthquake activity had been noticed on Katla since the eruption at Eyjafjallajökull, but no other signs of an imminent eruption were observed. These quakes are located mainly on the northwestern rim of the caldera. On 9 October 2010, a sudden rise in harmonic tremor was observed in the stations around Katla, but although a sign of a possible impending eruption, none occurred.

=== 2011 activity ===
In 2011, geologic activity led many to speculate that a very small subglacial eruption had taken place. In June 2011, harmonic tremor was again detected at Katla volcano. A few days later, an earthquake swarm took place in the caldera, indicating magma movement inside the volcano, leading to increased fears of an eruption in the near future.

On 8 and 9 July 2011, another spike in harmonic tremors occurred, as a small eruption of Katla took place. Cracks formed on the glacier, as well as a cauldron. Icelandic media reported a small subglacial eruption might have started. On the morning of 9 July 2011, a glacier flood was reported in the river Múlakvísl, and also later in the river Skálm. The bridge across Múlakvísl was destroyed as well as other parts of the road, Route 1, on the Icelandic ring road. Helicopter pilots flying over the glacier also reported cracks in the glacier. Scientists monitoring the activity said speculation that it was caused by a "very small" subglacial eruption lacked confirmation by visual or seismic evidence.

=== 2016 and 2017 activity ===
Tremors were detected under Katla in late August 2016.

A "Specialist Description" describing the activity on 29 August 2016 noted that there was:

... a seismic swarm in Mýrdalsjökull on the 29th of August with two events in the northern Katla caldera rim measured at magnitude 4.5. These are the biggest earthquakes in Katla volcano since 1977. Earthquake eruption checks confirmed that most earthquakes occurred between 0:40 and 1:50 PM. The big earthquakes were about thirty seconds apart at 1:47. They were followed by more than 50 aftershocks until 15:12 PM, when there was an earthquake of magnitude 3.3 and then the cycle and seismic activity in the region reduced again. No unrest was measured along these earthquakes. The geothermal has decreased in the following week and is now negligible.

An update written at 11 Sep 16:38 GMT reported:

Today, shortly before 14:00, a small earthquake swarm began in Mýrdalsjökull. The largest earthquakes of the swarm were of magnitude 3.3 and 3.0 at 16:12 and 15:57. More than 10 smaller earthquakes were detected in the swarm. All of the earthquakes were shallow and located in the caldera of Katla volcano. It is not unusual for seismic swarms of this type to occur in this area.

In February 2017, seismic activity at the volcano continued.

Eruptions
Start Date	End Date	VEI	Scale	Tephra volume (km^{3})	Comment
July 9, 2011	2011	Unknown		Unknown	This eruptions details are uncertain, with unclear end time, but a jökulhlaup occurred that damaged a bridge.
July 17, 1999	August 15, 1999	0	Minor	Unknown	This eruption is uncertain, and could have been subglacial. A jökulhlaup occurred.
June 25, 1955	Unknown	0	Minor	Unknown	This eruption is uncertain, and could have been subglacial. A jökulhlaup occurred.
October 12, 1918	November 4, 1918	4	Major	0.7	Last major eruption of Katla. A jökulhlaup occurred.
May 8, 1860	May 27, 1860	4	Major	0.2	Dated using historical records. A jökulhlaup occurred.
June 26, 1823	July 23, 1823	3	Minor	0.1	This eruption was dated using historical records. The eruption "VEI" is speculated. A jökulhlaup occurred.
October 17, 1755	February 13, 1756	5	Major	1.5	This eruption was dated using historical records. The eruption "VEI" is speculated. A jökulhlaup occurred. The two people who died were struck by lightning.
May 11, 1721	October 15, 1721 (Note: ±45 days)	5	Major	1.2	This eruption was dated using historical records. The eruption "VEI" is speculated. A jökulhlaup occurred.
November 3, 1660	1661	4	Major	0.2	Dated using historical records. A jökulhlaup occurred.
September 2, 1625	September 14, 1625	5	Major	1.5	Dated using historical records. A jökulhlaup occurred.
October 12, 1612	Unknown	4	Major	0.2	Dated using historical records. A jökulhlaup occurred.
August 11, 1580	Unknown	4	Major	0.2	Dated using historical records.
1550	Unknown	4	Major	0.2	The estimated date is based on tephrochronology.
1500	Unknown	4	Major	0.2	The estimated date is based on tephrochronology.
1440	Unknown	4	Major	0.2	Dated using historical records.
1416	Unknown	4	Major	0.2	While this eruption is dated using historical records, the VEI and tephra volume amounts are speculated.
1357 (Note: ±3 years)	Unknown	4	Major	0.7	Dated using historical records.
1262	Unknown	5	Major	1.5	Dated using historical records.
1245	Unknown	4	Major	0.2	Dated using historical records.
1210	Unknown	4	Major	0.1	The estimated date is based on tephrochronology.
1177	Unknown	3	Minor	0.01	Dated using historical records.
960	Unknown	3	Minor	0.05	The estimated date is based on tephrochronology.
939	940	4	Major	5.0	The Eldgjá eruption estimated VEI is based on an ice core. Dated using historical records, ice core and tephrochronology
920	Unknown	4	Major	0.2	Dated using historical records.
822 (Note: ±6 months)	823	-	Major	small	large sulfate, likely effusive and earliest accurately dated Katla eruption (possibly AT-4) and jökulhlaup to late 822 to early 823 by tree ring data. (Note: Size estimated compared to 920 and 939 Greenland ice core data but no VTE estimate)
751	763	-	Major	4.5	Multiple eruptions with both sulfate and tephra peaks in Greenland core (Hrafnkatla, AT-8 or E2). Largest eruptions were 757 and 763. May include K1220 and K1270 from Torfdalsvatn alkali basalt tephras which include 5 events.
270 (Note: ±12 years)	Unknown	3	Minor	0.085	Based on radiocarbon dating.
850 BC (Note: ±50 years)	Unknown	4	Major	0.29	Based on radiocarbon dating.
1220 BC	Unknown	3	Minor	0.065	Based on radiocarbon dating.
1440 BC (Note: ±40 years)	Unknown	4	Major	0.22	Based on radiocarbon dating.
1920 BC	Unknown	4	Major	0.13	Based on radiocarbon dating.
2920 BC	Unknown	3	Minor	0.075	The estimated date is based on tephrochronology.
4540 BC (Note: ±130 years)	Unknown	Unknown	-	Unknown	Alkali basalt tephra, the date is based on tephrochronology.
9250 BC (Note: ±330 years)	Unknown	Unknown	-	Unknown	Rhyolite tephra in 3 events, the date is based on tephrochronology.
9410 BC (Note: ±340 years)	Unknown	Unknown	-	Unknown	Rhyolite tephra, the date is based on tephrochronology.
9425 BC	Unknown	Unknown	-	Unknown	Rhyolite tephra, the date is based on tephrochronology.

== Other activity ==
Arrows show jökulhlaup flows from Mýrdalsjökull ice cap. Ice cauldrons are shown in violet:
1:from Kötlujökull to Leirá in 1721, 1755, 1918
2:from From Kötlujökull / Sandfellsjökull to Austastikælir stream / Skálm river in 1612, 1625, 1660, 1721, 1755, 1823, 1860, 1918, 2024
3:from Kötlujökull to Blautakvísl river area of Mýrdalssandur in (1625), 1660, 1755, 1823, 1918
4:from Kötlujökull to Múlakvísl river area of Mýrdalssandur towards Kötlutangi and Höfðabrekkufjara beaches in 1612, 1625, 1660, 1721, 1755, 1823, 1860, 1918
5:from Kötlujökull to Múlakvísl river area of Mýrdalssandur towards Höfðabrekkufjara beach in 1612, 1625, 1660, 1721, 1755, 1823, 1860, 1918, 1955, 1999, 2011, 2014, 2017
6:from Múlakvísl river area towards Kerlingardalsfjara beach in 1660, 1721, 1755, 1823, 1860
7:from Sólheimajökull towards Sólheimasandur in 1860, 1999
8:from Jökulsárgilsjökull towards Jökulsárgil in 1936
9:from Entujökull down Markarfljót in 874.

In addition to eruptions, Katla is host to geothermal systems that contribute to many of the smaller jökulhlaups from the mountain. Jökulhlaup triggering at Mýrdalsjökull may result from geothermal processes, and ice dams and their sudden removal by floating of the ice above a lake of melt water. Some eruptions could be secondary to the removal of overpressure by a jökulhlaup. There are currently at least 20 ice cauldrons known related to the geothermal areas within the caldera. These are often manifest as depressions in the ice cap rather than full thickness to the underlying rock cauldrons and have variable activity. Geothermal waters with a high volcanic mineral and gas content are produced and can result in both gas and water pollution.

== Risks ==
The area of the volcano contributes to the most serious natural hazard area of Iceland. The most likely large eruption had in 2019 a 89% probability of occurring within 30 years and would likely be associated with tephra production of about 1.5 km^{3} (0.36 cu mi) which can be compared with the 0.25 km^{3} (0.060 cu mi) that disrupted air travel from the second phase of the 2010 eruptions of Eyjafjallajökull. It is most likely to occur in the months June to September, and be associated with a jökulhlaup flowing from Kotlujökull an outlet glacier to the south-east, over Mýrdalssandur to the sea where it could affect the town of Vík í Mýrdal. The 1755 and 1918 eruptions show that lightning and tephra fall are perceived as dangerous by humans in the immediate vicinity of a large eruption and have influenced jökulhlaup evacuation planning. Geothermal jökulhlaups can be large enough to damage property and infrastructure.

=== Monitoring ===
Because of such risks the volcano is intensively monitored. The Icelandic Meteorological Office updates its website with reports of quakes both at Eyjafjallajökull and Katla. Continuous monitoring includes for seismic flood tremor, water gauges and water conductivity given the flood risk. The ice cauldrons of Mýrdalsjökull are also monitored.

== Folklore ==
In folklore, the witch named Katla is held responsible for causing the jökulhlaup (outburst) of the Mýrdalsjökull glacier over the volcano; these events are dubbed Kötluhlaup (or "Katla's eruption"). The folktale recorded by Jón Árnason in 1862 probably dates much older since it is set in the time of the Þykkvabæjarklaustur, the Catholic monastery abolished c. 1550.

The short folktale entitled "Katla eða Kötlugjá" can be summarized as follows: In the pre-Reformation days when the Þykkvibær monastery was installed with an abbot, they had a cranky housekeeper there named Katla, well versed in (ancient) magic (fjölkynngi), instilling fear in others. She owned a magical pair of breeches (brók, 'trousers'), which allowed its wearer to run endlessly without fatigue, but herself reserved its use for an emergency. One day in autumn, the abbot's shepherd Barði has trouble rounding up the sheep before master and the housekeep return from a banquet, and he borrows the breeches to retrieve the stray. Katla discovers the transgression and ambushes him, drowning him in a vat of sour whey (sýruker). (Note: Corrected to nominative case from Nordvig (2019), p. 76.) But as winter wore on, the whey began to dwindle and Katla was heard muttering "Barði will soon appear". Realizing the discovery of her crime and punishment was imminent, she put on her breeches and disappeared to the northwest, presumably diving straight into the glacier. Right afterwards a glacial outburst (jökulhlaup) occurred that rushed towards the monastery and Álftaver.

Other geologic features such as Kötlugja ('Katla's gorge') and the surrounding area made desolate, named Kötlusandur also bear names alluding to the Katla folklore.

== Images ==
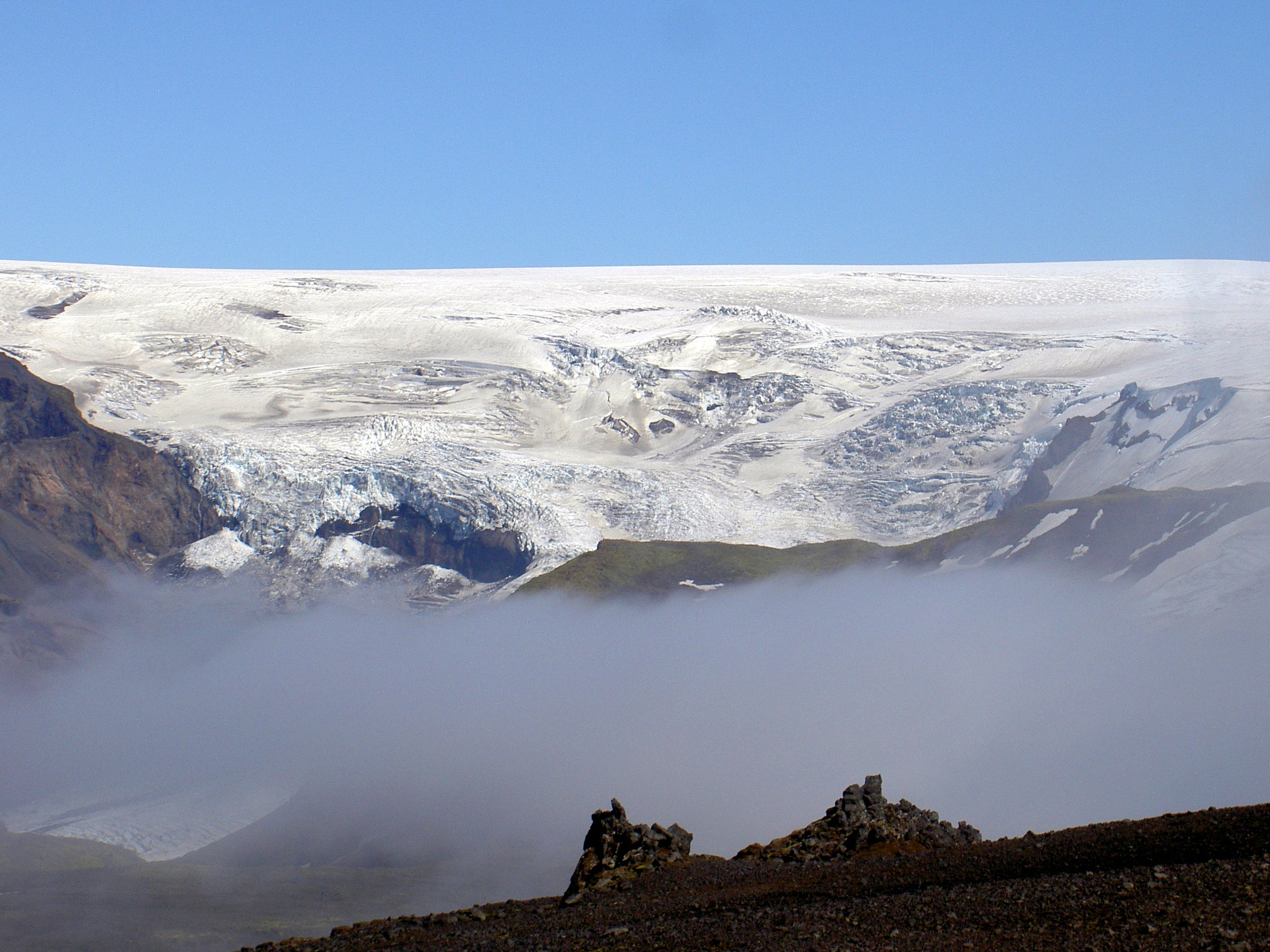
The Mýrdalsjökull glacier in 2005

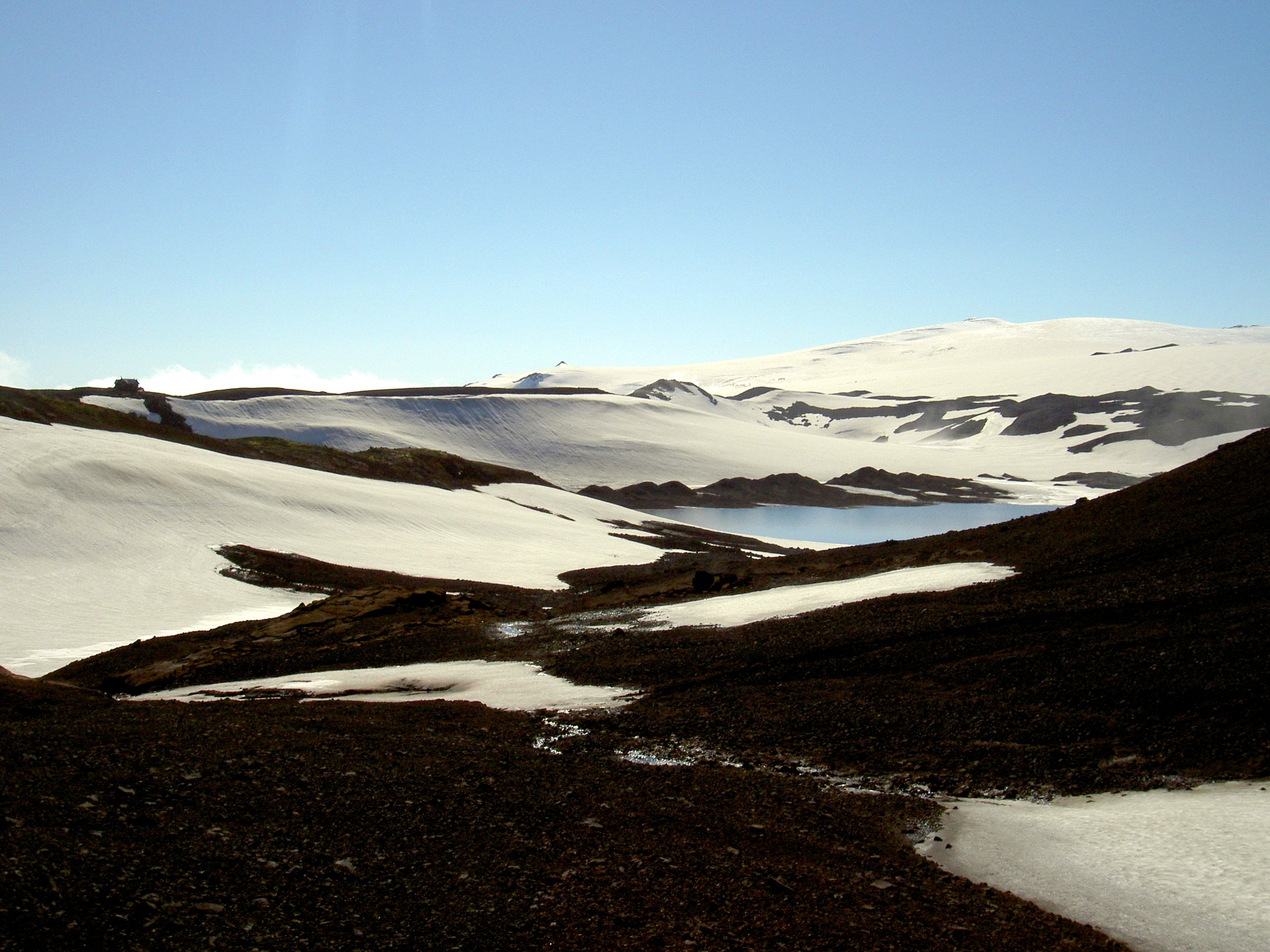
The Mýrdalsjökull glacier in 2005

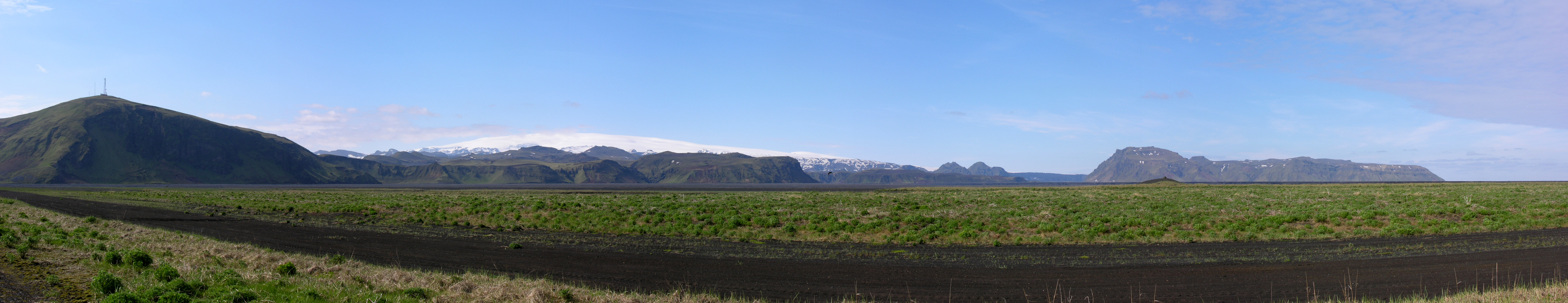
Katla from the Myrdalssandur flood plain in 2008

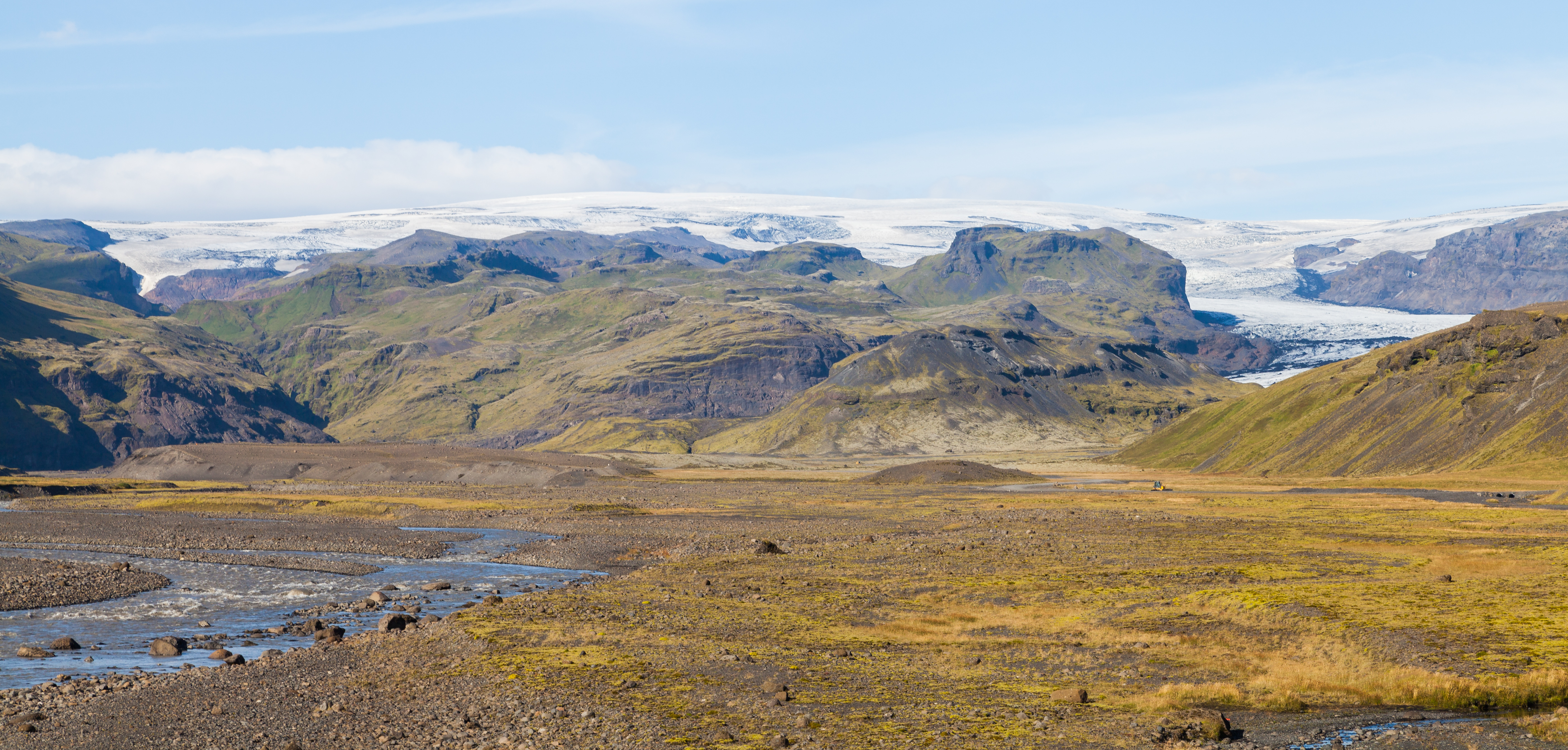
Katla in 2017

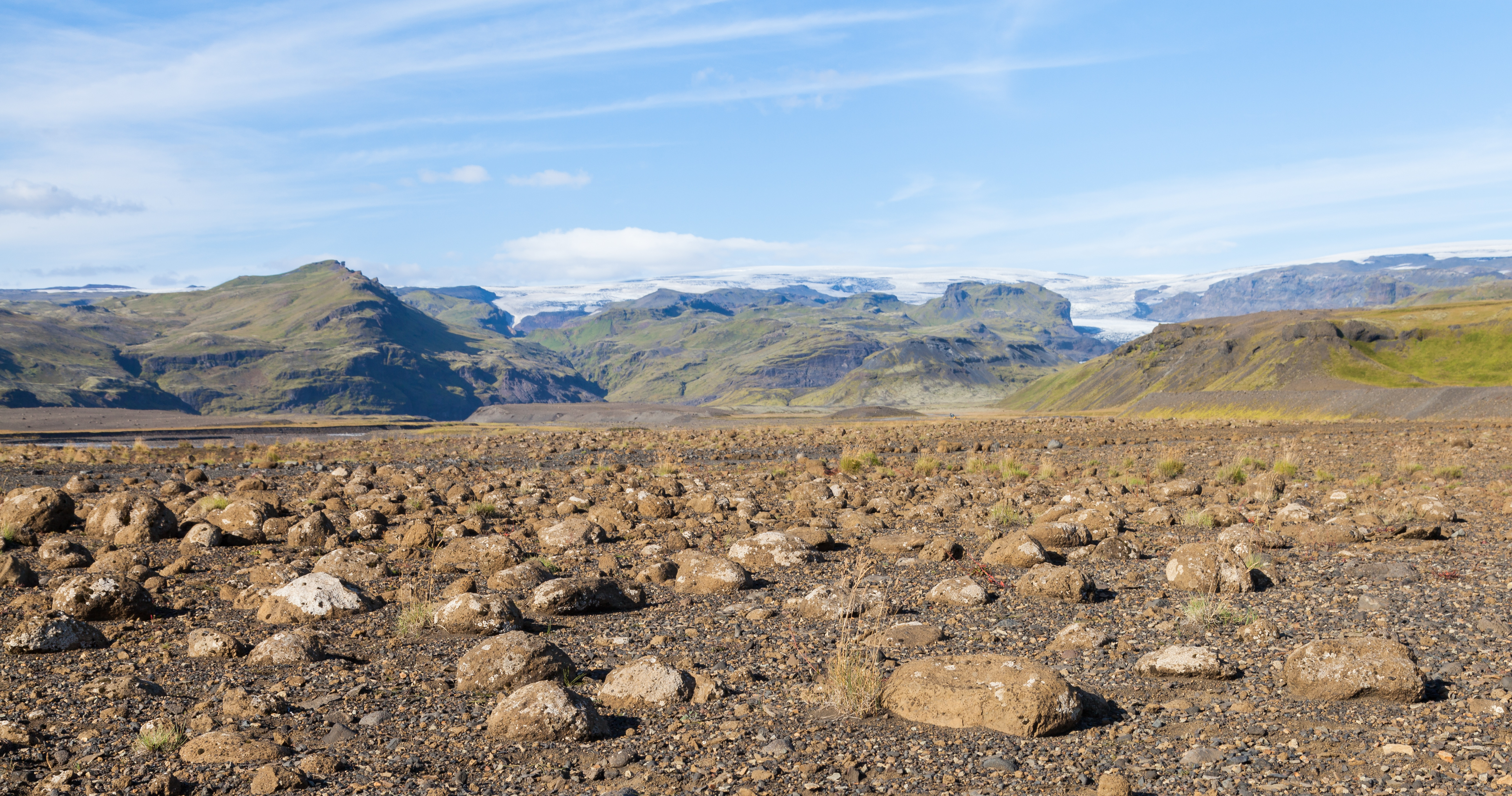
wider view of Katla in 2017

== In popular culture ==
Katla is the subject of Katla, an Icelandic TV series produced for Netflix.

== See also ==
- Glacial lake outburst flood
- Ice cauldron
- Iceland hotspot
- Iceland plume
- List of glaciers of Iceland
- Volcanism of Iceland
  - List of volcanic eruptions in Iceland
  - List of volcanoes in Iceland
