= Jökulhlaup =

Type of glacial outburst flood

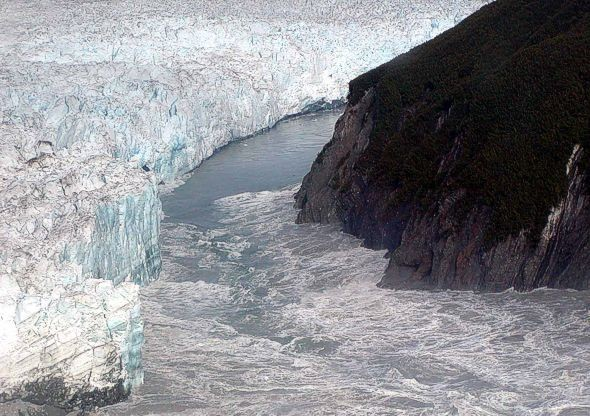
A jökulhlaup

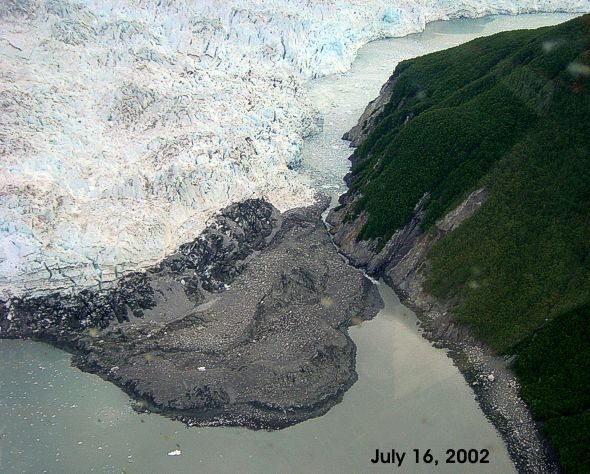
The impounded lake a month earlier, before the same jökulhlaup

A jökulhlaup (Icelandic pronunciation: [ˈjœːkʏl̥ˌl̥œyp]; literally 'glacial run') is a type of glacial outburst flood. It is an Icelandic term that has been adopted in glaciological terminology in many languages. It originally referred to the well-known subglacial outburst floods from Vatnajökull, Iceland, which are triggered by geothermal heating and occasionally by a volcanic subglacial eruption, but it is now used to describe any large and abrupt release of water from a subglacial or proglacial lake/reservoir.

Since jökulhlaups emerge from hydrostatically sealed lakes with floating levels far above the threshold, their peak discharge can be much larger than that of a marginal or extra-marginal lake burst. The hydrograph of a jökulhlaup from Vatnajökull typically either climbs over a period of weeks with the largest flow near the end, or it climbs much faster during the course of some hours. These patterns are suggested to reflect channel melting, and sheet flow under the front, respectively. Similar processes on a very large scale occurred during the deglaciation of North America and Europe after the last ice age (e.g., Lake Agassiz and the English Channel), and presumably at earlier times, although the geological record is not well preserved.

== Formation process ==
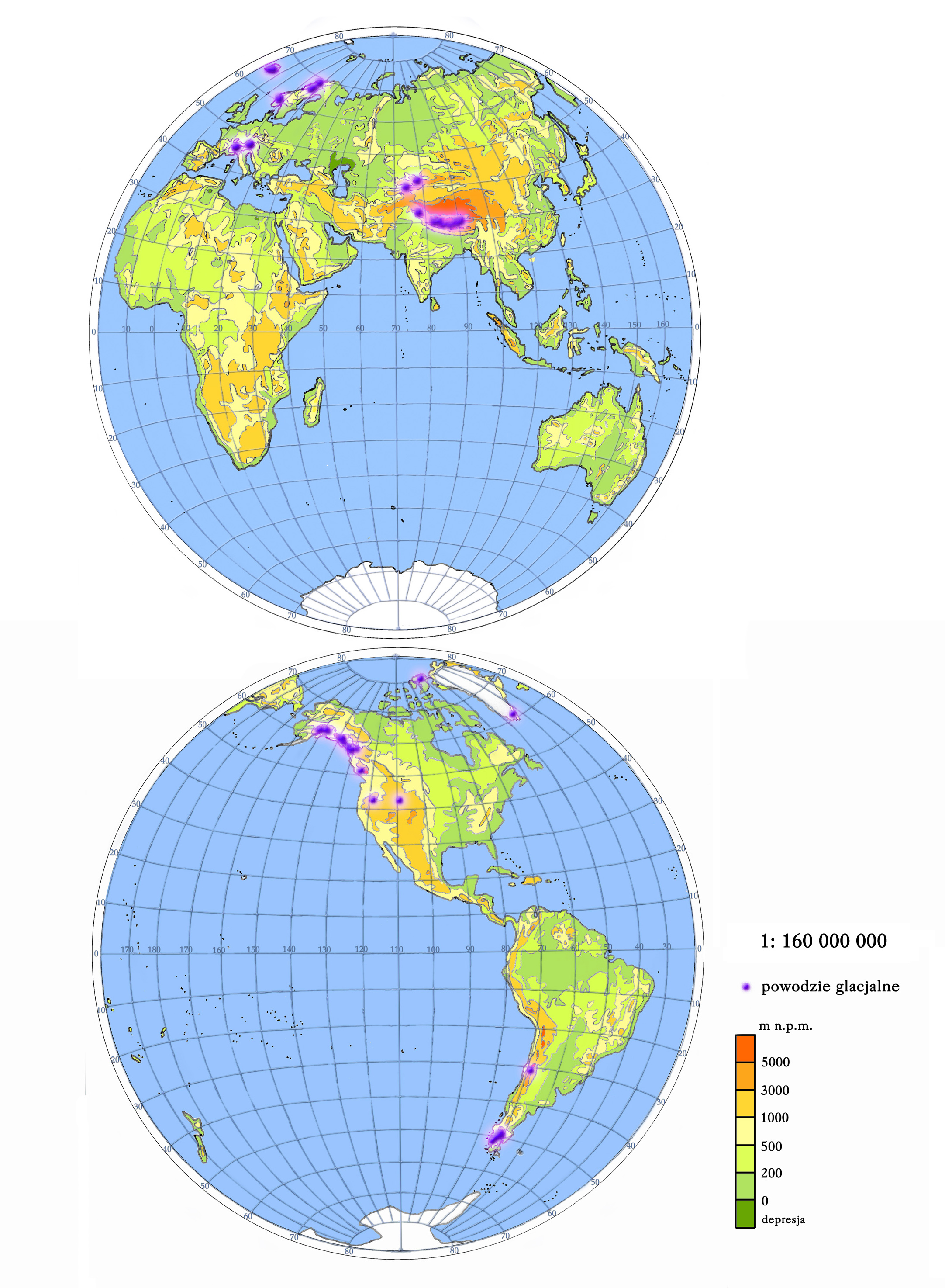
Jökulhlaup landforms in the world

=== Subglacial water generation ===
Subglacial meltwater may be produced on the glacier surface (supraglacially), below the glacier (basally) or in both locations. Ablation (surface melting) tends to result in surface pooling. Basal melting results from geothermal heat flux out of the earth, which varies with location, as well as from friction heating which results from the ice moving over the surface below it. In 1997 analyses concluded that, based on basal meltwater production rates, the annual production of subglacial water from one typical northwestern Germany catchment was 642×10^{6} m^{3} during the last Weichselian glaciation.

=== Supraglacial and subglacial water flow ===
Meltwater may flow either above the glacier (supraglacially), below the glacier (subglacially/basally) or as groundwater in an aquifer below the glacier as a result of the hydraulic transmissivity of the subsoil under the glacier. If the rate of production exceeds the rate of loss through the aquifer, then water will collect in surface or subglacial ponds or lakes.

The signatures of supraglacial and basal water flow differ with the passage zone. Supraglacial flow is similar to stream flow in all surface environments—water flows from higher areas to lower areas under the influence of gravity. Basal flow under the glacier exhibits significant differences. In basal flow the water, either produced by melting at the base or drawn downward from the surface by gravity, collects at the base of the glacier in ponds and lakes in a pocket overlain by hundreds of metres of ice. If there is no surface drainage path, water from surface melting will flow downward and collect in crevices in the ice, while water from basal melting collects under the glacier; either source can form a subglacial lake. The hydraulic head of the water collected in a basal lake will increase as water drains through the ice until the pressure grows high enough either to force a path through the ice or to float the ice above it.

=== Episodic releases ===
If meltwater accumulates, the discharges are episodic under continental ice sheets as well as under Alpine glaciers. The discharge results when water collects, the overlying ice is lifted, and the water moves outward in a pressurized layer or a growing under-ice lake. Areas where the ice is most easily lifted (i.e. areas with thinner overlying ice sheets) are lifted first. Hence the water may move up the terrain underlying the glacier if it moves toward areas of lower overlying ice. As water collects, additional ice is lifted until a release path is created.

If no preexisting channel is present, the water is initially released in a broad-front jökulhlaup which can have a flow front that is tens of kilometres wide, spreading out in a thin front. As the flow continues, it tends to erode the underlying materials and the overlying ice, creating a tunnel valley channel even as the reduced pressure allows most of the glacial ice to settle back to the underlying surface, sealing off the broad front release and channelizing the flow. The direction of the channel is defined primarily by the overlying ice thickness and second by the gradient of the underlying earth, and may be observed to "run uphill" as the pressure of the ice forces the water to areas of lower ice coverage until it emerges at a glacial face. Hence the configuration of the various tunnel valleys formed by a specific glaciation provides a general mapping of the glacier thickness when the tunnel valleys were formed, particularly if the original surface relief under the glacier was limited.

The rapid, high-volume discharge is highly erosive, as evidenced by the debris found in tunnels and at the mouth of tunnels, which tends to be coarse rocks and boulders. This erosive environment is consistent with creation of tunnels over 400 m deep and 2.5 km wide, as have been observed in the Antarctic.

Piotrowski has developed a detailed analytic model of the process, which predicts a cycle as follows:

1. Meltwater is produced as a result of geothermal heating from below. Surface ablation water is not considered as it would be minimal at the glacial maximum and evidence indicates that surface water does not penetrate more than 100 meters into a glacier.
2. Meltwater initially drains through subglacial aquifers.
3. When the hydraulic transmissivity of the substratum is exceeded, subglacial meltwater accumulates in basins.
4. Water accumulates sufficiently to open the ice blockage in the tunnel valley which accumulated after the last discharge.
5. The tunnel valley discharges the meltwater excess—turbulent flow melts out or erodes the excess ice as well as eroding the valley floor.
6. As the water level drops, the pressure decreases until the tunnel valleys again close with ice and water flow ceases.

=== Human triggered ===
A subglacial lake in Iceland was inadvertently triggered by a borehole drilled through the overlying ice. The authors suggested that hydrofracturing crevasses and flooding of moulins by precipitation events may be natural triggers of jökulhlaups.

== Examples ==
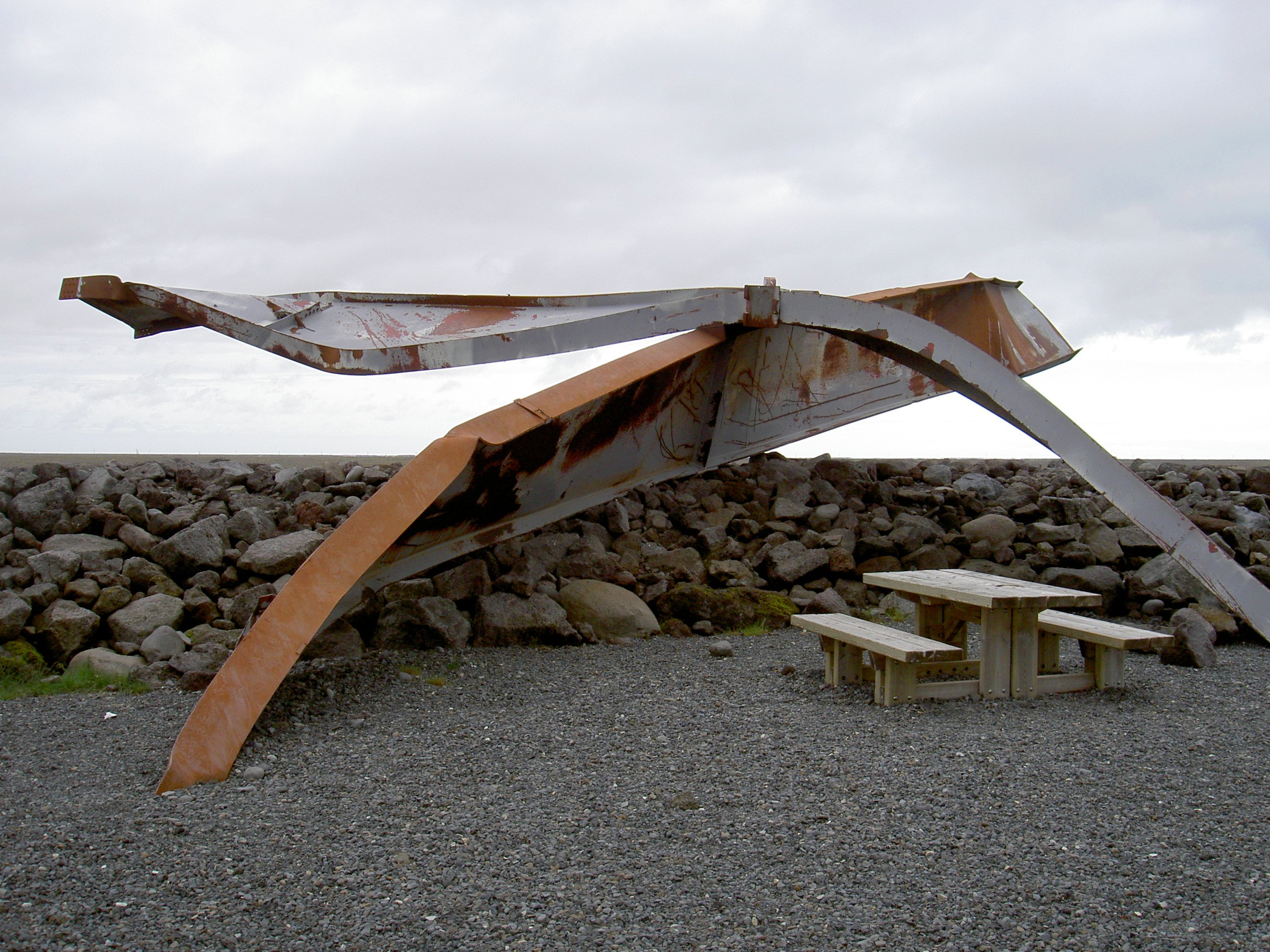
A former bridge at Skaftafell, Iceland, twisted by the jökulhlaup from Grímsvötn's 1996 eruption of Gjálp.

Example of catastrophic flooding by jökulhlaups from the 1918 eruption of Katla. Approximate area affected is shown in grey shading, with darker shading indicating combined first and second phase jökulhlaups on 12 October 1918. The eruption area is shaded in violet, and twenty-first century glacier surface catchments are shaded steel blue. Jökulhlaup catchments are different as they depend on subsurface features and prior to the eruption in 1918 glacier cover was larger than shown. More detail is available by clicking to enlarge map that enables mouse-over.

Whilst jökulhlaups were originally associated with Vatnajökull, they have been reported in the literature over a broad range of locations including the present day Antarctic, and there is evidence that they also occurred in the Laurentian ice sheet and the Scandinavian ice sheet during the Last Glacial Maximum.

=== Iceland ===
- Mýrdalsjökull is subject to large jökulhlaups when the subglacial volcano Katla erupts, roughly every 40 to 80 years. The eruption in 1755 is estimated to have had a peak discharge of 200,000 to 400,000 m^{3}/s (7,100,000 to 14,100,000 cu ft/s).
- The Grímsvötn volcano frequently causes large jökulhlaups from Vatnajökull. The 1996 eruption of Gjálp sent melt water southwards into Grímsvötn, that caused a jökulhlaup with a peak flow of 500,000 m^{3}/s (18,000,000 cu ft/s) and lasted for several days. This is the largest Grímsvötn glacial flood ever recorded.
- The Eyjafjallajökull volcano can cause jökulhlaups. The 2010 eruption caused a jökulhlaup with a peak flow of about 2,000 to 3,000 m^{3}/s (71,000 to 106,000 cu ft/s).

Work in Iceland has categorised jökulhlaups by origin and size. The categories of origin are:

- From an ice-dammed marginal lakes such as when an outlet glacier closes off an ice-free side valley.
  - Grænalón was a former example of such a lake.
- From a supraglacial lake formed by accumulation of melt water in a depression on the surface of the glacier.
  - Such jökulhlaups tend to be small in Iceland
- From a subglacial lake.
  - Tend to be formed by geothermal activity as found in the eastern and western Skaftá ice cauldrons and Grímsvötn.
- From a volcanic eruption underneath a glacier (subglacial eruption).
  - While melt water might flow immediately away from the eruption site, it might also accumulate near the site creating an unstable reservoir as has happened in the jökulhlaup from Eyjafjallajökull in 2010 and Katla eruptions underneath Mýrdalsjökull .
- From melting after a pyroclastic flow onto snow and ice in explosive eruptions in stratovolcanoes.
  - This type of flood may be a lahar and has happened at Hekla.
- From a glacier surge into a proglacial lake or at the end of the surge when the subglacial drainage system re-establishes itself.
  - The 1999 surge of Langjökull at its outlet glacier of Eystri-Hagafellsjökull was into a lake which then flooded downstream.
- From a landslide. Substantial potential energy is released in such slides, which can cause melting of ice and creation of flood water either if the slide falls onto a glacier or displaces water in a glacier dammed lake.
  - The 1967 rockslide onto the Steinsholtsjökull outlet glacier of Eyjafjallajökull caused such a flood.

University of Iceland jökulhlaup scale
Size Scale	Maximum flow	Terminology
0	< 1,000 m^{3}/s (35,000 cu ft/s)	Subtle flood
1	1,000 to 3,000 m^{3}/s (35,000 to 106,000 cu ft/s)	Little flood
2	3,000 to 10,000 m^{3}/s (110,000 to 350,000 cu ft/s)	Considerable flooding
3	10,000 to 30,000 m^{3}/s (350,000 to 1,060,000 cu ft/s)	Great flooding
4	30,000 to 100,000 m^{3}/s (1,100,000 to 3,500,000 cu ft/s)	Large flooding
5	> 100,000 m^{3}/s (3,500,000 cu ft/s)	Catastrophic flooding

=== North America ===
In July 1994, an ice-dammed surface lake drained via a subglacial tunnel through Goddard Glacier, in the British Columbian Coast Mountains, resulting in a jökulhlaup. The flood surge of from 100 to 300 m^{3}/second flowed 11 km through Farrow Creek to terminate in Chilko Lake, causing significant erosion. The ice dam has not reformed. Similar British Columbian jökulhlaups are summarized in the table below.

British Columbian jökulhlaups
Lake name	Year	Peak discharge (m^{3}/s)	Volume (km^{3})
Alsek	1850	30	4.5
Ape	1984	1600	0.084
Tide	1800	5,000-10,000	1.1
Donjek	1810	4000-6000	0.234
Summit	1967	2560	0.251
Tulsequah	1958	1556	0.229

As the Laurentide Ice Sheet receded from its maximum extent from around 21,000 to 13,000 years ago, two significant meltwater rerouting events occurred in eastern North America. Though there is still much debate among geologists as to where these events occurred, they likely took place when the ice sheet receded from the Adirondack Mountains and the St. Lawrence Lowlands.

- First, Glacial Lake Iroquois drained to the Atlantic in catastrophic Hudson Valley releases, as the receding ice sheet dam failed and re-established itself in three jökulhlaups. Evidence of the scale of the meltwater discharge down the Hudson Valley includes deeply incised sediments in the valley, large sediment deposit lobes on the continental shelf, and glacial erratic boulders greater than 2 metres in diameter on the outer shelf.
- Later, when the St. Lawrence Valley was deglaciated, Glacial Lake Candona drained to the North Atlantic, with subsequent drainage events routed through the Champlain Sea and St. Lawrence Valley. This surge of meltwater to the North Atlantic by jökulhlaup about 13,350 years ago is believed to have triggered the reduction in thermohaline circulation and the short-lived Northern Hemisphere Intra-Allerød cold period.
- Finally, Lake Agassiz was an immense glacial lake located in the center of North America. Fed by glacial runoff at the end of the last glacial period, its area was larger than all of the modern Great Lakes combined, and it held more water than contained by all lakes in the world today. It drained in a series of events between 13,000 BP and 8,400 BP.
- Also, into the Pacific Ocean, large drainage events took place through the Columbia River Gorge, dubbed the Missoula or Bretz Floods.
- Since 2011, periodic glacial floods have occurred from the Suicide Basin through the Mendenhall Glacier in Juneau, Alaska multiple times each year, with major such floods occurring in the summer of 2023 and 2024.

=== India ===
On 7 February 2021, part of Nanda Devi Glacier broke away in the 2021 Uttarakhand glacier burst, triggering outburst flood sweeping away a power plant. More than 150 people were feared dead.

=== Sweden ===
Around 9500 BC the Baltic Ice Lake was tapped on water as the ice front retreated north of mount Billingen.

== See also ==
- 1996 eruption of Gjálp
- Altai flood
- Diluvium
- Giant current ripples
- Glacial Lake Ojibway
- 1818 Giétro Glacier catastrophe
- Glacial lake outburst flood
- Outburst flood
