= Isopach map =

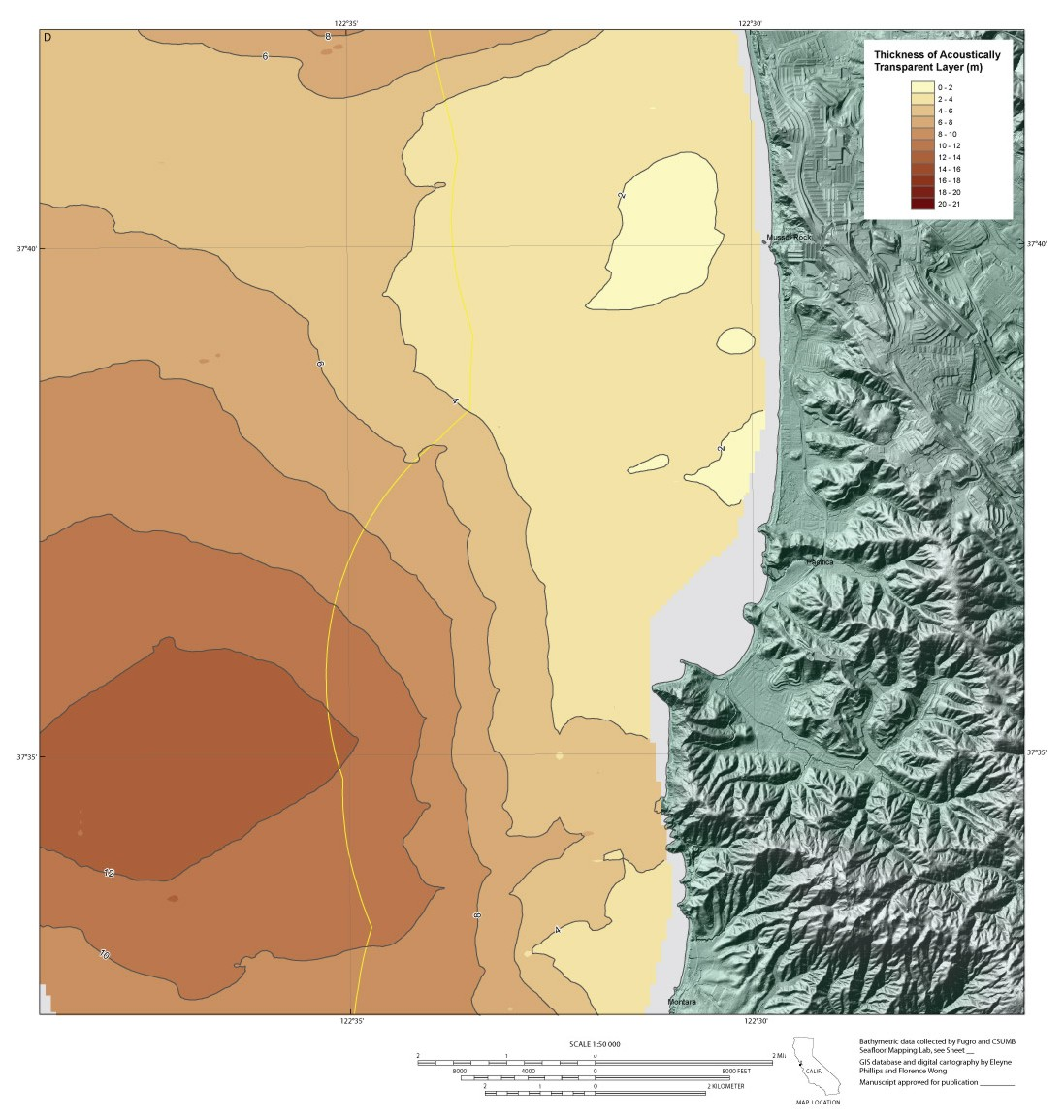
Isopach map showing true stratigraphic thickness of Holocene sediments deposited offshore of Pacifica, California

An isopach map (/ˈaɪsoʊpæk/) illustrates thickness variations within a tabular unit, layer or stratum. Isopachs are contour lines of equal thickness over an area. Isopach maps are utilized in hydrographic survey, stratigraphy, sedimentology, structural geology, petroleum geology and volcanology.

An isopach map is similar to an isochore map, but these terms actually describe different methods of displaying thickness variations within a layer.

- An isopach map displays lines of equal thickness in a layer where the thicknesses are measured perpendicular to the layer boundaries. Isopach maps are also referred to as True Stratigraphic Thickness (TST) maps.
- An isochore map displays lines of equal thickness in a layer where the thicknesses are measured vertically. Isochore maps in geology are also referred to as True Vertical Thickness (TVT) maps.

Thus, an isochore and isopach map are the same only when both the top and bottom surfaces of the layer shown are horizontal. When the layer shown is inclined, as is usually the case, the thicknesses displayed in an isochore map of the layer will be greater than the thicknesses displayed in an isopach map of the same layer. The terms isopach and isochore are widely confused, and many times maps of True Vertical Thickness (TVT), which by definition are isochore maps, are incorrectly labeled isopach maps.
