= Eyjafjallajökull =

Glacier and volcano in Iceland

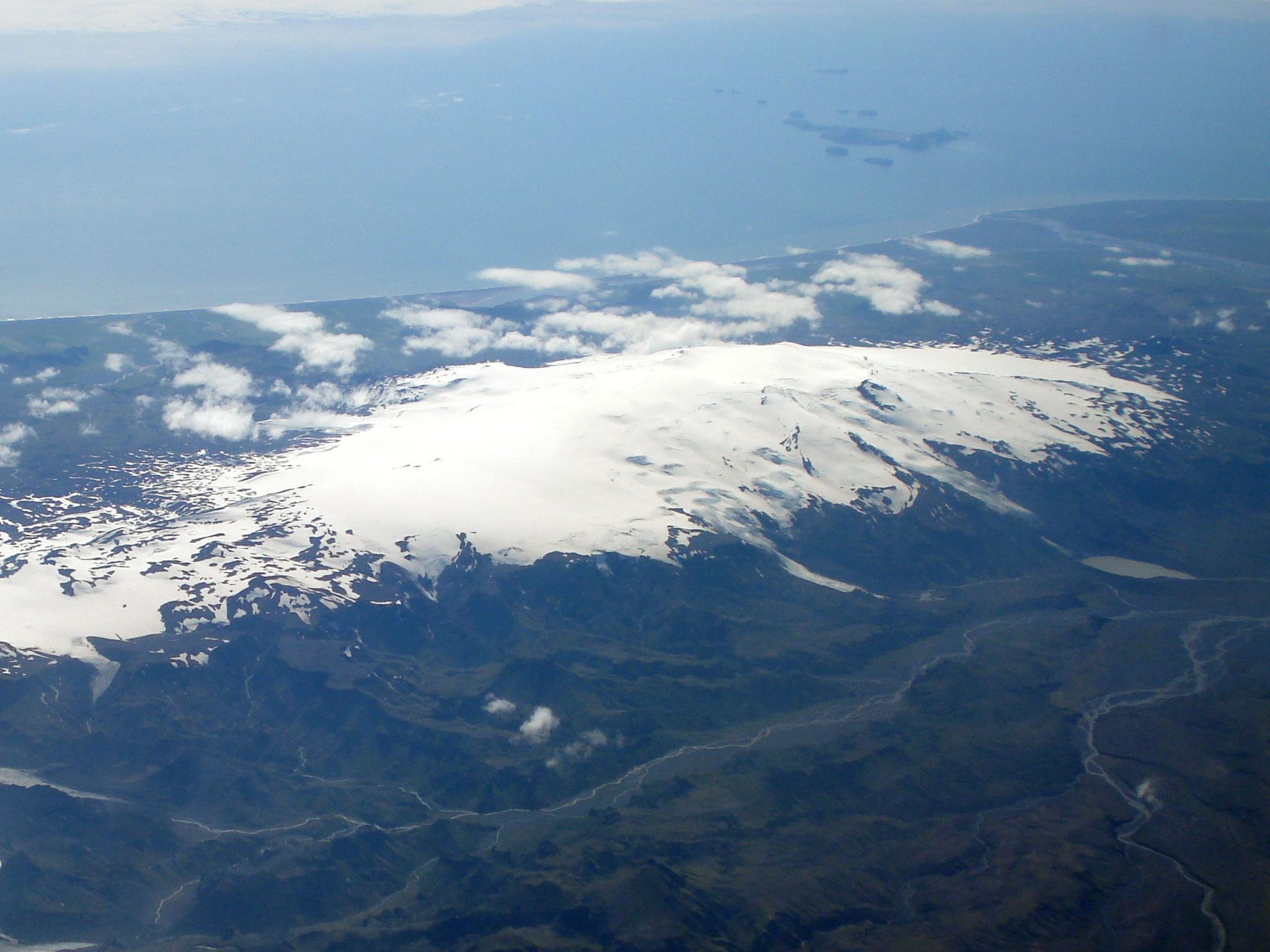
- Aerial view of Eyjafjallajökull from the north-east
- Type: Ice cap
- Location: Southwestern Iceland
- Area: 66 km^{2} (25 sq mi)
- Thickness: 200 m (660 ft)
- Highest elevation: 1,666 metres (5,466 ft)
- Status: Retreating
- Map of Eyjafjallajökull glacier showing its named glacial catchments (light grey shading). Clicking on the map to enlarge it enables mouse over that allows identification of individual named glacial catchments in Iceland.

Eyjafjallajökull
- Guðnasteinn; Hámundur
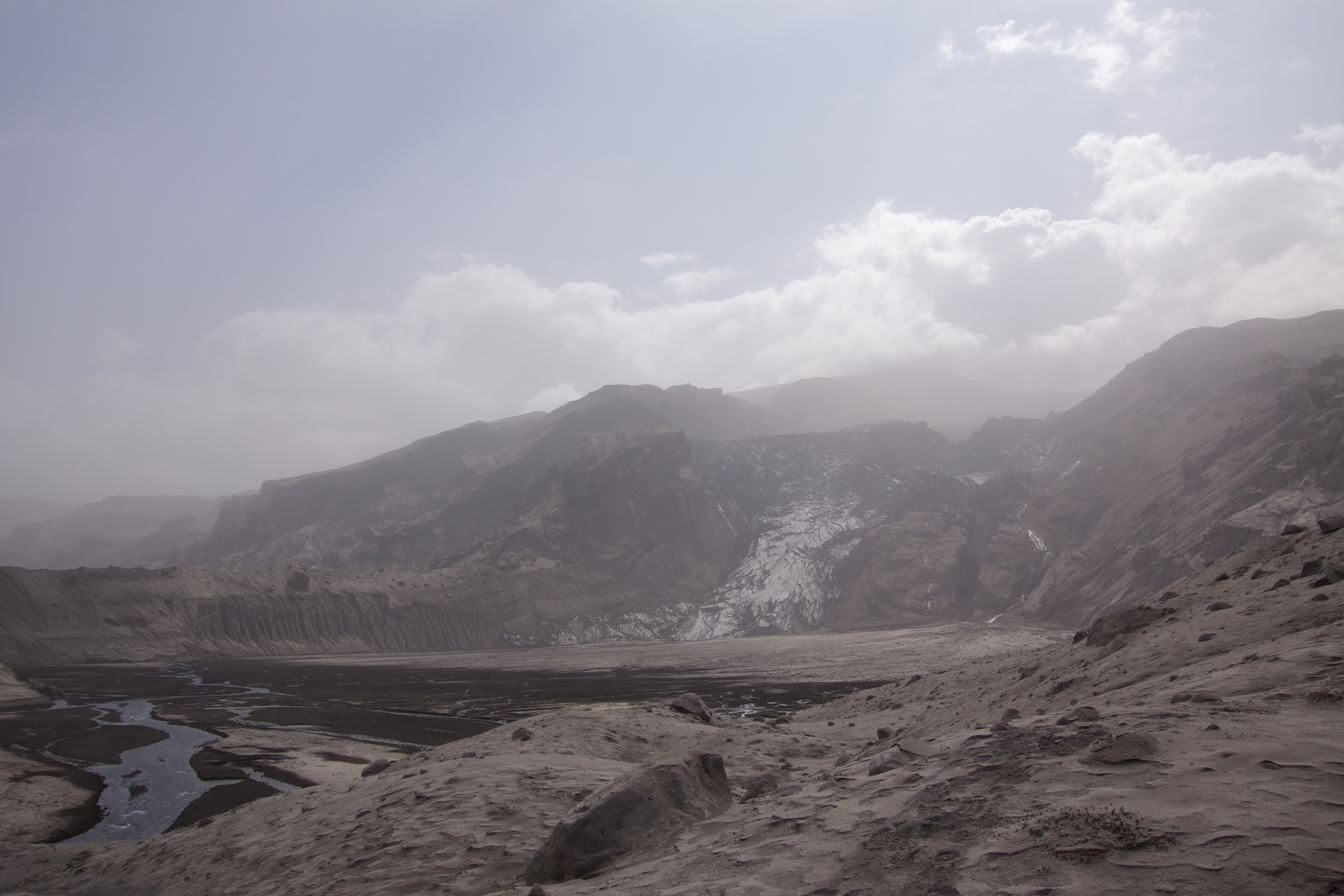
- Gígjökull, Eyjafjallajökull's largest outlet glacier, covered in volcanic ash

Highest point
- Elevation: Mountain: 1,651 m (5,417 ft) (without ice cap)
- Coordinates: 63°37′12″N 19°36′48″W

Geography
- Location within Iceland
- Selected geological features near the Eyjafjallajökull central volcano (red outline). Legend: Other shading shows: calderas; central volcanoes; fissure swarms; subglacial terrain above 1,100 m (3,600 ft); seismically active areas; Clicking on the rectangle in the image enlarges to full window and enables mouse-over with more detail.
- Location: Suðurland, Iceland
- Parent range: N/A

Geology
- Mountain type: Stratovolcano
- Volcanic zone: East Volcanic Zone
- Last eruption: March to June 2010

Eyjafjallajökull (Icelandic: [ˈeiːjaˌfjatl̥aˌjœːkʏtl̥]; "glacier of (the mountain) Eyjafjöll"), sometimes referred to by the numeronym E15, is one of the smaller ice caps of Iceland, north of Skógar and west of Mýrdalsjökull. The ice cap covers the caldera of a volcano with a summit elevation of 1,651 metres (5,417 ft). The volcano has erupted relatively frequently since the Last Glacial Period, most recently in 2010, when, although relatively small for a volcanic eruption, it caused enormous disruption to air travel across northern and western Europe for a week.

== Geography ==
Eyjafjallajökull consists of a volcano completely covered by an ice cap. The retreating ice cap covered an area of 66 km^{2} (25 sq mi) in 2019, but was previously more than 80 square kilometres (30 square miles), with many outlet glaciers. The main outlet glaciers are to the north: Gígjökull, flowing into Lónið, and Steinsholtsjökull, flowing into Steinsholtslón. In 1967, there was a massive landslide on the Steinsholtsjökull glacial tongue. On 16 January 1967 at 13:47:55 there was an explosion on the glacier. It can be timed because the seismometers at Kirkjubæjarklaustur monitored the movement. When about 15,000,000 cubic metres (530,000,000 cubic feet) of material hit the glacier a massive amount of air, ice, and water began to move out from under the glacier into the lagoon at the foot of the glacier.

The mountain itself, a stratovolcano, stands 1,651 metres (5,417 ft) at its highest point, and has a crater three to four kilometres (2 to 2 1/2 miles) in diameter, open to the north. The crater rim has three main peaks (clockwise from the north-east): Goðasteinn ([ˈkvʏðnaˌsteitn̥]), 1,500 m (4,900 ft); Hámundur ([ˈhauːˌmʏntʏr̥]), 1,651 m (5,417 ft); and Goðasteinn ([ˈkɔːðaˌsteitn̥]), 1,497 m (4,911 ft). The south face of the mountain was once part of Iceland's coastline, from which, over thousands of years, the sea has retreated some 5 km (3 mi). The former coastline now consists of sheer cliffs with many waterfalls, of which the best known is Skógafoss. In strong winds, the water of the smaller falls can even be blown up the mountain. The area between the mountain and the present coast is a relatively flat strand, 2–5 km (1–3 mi) wide.

== Etymology ==
The name means "glacier of Eyjafjöll" (or more properly here "ice cap"). Eyjafjöll is the name of the southern side of the volcanic massif together with the small mountains which form the foot of the volcano. The word jökull [ˈjœːkʏtl̥], meaning glacier or ice cap, is a cognate with the Middle English word ikil surviving in the -icle of English icicle.

The name Eyjafjöll is made up of the words eyja [ˈeiːja] (genitive plural of ey, meaning eyot or island), and the plural word fjöll [ˈfjœtl̥], meaning fells or mountains, and together literally means: "the mountains of the islands". The name probably refers to the close by archipelago of Vestmannaeyjar.

The word fjalla [ˈfjatla] is the genitive plural of fjöll, and so Eyjafjalla [ˈeiːjaˌfjatla] is the genitive form of Eyjafjöll and means: "of the Eyjafjöll". A literal part-by-part translation of Eyjafjallajökull would thus be "Islands' Mountains' glacier".

Hence the southern slopes of the mountain Eyjafjöll result in the sea side strip of land beyond being called Undir Eyjafjöllum.

== Geology ==
The stratovolcano, whose vents follow an east–west trend, is composed of basalt to andesite lavas. Most of its historical eruptions have been explosive. However, fissure vents occur on both (mainly the west) sides of the volcano. The volcano is 800,000 years old.

The volcano is fed by a magma chamber under the mountain, which in turn derives from the tectonic divergence of the Mid-Atlantic Ridge. It is part of a chain of volcanoes stretching across Iceland. Its nnearest active neighbours are Katla, to the northeast, and Eldfell, on Heimaey, to the southwest. The volcano is thought to be related to Katla geologically, in that eruptions of Eyjafjallajökull have generally been followed by eruptions of Katla.

Eyjafjallajökull erupted in the years 920, 1612, 1821, and 2010. The Skerin Ridge eruption in 920 was a VEI 3 radial fissure eruption while the subsequent 1612 and 1821 eruptions were VEI 2 small summit eruptions. In the case of the 1821 eruption, a short explosive phase in December 1821 was followed by a year of intermittent explosive to effusive activity.

=== 1821 to 1823 eruptions ===
Some damage was caused by a minor eruption in 1821. Notably, the ash released from the eruption contained a large fraction of fluoride, which in high doses may damage the bone structure of cattle, horses, sheep and humans. The eruption also caused some small and medium glacier runs (jökulhlaups) and flooding in nearby rivers Markarfljót and Hólsá [ˈhɔl̥(t)sˌauː]. The eruptive phase started on 19 and 20 December 1821 by a series of explosive eruptions and continued over the next several days. The sources describe heavy ash fall in the area around the volcano, especially to the south and west.

After that event the sequence of eruptions continued on a more subdued level until June 1822.

From the end of June until the beginning of August 1822, another sequence of explosive eruptions followed. The eruption columns were shot to considerable heights, with ashfall in both the far north of the country, in Eyjafjörður, and in the southwest, on the peninsula of Seltjarnarnes near Reykjavík.

The period from August to December 1822 seemed quieter, but farmers attributed the death of cattle and sheep in the Eyjafjörður area to poisoning from this eruption, which modern analysis identifies as fluoride poisoning. Some small glacier runs occurred in the river Hólsá. A bigger one flooded the plains near the river Markarfljót. (The sources do not indicate the exact date.).

In 1823, some men went hiking up on Eyjafjallajökull to inspect the craters. They discovered a fissure vent near the summit caldera a bit to the west of Guðnasteinn.

In early 1823, the nearby volcano Katla under the Mýrdalsjökull ice cap erupted and at the same time steam columns were seen on the summit of Eyjafjallajökull.

The ash of Eyjafjallajökull's 1821 eruptions is to be found all over the south of Iceland. It is dark grey in colour, small-grained and dacitic intermediate rock containing about 28–40% silicon dioxide.

=== 2010 eruptions ===
On 26 February 2010, unusual seismic activity along with rapid expansion of the Earth's crust was registered by the Icelandic Meteorological Office. This gave geophysicists evidence that magma was pouring from underneath the crust into the magma chamber of the Eyjafjallajökull volcano and that pressure stemming from the process caused the huge crustal displacement at Þorvaldseyri [ˈθɔrval(t)sˌeiːrɪ] farm. In March 2010, almost three thousand small earthquakes were detected near the volcano, all having a depth of 7–10 kilometres (4 1/2–6 miles). The seismic activity continued to increase and from 3–5 March, over a thousand earthquakes were measured at the epicenter of the volcano.

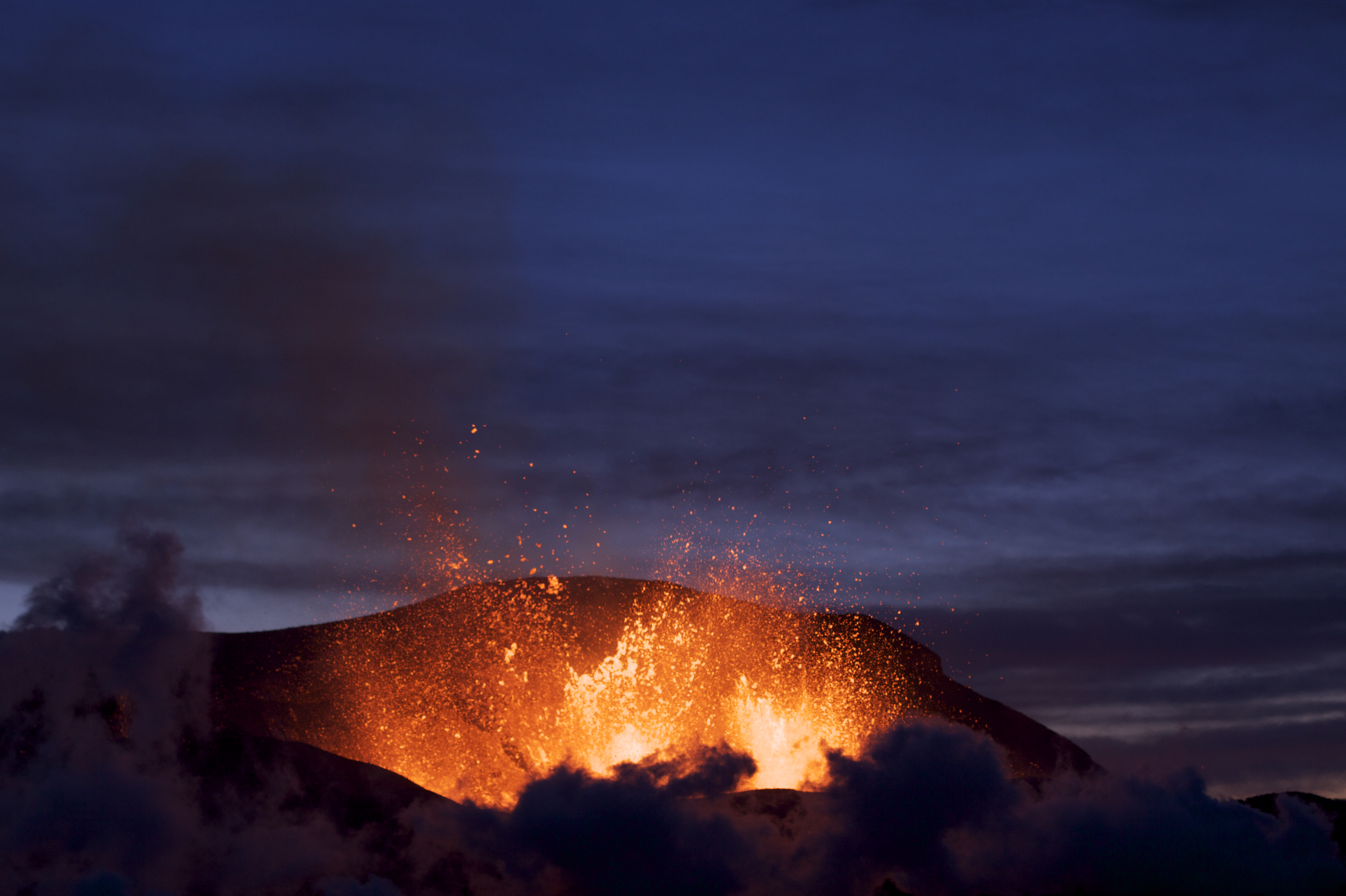
The eruption on 27 March 2010

The eruption begun on 20 March 2010, about 8 km (5 mi) east of the top crater of the volcano, on Fimmvörðuháls, the high neck between Eyjafjallajökull and the neighbouring icecap, Mýrdalsjökull. This first eruption, in the form of a 300-meter-long radial fissure vent, did not occur under the glacier and was smaller in scale than had been expected by some geologists. The eruption consisted of 15 lava fountains reaching heights of up to 185 m (607 ft). The fissure opened on the north side of Fimmvörðuháls, directly across the popular hiking trail between Skógar, south of the pass, and Þórsmörk, immediately to the north.

On 14 April 2010 Eyjafjallajökull resumed erupting after a brief pause, this time from the top crater in the centre of the glacier, causing jökulhlaup (meltwater floods) to rush down the nearby rivers, and requiring 800 people to be evacuated. This eruption was explosive, due to meltwater getting into the volcanic vent. It was estimated to be ten to twenty times larger than the previous one in Fimmvörðuháls. Pulsating explosive activity on 17 April 2010 was later understood to be due to periodic clogging/plugging of the conduit associated with the rise and degassing of more magma. This second eruption threw volcanic ash several kilometres up in the atmosphere, which led to air travel disruption in northwest Europe for six days from 15 to 21 April 2010. This disruption affected over 20 countries and as many as 10 million air travelers. The volcano erupted again in May 2010, causing the closure of airspace over many parts of Europe. The eruptions also created electrical storms. The London Volcanic Ash Advisory Centre declared the eruption to have stopped on the 23rd of May 2010, but stated that they were continuing to monitor the volcano. As a direct result of this disruption being viewed by some as excessive, new standards for the closure of airspace as a result of air contamination by dust/ash were agreed internationally. The volcano continued to have several earthquakes daily, with volcanologists watching the volcano closely. As of August 2010, Eyjafjallajökull was considered dormant. Infrasound sensors have been installed around Eyjafjallajökull to monitor for future eruptions.

In total, the 2010 eruptions generated about 0.27 cubic km (270,000,000 cubic metres) of tephra, causing ash fallout over central southern Iceland and parts of continental Europe. Nearby areas saw an ash layer of up to several centimeters, and surrounding glaciers saw a significant albedo reduction due to the ash.

=== Relationship to Katla ===
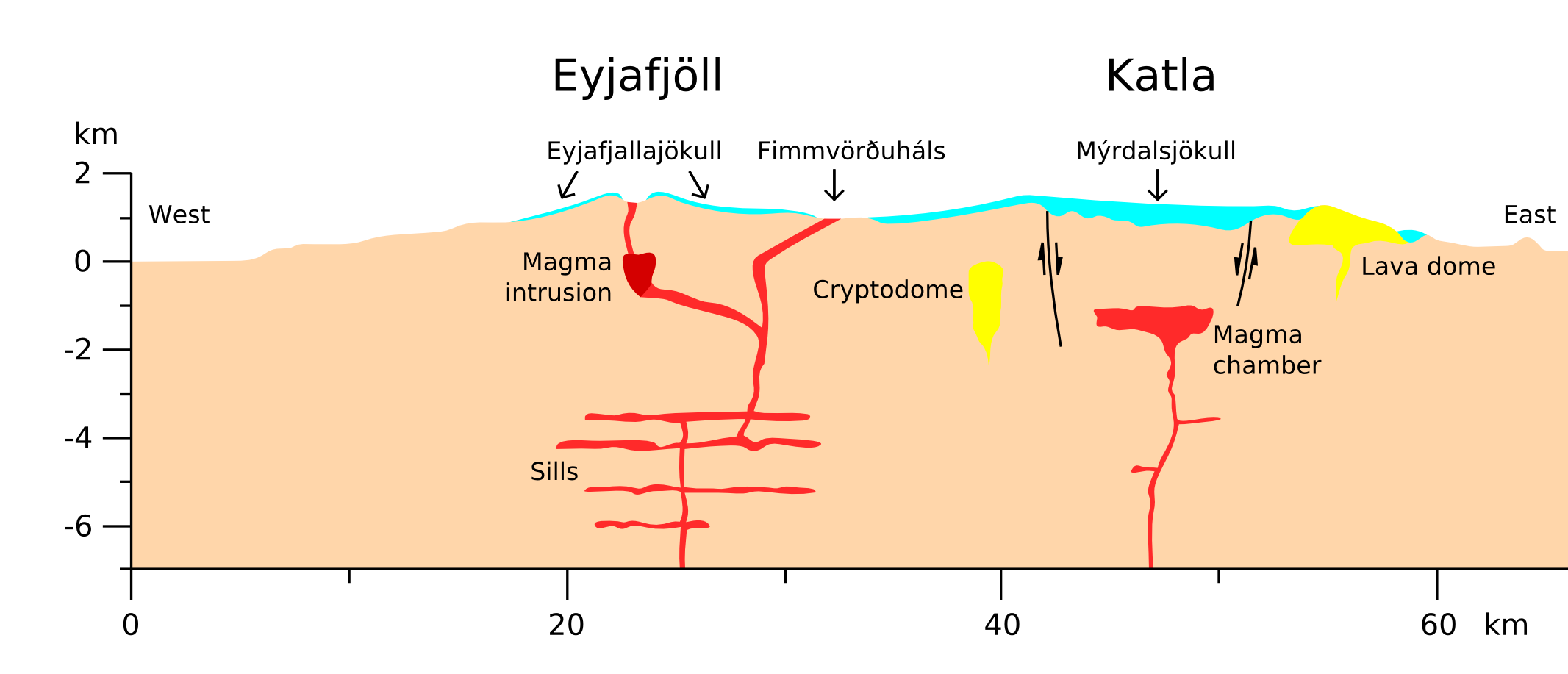
Cross section through Eyjafjöll and Katla

Eyjafjallajökull lies 25 km (15 1/2 mi) west of another subglacial volcano, Katla, under the Mýrdalsjökull ice cap, which is much more active and known for its powerful subglacial eruptions and its large magma chamber. Each of the eruptions of Eyjafjallajökull in 920, 1612, and 1821–1823 has preceded an eruption of Katla. Katla did not display any unusual activity (such as expansion of the crust or seismic activity) during the 2010 eruptions of Eyjafjallajökull, though geologists have been concerned about the general instability of Katla since 1999. Some geophysicists in Iceland believe that the Eyjafjallajökull eruption may trigger an eruption of Katla, which would cause major flooding due to melting of glacial ice and send up massive plumes of ash. On 20 April 2010, Icelandic President Ólafur Grímsson said "the time for Katla to erupt is coming close...we [Iceland] have prepared...it is high time for European governments and airline authorities all over the world to start planning for the eventual Katla eruption".

Volcanologists continue to monitor Katla, aware that any eruption from Katla following an eruption from Eyjafjallajökull has historically occurred within months of an Eyjafjallajökull eruption. The Icelandic Meteorological Office updates its website with reports of quakes at both Eyjafjallajökull and Katla. On 8 July 2011 there was a jökulhlaup that destroyed a bridge on the Ring Road and caused cracks to appear on Katla's glacier.

== Postage stamp ==
Icelandic Post issued three special stamps in 2010 for the eruption of the Eyjafjallajökull volcano. All stamps contain real volcanic ash which fell on 17 April 2010.

== Gallery ==
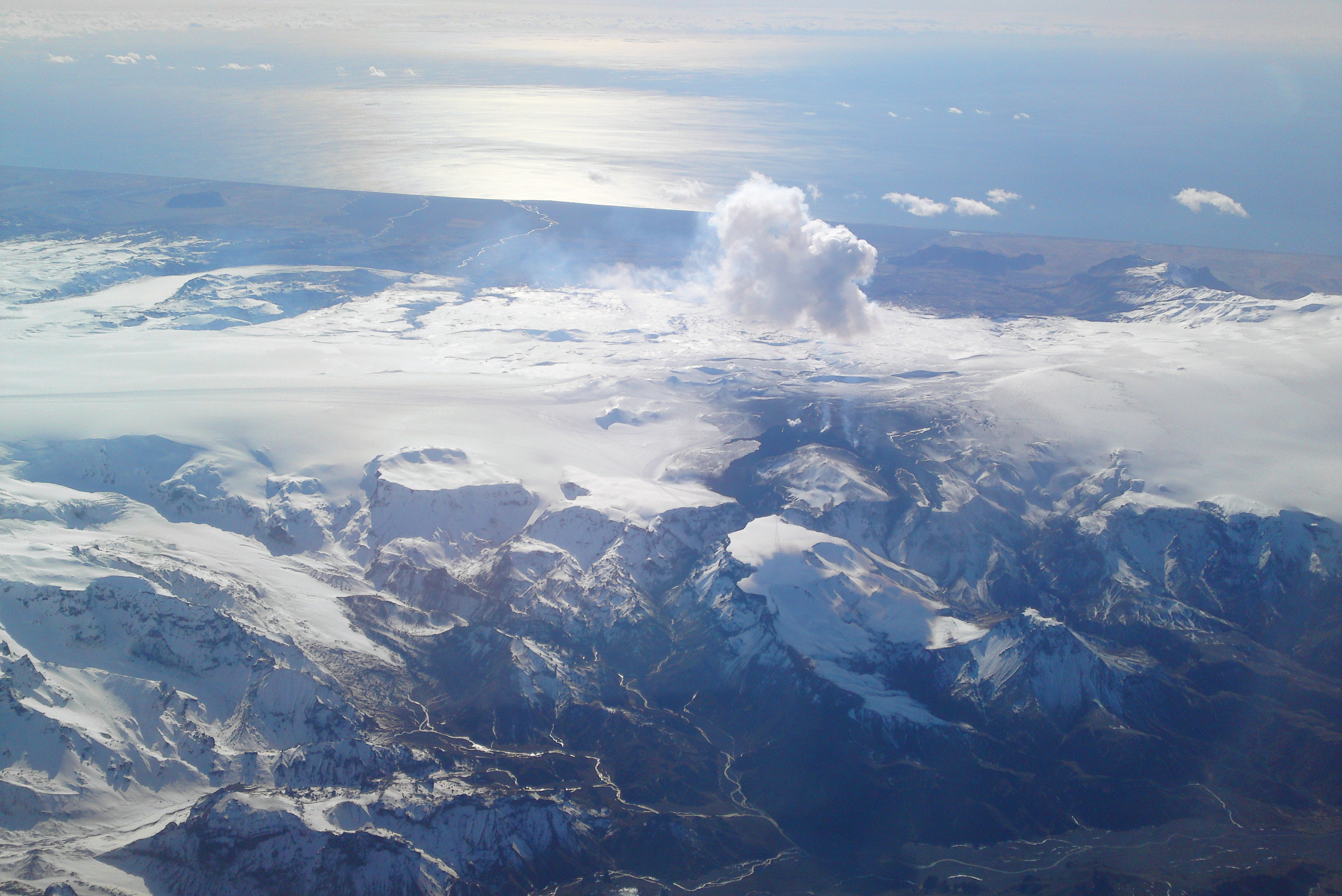
North view of (from left to right) Mýrdalsjökull, Fimmvörðuháls and Eyjafjallajökull on 4 April 2010, taken from an altitude of 10,000 metres (32,800 ft)

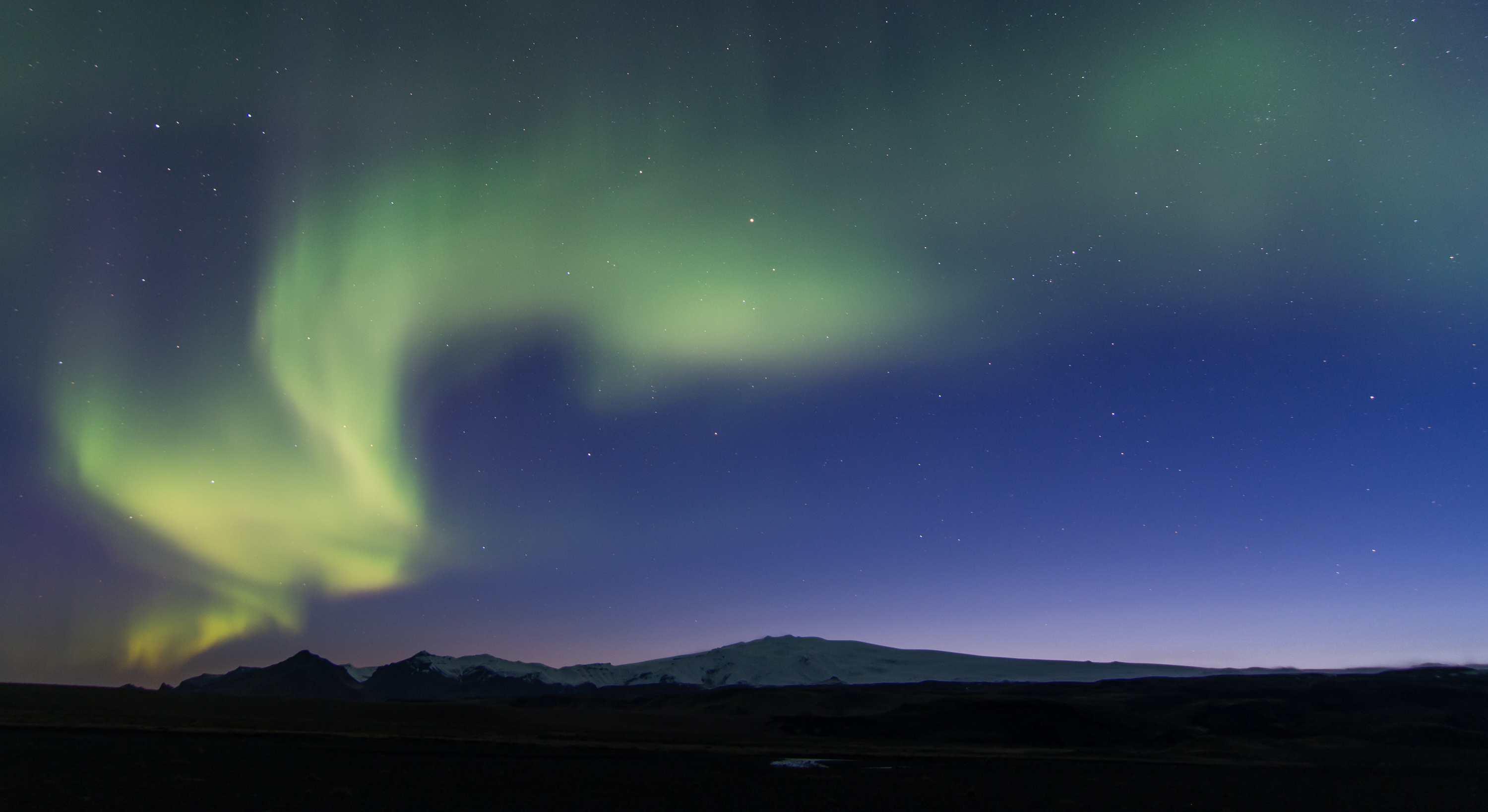
Eyjafjallajökull and the aurora.

Active volcanic areas and systems in Iceland

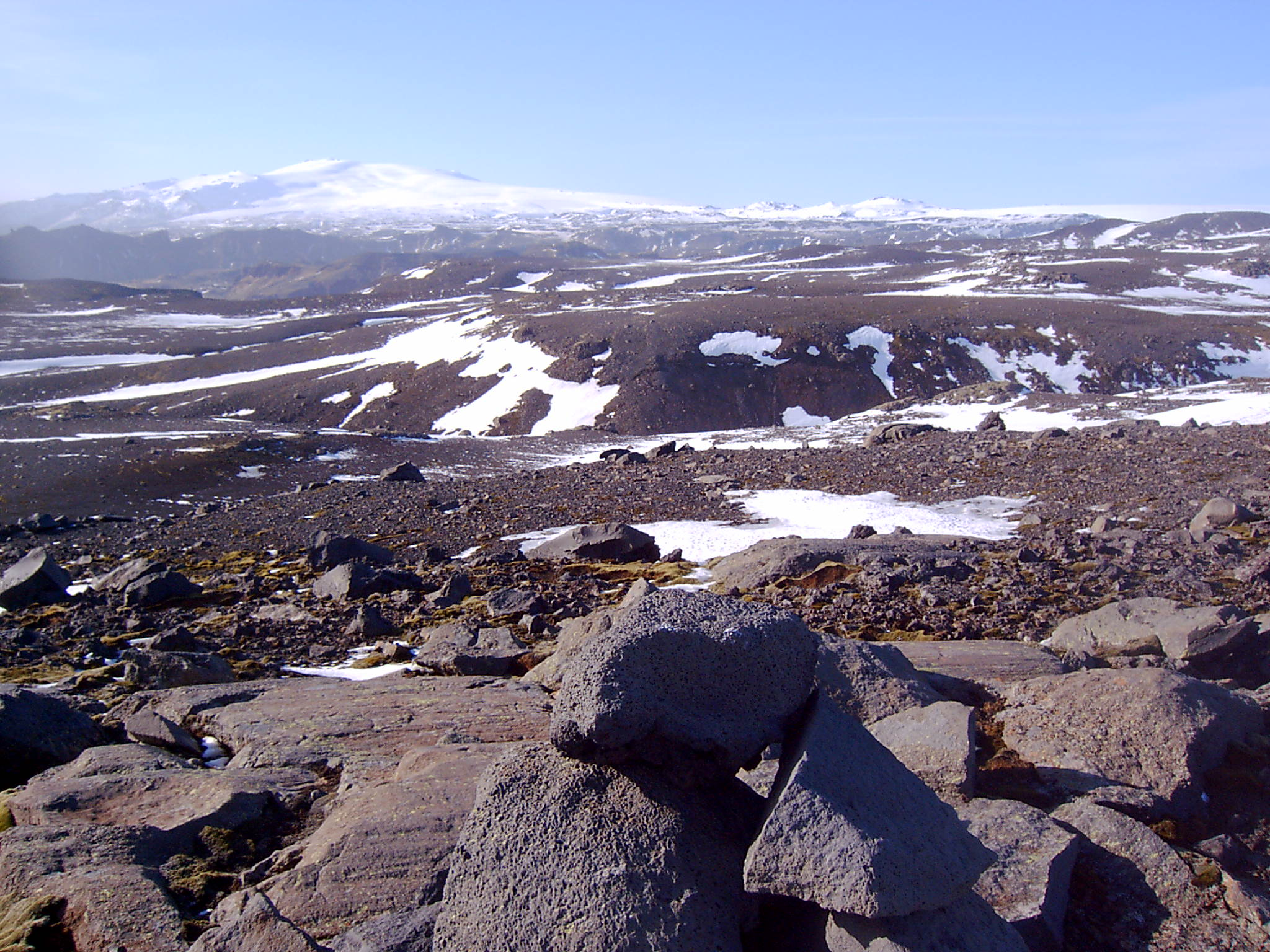
Eyjafjallajökull in March 2006, viewed from a recreation area on the Sólheimajökull, a glacier on the Katla volcano

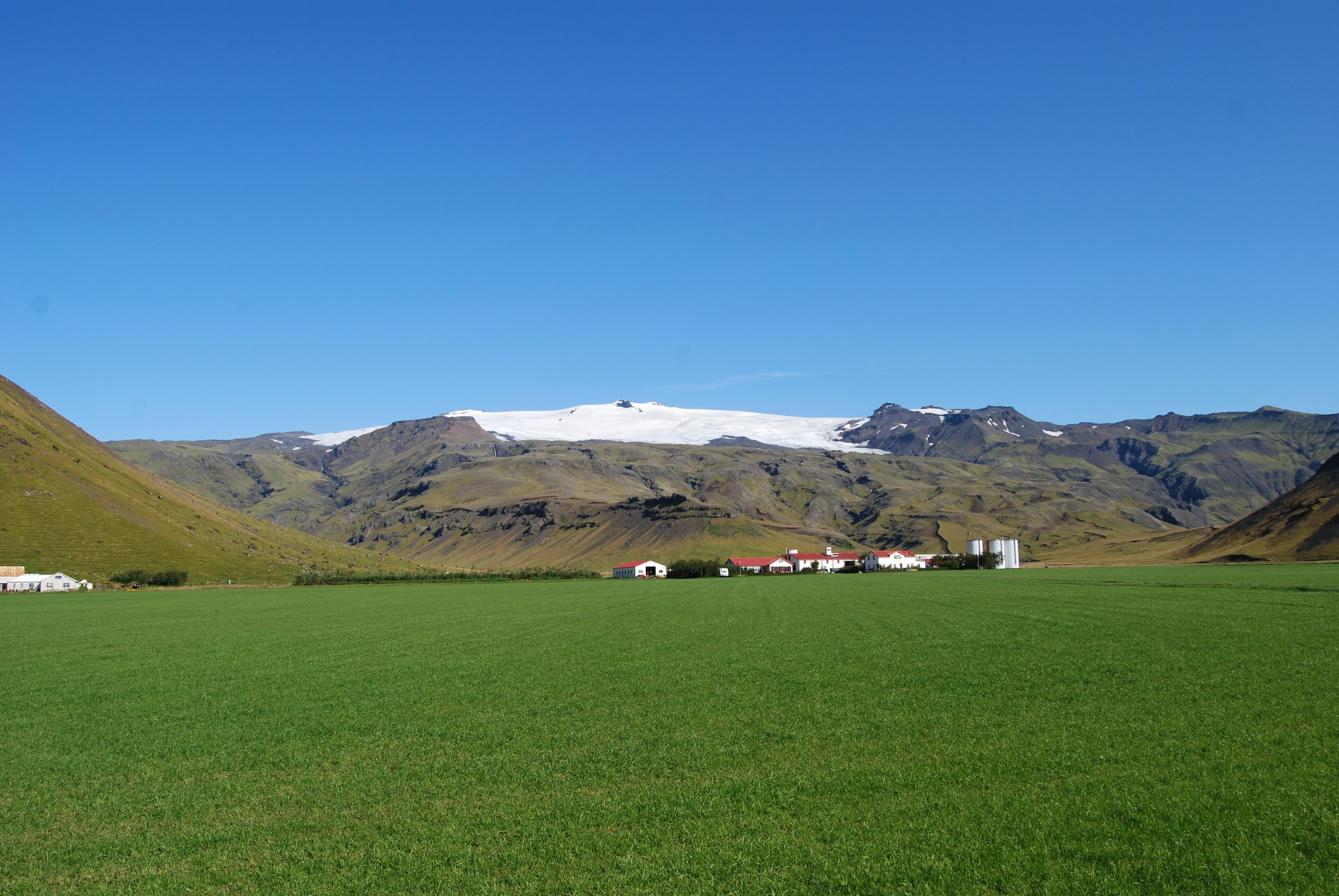
Eyjafjallajökull taken from Route 1 in August 2009

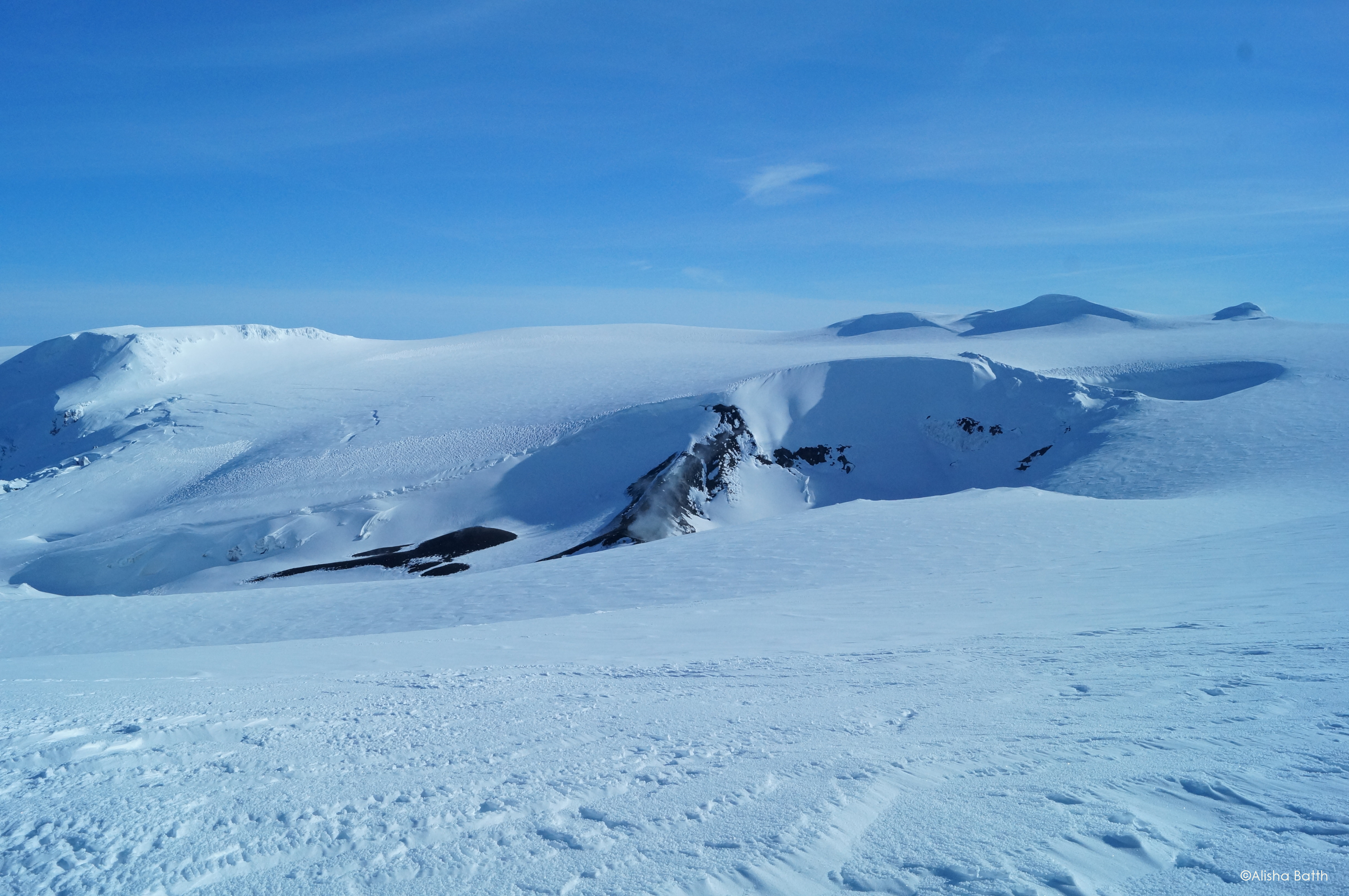
The crater three years post eruption in March 2013

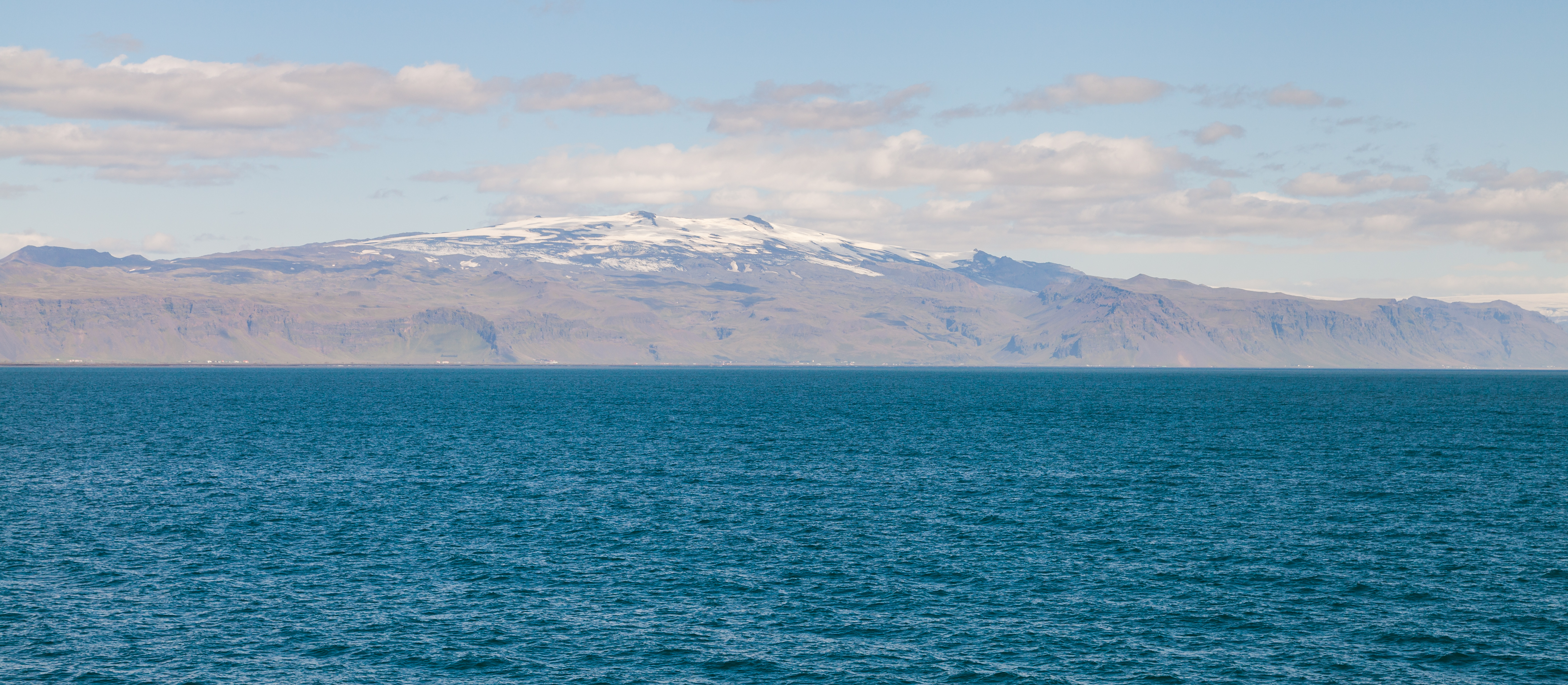
Eyjafjallajökull seen from the sea in summer 2014.

== See also ==
- List of glaciers of Iceland
- List of waterfalls of Iceland
- Ragnar Th. Sigurdsson, who photographed the 2010 eruption
- Volcanism of Iceland
  - List of volcanic eruptions in Iceland
  - List of volcanoes in Iceland
- 2010 eruptions of Eyjafjallajökull
