= Ash Ingestion Detection for Aircraft =

Ash Ingestion Detection for Aircraft (AIDA) is an EU FP7 project set up by a consortium of partners: Greenbank Group UK, Intelligent Systems Research Institute (ISRI), Innora, WLB, Lenis Global, AeroCARE and AeroSTAR aiming to prevent aircraft ingestion of volcanic ash. The project delivers an advanced airborne volcanic ash detection prototype which uses bespoke machine vision interrogation of volcanic ash and an intelligent image analysis algorithm to classify the a cluster of debris into ash and not ash.

The prototype is designed to be retrofitted to an aircraft where it examines the air in the aircraft's ventilation or air-conditioning ducts. By interrogating foreign bodies using birefringence an initial classification of "ash" and "not ash" can be determined. The system then feeds the counted particles through a trigger system which calculates the size and speed of the particles triggering a high resolution camera. The images collected are interrogated using surface feature recognition to verify the presence of volcanic ash by finding known surface features.

The presence of ash is counted and gives an early warning to the pilot, ground crews and Airline maintenance team to potentially avoid catastrophic failure of aircraft parts. Tests completed displayed the clear differences that can be seen between non-uniform silicates (such as sand and ash) and more uniform particles. Long term testing indicated that system cleaning would be required regularly for high loads of particulates but this is expected to occur naturally over the course of a flight.

Assessment of the prototype classification algorithm was completed with a subset of the collected results using manual particle segmentation. To fully automate the process development would be required. Results from the tests performed in laboratory conditions showed a 100% accuracy of classifying ash as ‘ash’ and a 95% accuracy of classifying sand as ‘not ash’ which is a very promising outcome.

These results indicate that particle classification is extremely successful, especially taking into account the fact that the error is distributed towards false positives rather than false negatives; the classifier does not miss volcanic ash particles which is a crucial condition to ensure safety, since misclassifying volcanic ash particles as harmless can prove much more costly than misclassifying sand particles as harmful.

== See also ==
- British Airways Flight 9, aircraft incident after ingesting volcanic ash
- KLM Flight 867, aircraft incident after ingesting volcanic ash
