= Air travel disruption after the 2010 Eyjafjallajökull eruption =

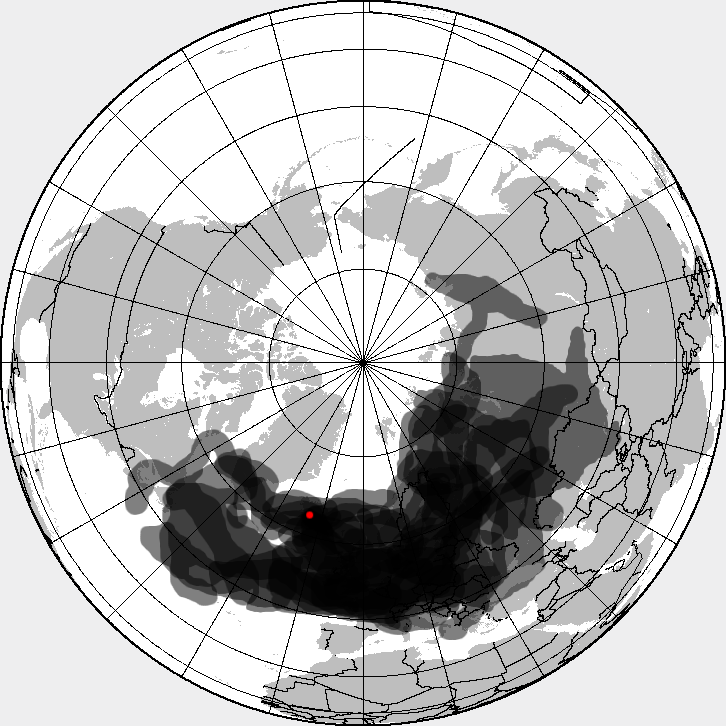
Composite map of the volcanic ash cloud (with Eyjafjallajökull volcano in red) spanning 14–25 April 2010, based on data by the London Volcanic Ash Advisory Centre's website (Met Office, UK).

In response to concerns that volcanic ash ejected during the 2010 eruptions of Eyjafjallajökull in Iceland would damage aircraft engines, the controlled airspace of many European countries was closed to instrument flight rules traffic, resulting in what at the time was the largest air-traffic shut-down since World War II. The closures caused millions of passengers to be stranded not only in Europe, but across the world. With large parts of European airspace closed to air traffic, many more countries were affected as flights to, from, and over Europe were cancelled.

An eruption on 14 April led to an initial uninterrupted shutdown over much of northern Europe from 15 to 23 April. Afterwards, airspace was closed intermittently in different parts of Europe in the following weeks, as the path of the ash cloud was tracked. The ash cloud caused further disruptions to air travel operations in Scotland and Ireland on 4 and 5 May and in Spain, Portugal, northern Italy, Austria, and southern Germany on 9 May. Irish and UK airspace closed again on 16 May and reopened on 17 May.

The eruption occurred beneath glacial ice. The cold water from the melting ice chilled the lava quickly, causing it to fragment into very small particles of glass (silica) and ash, which were carried into the eruption plume. The extremely fine ash particles and the large volume of steam from the glacial meltwater sent an ash plume hazardous to aircraft rapidly high into the upper atmosphere. The presence and location of the plume depended upon the state of the eruption and the winds. The large amount of glacial meltwater flowing into the eruption vent made this eruption so explosive that it ejected its ash plume directly into the jet stream, which was unusually stable and south-easterly. The ash was then carried over Europe into some of the busiest airspace in the world.

The International Air Transport Association (IATA) estimated that the airline industry worldwide would lose €148 million (US$200 million, £130 million) a day during the disruption. IATA stated that the total loss for the airline industry was around €1.3 billion (£1.1 billion, US$1.7 billion). The Airport Operators Association (AOA) estimated that airports lost £80 million over the six and a half days. Over 95,000 flights had been cancelled all across Europe during the six-day airspace ban, with later figures suggesting 107,000 flights cancelled during an 8-day period, accounting for 48% of total air traffic and roughly 10 million passengers.

== Background ==
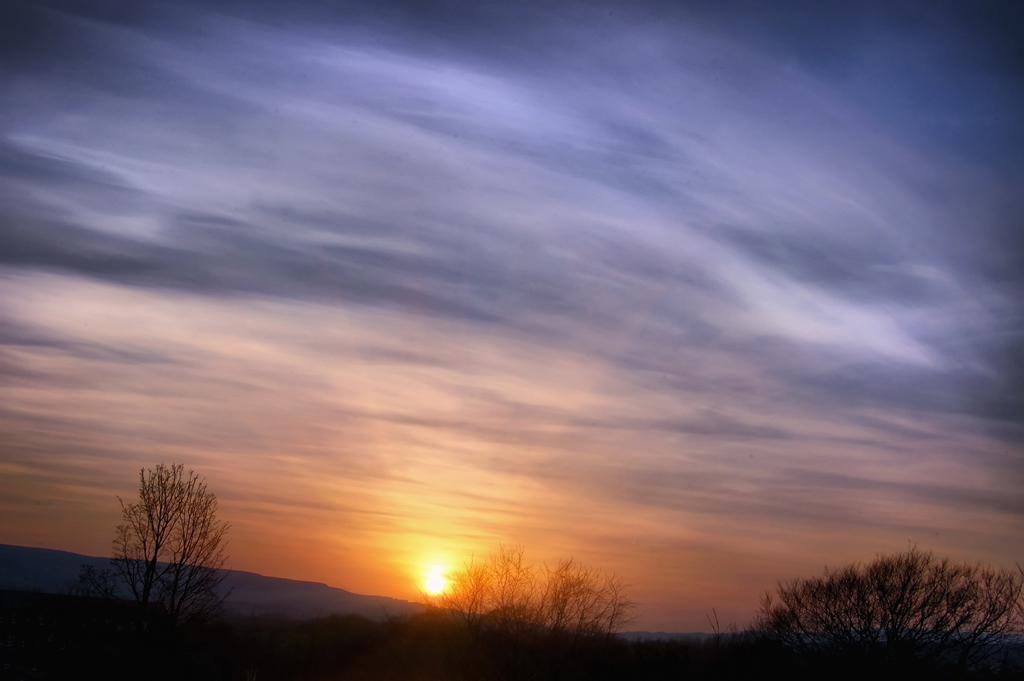
Dust particles suspended in the atmosphere scatter light from the setting sun, generating 'volcanic lavenders' like this one over the flight path of Leeds Bradford Airport in England during the aviation shutdown

The London Volcanic Ash Advisory Centre (VAAC) was responsible for providing information about the ash plume to the relevant civil aviation authorities in the form of Volcanic Ash Advisories (VAA). On the basis of this, the authorities made decisions about when and where airspace should be closed due to the safety issues. Their decisions resulted in the cancellations of flights at airports across the world, not only in those countries where airspace was restricted. On 16 April 2010, 16,000 of Europe's usual 28,000 daily scheduled passenger flights were cancelled and on the following day 16,000 of the usual 22,000 flights were cancelled. By 21 April 95,000 flights had been cancelled.

Before this, the most severe restrictions to air travel in recent times were following the attacks of 11 September 2001 in the United States when all civil air traffic (not just scheduled) in US airspace, and to and from the United States, was grounded for three days.

Professor Bill McGuire of the Aon Benfield UCL Hazard Research Centre said on 15 April that the most notable eruption of the Icelandic volcano Laki (which occurred in 1783,), if it occurred today, would "have the potential to severely affect air travel at high northern latitudes for six months or more". The last time the Eyjafjallajökull volcano erupted, in 1821, it spewed ash for over a year. Geophysicists in Iceland said that the production of ash from Eyjafjallajökull was likely to continue at a comparable level for some days or even weeks; a geophysicist at the Icelandic Meteorological Office said, "Where it disrupts travel depends on the weather. It depends how the wind carries the ash".

== Jet engine tolerance to airborne particles ==
In 1982, British Airways Flight 9 flew through volcanic ash of Mount Galunggung, Java, Indonesia, causing all 4 engines to shut down. However, the crew restarted all but one of the engines and landed safely. Subsequently, there was an addition to the operations manuals, describing how to deal with volcanic ash.

In 1989, KLM Flight 867 was on its approach into Anchorage, Alaska when the Boeing 747-400 flew through volcanic ash from Mount Redoubt causing all 4 engines to shut down. The crew were able to restart both engines on the left wing and landed safely in Ted Stevens International Airport.

Iceland's authorities had been warning airlines for several years, asking them to determine the density of ash that is safe for their jet engines. However, prior to the volcanic events of April 2010, aircraft engine manufacturers still had not defined specific particle levels above which engines were considered to be at risk. The general approach taken by airspace regulators was that if the ash concentration rose above zero, then the airspace was considered unsafe and was consequently closed.

The April eruption of Eyjafjallajökull caused enough economic difficulties that aircraft manufacturers were forced to define specific limits on how much ash is considered acceptable for a jet engine to ingest without damage. On 21 April, the UK's Civil Aviation Authority (CAA) in conjunction with engine manufacturers, set new guidelines which allowed aircraft to fly when there are levels of volcanic ash between 200 and 2000 micrograms (2 milligrams) of ash per cubic metre. These levels were declared by governments, aircraft manufacturers, and airlines not to have safety implications if appropriate maintenance and ash inspection procedures were followed.

From noon 18 May, the UK CAA further revised the safe limit upwards to 4 milligrams per cubic metre of air space. Any airspace in which the ash density exceeds this limit is categorised as prohibited airspace.

To minimise the level of further disruption that this and other volcanic eruptions could cause, the UK CAA announced the creation of a new category of restricted airspace called a Time Limited Zone (TLZ). Airspace categorised as TLZ is similar to airspace experiencing severe weather in that the restrictions are expected to be of a short duration; however, the key difference with TLZ airspace is that airlines must produce certificates of compliance in order for their aircraft to enter these areas. Flybe was the first airline to conform to these regulations and their aircraft will be permitted to enter airspace in which the ash density is between 2 mg and 4 mg per cubic metre.

== Airspace restrictions in Europe ==
External videos
- Flight video; variations of traffic due to ash cloud
- Radar animation

Airspace completely (red) or partially (orange) closed to IFR traffic on 18 April 2010

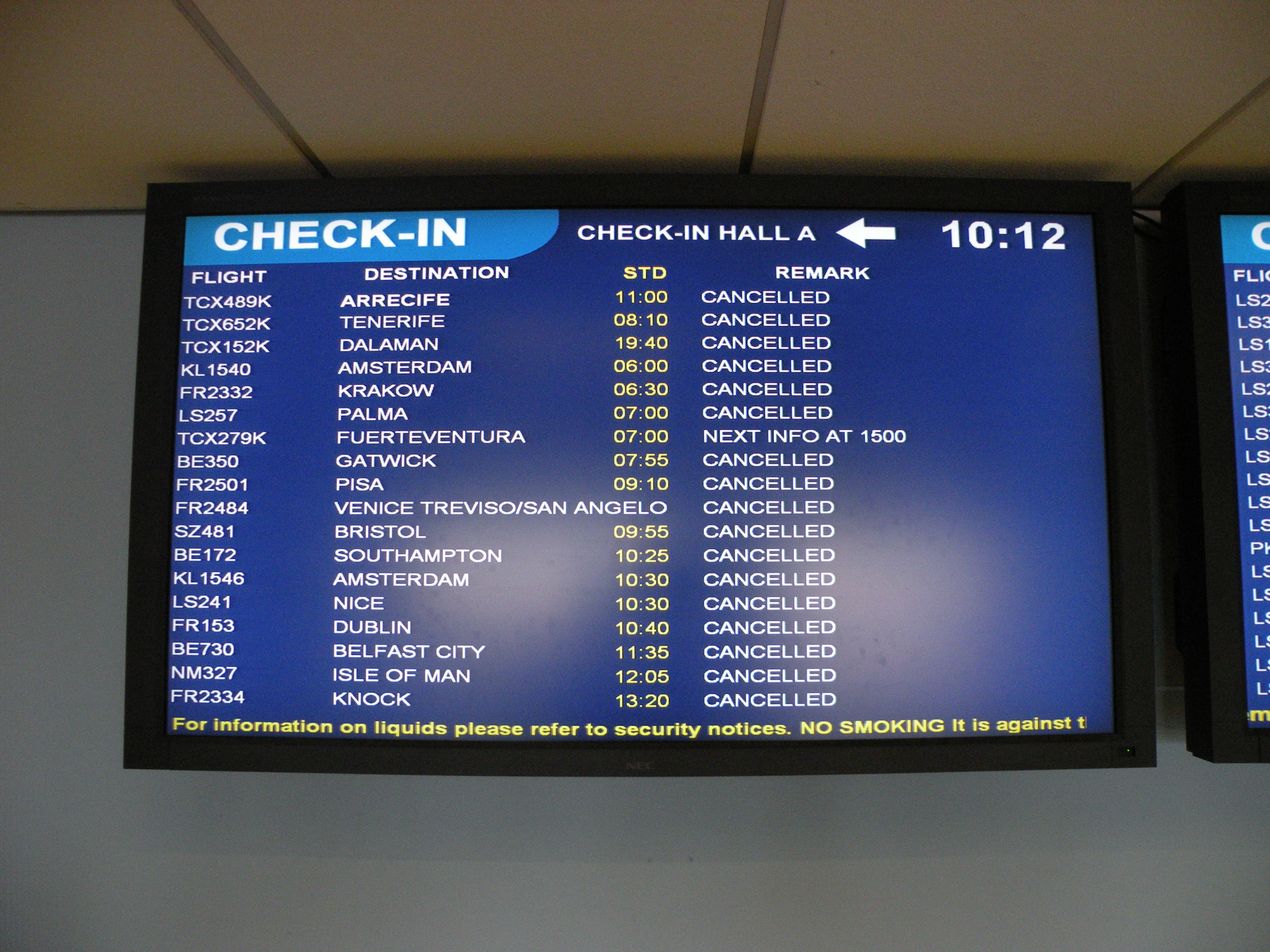
Flight disruptions at Leeds Bradford International Airport during the eruptions.

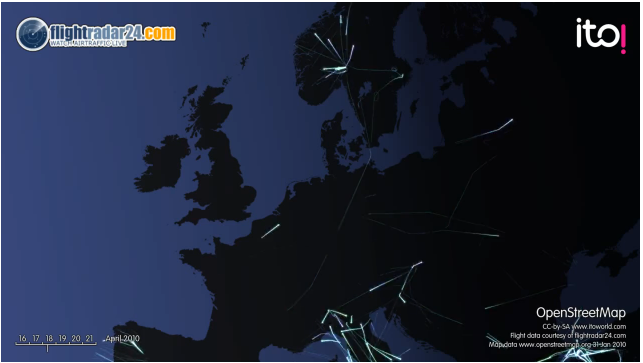
Some flights from Oslo operating and over Italy by the morning of 18 April 2010.

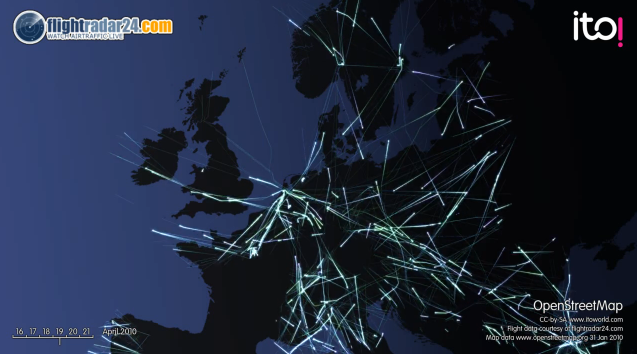
Flights returning to most of mainland Europe on 19 April 2010. Note that no data is available for much of France and some other areas.

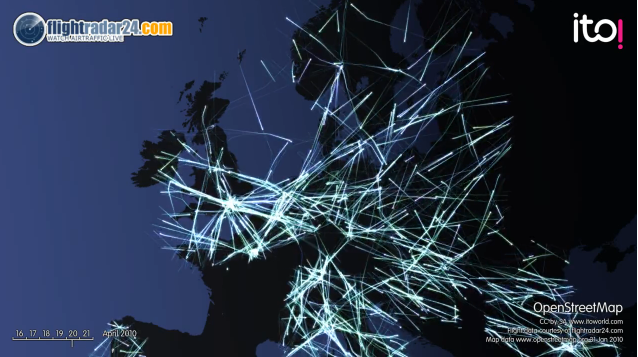
Flights apparently operating to all of Europe on 20 April 2010. No data available for much of France and some other areas.

Under international regulations, all scheduled passenger flights operate under the instrument flight rules (IFR) which requires clearance to be obtained from air traffic control. From 14 April onwards, the controlled airspace was closed in several European countries and no IFR clearances were granted. The airspace of Iceland itself was hardly disrupted in this period (although a change in the wind direction on 23 April caused the main airport to be closed).

By 23 April, the restrictions were lifted over much of Europe through the introduction of new guidelines on volcanic ash density. After this date there were sporadic closures from time to time, notably in the UK, Ireland, and Iceland, but not a blanket shutdown.

Country	Restrictions imposed
Austria	On 16 April, Austro Control ceased air activities at airports in both Vienna and Linz; Salzburg and Innsbruck stopped flights at 20:00 CEST; and Graz and Klagenfurt followed at 23:00 CEST. At 00:30 on 18 April, all Austrian airports were closed until 18:00. The Austria Press Agency reported that permission to resume takeoffs and landings took effect at 05:00 local time (0300 UTC) Monday but that it was unclear whether the airspace would remain open all day.
Belarus	On Saturday 17 April, the airspace over Belarus was closed.
Belgium	Belgium's airspace closed at 16:30 CEST on 15 April. It remained closed until 08:00 CEST on Tuesday 20 April.
Bosnia and Herzegovina	The airspace over Bosnia and Herzegovina was closed to traffic from 08:00 CEST until midnight (00:00 CEST) on 17 April.
Bulgaria	On Sunday 18 April, all Bulgarian airports were closed. However, at 14:00 local time the airports in Sofia and Plovdiv were open.
Croatia	At 02:00 CET on 17 April, the air space over northern Croatia was closed, including Zagreb. At 08:00 CET the airports at Pula, Rijeka, Zadar, and Lošinj were closed.
Denmark	Naviair, the state-owned company controlling Danish airspace, announced that Denmark's airspace would close at 16:00 UTC on 15 April. However, Naviair assessed that it is safe to fly through airspace in high altitude – 35,500 feet (10,800 m). This means that aircraft on a route such as Tokyo to New York can fly over Denmark. Danish airspace was subsequently closed until 02:00 on 21 April.
Estonia	On 15 April Estonian Air flights from Tallinn to Oslo, Copenhagen, and London were cancelled due to airspace closures in Norway, Denmark, and the UK. As the ash cloud spread over Estonia on the night of 16 April, all flights were cancelled due to closure of airspace in Estonia. Estonian airspace was partly opened in the evening of 19 April and completely late evening on 20 April.
Finland	Finland closed its airspace at 00:00 EEST on 16 April, having previously closed northern, western, and central parts of its airspace. On 19 April a gap formed in the ash cloud over Finland, and Finavia lifted flight restrictions at the airports of Helsinki-Vantaa, Turku, and Tampere-Pirkkala in the afternoon. During the five hours that Helsinki-Vantaa airport was open, there were a total of ten flights either arriving or departing. On 20 April the upper airspace was opened at 9,500 metres (31,200 ft) altitude to international overflights above the occurrence of the ash. On 21 April, Helsinki-Vantaa Airport's air traffic control services are open and other airport services, like terminal services, are returning to normal by 12.00 noon. The airport was closed again at 3 pm. On 22 April, Helsinki-Vantaa Airport was opened around 3 pm, and was expected to remain open at least 24 hours.
France	At 23:00 UTC+02 on 15 April 24 airports, including Charles de Gaulle Airport, were closed. On 17 April, the Direction Générale de l'Aviation Civile extended the suspension to 35 airports, including all Paris airports, until 08:00 UTC+2 on Monday 19 April. On 18 April, the closure of the Paris airports was extended to at least 08:00 UTC+2 on Tuesday 20 April.
Germany	On 16 April, all international airports in Germany were closed. The complete airspace was opened again for IFR and VFR at 11:00 CEST on 21 April.
Hungary	Hungary's airspace was closed at 19:00 CEST on 16 April. It remained closed until 10:00 UTC on Monday 19 April.
Iceland	On 22 April, the Keflavik airport, which serves as the main entry point for International flights to Iceland, closed due to ash.
Ireland	On 15 April, the Irish Aviation Authority announced restrictions on flying in Irish airspace until 06:00 IST on Friday 16 April at the earliest Restrictions were lifted on flights to and from Cork, Shannon, and some regional airports by the day's end but restrictions remained at Dublin until 11:00 UTC+1. The government's emergency planning taskforce, which included several government departments, An Garda Síochána, Met Éireann, the Irish Aviation Authority (IAA), and Dublin Airport Authority (DAA), met on the evening of 15 April to discuss the emergency. The taskforce had met at the National Emergency Co-ordinating Centre on five further occasions by the morning of 20 April 2010. On 16 April, Irish air space was reopened for domestic flights from 10:00 IST and westward transatlantic flights resumed from Dublin: Irish flights which were scheduled to fly eastwards over the United Kingdom and continental European airspace remained grounded. On 17 April, the ash spread to most of Ireland, and all airspace was closed until 18:00 UTC+01, and subsequently extended until 18:00 UTC+01 on Monday 19 April. On Monday 19 April, the country's aviation chief warned that Dublin was "damned" and would be shut off to the rest of the world until Friday 23 April. On Tuesday 20 April, it was reported that at least 30,000 Irish people were still stranded abroad, unable to get home. Those who were at home were opting for "staycations", as Irish holidaymakers swapped Barcelona for Ballybunion in a boost for domestic tourism. It had been anticipated that Irish air space would re-open for limited flights from 05:00 UTC+1 on 20 April; however, the volcanic ash cloud made this impossible. It was expected that normal flights will resume from Friday, 23 April, due to the backlog of flights. Shannon Airport opened at 13:00 UTC+1 on 20 April (not for departing commercial flights) but Cork Airport and Dublin Airport remained closed. On 20 April at 21:00 UTC+1 Irish airspace fully re-opened, but air travellers were advised to contact their airline. It was expected that normal flights would resume on Friday 23 April. A statement from the Irish Aviation Authority said "[it] is expected that flights tomorrow [21 April] will focus on positioning aircraft and crews and full service by the airlines may take up to three days to recover. Passengers should consult airline websites before travelling to the airport for flights." On 4 May, Irish airspace closed from 07:00 to 13:00 IST. The IAA said the decision was based on information from the Volcanic Ash Advice Centre (VAAC). The no fly zone affected Dublin, Shannon, Galway, Sligo, Ireland West (Knock), Donegal, Cork, and Kerry. At 13:00 UTC+1 Irish airspace fully re-opened. However further closures and cancellations occurred the next day, on 5 May.
Italy	Ente Nazionale per l'Aviazione Civile closed the airspace over Northern Italy for 17 April, excluding emergency flights and flights flying over 35,000 feet (11,000 m), from 06:00 CEST until 14:00 CEST. The closure was later extended to 08:00 UTC+02 on Monday 19 April. Over 198 flights at the Rome airports were cancelled, 436 at the Milan airports, 104 at Naples, and 43 at Catania.
Kosovo	Kosovo closed its airspace at 00:00 UTC+02 on 18 April, cutting air access to Pristina. It reopened at 14:00 UTC+02 on 18 April.
Latvia	Latvian airspace was closed at 21:00 UTC on 15 April, cutting air access to Riga and other airports of local significance. It is to remain closed until at least 06:00 UTC on 19 April, but would probably remain closed until 22 April.
Luxembourg	Luxembourg Airport was closed for virtually all flights on 16 April and remained closed at least until the evening of 18 April.
Netherlands	Dutch airspace closed at 17:00 UTC on 15 April and remained closed until 20:00 CEST on 19 April. They restarted flights after this time, starting with 4 KLM flights to Dubai, New York, Toronto, and Shanghai.
Norway	Air travel was suspended from 14 April. Airports throughout Nord-Trøndelag, Nordland, Troms, and Finnmark were re-opened at times, as those areas were least affected by the ash: the largest of these, Trondheim, was opened for six hours on 16 April. The total closure of Norwegian airspace included the 21 search and rescue and medical aircraft and helicopters in the country. The health authorities stated that the challenges faced were unprecedented in modern history, and ambulances and medical personnel were moved north and out of cities to decentralise the service and replace the lost aerial transport. The air space caused most of the oil platforms in the North Sea to not be able to fly in new personnel, causing existing crews to have to work until 18 April.
Poland	Poland closed the northern part of its airspace at 18:00 UTC on 15 April. On 16 April its whole airspace was shut down. The disruption affected the funeral for the Polish president Lech Kaczyński, his wife Maria, and the other victims who died in an air crash earlier in April. Family members decided not to postpone the ceremony, resulting in other countries' dignitaries being unable to attend.
Portugal	Portugal's Institute of Meteorology (IM) announced on Tuesday 20 April that the cloud of volcanic ash entered the Portuguese airspace controlled by the Azorean island of Santa Maria, in an area still far from the national territory, and that the affected area was "very small". For the most part, only flights to countries with closed airspaces were cancelled forcing numerous members of the government (including the president) who were away to return to the country by car from the UK, Austria, and Belgium. however several flights to the U.S. and elsewhere were also cancelled because of the unavailability of planes coming from other parts of Europe or carriers that required the planes to stop in their countries, such as Germany or France.
Romania	Romania closed the northwestern part of its airspace at 00:00 local time (UTC+03) on 17 April, including Oradea, Satu Mare, Baia Mare, Cluj-Napoca, Sibiu, and Timișoara airports. The two Bucharest airports were also closed. Romania's entire airspace closed at 18:00 local time (UTC+03) on 17 April until at least 12:00 on 19 April. On 20 April Timișoara, Otopeni, Băneasa, Craiova, Cluj-Napoca, Sibiu, Oradea, Satu Mare, and Baia Mare airports reopened.
Serbia; Montenegro; Bosnia and Herzegovina	Air Traffic Services Agency of Serbia and Montenegro, shut down all traffic over Serbia, Montenegro, part of international waters of the Adriatic Sea, and the upper airspace of Bosnia and Herzegovina that it controls, at 14:00 UTC, 17 April. The airspace was reopened at 22:00 UTC, 18 April.
Slovakia	Slovakia's airspace was closed at 15:00 UTC on 16 April.
Slovenia	The Transport Ministry closed the airspace to the north of the 46th parallel up to 35,500 feet (10,800 m) at 22:00 UTC on 16 April, and over the entire country at 06:00 UTC on 17 April. The closure lasted until 19:10 UTC on 18 April. It was the first closure of Slovenian airspace since the Ten-Day War in 1991. On 03:00 UTC on 20 April, the airspace was closed again up to 20,500 ft (6,200 m). On 07:00 UTC on 21 April, the airspace was opened again without restrictions.
Spain	Aena closed seven airports in northern Spain at 20:00 UTC+1 on 17 April: they were planned to remain closed until 10:00 on 18 April, but one hour later, at 21:00 UTC+1 they started to operate again. At 08:30 UTC+1 on 18 11 April northern airports were closed, including Barcelona, the country's second largest. At 12:00 UTC+1 two more airports in the Balearic Islands were closed, including Spain's third largest Palma de Mallorca. All 13 airports were expected to reopen at 20:00 UTC+1 on 18 April. Other minor airports, not controlled by Aena, were closed as well, although it was thought they could be re-opened at 15:30 UTC+1.
Sweden	Sweden's airspace was closed at 20:00 UTC on 15 April. Airspace north of Söderhamn was reopened at 16:45 CEST on 18 April.
Switzerland	The Federal Office of Civil Aviation issued a notice to airmen at 14:15 UTC on 16 April stating that the FIR Switzerland would be closed for visual and instrument flight rules operations from 21:59 UTC on 16 April to 12:00 UTC on 19 April. Police, Search and Rescue (SAR) and emergency medical helicopter flights were exempted. Swiss International Air Lines informed its customers on 16 April that the airports at Zurich, Basel, Geneva, and Lugano airports would be closed, and that all flights going to those airports would be cancelled.
Turkey	The Directorate General of Civil Aviation closed central-northern national air zones by 13:30 UTC (16:30 UTC+3) on 18 April between flight levels FL200 and FL350 until 09:00 UTC (12:00 UTC+3) on 19 April. All airports, however, remained open.
Ukraine	The Ministry of Transport closed most national air zones by 00:00 UTC+3 on 17 April: only southern airports remained open. Aircraft from Egypt and Thailand, bound for Kyiv, landed at Simferopol. All Ukrainian airspace was closed by 15:00 EEST on 17 April.
United Kingdom	Scotland was the third region in Europe, after Iceland and Norway, to be affected, with all Scottish airports being closed to instrument flight rules (IFR) operations by 04:00 BST on 15 April. The United Kingdom's controlled airspace was closed to IFR flights at 11:00 UTC (12:00 BST) on 15 April. However, several Icelandair planes flying from Keflavik landed at Glasgow on 16 April. The last commercial flight to leave British airspace before the lockdown was imposed was a Singapore Airlines flight (number SQ317) from London Heathrow airport to Singapore Changi. It was officially scheduled to leave at 11:55 BST but became airborne at 11:32. There was no restriction on visual flight rules traffic. Royal Air Force search and rescue aircraft continued to operate as normal, as did flights between Land's End and the Isles of Scilly which operate in uncontrolled airspace at an altitude less than 3,000 feet (910 m). There remained no commercial airliners in British airspace until the morning of 16 April, when an Air Transat flight was given clearance to leave Glasgow for Toronto. On the evening of 20 April, it was announced that all the UK's airports would be opened from 22:00 BST. On 4 May, the airspace over Northern Ireland and the west of Scotland closed from 07:00 to 13:00 UTC+1. The CAA said the decision was based on information from the Volcanic Ash Advice Centre (VAAC). The no fly zone affected both Belfast airports and Derry airport. At 13:00 UTC+1 the airspace over Northern Ireland and Scotland fully re-opened. However, further closures occurred on 5 May. On 16 May, the airspace closed over much of the UK from 13:00 until 17 May 07:00 UTC+1. The airports affected were East Midlands, Manchester, Liverpool, Doncaster Sheffield, Humberside, Carlisle, Belfast City, Belfast International, Glasgow Prestwick, those on Scottish islands, and the Isle of Man. London airports remained open most of that period except for a period during the early morning of 17 May.

== Disruptions outside Europe: Canada ==
Almost every country with an international airport experienced some disruption due to flights to or from Europe being cancelled. Canada was the only country outside Europe recorded as having cancelled any flights due to a risk from ash clouds in its own airspace.

The Canadian airspace was never closed or restricted because of volcanic ash. Although the UK Met Office map of 21 April shows the ash cloud reaching Labrador, Newfoundland, the Maritime provinces, far eastern Quebec, and the Gulf of St. Lawrence, concentrations were expected to be sparse.

On Monday, 19 April, the combination of heavy fog with a warning by Transport Canada and Nav Canada of a 30% risk of volcanic ash reaching St. John's led to the cancellation of several flights scheduled to leave St. John's International Airport, Gander, and Deer Lake. Because of the heavy fog, it is unclear if the ash cloud warning was really the cause of the cancellations and delays in Newfoundland, and most flights returned to their normal schedule within the day. Air Canada said their flights were "subject to some delays due to inclement weather, unrelated to ash cloud." On Tuesday, 20 April, two Air Canada Jazz flights between the Magdalen Islands and Quebec City cancelled stop-offs in Gaspé because of ash over the Michel-Pouliot Gaspé Airport.

== Attempts to reopen airspace ==
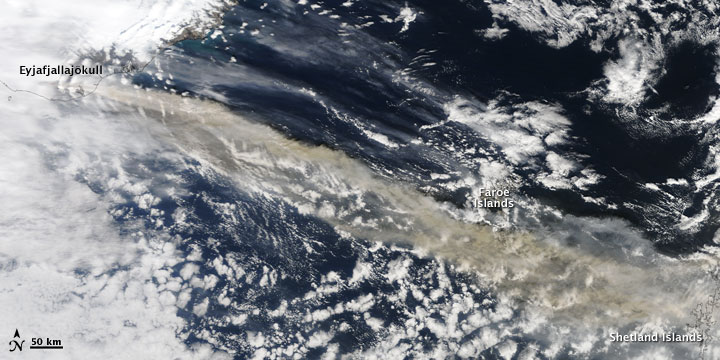
Ash plume blowing across the North Atlantic on 15 April.

Most airspace started to close from 15 April. However, in the days following there were brief windows free of the cloud at different locations which were exploited to make a few aircraft movements. There then followed test flights and pressure grew to re-evaluate the criteria for safe levels of ash to fly through.

On 16 April a 30-minute break at Manchester allowed two flights to land, and one aircraft to be moved to Florida, empty (as there was no time for passengers to board). At Glasgow, an Air Transat flight to Toronto took off while a British Airways flight from New York, and a Thomas Cook flight from Orlando and Icelandair flights from Keflavik landed.

On 17 April 2010, the president of German airline Air Berlin, in an interview with the newspaper Bild am Sonntag, stated that the risks for flights due to this volcanic haze were nonexistent, because the assessment was based only on a computer simulation produced by the VAAC. He went on to claim that the Luftfahrt-Bundesamt closed German airspace without checking the accuracy of these simulations. Spokesmen for Lufthansa and KLM stated that during their test flights, required by the European Union, there were no problems with the aircraft. On the morning of 17 April Lufthansa moved 10 aircraft from Munich to Frankfurt at low altitude following visual flight rules. There were no problems reported and no sign of damage to the planes. The same day, an Airbus belonging to Ural Airlines attempted flying below the ash clouds from Moscow to Rimini. When the airplane was in Austrian airspace, the crew reported being low on fuel and diverted to Vienna, where the airplane landed safely.

On the morning of 18 April KLM successfully carried out a test flight from Amsterdam to Düsseldorf with no problems. Afterwards, seven KLM planes with no passengers returned from Düsseldorf to Amsterdam. Air France also performed a test flight from Paris to Toulouse. In the evening of 18 April German airspace was partially re-opened for a period of 3 hours allowing a plane of stranded holidaymakers from Faro, Portugal to land at Hanover.

The vice president of the Dutch pilots union said "We are asking the authorities to really have a good look at the situation, because 100 per cent safety does not exist," Mr. Verhagen continued. "It's easy to close down air space because then it's perfectly safe, but at some time you have to resume flights."

In the afternoon of 19 April, German carriers Lufthansa and Air Berlin obtained permission for some flights from and to German airports under Visual Flight Rules. Lufthansa started sending planes to long-haul destination in order to return stranded passengers later that day.

Late on 19 April and early on 20 April, some flights were permitted to take off in northern Europe, including from Scotland and northern England, but Manchester Airport, that had planned to open on 20 April, remained closed because of a new ash cloud. The Civil Aviation Authority announced that all UK airports would be permitted to open from 2200 on 20 April. Twenty-six British Airways long-haul flights were already in the air and requesting permission to land.

By 20–21 April several airlines confirmed that "air service will be resumed in stages" and started publishing lists of selected flights that were "most likely to be operated" within one single day. "Effective Thursday, 22 April, Lufthansa will resume normal flight operations and offer you the usual reliability", claimed the airline at 15:30 on 21 April.

== Stranded travellers ==
The closure of the airspace left five million travellers stranded around the world, of which up to a million were British according to ABTA. Several thousand passengers were stranded in Asia, the United States, and Australia. Disruption was greater than that after the 11 September attacks, for example:

- The disruption had a significant effect on schools across the United Kingdom because it came at the end of the Easter Holidays and many pupils and teachers were among those stranded abroad.
- Swedish and Norwegian charter tourists visiting Mallorca, Canary Islands, Cyprus, or Egypt were flown to Barcelona or Athens and then driven back to Sweden and Norway by bus (a total distance of ≈3,400 kilometres (2,100 mi) from Athens to Oslo by road taking two and a half days without a break).
- Around 600 Mexican middle-school students, ranging from 12 to 16 years old, who had attended a competition in England for foreign students and scheduled to return home on 18 April were stranded for almost a week. Some started to return to Mexico on 21 April and by 24 April most of them were already home.

Stranded passengers were not necessarily given priority over new passengers for return flights. British Airways told passengers in India and China that any free seats were being sold on the open market, and advised them to buy new tickets and seek reimbursement on return.

In addition to being stranded, some travelers also encountered issues with their visas after arriving at destinations unexpectedly:

- At Brussels airport, 200 travelers from Bangladesh were unable to leave the building without a visa.
- Passengers from Kolkata headed for London on an Air India flight were diverted to Frankfurt, where they were unable to leave the airport to seek accommodation because they did not have visas for Germany.
- A group of passengers from the United Kingdom were facing arrest in Delhi over a breach of immigration laws, because they left the airport without visas.

On 17 April the UK Border Agency announced that it would make allowances for travellers who were unable to leave the UK and whose visas had expired, provided that evidence of travel reservations during the travel disruption was presented. Belarus, Serbia, Finland, and Russia also eased visa formalities for affected passengers.

=== Alternative transport routes ===
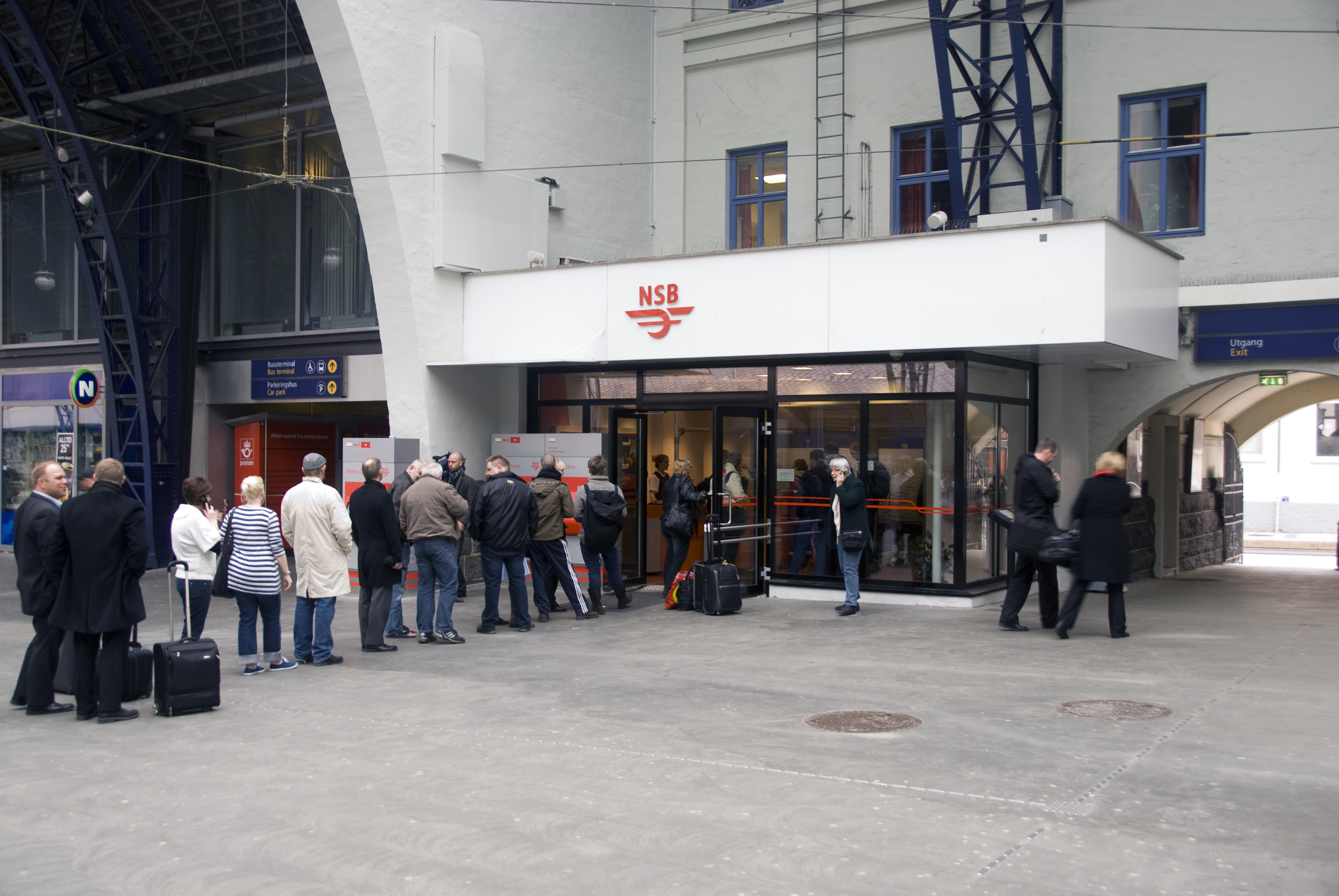
Queue at Bergen Station as travelers wait to purchase train tickets from the Norwegian State Railways

Passengers destined for countries where airspace was closed had to switch to other modes of transport, possibly via airports still open in Portugal, Morocco, and Turkey to the east. Once inside Europe, many people tried to reach their final destination by train or road. People hired coaches, hire cars, and taxis while the train companies reported a large increase in passenger numbers. Eurostar passenger trains were solidly booked, the Eurotunnel car-carrying trains which run through the Channel Tunnel were very busy, and additional services were scheduled. Travel conditions in France were compounded by an ongoing rail strike affecting long-distance trains.

Most UK and Irish ferry routes were exceptionally busy and coach operator Bus Éireann arranged extra Eurolines services between Ireland and England via ferry.

The websites Twitter and Facebook, as well as other sites like Roadsharing, were used to arrange alternative travel plans involving boats and ships, trains, and other forms of transportation such as cars, as well as to try to find rooms for the night in the cities where they were stuck. As an alternative to face-to-face business meetings, videoconferencing was also used by the European Union, governments, and companies.

Many people who had to travel, particularly those stranded while away from their home countries, faced large costs for unanticipated travel and accommodation at a time of scarcity. Some costs were covered by compensation from airlines and travel insurance, although there were many disputes over payments. Some people incurred large taxicab fares over long distances, such as English actor John Cleese, who took a taxi from Oslo to Brussels and paid €3,000 for the journey.

On 18 April 2010, UK Government ministers announced a plan for flights to land and take off in Spain, and to transport passengers by sea back to the United Kingdom. On 19 April, the cabinet crisis response committee (COBRA) decided that Royal Navy ships should be utilised to repatriate stranded British travellers, in Operation Cunningham. HMS Ark Royal, HMS Ocean, and HMS Albion were deployed, but only Albion was directly involved in repatriation.

After the disruption in transatlantic flight, the Cunard Line said its volume of calls inquiring about booking passage on its ocean liner RMS Queen Mary 2 by stranded air passengers wishing to cross by ship had tripled since the weekend of 16 April.

== Criticism of airspace closure ==
There was much criticism by airlines, which suffered large financial losses, of the airspace closures as unnecessary; however, the EU transport presidency disagreed, saying that "This situation is causing them important losses, but safety is paramount".

== Military flying ==
Some military aircraft which flew during the period of closure suffered engine damage, although no crashes were reported.

On 15 April, five Finnish Air Force F-18 fighter jets on exercise flew into the ash cloud in northern Finland. Volcanic dust was found on the engines of three of the aircraft and a further inspection revealed extensive damage by molten glass deposits inside the combustion chamber of one of the engines. The engines were sent for disassembly and overhaul. As a result, all unnecessary military flights were cancelled except for identification flights to enforce sovereign airspace. Meanwhile, a BAE Hawk trainer with special equipment to sample the volcanic dust was being flown from the 41st squadron in Kauhava. Even short test flights with an F-18 revealed engine damage sufficient to destroy engines.

On 19 April, NATO reported finding molten glass in the engines of at least one F-16, the result of flying through the ash cloud, leading to the scaling-down of U.S. military exercises. Royal Air Force flights to Selly Oak Hospital in Birmingham were grounded, and the United Kingdom Ministry of Defence considered flying British casualties of the Afghan War to coalition countries.

On 23 April it was announced that British Royal Air Force training flights had been suspended following volcanic ash damage to the engines of Eurofighter Typhoon aircraft.

== Impacts of the disruption ==
The disruption accelerated the integration of the national air traffic control systems into the Single European Sky and the immediate creation of a crisis coordination group to handle future transportation disruptions.

The ash indirectly affected many scheduled cultural and sporting events because key participants were unable to attend, including the funeral of Polish president Lech Kaczyński in Kraków on 18 April 2010. The funeral was to have been attended by 69 presidents, prime ministers, and other heads of states. Almost half of these, including Barack Obama, Angela Merkel, José Luis Rodríguez Zapatero, Stephen Harper, and Nicolas Sarkozy, were unable to travel to Poland because of the disrupted air traffic.

There was also a wider impact on the economies of several countries. However, there were some environmental advantages arising from a saving of around 1.3 to 2.8 million tonnes of carbon dioxide emissions.

Many supply chains were affected by the disruptions across the globe, which led to discussions on the importance of supply chain resilience in the aftermath of the event.

== Ash cloud maps ==
The following maps, with the volcano in red, depict the progress of the ash cloud during the period of disruption.

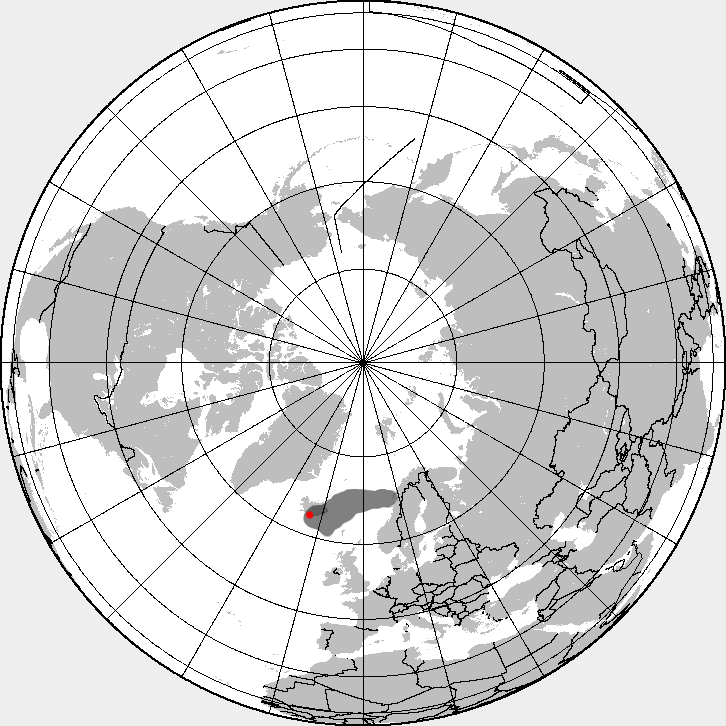
Depiction of the estimated ash cloud at 18:00 UTC on 14 April 2010.

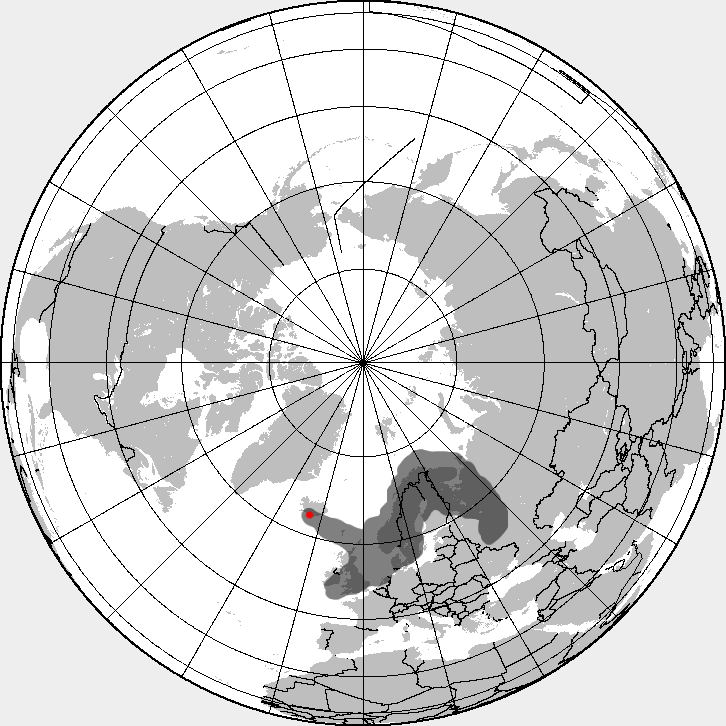
Depiction of the estimated ash cloud at 18:00 UTC on 15 April 2010.

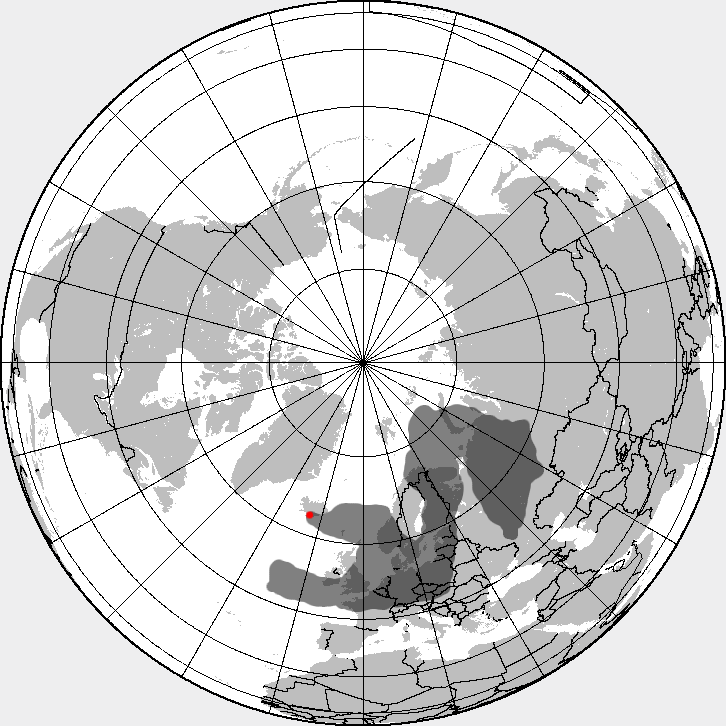
Depiction of the estimated ash cloud at 18:00 UTC on 16 April 2010.

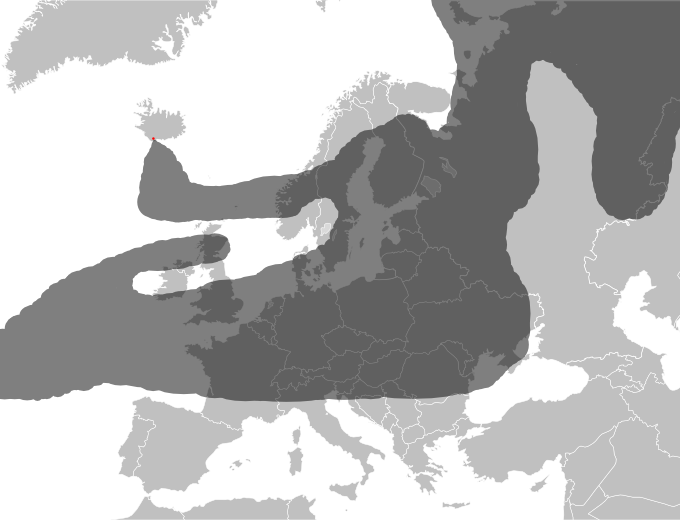
Depiction of the estimated ash cloud at 18:00 UTC on 17 April 2010.

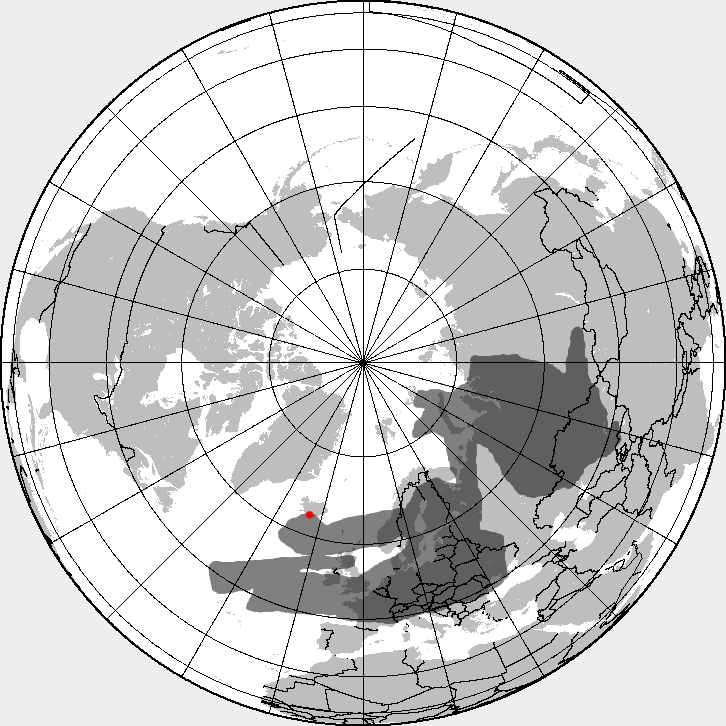
Approximate depiction of the ash cloud at 18:00 UTC on 17 April 2010.

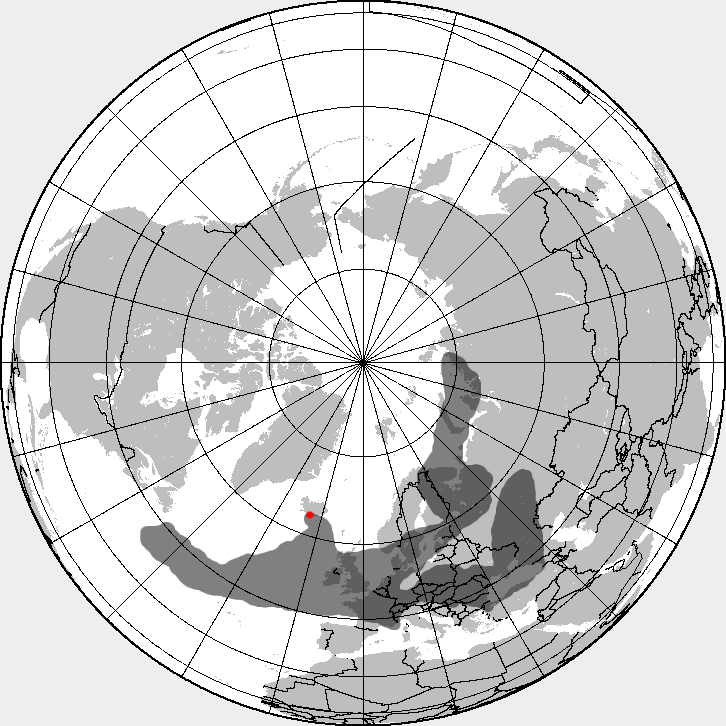
Approximate depiction of the ash cloud at 18:00 UTC on 18 April 2010.

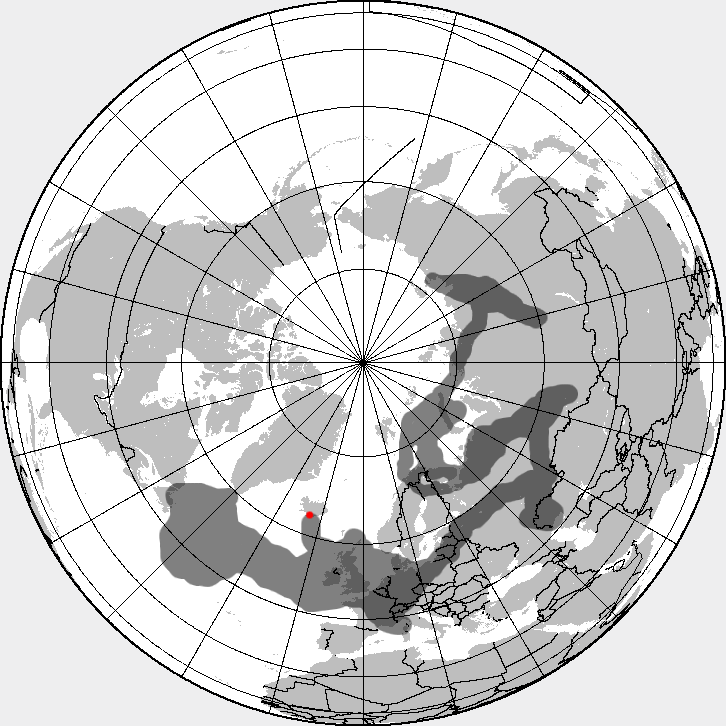
Approximate depiction of the ash cloud at 18:00 UTC on 19 April 2010.

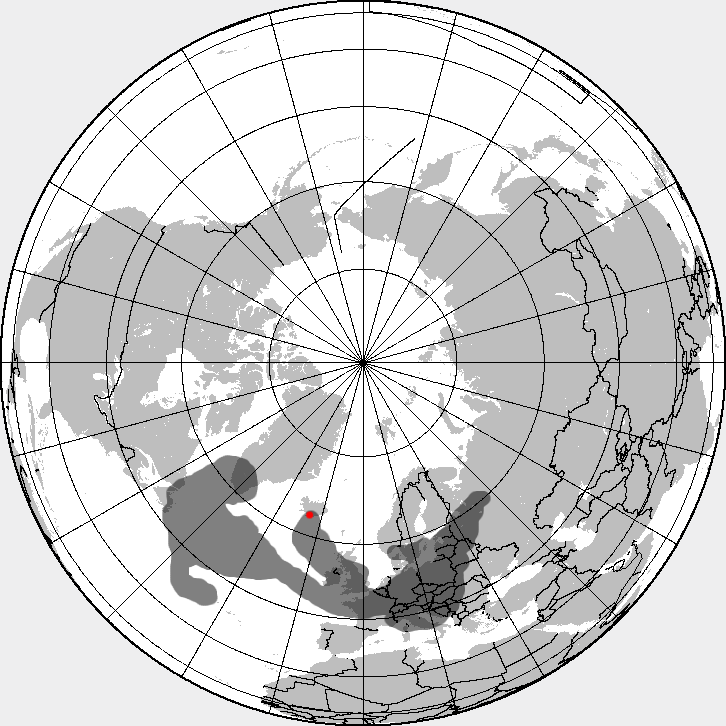
Approximate depiction of the ash cloud at 18:00 UTC on 20 April 2010.

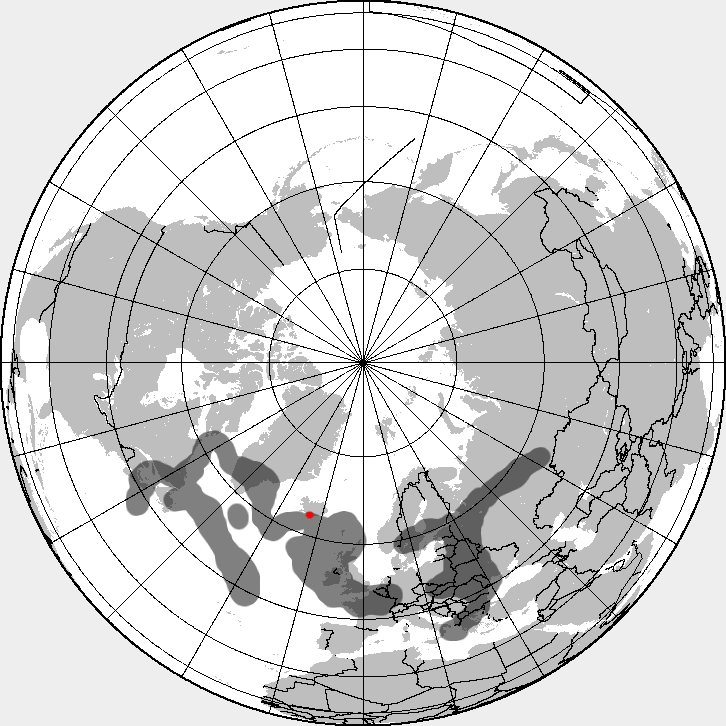
Approximate depiction of the ash cloud at 18:00 UTC on 21 April 2010.

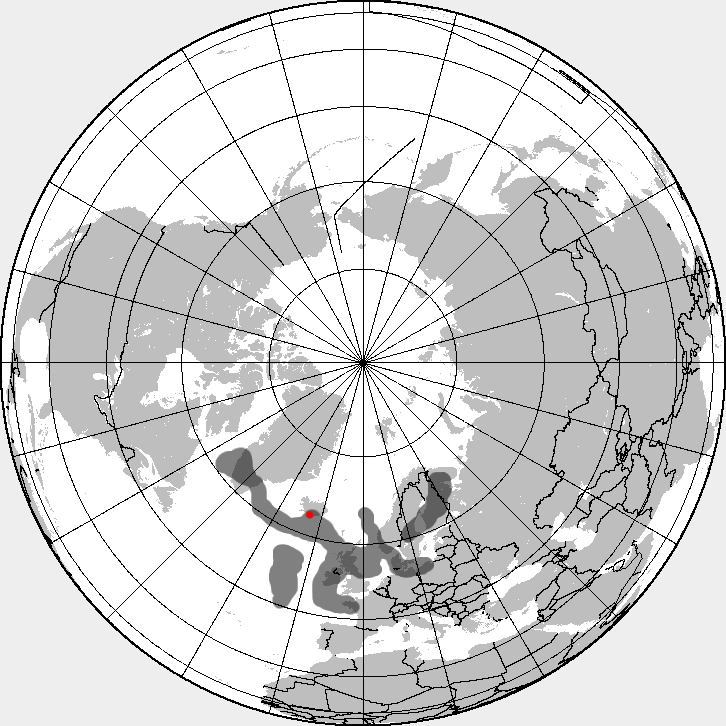
Approximate depiction of the ash cloud at 18:00 UTC on 22 April 2010.

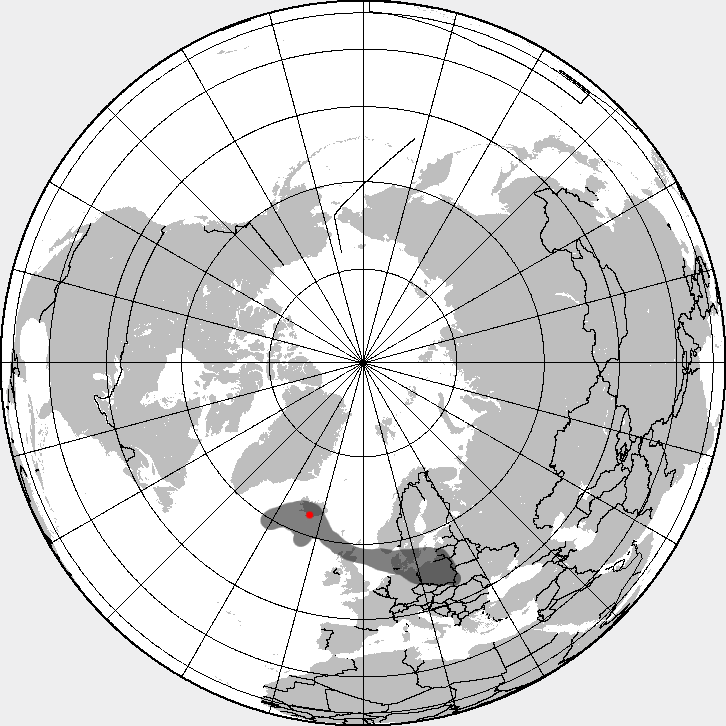
Approximate depiction of the ash cloud at 18:00 UTC on 23 April 2010.

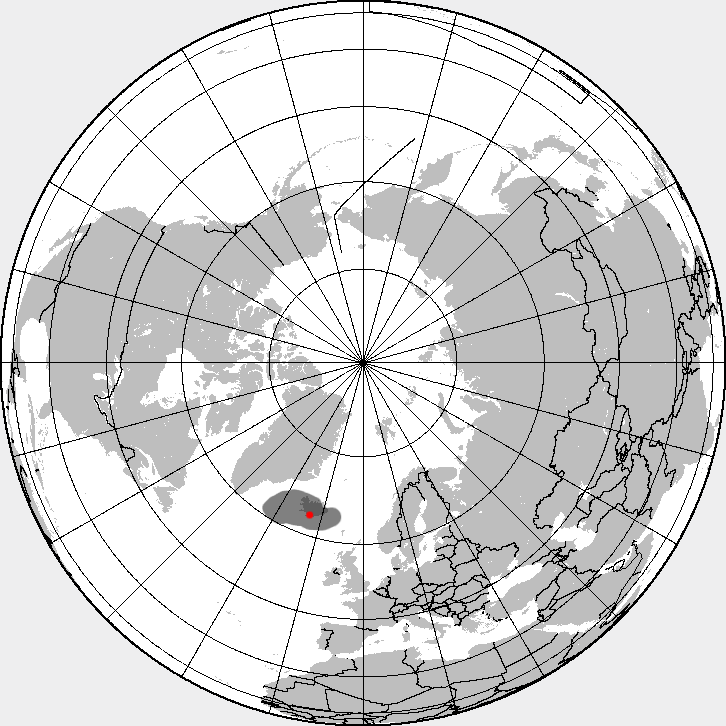
Approximate depiction of the ash cloud at 18:00 UTC on 24 April 2010.

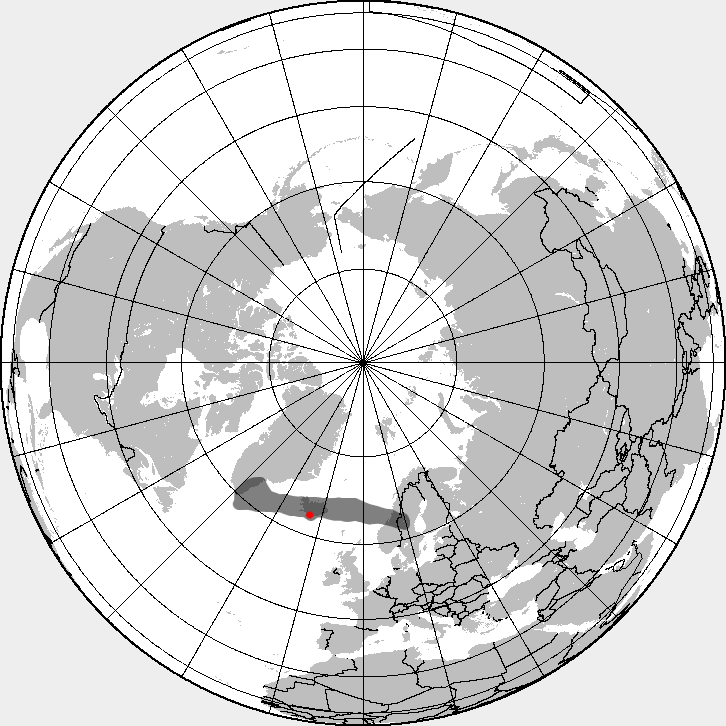
Approximate depiction of the ash cloud at 18:00 UTC on 25 April 2010.

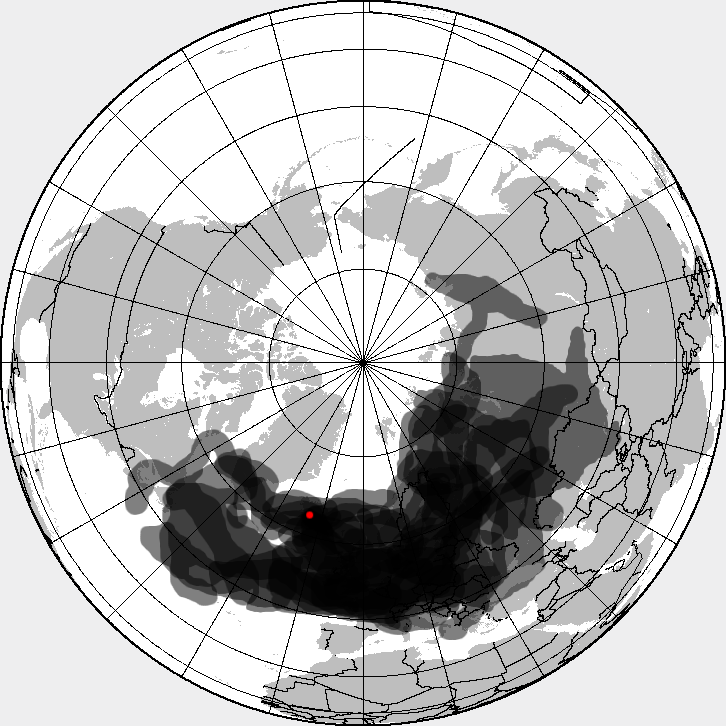
Composite map spanning 14–25 April 2010

== See also ==
- 2011 eruption of Grímsvötn
- Crisis situations and protests in Europe since 2000
- Volcanic ash and aviation safety
