= Volcanic Ash Advisory Center =

United Nations expert group

A Volcanic Ash Advisory Center (VAAC) is a group of experts responsible for coordinating and disseminating information on atmospheric volcanic ash clouds that may endanger aviation. As of 2019, there are nine Volcanic Ash Advisory Centers located around the world, each one focusing on a particular geographical region. Their analyses are made public in the form of volcanic ash advisories (VAAs), involving expertise analysis of satellite observations, ground and pilot observations and interpretation of ash dispersion models.

The worldwide network of Volcanic Ash Advisory Centers was set up by the International Civil Aviation Organization (ICAO), an agency of the United Nations, as part of the International Airways Volcano Watch (IAVW), an international set of arrangements for monitoring and providing warnings to aircraft of volcanic ash. The operations and development of the IAVW are coordinated by the Meteorology Panel (METP) established by the ICAO Air Navigation Commission. The individual VAACs are run as part of national weather forecasting organisations of the country where they are based, e.g. the US National Weather Service or the British Met Office.

== Precedents ==
The centers were set up in the 1990s to improve forecasts of the locations of ash clouds from volcanic eruptions following incidents where commercial aircraft had flown through volcanic ash resulting in the loss of engine power. British Airways Flight 9, a Boeing 747, lost power to all four engines in 1982 over Indonesia after an eruption of Mount Galunggung. KLM Flight 867, another Boeing 747, again lost power to all engines in 1989 over Alaska after Mount Redoubt erupted. It was recognised following these and other incidents that volcanic ash was a danger to commercial aviation and that the only way to ensure that there would be no loss of an aircraft was to alert pilots in a timely manner to divert their flight around the cloud.

== Locations ==
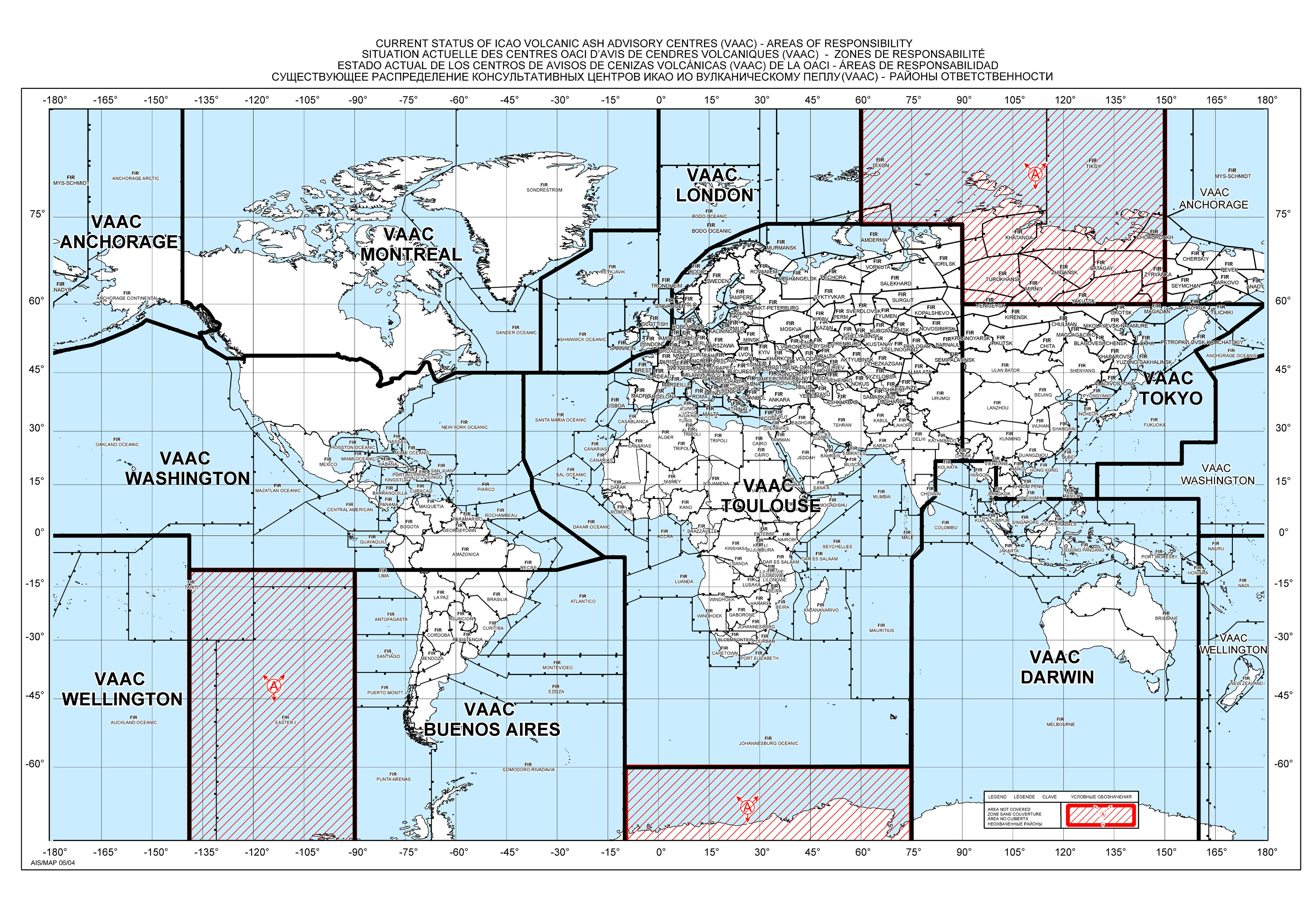
Coverage of the nine VAAC around the world

There are nine VAAC locations each with a defined area to monitor. The centers coordinate with adjacent VAAC, flight control centers within and adjacent to their area as well as meteorological offices within and adjacent to their area of operation.

The areas covered by the VAAC are set either by coordinates or by Flight Information Regions (FIR) that are internationally agreed as part of the IAVW program of the ICAO and the areas that each has responsibility is set out in the Handbook on the IAVW.

Name	Area of responsibility	Host national organisation	Link
Anchorage	Anchorage Oceanic, Anchorage Continental, Oakland Oceanic FIRs North of N4300 E16500, N4812 W15000, N4812 W12800 Anchorage Arctic, and West to E15000, North of N6000	National Weather Service	Anchorage VAAC
Buenos Aires	South of S1000 between W01000 and W09000	Servicio Meteorológico Nacional - Argentina	Buenos Aires VAAC
Darwin	Southward from N2000 and from E08200 to E10000, and Southward from N1000 and from E10000 to E16000, and the Colombo, Melbourne and Brisbane FIRs	Bureau of Meteorology	Darwin VAAC
London	South of the North Pole and North of N7100 between the Prime Meridian and E09000 Bodø Oceanic, Finland, København, London, Norway, Reykjavik, Scottish Shannon Shanwick Oceanic and Sweden	Met Office	London VAAC
Montreal	Søndrestrøm, Gander Oceanic, Canadian Continental FIRs (including the Arctic Ocean)	Meteorological Service of Canada	Montreal VAAC
Tokyo	N6000 to N1000 and from E09000 to Oakland Oceanic and Anchorage Oceanic and Continental FIR boundaries except the area within N2000 E09000 to N2000 E10000 to N1000 E10000 to N1000 E09000	Japan Meteorological Agency	Tokyo VAAC
Toulouse	Santa Maria Oceanic FIR, AFI Region down to the South Pole, EUR Region (except for Finland, Kobenhavn, London, Norway, Scottish, Shannon and Sweden FIRs) West of E09000 and South of N7100, MID Region, and ASIA Region West of E09000 North of N2000 (plus Mumbai, Chennai (West of E08200) and Male FIRs)	Météo-France	Toulouse VAAC
Washington	New York Oceanic Oakland Oceanic South of N4300 E16500 to N4820 W15000 to N4820 W12800, United States Continental FIRs, New York Oceanic FIR North of S1000 W14000 East of 0000 W14000 and North of S10000 W14000 to S1000 W03000, Nadi and Nauru FIRs North of Equator	NOAA	Washington VAAC
Wellington	Southward from the Equator and from 160 east to 140 west, except for the Melbourne and Brisbane FIRs, and southward from 10 south and from 140 west to 90 west.	Meteorological Service of New Zealand Limited	Wellington VAAC

== Volcanic ash advisories ==
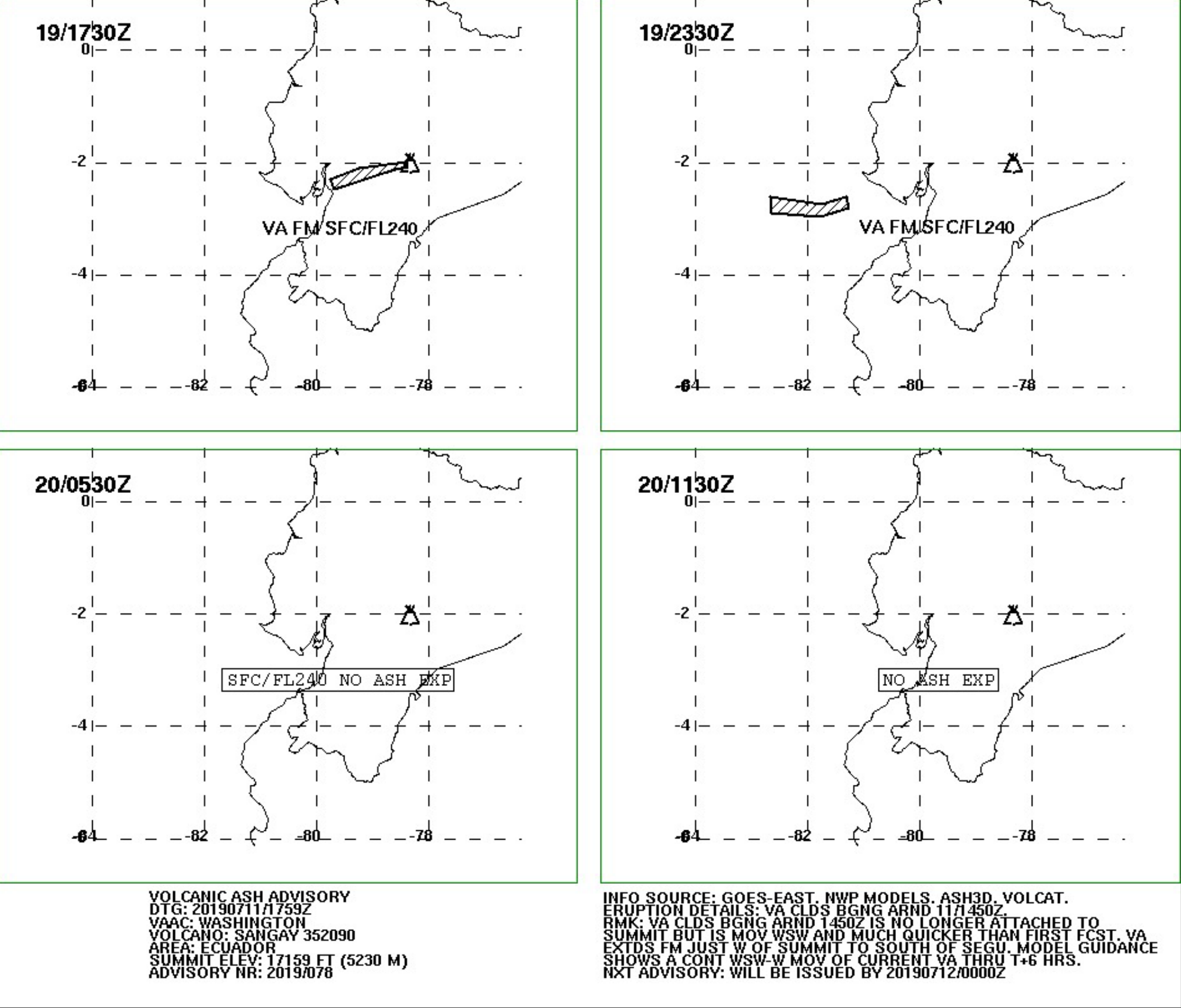
A volcanic ash advisory issued by VAAC Washington, depicted in graphic format, showing an eruption of Sangay, Ecuador

When an ash cloud is detected, the VAAC will gather all the available observations, using them in conjunction with both ash dispersion and numerical weather models, to forecast the path and evolution of the ash cloud. They will then issue a volcanic ash advisory (VAA) to aviation and meteorological offices as stated within the Handbook on the IAVW. This will be in the format of a text based message, with a corresponding graphic.

Within the advisory the following information will be provided: the name of the volcano, the country/region, location and summit elevation of the volcano, the source of the information, e.g. satellite or pilot observation, details of the eruption including time of day in UTC and date of the eruption, details of the ash cloud including the vertical extent (in flight levels) and horizontal extent, detail on the current movement of the ash cloud, forecast movement and evolution of the cloud for 6, 12 and 18 hours ahead following the time of the advisory, any remarks by the VAAC and finally the next update time. The advisory will be issued until the cloud is no longer identifiable from satellite and no longer observed in the area, and the volcano has no further eruption reports.

== See also ==
- Mount Pelée
- Peléan eruption
- Plinian eruption
