= Volcanic ash and aviation safety =

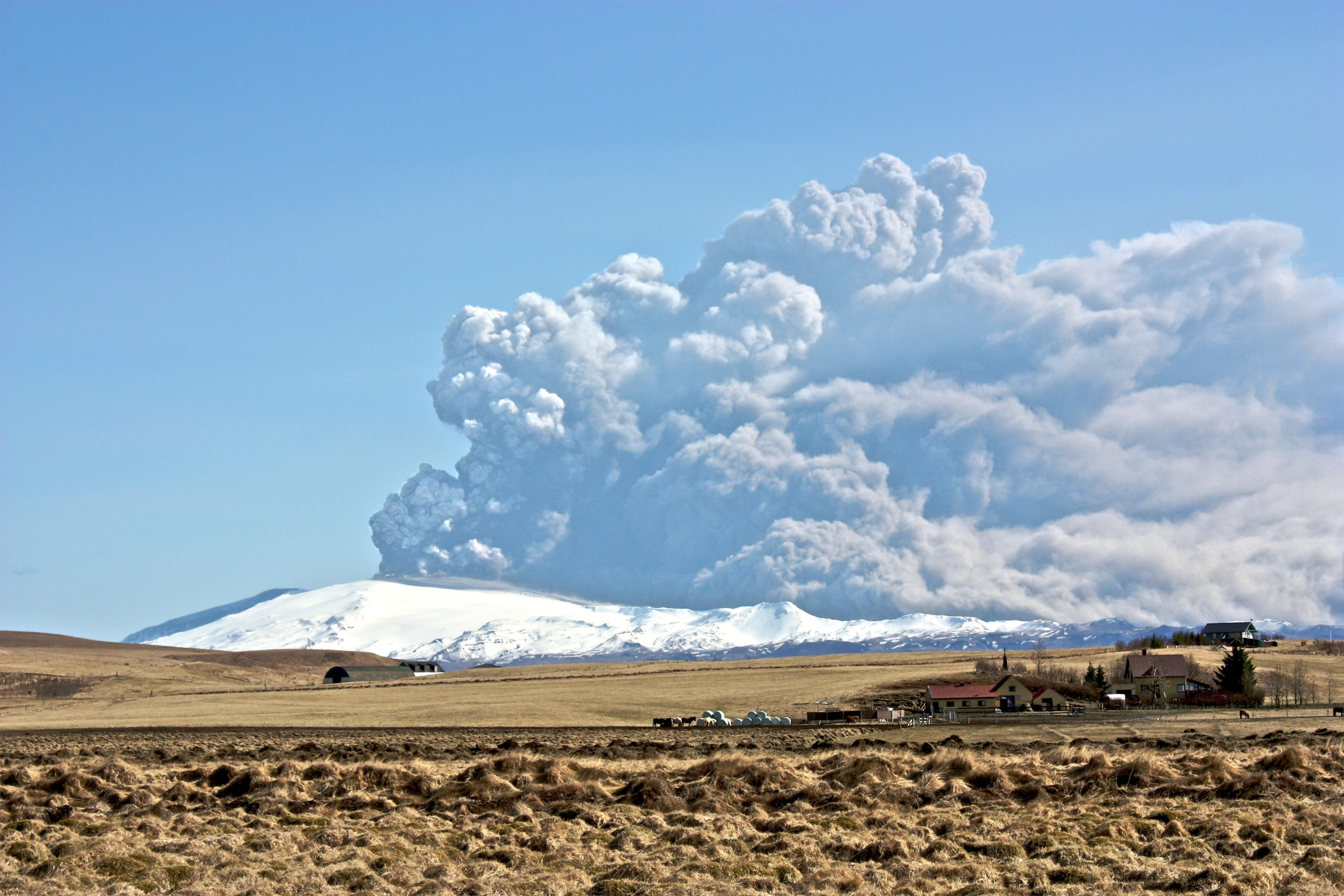
Volcanic ash from the eruption of Eyjafjallajökull disrupted air travel in Europe in 2010.

Plumes of volcanic ash near active volcanoes are a flight safety hazard, especially for night flights. Volcanic ash is hard and abrasive, and can quickly cause significant wear to propellers and turbocompressor blades, and scratch cockpit windows, impairing visibility. The ash contaminates fuel and water systems, can jam gears, and make engines flame out. Its particles have low melting points and readily melt in the engines' combustion chambers; this creates a ceramic mass that sticks to turbine blades, fuel nozzles, and combustors, which can quickly lead to total engine failure. Ash can also contaminate the cabin and damage avionics.

In 1991, the aviation industry decided to set up Volcanic Ash Advisory Centers (VAACs) for liaison between meteorologists, volcanologists, and the aviation industry. Before 2010, aircraft engine manufacturers had not defined specific particle levels above which they considered engines at risk. Airspace regulators took the general approach that if ash concentration rose above zero, they considered airspace unsafe, and consequently closed it.

The costs of air travel disruption in Europe after a volcanic eruption in 2010 forced aircraft manufacturers to specify limits on how much ash they considered acceptable for a jet engine to ingest without damage. In April, the UK CAA, in conjunction with engine manufacturers, set the safe upper limit of ash density at 2 mg per cubic metre of air space. From May 2010, the CAA revised the safe limit upwards to 4 mg per cubic metre of air space.

To minimise further disruption that this and other volcanic eruptions could cause, the CAA created a new category of restricted airspace called a Time Limited Zone. Airspace categorised as TLZ is similar to airspace under severe weather conditions, in that restrictions should be of a short duration. However, a key difference with TLZ airspace is that airlines must produce certificates of compliance for aircraft they want to enter these areas. Any airspace where ash density exceeds 4 mg per cubic metre is prohibited airspace.

Volcanic ash in the immediate vicinity of the eruption plume is different in particle size range and density than that in downwind dispersal clouds, which contain only the finest particle sizes of ash. Experts have not established the ash loading that affects normal engine operation (other than engine lifetime and maintenance costs). Whether this silica-melt risk remains at the much lower ash densities characteristic of downstream ash clouds is currently unclear.

Experts recognised that there was an issue following British Airways Flight 9 in 1982, and therefore the ICAO established the Volcanic Ash Warning Study Group. Due to the difficulty in forecasting accurate information out to 12 hours and beyond, the ICAO later set up Volcanic Ash Advisory Centers (VAACs).

== Volcanic hazards to aviation ==
Volcanic ash consists of small tephra, which are bits of pulverized rock and glass less than 2 millimetres (0.079 in) in diameter created by volcanic eruptions. The ash enters the atmosphere from the force of the eruption and convection currents from the heated air, and is then carried away from the volcano by winds. The ash with the smallest size can remain in the atmosphere for a considerable period of time, and can drift away from the eruption point. The ash cloud can be dangerous to aviation if it reaches the heights of aircraft flight paths.

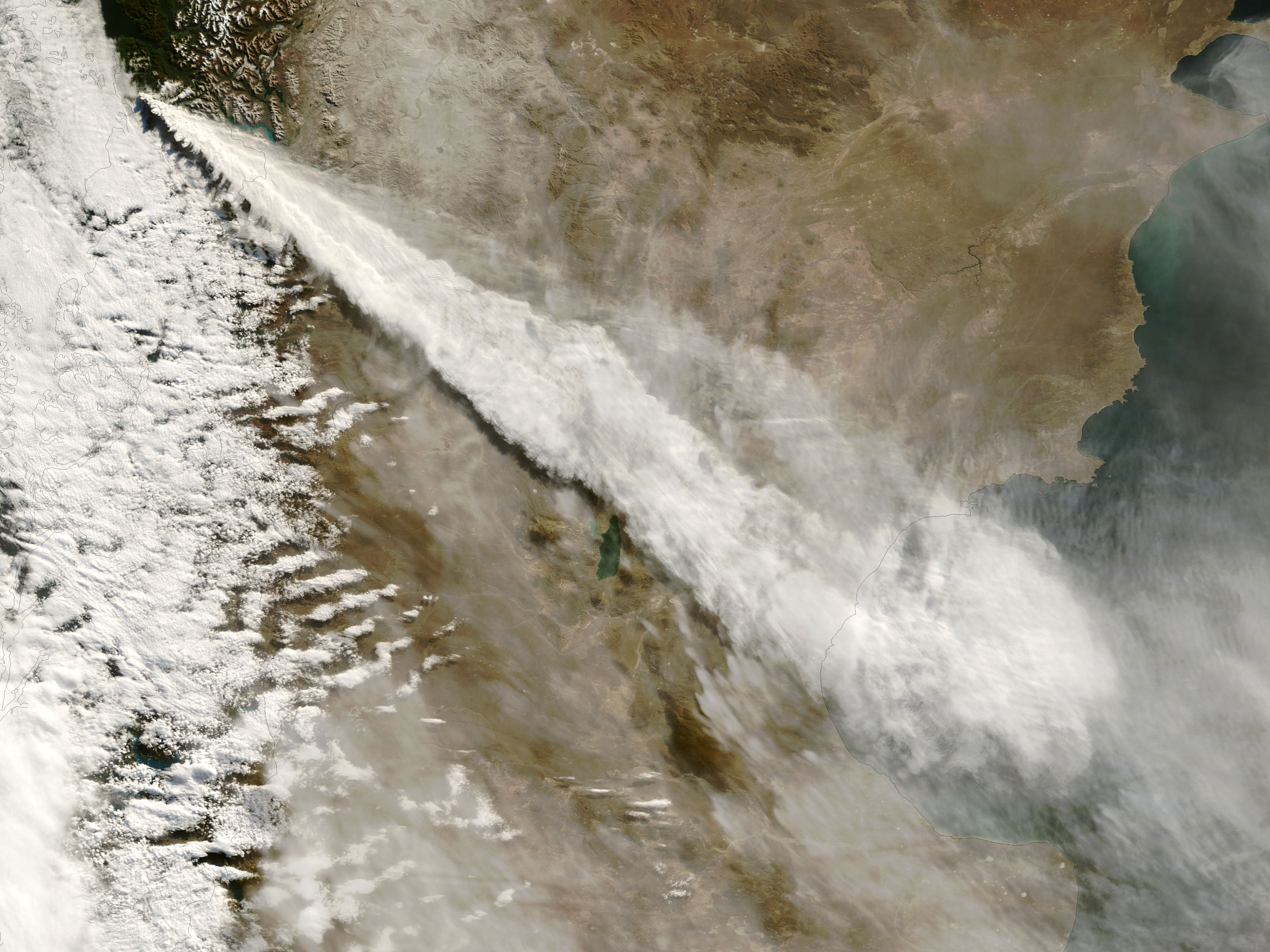
Ash cloud from the 2008 eruption of Chaitén volcano stretching across Patagonia from the Pacific to the Atlantic Ocean

Pilots cannot see ash clouds at night, and ash particles are too small to return an echo to on-board weather radars on commercial airliners. Even when flying in daylight, pilots may interpret a visible ash cloud as a normal cloud of water vapour and not a danger—especially if the ash has travelled far from the eruption site. In the image from the Chaitén volcano, the ash cloud has spread thousands of kilometers from the eruption site, crossing the width of South America from the Pacific coast and spreading over the Atlantic.

Volcanic ash has a melting point of approximately 1,100 °C (2,010 °F), which is below the operating temperature of modern commercial jet engines, about 1,400 °C (2,550 °F). Volcanic ash can damage gas turbines in a number of ways. These can be categorised into those that pose an immediate hazard to the engines and those that present a maintenance problem.

=== Immediate hazards to aircraft ===
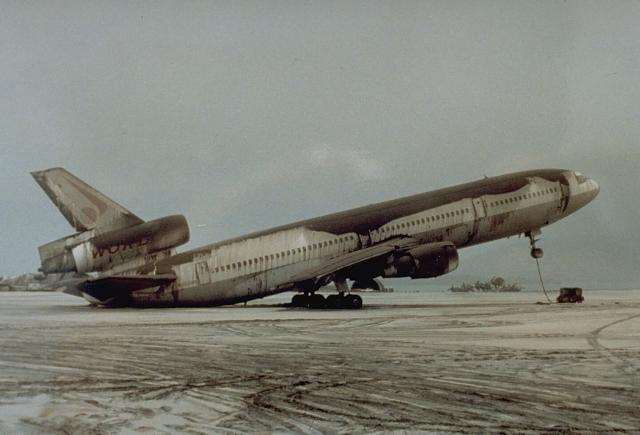
Volcanic ash deposits on a parked McDonnell-Douglas DC-10-30 during the 1991 eruption of Mount Pinatubo, causing the aircraft to rest on its tail. Falling ash behaves in a similar manner to snow, but the sheer weight of deposits can cause serious damage to buildings and vehicles, as seen here, where the deposits shifted the 120-ton airliner's centre of gravity.

Volcanic ash is composed of fragments of rock, crystalline material, and volcanic glass. The glass component has the lowest melting temperature—lower than temperatures inside the combustor of a gas turbine engine. Ash that finds its way into the combustor may melt. Combustor and turbine components are cooled, as the metals they are made of have lower melting temperatures than the gas temperature inside the engine core. Molten ash that touches these surfaces is likely to freeze, and accrete on the metal surface.

The most sensitive surface is the high-pressure turbine nozzle guide vanes (NGVs), situated immediately downstream of the combustor. The gas flow is choked through the NGVs, and so the flow area through the NGVs is a controlling area for the engine. If this area is reduced due to an accretion of ash, a smaller mass flow rate of gas passes through the engine core. Reduced mass flow leads to the turbine doing less work. The turbine drives the compressor, which accordingly also does less work compressing the air. If the compressor can no longer contain the high pressure gas in the engine core, the gas flow can reverse and flow out of the front of the engine. This is known as an engine surge or a compressor surge, and is often accompanied by a ball of flame that bursts out the front of the engine. This surge is likely to extinguish the flame in the engine combustor, known as a 'flame-out'. Once the high pressure in the core dissipates, the engine should be free to restart. Restarting an engine at altitude can be difficult, due to the lower temperatures and pressures of the ambient gas, but is not normally a problem. The reduced flow area of the NGVs can make it harder to restart the engine.

Volcanic ash carries significant electrostatic charge. Fine ash that enters electronic components within the engine or airframe can cause electrical failure—which poses an immediate hazard to the aircraft.

=== Ash-induced problems requiring increased maintenance ===
1. Volcanic ash, as a hard substance, damages gas turbine compressors. It erodes by impacting compressor blades and vanes and removing material—and abrades by three body interactions between the rotating blade, ash particle, and compressor annulus. Changing the shapes of the blades and vanes and increasing gaps between blades and annuli both help reduce engine fuel efficiency and operability.
2. Molten ash that sticks to cooled surfaces can block cooling holes. This stops cooling air flow and heats surrounding metal, leading to accelerated thermal fatigue. This process affects combustor and turbine components.
3. Ash can accumulate and partially block fuel spray nozzles, impairing air and fuel flow fields and mixture stoichiometries in the combustor. Such adverse conditions reduce engine performance and can create local hot spots that increase the combuster's thermal fatigue rate.

=== Sulfur dioxide clouds ===
Sulfur dioxide—another product of volcanoes that is carried in ash clouds after an eruption—is corrosive to aircraft that fly through it.

There has been an attempt to prove that the sulphur dioxide usually accompanying a volcanic eruption is indeed a good indication of the presence of ash clouds such as to facilitate avoidance of ash clouds in aviation.

However, it has been found that the two species of clouds tend to separate due to windshear. Additionally, the detection methods have limitations, as both species have the potential to be masked by other types of aerosol, such as water or ice; this contributes to great variability in the data.

Therefore, as there is no consistent overlap between SO_{2} and the ash, SO_{2} is not a reliable indicator for ash clouds.

== Accidents and incidents ==
In 1982, British Airways Flight 9 was a flight from London to Auckland. During the Kuala Lumpur to Perth section of its journey, the Boeing 747-200 aircraft flew through an ash cloud of Mount Galunggung, losing power from all four engines, and descended from 37,000 feet (11,000 m) to only 13,500 feet (4,100 m) before the flight crew managed to restart three of the engines and land at Jakarta.

In 1989, KLM Flight 867 was a flight from Amsterdam to Tokyo via Anchorage. On descent into Anchorage, the aircraft was descending through 24,000 feet (7,300 m) and the 747-400 encountered the ash cloud from Mount Redoubt and all four engines failed. At 13,000 feet (4,000 m), the two left engines restarted and at 11,000 feet (3,400 m), the two remaining engines restarted. Minutes after, the aircraft made a successful emergency landing at Anchorage International Airport.
