= British Airways Flight 009 =

1982 aviation accident over Indonesia

Coordinates: 7°15′24″S 108°04′37″E

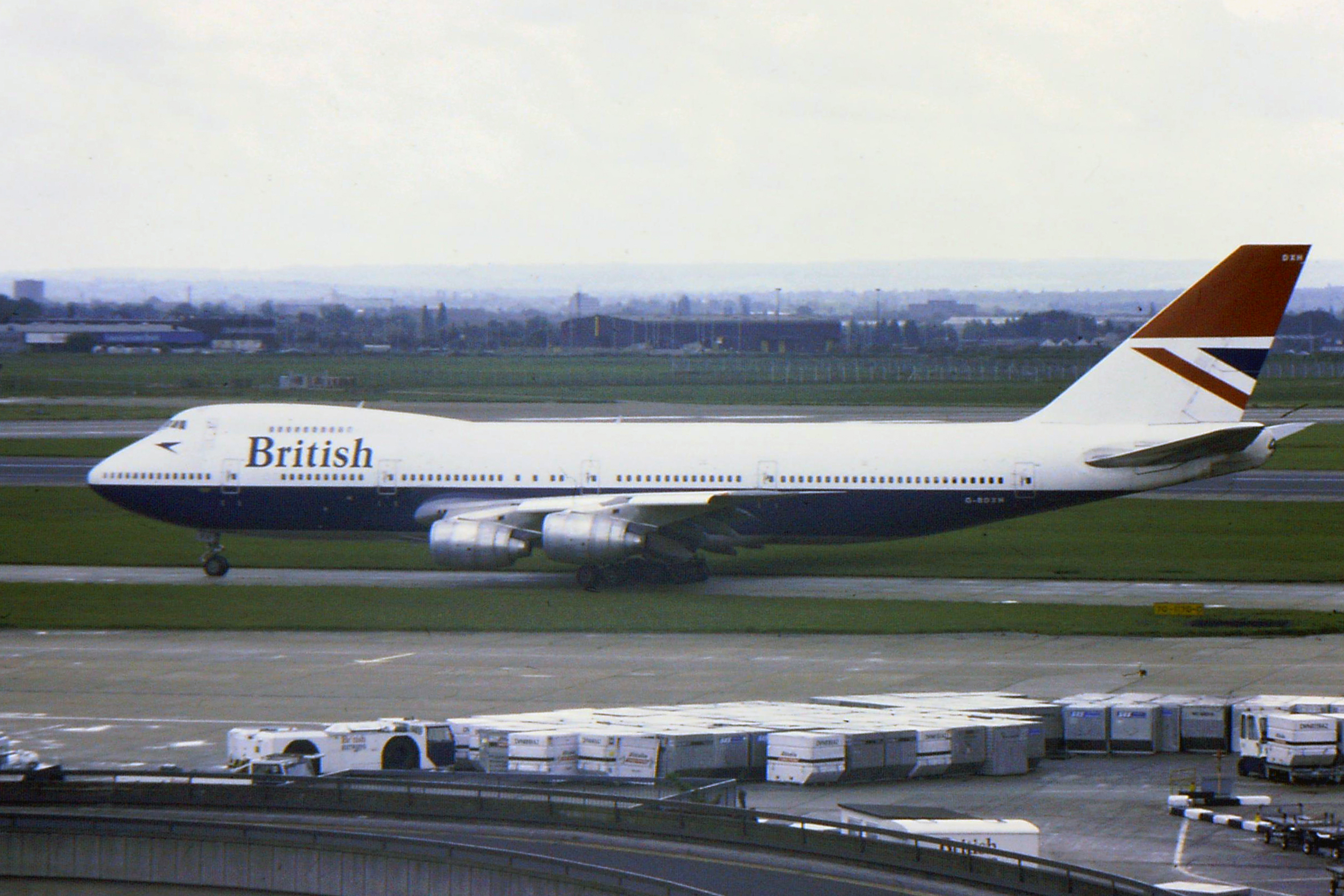
- G-BDXH, the aircraft involved in the accident, pictured in January 1982

Accident
- Date: 24 June 1982
- Summary: Quadruple engine flameout due to blockage by volcanic ash
- Site: Near Mount Galunggung, West Java, Indonesia

Aircraft
- Aircraft type: Boeing 747-236B (Note: The aircraft was a Boeing 747-236B model; Boeing assigns a unique code for each company that buys one of its aircraft, which is applied as an infix to the model number at the time the aircraft is built, hence "747-236B" designates a 747-200B built for British Airlines, which has 36 as its customer code.)
- Aircraft name: City of Edinburgh
- Operator: British Airways
- IATA flight No.: BA009
- ICAO flight No.: BAW009
- Call sign: SPEEDBIRD 9
- Registration: G-BDXH
- Flight origin: London-Heathrow Airport, England, United Kingdom
- 1st stopover: Sahar Airport, Bombay, Maharashtra, India
- 2nd stopover: Sultan Abdul Aziz Shah Airport, Kuala Lumpur, Malaysia
- 3rd stopover: Perth Airport, Perth, Western Australia, Australia
- Last stopover: Melbourne Airport, Melbourne, Victoria, Australia
- Destination: Auckland Airport, Auckland, New Zealand
- Occupants: 263
- Passengers: 248
- Crew: 15
- Fatalities: 0
- Survivors: 263

British Airways Flight 009, sometimes referred to by its callsign SPEEDBIRD 9 or as the Jakarta incident, was a scheduled British Airways flight from London Heathrow to Auckland, with stops in Mumbai, Kuala Lumpur, Perth and Melbourne.

On 24 June 1982, the route was flown by City of Edinburgh, a Boeing 747-236B registered as G-BDXH. The aircraft flew into a cloud of volcanic ash thrown up by the eruption of Mount Galunggung around 110 miles (180 km) south-east of Jakarta, Indonesia, resulting in the failure of all four engines. Partly because the event occurred at night, obscuring the cloud, and partly because volcanic ashes were not recognized as a risk for jets at that time, the reason for the failure was not immediately apparent to the crew or air traffic control. The aircraft was diverted to Jakarta in the hope that enough engines could be restarted to allow it to land there. It glided out of the ash cloud, and all engines were restarted (although engine number 2 started vibrating and the crew had to shut it down soon after), allowing the aircraft to land safely at Halim Perdanakusuma International Airport in Jakarta.

The crew members of the accident segment had boarded the aircraft in Kuala Lumpur, while many of the passengers had been aboard since the flight began in London.

== Incident ==
At the time of the incident, the flight crew of BA009 consisted of 41-year-old Captain Eric Henry Moody, 32-year-old Senior First Officer Roger Greaves, and 40-year-old Senior Engineer Officer Barry Townley-Freeman. The flight crew members had boarded the aircraft at Sultan Abdul Aziz Shah Airport in Kuala Lumpur and were due to pilot the 747-200 for the Kuala Lumpur-to-Perth leg.

Shortly after contacting the Air Traffic Control at Halim Airport in Jakarta at around 13:40 UTC (20:40 Jakarta time) above the Indian Ocean, south of Java, the crew first noticed an unusual effect on the windscreen similar to St. Elmo's fire, while Moody was heading to the lavatory. Despite the weather radar showing clear skies, the crew switched on engine anti-ice and the passenger seat belt signs as a precaution.

As the flight progressed, smoke began to accumulate in the passenger cabin of the aircraft; it was first assumed to be cigarette smoke. However, it soon began to grow thicker and had an odour of sulphur. Passengers who had a view of the aircraft's engines through the window noted that they were unusually bright blue, with light shining forward through the fan blades and producing a stroboscopic effect.

Around 13:42 UTC (20:42 Jakarta time), the number-four Rolls-Royce RB211 engine began surging and soon flamed out. The flight crew immediately performed the engine shutdown drill, quickly cutting off fuel supply and arming the fire extinguishers. Less than a minute later, at 13:43 UTC (20:43 Jakarta time), engine two surged and flamed out. Within seconds, and almost simultaneously, engines one and three flamed out, prompting the flight engineer to exclaim, "I don't believe it—all four engines have failed!"

Without engine thrust, a 747-200 has a glide ratio of roughly 15:1, meaning it can glide forward 15 kilometres for every kilometre it drops. The flight crew quickly determined that the aircraft was capable of gliding for 23 minutes and covering 91 nautical miles (169 km) from its flight level of 37,000 feet (11,000 m). At 13:44 UTC (20:44 Jakarta time), Greaves broadcast a mayday to the local air traffic control authority, stating that all four engines had failed. However, possibly because of reduced radio quality caused by the stroboscopic envelope surrounding the plane, the Jakarta Area Control misunderstood the message, interpreting the call as meaning that only engine number four had failed. After a nearby Garuda Indonesia flight relayed the message back to them, air traffic control correctly understood the urgent message. Despite the crew "squawking" the emergency transponder setting of 7700, air traffic control could not locate the 747 on their radar screens.

Owing to the high Indonesian mountains on the south coast of the island of Java, an altitude of at least 11,500 feet (3,500 m) was required to cross the coast safely. The crew decided that if the aircraft was unable to maintain altitude by the time they reached 12,000 feet (3,700 m), they would turn back out to sea and attempt to ditch into the Indian Ocean. The crew began engine restart drills despite being well outside the recommended maximum engine in-flight start envelope altitude of 28,000 feet (8,500 m). The restart attempts failed.

Despite the lack of time, Moody made an announcement to the passengers that has been described as "a masterpiece of understatement":

Ladies and gentlemen, this is your captain speaking. We have a small problem. All four engines have stopped. We are doing our damnedest to get them going again. I trust you are not in too much distress.

Because the engines are needed to pressurise the cabin, pressure within the cabin fell. This caused oxygen masks to be released from the ceiling, an automatic emergency measure to make up for the lack of air. On the flight deck, however, Greaves's mask was broken; the delivery tube had detached from the rest of the mask. Moody swiftly decided to descend at a rate of 1,800 metres (5,900 ft) per minute to an altitude where there was enough pressure in the outside atmosphere to breathe almost normally. Many passengers, fearing for their lives, wrote notes to relatives.

At 13,500 feet (4,100 m), the crew was approaching the altitude at which they would have to turn over the ocean and attempt a risky ditching. Although the crew had guidelines for the water landing procedure, no one had ever tried it in a Boeing 747. As they performed the engine restart procedure, engine number four finally started, and at 13:56 UTC (20:56 Jakarta time), Moody used its power to reduce the rate of descent. Shortly thereafter, engine three restarted, allowing him to climb slowly. Shortly after that, engines one and two successfully restarted, as well. The crew subsequently requested and expedited an increase in altitude to clear the high mountains of Indonesia.

As the aircraft approached its target altitude, the St. Elmo's fire effect on the windscreen returned. Moody throttled back, but engine number two surged again and was shut down. The crew immediately descended and held 12,000 feet (3,700 m).

As Flight 009 approached Jakarta's Halim Perdanakusuma International Airport, the crew found seeing anything through the windscreen difficult, and made the approach almost entirely on instruments, despite reports of good visibility. The crew decided to fly the instrument landing system, but the vertical guidance system was inoperative, so they were forced to fly with only the lateral guidance as the first officer monitored the airport's distance-measuring equipment (DME). He then called out how high they should be at each DME step along the final approach to the runway, creating a virtual glide slope for them to follow. Moody described it as "a bit like negotiating one's way up a badger's arse." Although the runway lights could be made out through a small strip of the windscreen, the landing lights on the aircraft seemed to be inoperable. After landing, the flight crew found taxiing impossible due to the glare from apron floodlights, which made the already sandblasted windscreen opaque. Upon disembarking, the flight engineer knelt at the bottom of the steps and kissed the ground. When Moody asked why, the engineer replied that "The Pope does it," to which Moody responded: "He flies Alitalia."

== Investigation ==
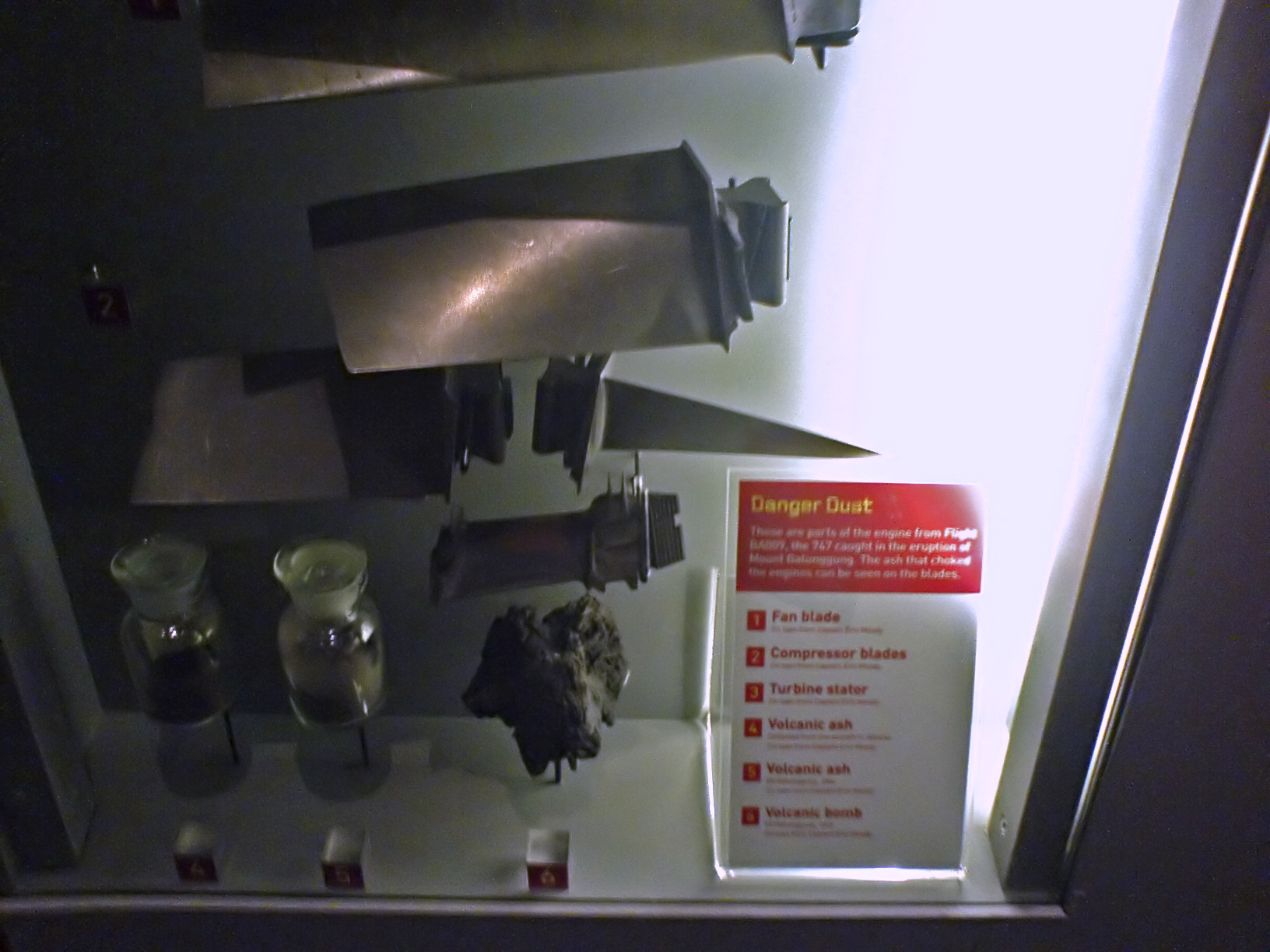
Damaged engine parts from BA009 on display at Auckland Museum

Postflight investigation revealed that City of Edinburgh's problems had been caused by flying through a cloud of volcanic ash from the eruption of Mount Galunggung. Because the ash cloud was dry, it did not appear on the weather radar, which was designed to detect the moisture in clouds. The dust in the cloud deprived the engines of sufficient oxygen from the atmosphere to maintain combustion, sandblasted the windscreen and landing-light covers, and clogged the engines. As the ash entered the engines, it melted in the combustion chambers and adhered to the inside of the power plant. As the engine cooled from inactivity, and as the aircraft descended out of the ash cloud, the molten ash solidified enough and broke off for air to again flow smoothly through the engine, allowing a successful restart. The engines had enough electrical power to crank, ignite, and restart because one generator and the on-board batteries were still operating.

== Aftermath ==
Engines one, two, and three were replaced at Jakarta, as was the windscreen, and the fuel tanks were cleared of the ash that had entered them through the pressurisation ducts, badly contaminating the fuel. After the aircraft was ferried back to London, engine number four was replaced and major work was undertaken to return the 747 to service.

Following its emergency landing at Halim Airport in Jakarta, the crew and passengers of British Airways Flight 009 stayed for several days in Jakarta. Some stayed at the Sahid Jaya Hotel and some stayed at the Sari Pan Pacific Hotel, while the first class passengers were flown to Perth in a UTA Airlines flight. While staying in Jakarta, the passengers and crew of British Airways Flight 009 got the chance to have a tour of the city and visited Taman Mini Indonesia Indah. After two days in Jakarta, the passengers and crew of British Airways Flight 009 were flown by another British Airways flight to Perth, Australia and Auckland, New Zealand.

Although the airspace around Mount Galunggung was closed temporarily after the accident, it was reopened days later. Only after a Singapore Airlines 747 was forced to shut down three of its engines while it was flying through the same area 19 days later, on 13 July, would Indonesian authorities close the airspace permanently and reroute airways to avoid the area. A watch was set up to monitor clouds of ash. Flight 009 was not the first encounter with that eruption; a Garuda Indonesian Airways Douglas DC-9 had encountered ash on 5 April 1982.

The crew received various awards, including the Queen's Commendation for Valuable Service in the Air for Moody, and medals from the British Airline Pilots' Association. G-BDXH's engineless flight entered the Guinness Book of Records as the longest glide in a non-purpose-built aircraft (this record has also been held by Air Canada Flight 143 in 1983 and Air Transat Flight 236 in 2001).

One of the passengers, Betty Tootell, wrote a book about the accident, All Four Engines Have Failed, and had managed to trace some 200 of the 247 passengers on the flight. In 1993, Tootell married fellow passenger James Ferguson, who had been seated in the row in front of her. She later noted: "The 28th December 2006 marks the start of our 14th year of honeymoon, and on the 24th June 2007, many passengers and crew will no doubt gather to celebrate the 25th anniversary of our mid-air adventure." Ferguson died in 2015.

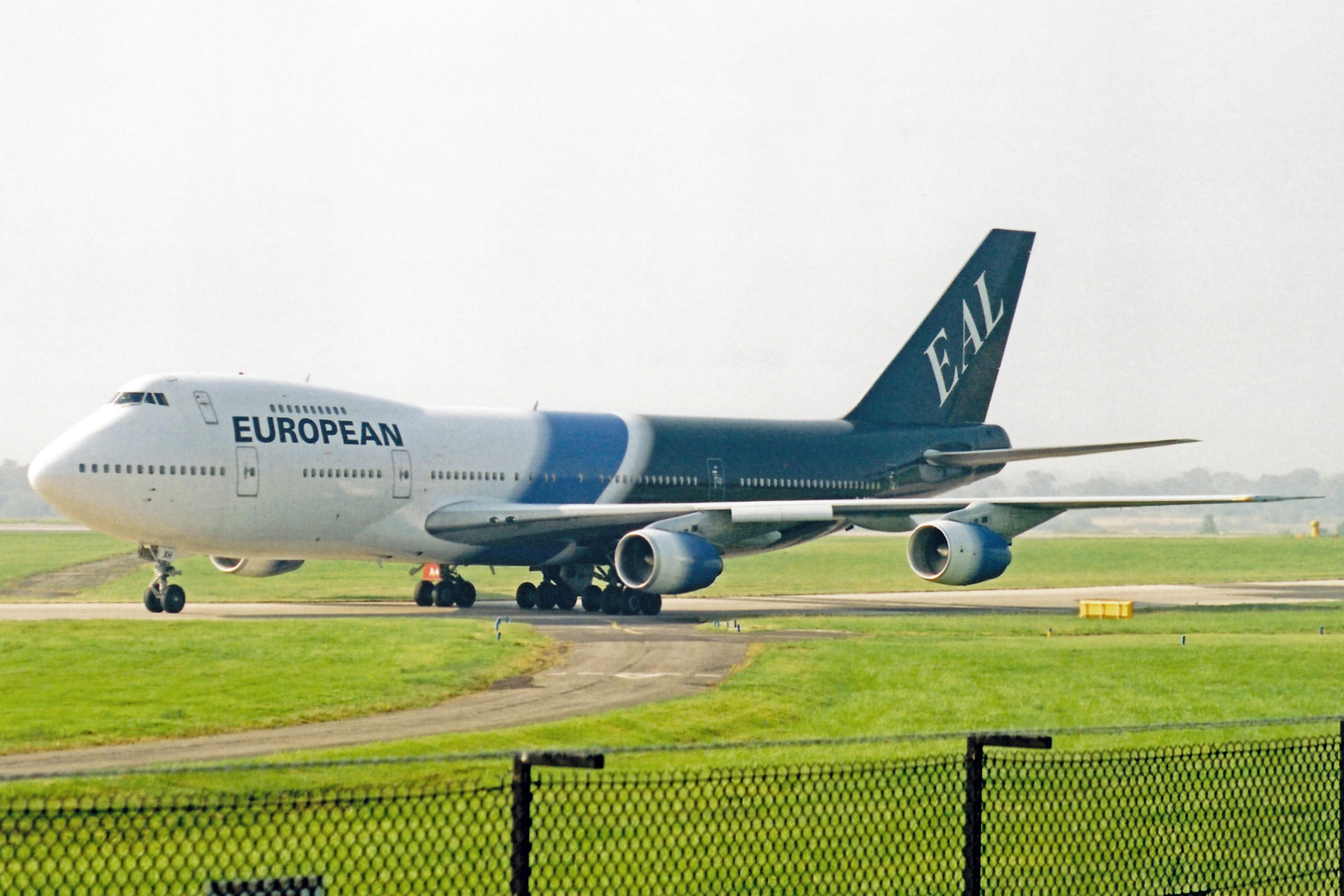
G-BDXH, operating for European Aviation Air Charter in August 2003, six months before it was withdrawn from use

Following the incident, Captain Moody founded the Galunggung Gliding Club, which hosted annual reunions for the passengers and crew on board Flight 009. He stayed with British Airways for decades, retiring in 1996 with more than 17,000 flight hours. The airline gave him the yoke from City of Edinburgh as a memento. Moody died on 18 March 2024 at the age of 82.

British Airways continued to operate the Flight 009 route from London Heathrow to Sydney, but in March 2012, the route was curtailed to Bangkok until March 2020, then it was terminated permanently. British Airways returned to Bangkok in October 2024 after a four-year hiatus; however, the route now operates from London Gatwick instead.

The aircraft involved, G-BDXH, named City of Edinburgh, later renamed City of Elgin, which was delivered to British Airways in March 1979, was repaired and continued to fly for British Airways after the accident, before being sold to European Aviation Air Charter in January 2002. The aircraft was taken out of service in February 2004, and in July 2009, the then-30-year-old aircraft was broken up at a breaking facility at Bournemouth Airport. The cockpit has been restored and is on display at the South Wales Aviation Museum.

== In popular culture ==
The Discovery Channel Canada / National Geographic TV series Mayday featured Flight 009 in a 2007 episode titled "Falling From the Sky" which featured interviews with the flight crew and passengers, and a dramatisation of the flight.

During an episode of the BBC comedy television panel show QI XL (episode 11 of Series U, "Underthings"), broadcast in 2024, Captain Moody, who was sitting in the audience, was briefly interviewed when a question was asked about the incident.

== See also ==
- Singapore Airlines Flight 21A – a similar incident that occurred to a Boeing 747 less than a month later in the same area
- KLM Flight 867 – a nearly identical incident occurred to a Boeing 747 in Alaska in 1989
- List of airline flights that required gliding
- Volcanic ash and aviation safety
