= KLM Flight 867 =

1989 aircraft incident

Coordinates: 61.1717°N 149.9867°W

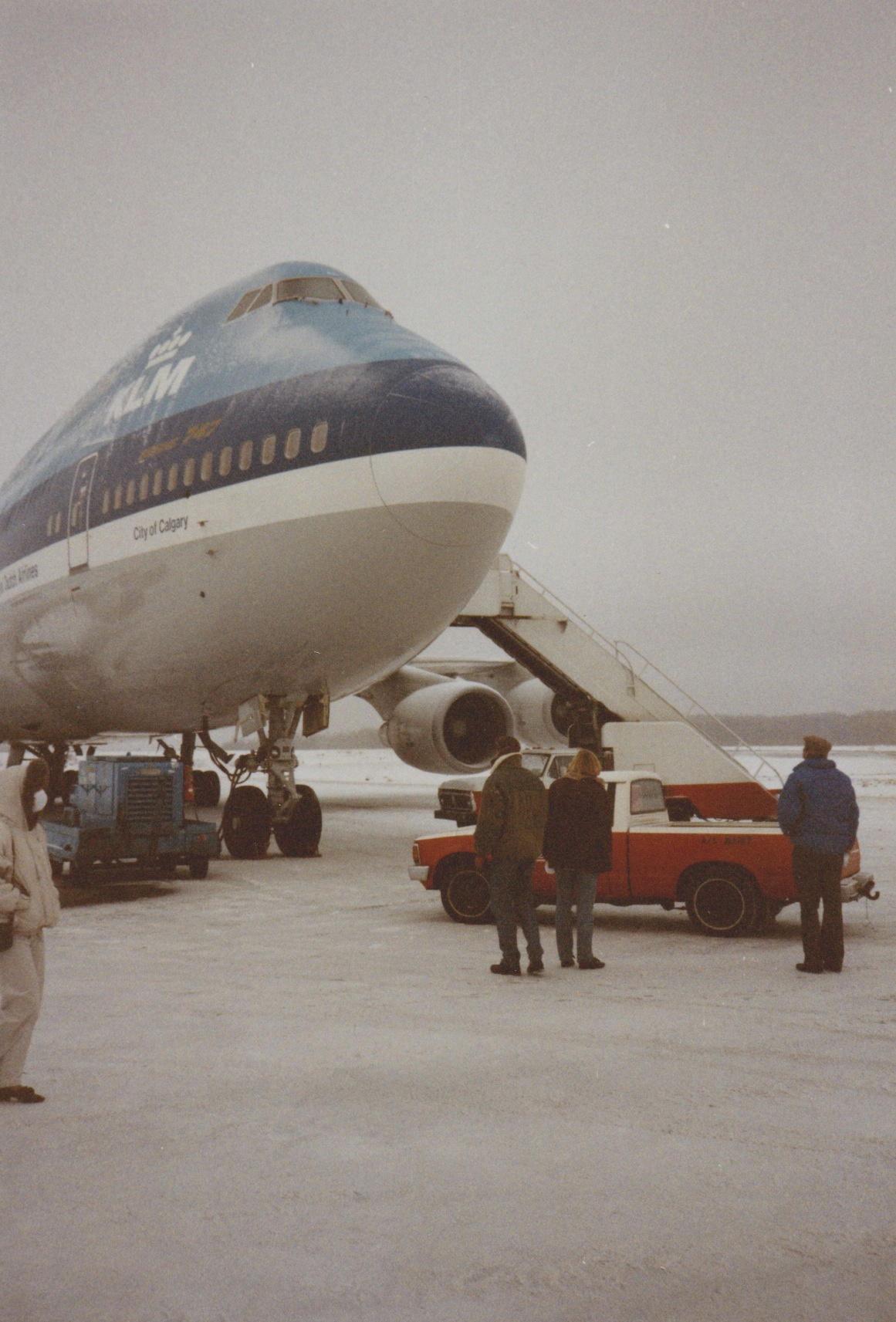
- The cockpit crew inspects the damage caused to PH-BFC by the ash cloud in Anchorage the day after the incident

Incident
- Date: 15 December 1989
- Summary: Quadruple engine failure due to blockage by volcanic ash
- Site: Over Mount Redoubt, Anchorage, Alaska

Aircraft
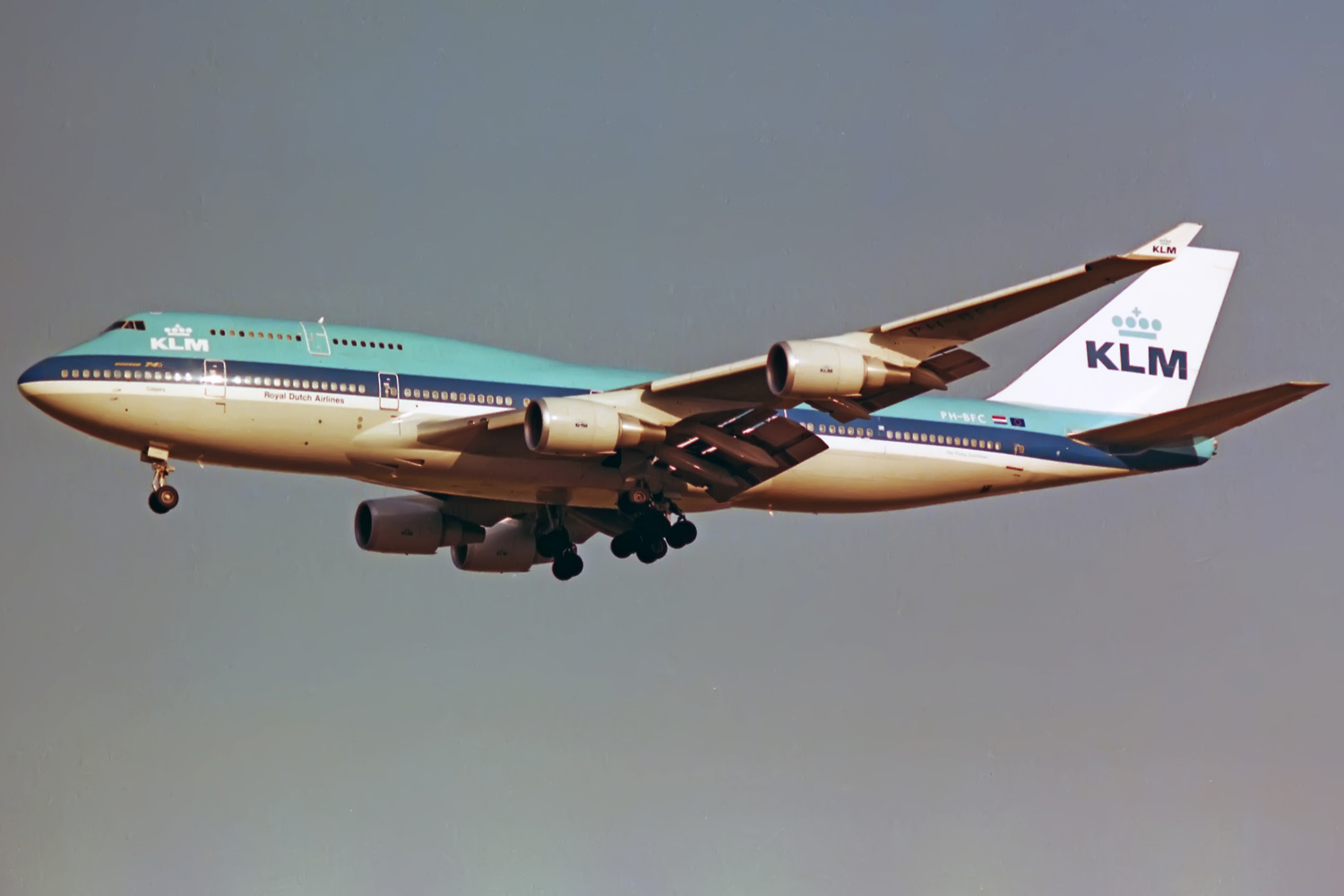
- PH-BFC, the aircraft involved in the incident, seen in 1992
- Aircraft type: Boeing 747-406M
- Aircraft name: City of Calgary
- Operator: KLM
- IATA flight No.: KL867
- ICAO flight No.: KLM867
- Call sign: KLM 867
- Registration: PH-BFC
- Flight origin: Amsterdam Airport Schiphol, Amsterdam, Netherlands
- Stopover: Anchorage International Airport, Anchorage, Alaska, United States
- Destination: Narita International Airport, Tokyo, Japan
- Occupants: 245
- Passengers: 231
- Crew: 14
- Fatalities: 0
- Injuries: 0
- Survivors: 245

On 15 December 1989, KLM Flight 867, en route from Amsterdam to Narita International Airport, Tokyo, was forced to make an emergency landing at Anchorage International Airport, Alaska, when all four engines failed. The Boeing 747-406M, less than six months old at the time, flew through a thick cloud of volcanic ash from Mount Redoubt, which had erupted the day before.

== Aircraft ==
The aircraft involved was a Boeing 747-406M, serial number 23982, and registered as PH-BFC. It was, at the time of the incident, almost six months old. The aircraft was equipped with four General Electric CF6-80C2B1F engines.

== Engine failure ==
All four engines failed, leaving only critical systems on backup electrical power. One report assigned the engine shutdown to the conversion of the ash into a glass coating inside the engines that fooled the engine temperature sensors and led to an auto-shutdown of all four engines.

When all four main generators shut off due to the failure of all the engines, a momentary power interruption occurred when the flight instruments transferred to standby power. Standby power on the 747-400 is provided by two batteries and inverters. The captain performed the engine restart procedure, which failed on the first few attempts, and repeated it until restart was achieved. On some of the attempts, as one or more (but not all) engines started to operate, the main generator switched back on. This switching on and off caused repeated power transfer interruptions to the flight instruments. The temporary blanking of the instruments gave the appearance that standby power had failed. These power transfers were later verified from the flight data recorder.

== Recovery and aftermath ==
After descending more than 14,000 feet (4,300 m), the crew was able to restart two of the four engines and safely landed the plane. In this case, the ash caused more than US$80 million in damage to the aircraft, requiring all four engines to be replaced, but there were no human deaths and no one was injured. A shipment of 25 African birds, two genets, and 25 tortoises aboard the plane was diverted to an Anchorage warehouse, where eight birds and three tortoises died before the mislabeled shipment was discovered.

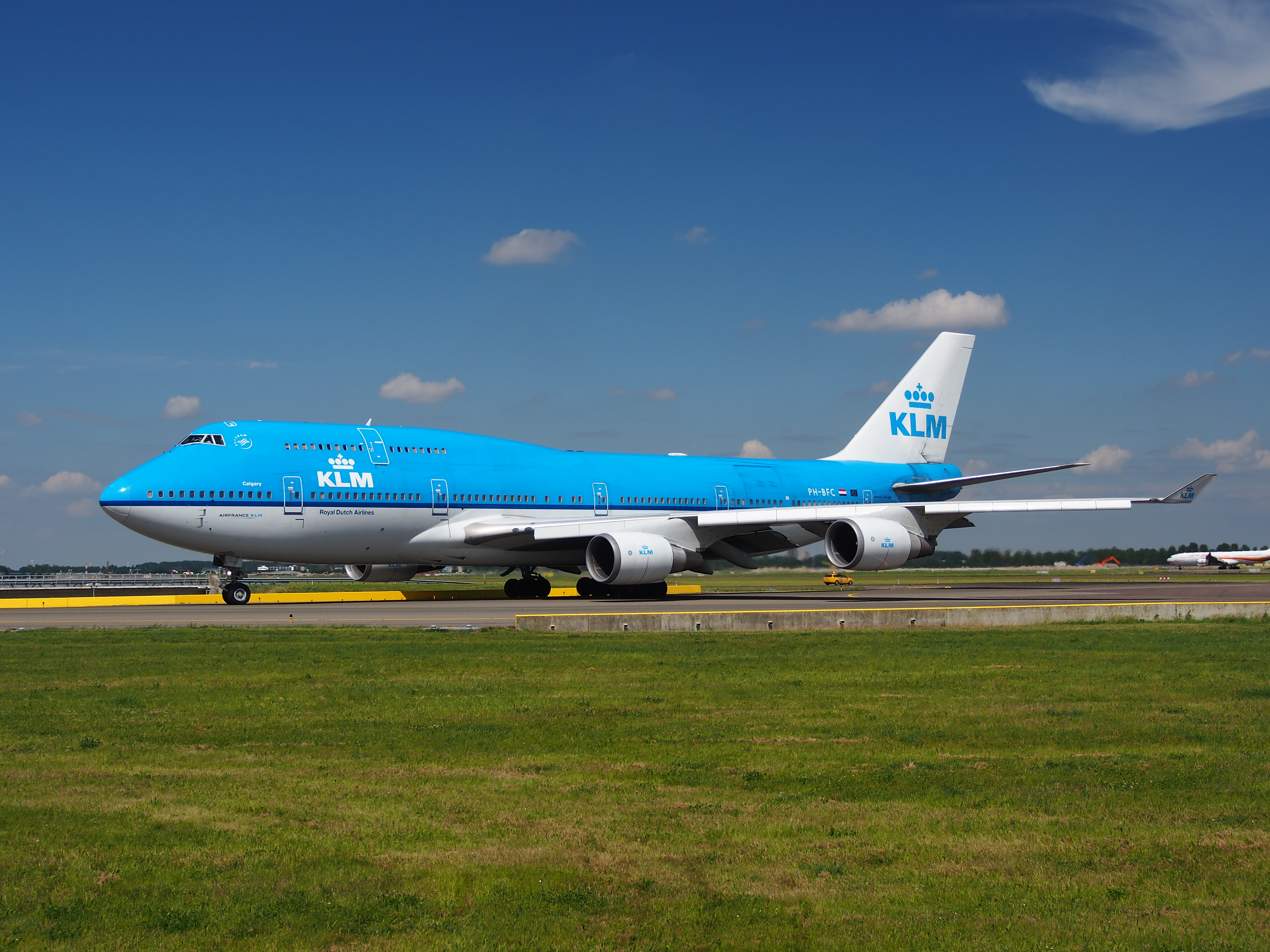
PH-BFC in 2014, just years before it was withdrawn from service

The aircraft, PH-BFC, remained in service with KLM until its retirement from the fleet on 14 March 2018. From 1995 to 2012, it was part of the "KLM Asia" fleet.

== See also ==
- British Airways Flight 009 – a nearly identical incident which occurred over Indonesia on 24 June 1982.
- Singapore Airlines Flight 21A – a similar incident which also occurred over Indonesia on 13 July 1982.
- List of airline flights that required gliding
- Ring of Fire
- Volcanic ash and aviation safety
