= Dalvíkurbyggð =

- Municipality
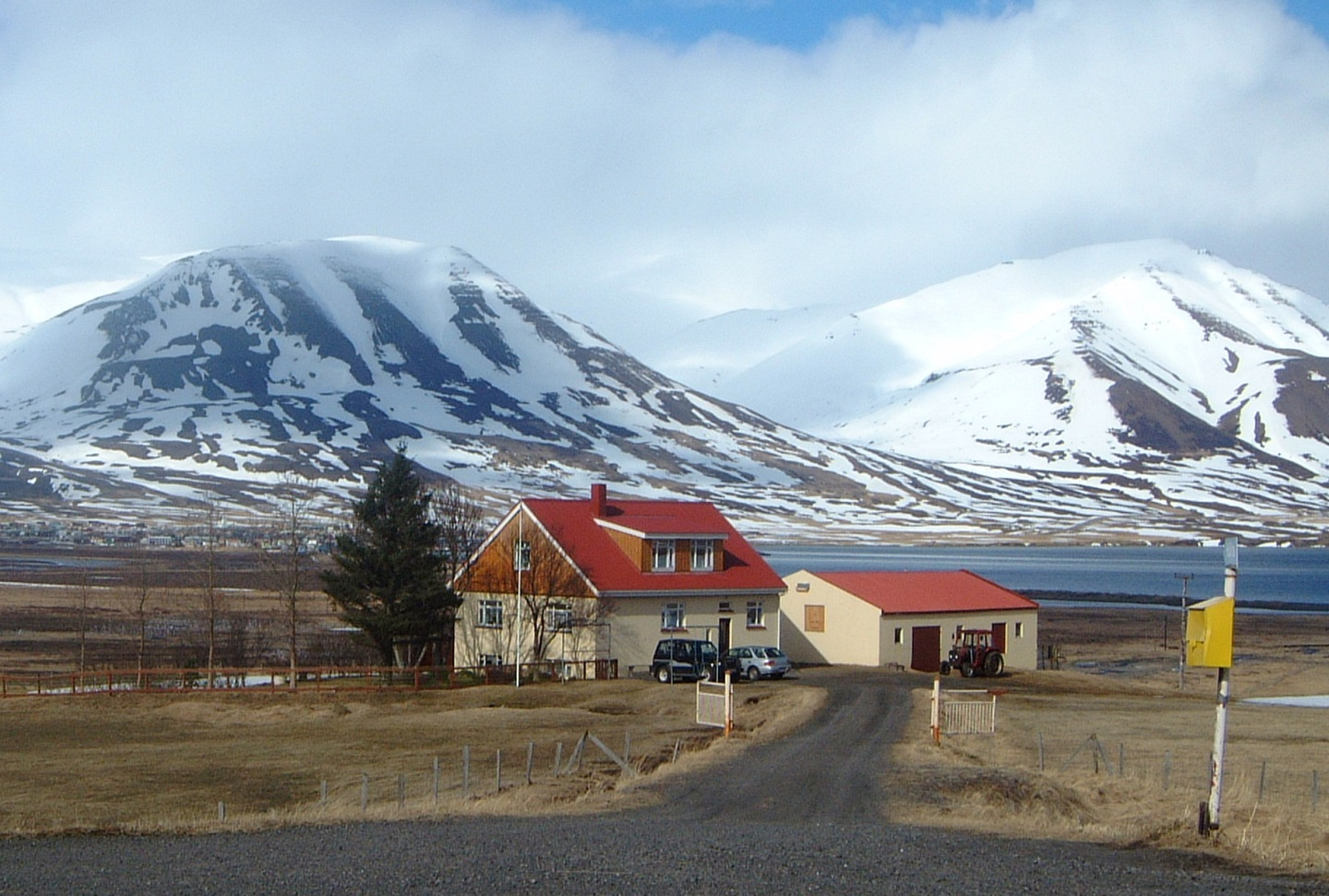
- Skyline of Dalvíkurbyggð

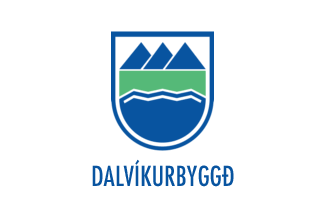
- Flag

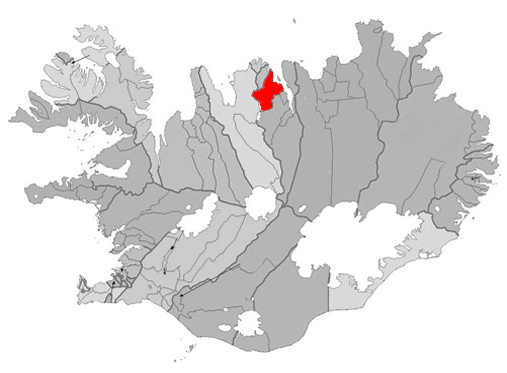
- Location of Dalvíkurbyggð

- Location within Iceland
- Coordinates: 65°58′N 18°32′W
- Country: Iceland
- Region: Northeastern Region
- Constituency: Northeast Constituency

Government
  - Manager: Bjarni Th. Bjarnason

Area
  - Total: 598 km^{2} (231 sq mi)

Population
  - Total: 1,867
  - Density: 3.12/km^{2} (8.1/sq mi)
- Postal code(s): 620, 621
- Municipal number: 6400
- Website: dalvikurbyggd.is

Dalvíkurbyggð (Icelandic pronunciation: [ˈtaːl.ˌviː.kʏr.ˌpɪɣθ], regionally also [-viː.kʰʏr-]) is a small municipality in northern Iceland. Dalvíkurbyggð is on Tröllaskagi and west of Eyjafjörður.

== History ==
The municipality of Dalvíkurbyggð was formed in 1998 by the merger of three districts of outer Eyjafjörður: the town of Dalvík and the rural districts of Svarfaðardalur and Árskógur [ˈaur.skouː.(ɣ)ʏr̥]. The logo of Dalvíkurbyggð shows three mountains, signifying the joining of the three communities.

== Transportation ==
The main route in Dalvíkurbyggð is the one numbered 82. Dalvík harbor is a regional commercial port for import and fishing. The ferry Sæfari, which sails from Dalvík, serves the island of Grímsey, Iceland's northernmost community, which lies on the Arctic Circle.

== Economy ==
The local economy is based upon fisheries and fish processing, in addition to various industrial and food enterprises, services, and increasingly hi tech industry. Dalvík is also a tourist destination for boat trips in whale watching and heli skiing.

== Twin towns – sister cities ==
Dalvíkurbyggð is twinned with:

- Hamar, Norway
- Ittoqqortoormiit, Greenland
- Lund, Sweden
- Porvoo, Finland
- Viborg, Denmark

== Notable natives ==
- Kristján Eldjárn - President of Iceland 1968 - 1980
- Björgvin Björgvinsson - alpine skier, has competed in FIS World Cup and Olympic Games.
- Daníel Hilmarsson - alpine skier, won multiple national championships and participated in Olympic Games in Calgary.
- Heiðar Helguson - Professional footballer with English Football League Championship team Queens Park Rangers.
- Freymóður Jóhannsson - Painter and song composer.
- Friðrik Ómar - Eurovision Song Contest 2008, member in the Icelandic group Euroband.
- Gunnlaugur Lárusson - Electric guitarist and a founding member of the Icelandic band Brain Police.
- Þórarinn Eldjárn, - author
- Magni Þór Óskarsson - Winner of Gettu Betur in 2006 with Menntaskólinn á Akureyri
- Johann K. Petursson - "The Viking Giant."
- Eythor Ingi - "Singer, songwriter, actor."

== See also ==
- Sæplast
- Snorrason Holdings
