= Strýtan vent field =

Strýtan Vent Field
- Location within Earth
- Location: Atlantic Ocean
- Coordinates: 65°49′18″N 18°07′24″W
- Max. elevation: −70 metres (−230 ft)
- Min. elevation: −16 metres (−52 ft)

The Strýtan vent field is a hydrothermal vent field located in the northern Atlantic Ocean at a depth of 16–70 metres (52–230 ft). It is located within Iceland's northern fjord Eyjafördur near Akureyri. As of 2024, it is the only known alkaline hydrothermal vent field hosted on basalt rock.

It is a popular site for divers.

== History ==
The oldest reports of the Strýtan vent field date back hundreds of years to fishermen using dive weights. However, the Icelandic Coast Guard did not detect the vent chimneys and declared them as non-existent in 1987. Only in 1997 was the Strýtan vent field reported by divers Erlendur Bogason and Árni Halldósson and identified as a real geologic feature. It was also explored by GEOMAR in 1997, using the HOV JAGO, a German research submersible.

In 2001, Strýtan was designated as a protected Icelandic preserve.

== Geology and location ==
Strýtan is in the vicinity of the Dalvík Lineament, which connects to the Eyjafjarðaráll Rift which extends to the Kolbeinsey Ridge. Strýtan is among the shallowest vent fields known and is among the few coastal hydrothermal systems known.

The vent field is composed of three primary venting sites. Big Strýtan, Arnarnesstrýtur (sometimes referred to as Little Strýtan), and Hrisey. The Big Strýtan cone is composed predominantly of anhydrite and saponite, with some chimneys as tall as 55 metres (180 ft). Samples from the site indicate an extensive series of mineral phases within the mounds with fibrous, crystalline minerals establishing pore spaces for fluids to travel through.

== Geochemistry ==
Unlike Lost City, another alkaline field to the south in the Atlantic, Strýtan is hosted on 6-12 MA Mid-ocean ridge basalts and recharge is primarily from freshwater contributions of terrestrial origin, with fluid stable isotopes (δ^{18}O, δ^{2}H) and radiocarbon matching that of terrestrial reservoirs.

Venting fluids are moderate at a temperature of ~76 °C (169 °F) and are highly alkaline at a pH of about 10.2. Venting is most profuse at Big Strýtan, where the discharge rate is estimated at 50 meters per second. Silica, magnesium, calcium, and oxygen are abundant in venting fluids and salinity is 0.5 - 14% of that of seawater. Silicon dioxide concentrations are elevated relative to seawater and consume magnesium in the precipitation of tall saponite chimneys.

A 2024 study found brucite within the chimneys at Strýtan, suggesting the possibility of ferrobrucite (containing iron) and therefore prebiotic chemistry reactions like those seen at Lost City.

== Biology ==
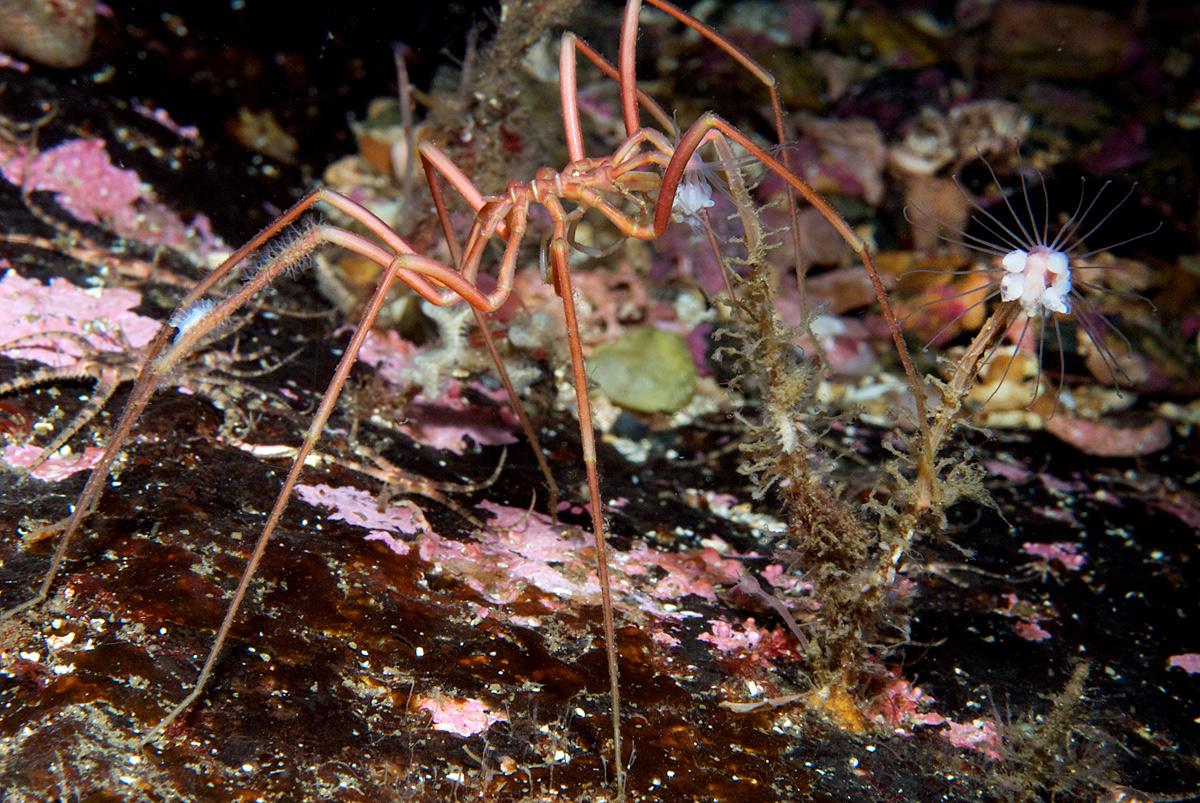
Sea spider grazing on a hydroid in a Norwegian fjord.

Strýtan has an abundance of mussels, bryozoans, sponges, hydroids, brittlestars, and polychete worms. Metridium anemones, nudibranchs, and sea spiders have also been reported.

Microbial communities of the vent field are structured by mixing of hydrothermal fluids and background, oxygenated seawater within vent chimneys. The fluids themselves include species of Flavobacterium, Pseudoalteromonas, Psychrobacter, Acinetobacter, and Pseudomonas. Metabolic processes indicate abundant hydrogen and sulfur chemistry, with oxygen, sulfate, and nitrate as major electron acceptors.

== See also ==
- Lost City Hydrothermal Field
- Hydrothermal vents
