= ROV PHOCA =

Remotely operated underwater vehicle of the COMANCHE type

ROV PHOCA is a remotely operated underwater vehicle of the COMANCHE type. It was built by sub-Atlantic, Aberdeen, Scotland and is owned by the GEOMAR - Helmholtz Centre for Ocean Research Kiel. Its smaller size compared to the ROV KIEL 6000 and therefore its deploy ability from medium-sized research vessels makes it a complement to the QUEST type ROV. It can dive up to 3000m (9842.52 feet) and was designed as a Work-Class- and Intervention-ROV.

It is characterized by these features:

- 2 manipulators facilitate different sampling procedures
- Digital video cameras on pan-&-tilt units are used as survey and mapping devices
- It is fitted with the following auto-functions: depth, heading and altitude
- The digital telemetry system SubCanTM provides real time data transmission
- A payload of up to 100 kg allows the integration of different additional scientific equipment
- ROV PHOCA is deployed in the so-called live-boating mode, i.e. it is directly connected to the respective vessel via a steel armoured optical fiber cable

ROV PHOCA's main employment will be the installation and maintenance of the deep sea observatory MoLab, but also within other multi-disciplinary projects such as projects by the Cluster of Excellence "The Future Ocean".

== Technical specifications ==
Type:	Comanche 21, electric "Workclass" ROV (sub-Atlantic)
Working Depth:	up to 3000 m
Measurements:	length: 2,1 m, width: 1,3 m, height: 1,35 m
Weight:	in air: 1500 kg in water: buoyant
Propulsion:	7 electrical DC propeller SPE-250
Speed:	max. 2,5 Knots
Station Keep (dP):	± 0,5 m
Auto Heading:	± 5°
Deep Sea Cable:	2700 m @ 19 mm, 1,3 t/km in air = 3,5 t, 1 t/km in water= 2,7 t in max. water depth; 3 high-voltage conductors @ 4 mm²; 3 LWL (single mode)
Digital Telemetrie:	SubCanTM
Scientific Payload:	up to 100 kg
Hydraulics:	Pump 15 kW with 39 lpm @ 207 bar to power two manipulators.
Transport:	2 1/2 20'-ISO-Container. Total weight 30 t.
