= Hörgársveit =

- Municipality
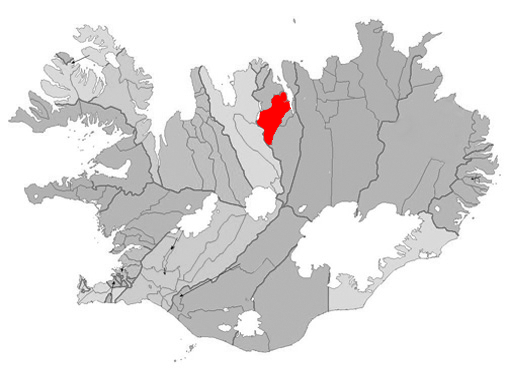
- Location of Hörgársveit

- Location within Iceland
- Coordinates: 65.457247°N 18.8277973°W
- Country: Iceland
- Region: Northeastern Region
- Constituency: Northeast Constituency

Government
  - Manager: Snorri Finnlaugsson

Area
  - Total: 893 km^{2} (345 sq mi)

Population
  - Total: 802
  - Density: 0.63/km^{2} (1.6/sq mi)
- Municipal number: 6515
- Website: horgarsveit.is

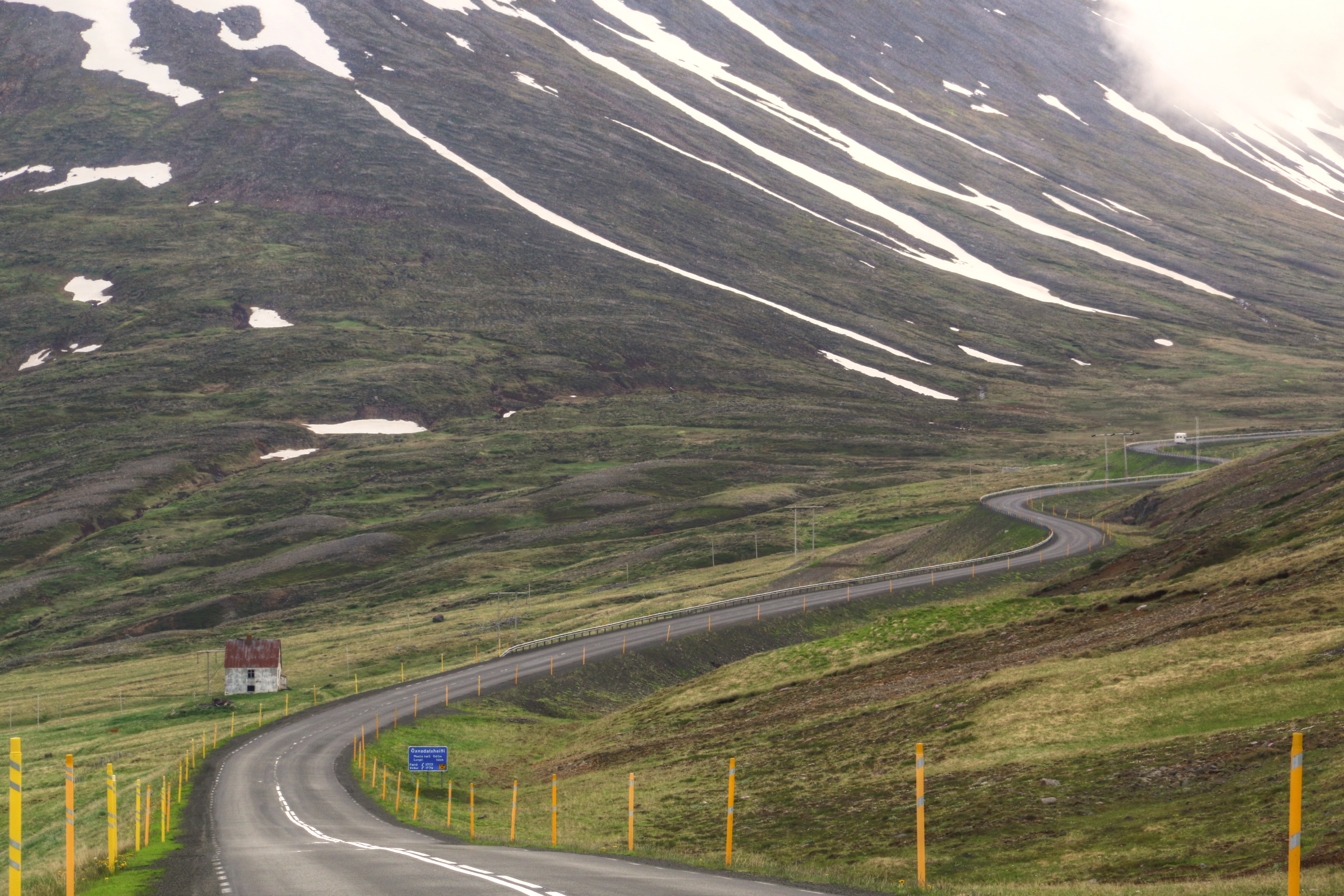
National Road No. 1, Öxnadalsheiði, Hörgársveit

Hörgársveit (Icelandic pronunciation: [ˈhœrkˌaurˌsveiːt]) is a municipality located in north-central Iceland, in Northeastern Region. Its seat is the village of Lónsbakki [ˈlounsˌpahcɪ].

== History ==
The former municipality of Hörgárbyggð [ˈhœrkˌaurˌpɪɣθ] was formed on 1 January 2001 by the union of the municipalities of Skriða [ˈskrɪːða] (Skriðuhreppur [ˈskrɪːðʏˌr̥ɛhpʏr̥]), Öxnadalur [ˈœkstnaˌtaːlʏr̥] (Öxnadalshreppur [ˈœkstnaˌtalsˌr̥ɛhpʏr̥]) and Glæsibær [ˈklaiːsɪˌpaiːr̥] (Glæsibæjarhreppur [ˈklaiːsɪˌpaiːjar̥ˌr̥ɛhpʏr̥]). In 2010 Hörgárbyggð merged with the municipality of Arnarnes [ˈa(r)tnarˌnɛːs] (Arnarneshreppur [ˈa(r)tnarˌnɛsˌr̥ɛhpʏr̥] ) to form the current municipality of Hörgársveit.

== Geography ==
Located on the Eyjafjörður, to the north of Akureyri, Hörgársveit is made up of several villages, principally Þelamörk [ˈθɛːlaˌmœr̥k], Lónsbakki (115 inhabitants) and Hjalteyri (37 inhabitants), the seat of the former municipality of Arnarnes.
