= Kerling (Iceland) =

Mountain in Iceland

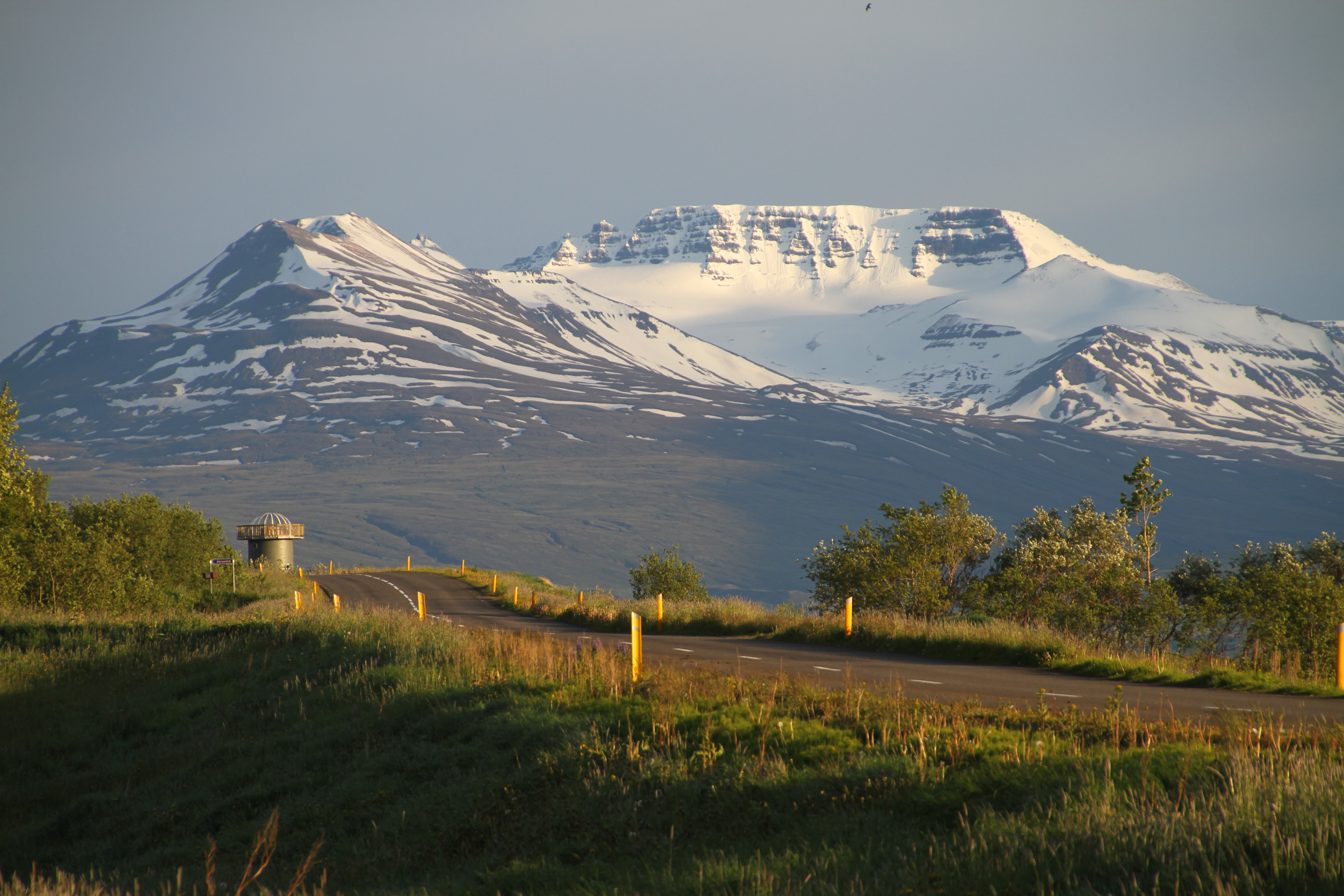

Highest point
- Elevation: 1,536 m (5,039 ft)
- Prominence: 756 m (2,480 ft)
- Listing: Mountains of Iceland
- Coordinates: 65°33′26″N 18°15′17″W

Geography
- Location within Iceland
- Country: Iceland
- Region: Northeastern

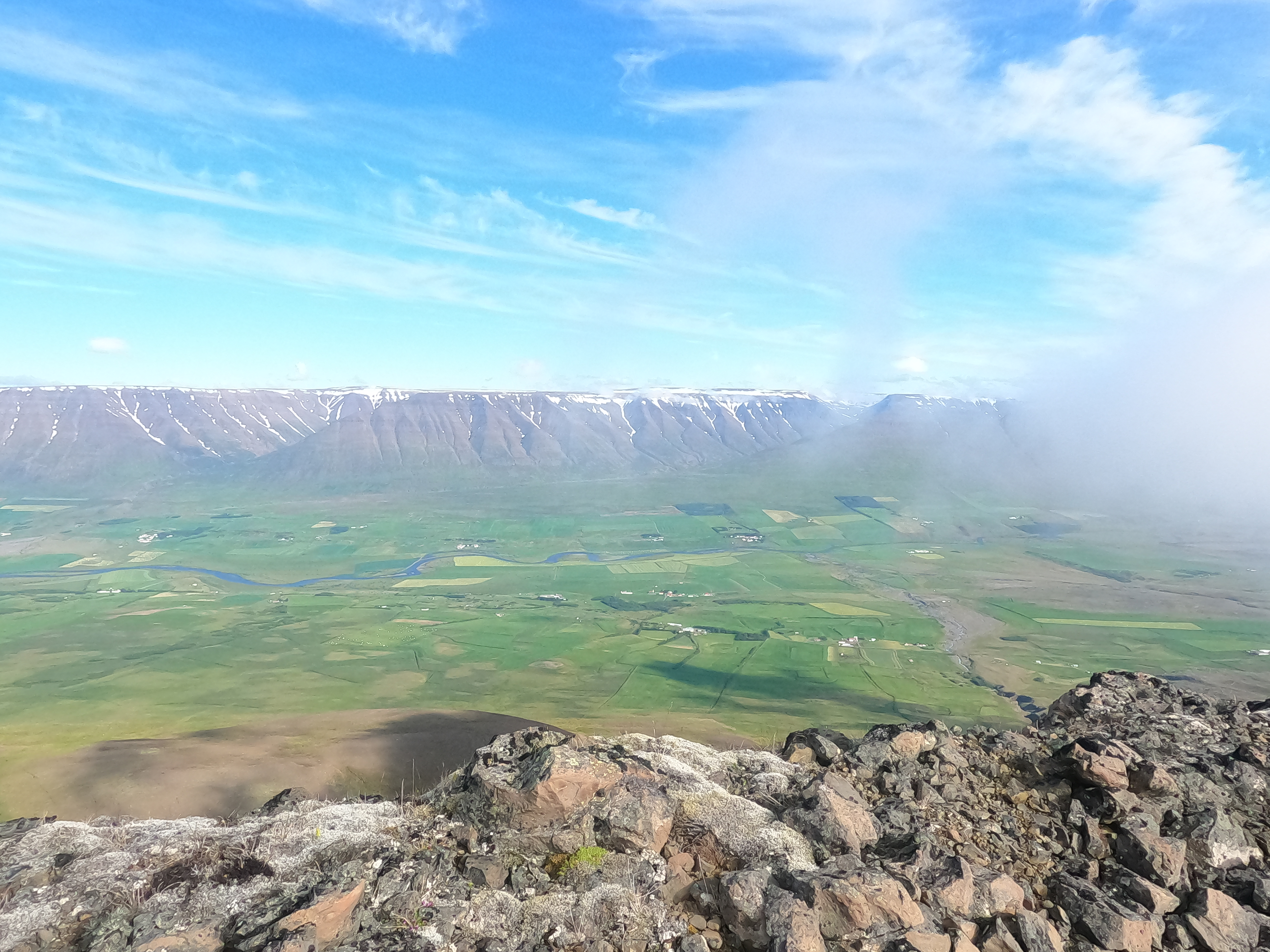
View of the valley to the east of Kerling (Eyjafjarðarsveit municipality)

Mount Kerling (Icelandic pronunciation: [ˈcʰɛ(r)tliŋk], "Old Hag") is the highest mountain (1536 m) in the District of Eyjafjarðarsveit, in northern Iceland. It is only 13 km SSW of Akureyri. Its structure is mainly basaltic rock, but the uppermost part is rhyolite, which extends to Súlur mountain nearby and all the way around the head of the Glerárdalur valley to the lower slopes of Vindheimajökull [ˈvɪntˌheiːmaˌjœːkʏtl̥] on the western side of the valley. It is considered an easy climb, with excellent panoramic views on a fine day.
