= Snorrason =

Snorrason may refer to:

- Ólafur Páll Snorrason (born 1982), Icelandic international footballer who plays club football as a striker
- Oddr Snorrason, Latin royal biography attributed to a 12th-century Icelandic Benedictine monk at the Thingeyrar Monastery (Þingeyrarklaustur)
- Snorrason Holdings, Icelandic holding company with primary interests in online payment processing
- Snorri Snorrason (born 1977), Icelandic singer who rose to popularity after winning Idol Stjörnuleit 3, the Icelandic version of Pop Idol
