= Hauganes =

- Village
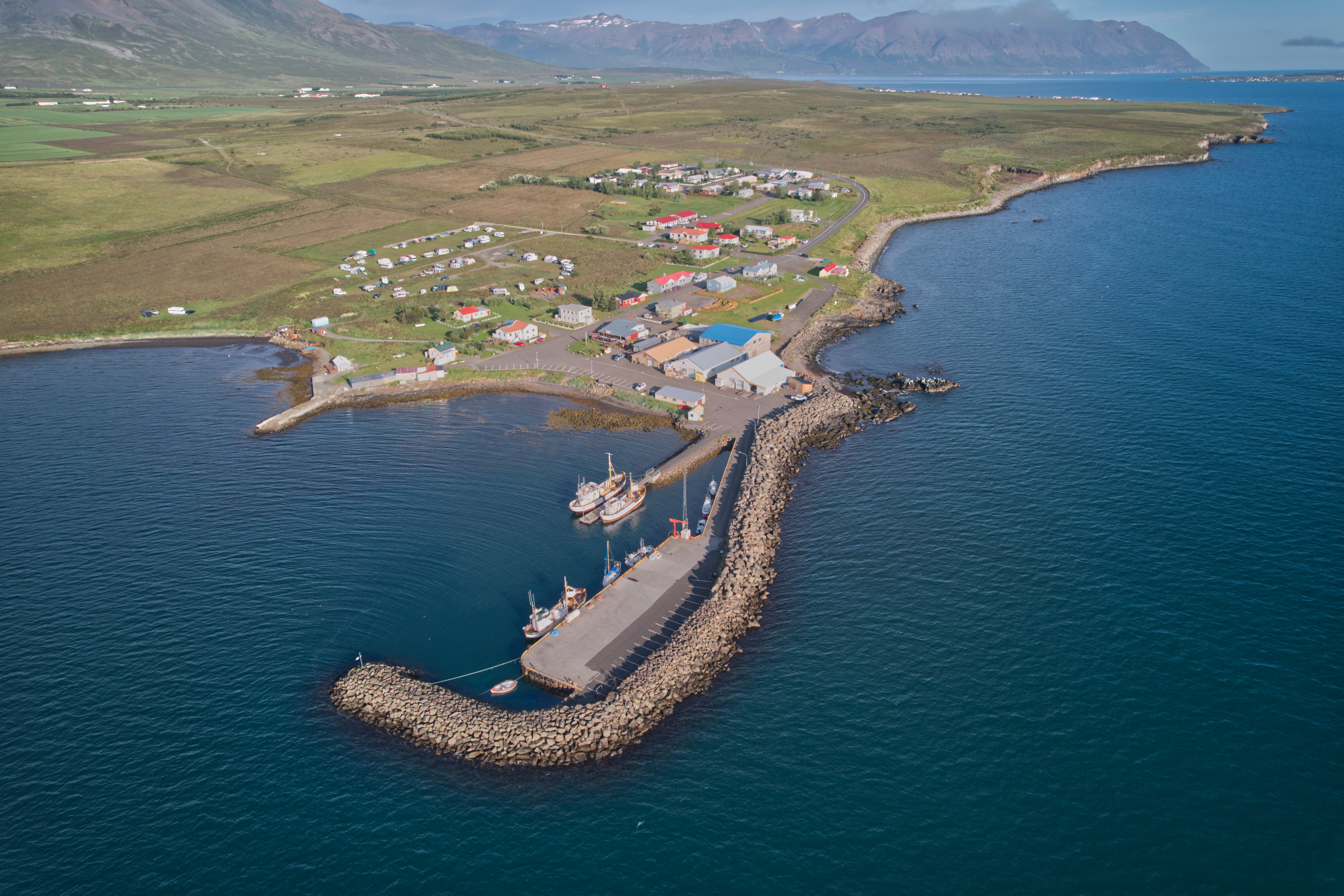

- Location of Hauganes in Iceland
- Coordinates: 65°55′N 18°18′W
- Country: Iceland
- Constituency: Northeast Constituency
- Region: Northeastern Region
- Municipality: Dalvíkurbyggð

Population
  - Total: 137
- Time zone: UTC+0 (GMT)

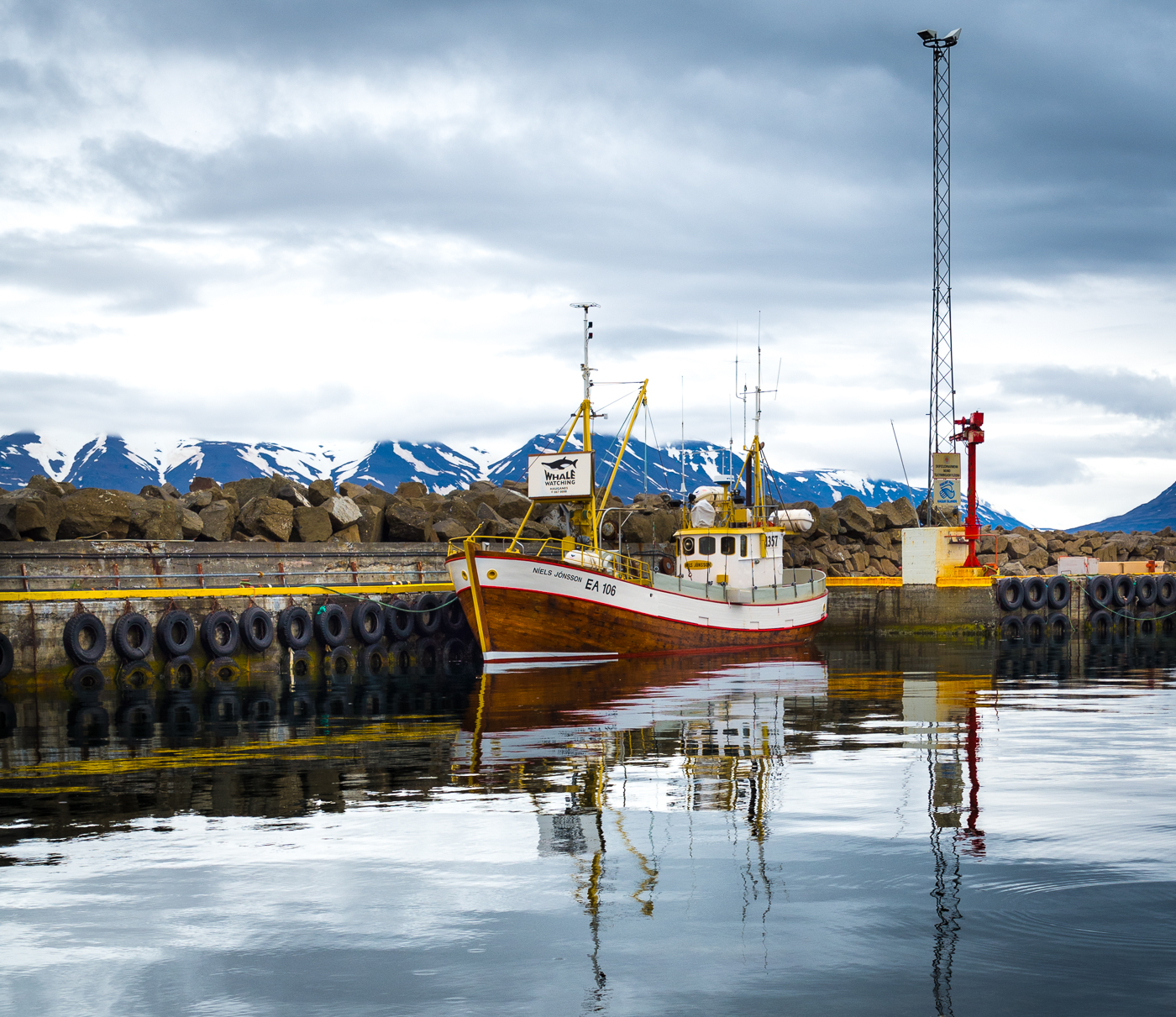
The whale watching vessel Níels Jónsson lies tied to the pier at Hauganes harbour

Hauganes (Icelandic pronunciation: [ˈhœyːɣaˌnɛːs]) is a village located in Eyjafjörður in northern Iceland. Hauganes has about 137 inhabitants.

The word Hauganes means "mound peninsula". Fishing is an important industry in the village. Salted fish is produced there, the factory also runs a seafood restaurant in the summer months and operates pay-what-you-want hot tubs at the coast.

Whales and seals may be viewed at a number of spots. It is possible to visit the offshore islands of Hrísey and Grímsey.
