= Tröllaskagi =

Mountainous peninsula in northern Iceland

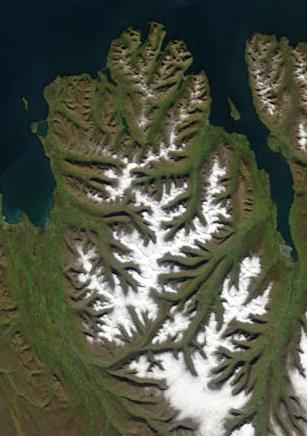
- Satellite image of Tröllaskagi

- Location within Iceland

Geography
- Location: Iceland
- Coordinates: 65°56′59″N 18°54′25″W
- Adjacent to: Eyjafjörður, Skagafjörður
- Highest point: Kerling (1,538 m)

Tröllaskagi (Icelandic pronunciation: [ˈtʰrœtlaˌskaijɪ]) is a peninsula in northern Iceland on the Greenland Sea, between the fjords of Eyjafjörður and Skagafjörður. The peninsula is mountainous, with several peaks reaching over 1,000 meters above sea level, the tallest being Kerling (1,538 m). It is the part of Iceland with the highest elevation outside the central highlands.

The peninsula is cut by several deep valleys that were carved by glaciers during the glacial periods of the last Ice age and later by the rivers that now flow down those valleys. A few permanent glacial ice caps still exist in central Tröllaskagi, but they are all rather small.

Human settlement is only extant in the relatively flat lowlands along the coast and in the valleys, but these lowlands are densely populated by Icelandic standards with important agricultural regions and a few towns and villages that mostly base their livelihood on fisheries. Those settlements are (clockwise around the peninsula beginning in Skagafjörður): Hofsós, Hólar, Siglufjörður, Ólafsfjörður, Dalvík, Árskógssandur [ˈaurˌskouksˌsantʏr̥], Hauganes, Hjalteyri, Hrafnagil and the largest being Akureyri.

== Öxnadalsheiði ==
The Ring Road runs through Tröllaskagi between Skagafjörður and Eyjafjörður through a mountain pass called Öxnadalsheiði [ˈœkstnaˌtalsˌheiːðɪ] where the road reaches a maximum elevation of 540 meters above sea level, which can sometimes pose a problem during wintertime. Several different tunneling projects have been suggested as a way to bypass Öxnadalsheiði.

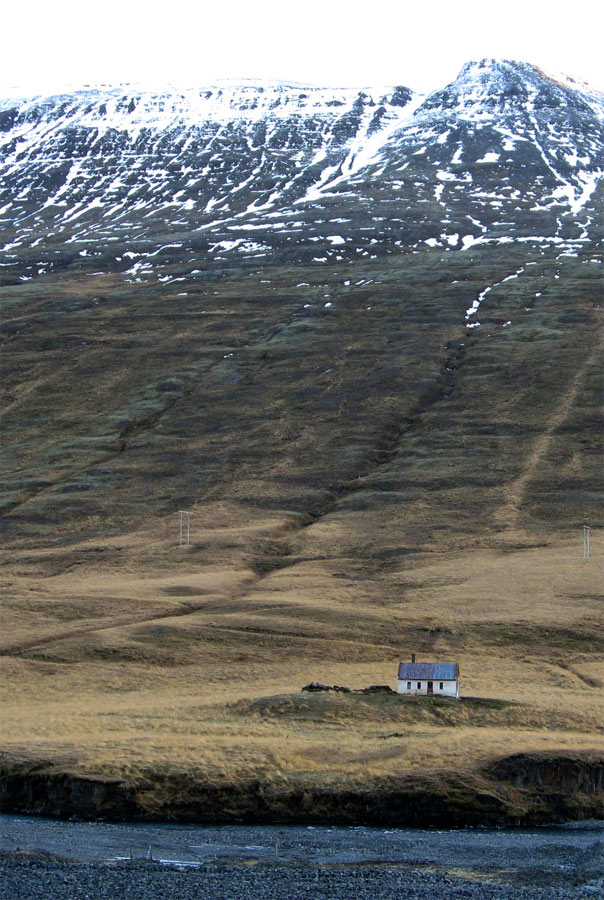
Abandoned farmstead in Öxnadalsheiði, November 2007

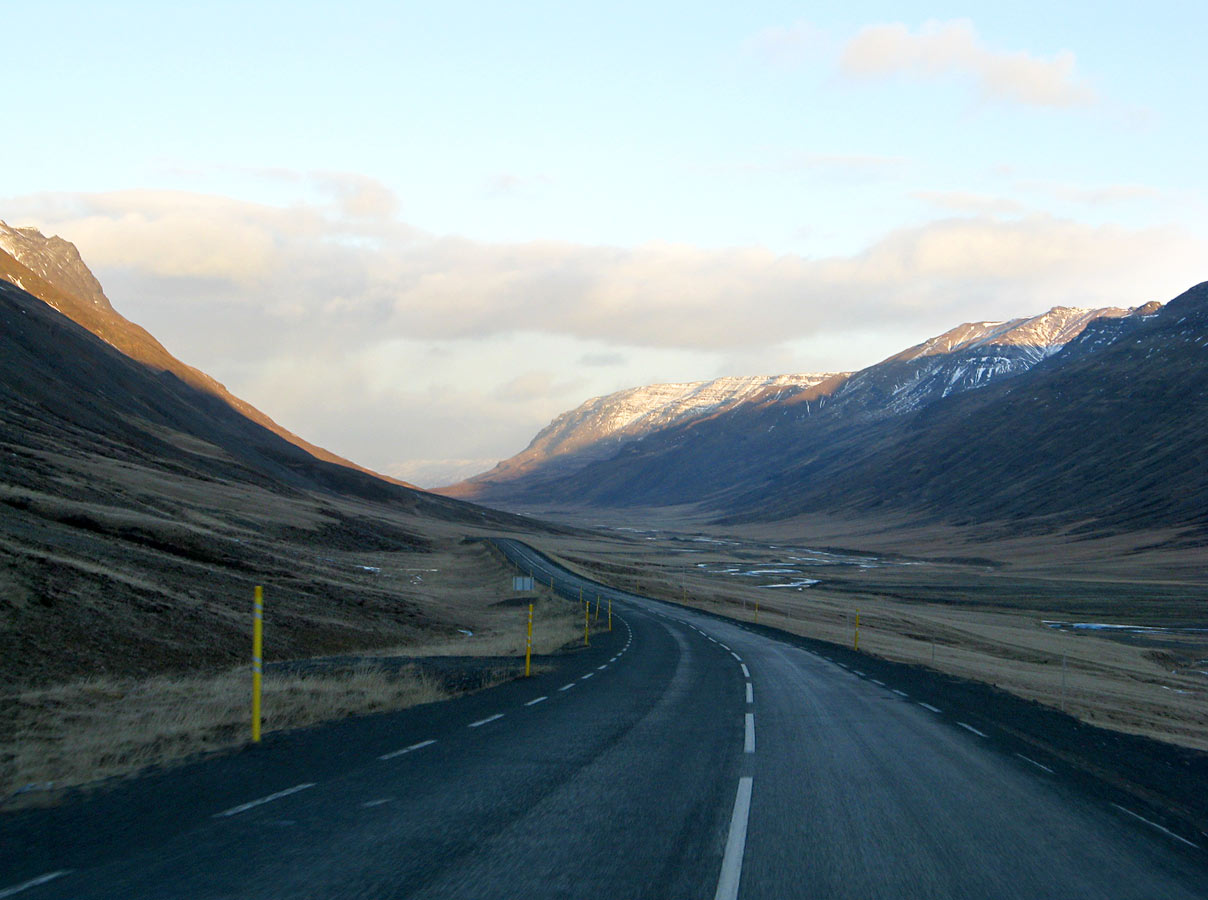
Leaving Öxnadalsheiði, entering Öxnadalur

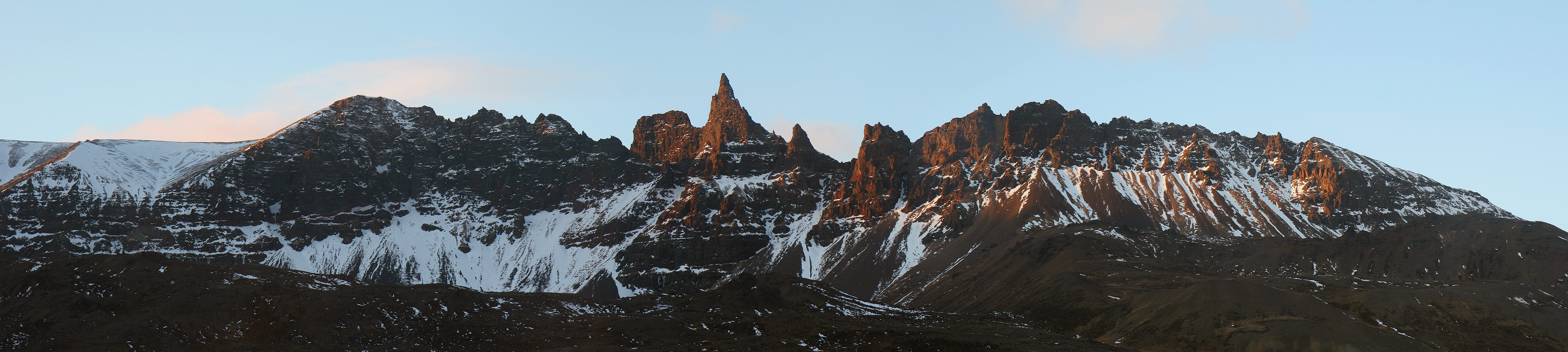
Panorama of the ridge (1188m) along the north slope of Öxnadalur
