= Glerá =

River in Iceland

Coordinates: 65°41.67′N 18°5.90′W

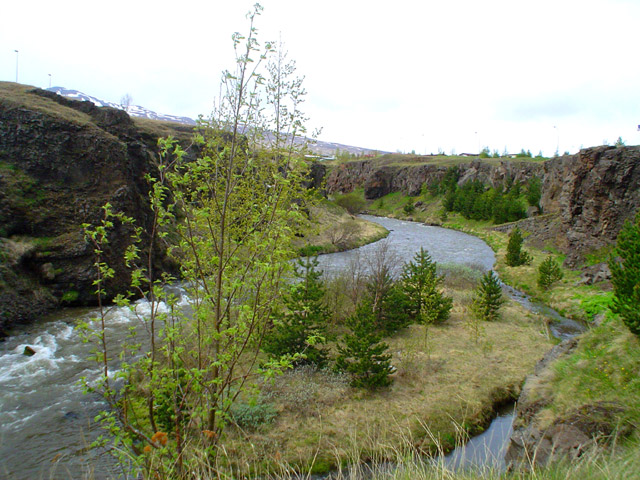
The Glerá

The Glerá (Icelandic pronunciation: [ˈklɛːrˌauː], "glass river") is a river in northern Iceland. It originates from glaciers in the mountains of the Tröllaskagi peninsula and also draws from some freshwater springs on its way down Glerá Valley. It runs through the town of Akureyri before it flows into the sea in Eyjafjörður. The river formed the sandbank of Oddeyri [ˈɔtːˌeiːrɪ] where it enters the sea. It was important in the dawn of the industrial age in Akureyri when it was dammed and used to produce electricity from 17 September 1922. The original power station has been demolished now but the dam remains. A new power station has been built to commemorate 100 years of hydroelectric power in Iceland. This 290 kW (rated capacity) power station was opened on August 27, 2005.

The river used to separate Akureyri proper from Glerá Village which was the settlement north of the Glerá but it merged with the township of Akureyri in the early 20th century. Today the part of Akureyri that is north of the Glerá is called Glerárhverfi [ˈklɛːrˌaurˌkʰvɛrvɪ] (Glerá Borough) or Þorpið [ˈθɔr̥pɪθ] (The Village) and more than 7000 of the town's 17000 residents live there.
