= Kerling =

Kerling may refer to:

- Kerling, Selangor, a town in the state of Selangor in Malaysia.
- Kerling (Iceland), a mountain in Iceland.
- Kerling-lès-Sierck, a commune in the Moselle department in France.
- Kerling, a female giant in Icelandic myth, associated with the island of Drangey
