= Digital River =

American e-commerce and marketing services company

Digital River, Inc.
- Type: Private
- Traded as: Nasdaq: DRIV (1998–2015)
- Industry: E-commerce
- Founded: February 1994; 32 years ago
- Founder: Joel Ronning (former CEO)
- Headquarters: Minnetonka, Minnesota, U.S.
- Area served: Worldwide
- Key people: Barry Kasoff (CEO); Keith Bush (President)
- Products: Digital software delivery
- Revenue: $370.5 million (2013)
- Owner: Danube Private Holdings II, LLC (Siris Capital Group)
- Number of employees: 122 (2025)
- Website: www.digitalriver.com

Digital River's previous logo.

Digital River, Inc. was a privately held company headquartered in Minnetonka, Minnesota that provided global e-commerce, payments and marketing services. In 2013, Digital River reported having processed more than US$30 billion in online transactions. The company filed for Chapter 7 bankruptcy in May 2025.

== History ==
Joel Ronning founded Digital River in February 1994. The company began trading as DRIV on the Nasdaq stock exchange on August 11, 1998.

Joel Ronning stepped down as CEO in November 2012 after the company reported multiple quarters of losses. In February 2013, Dave Dobson was named CEO.

In late 2014, Siris Capital acquired the company for $840 million. The acquisition was completed in 2015, with Digital River being delisted from Nasdaq after February 13.

In July 2018, Adam Coyle was named CEO, with Dobson becoming Vice Chairman of the Board. Coyle had previously been on the board since 2015, and worked as an executive partner with Digital River's private equity owner, Siris Capital.

In January 2020, Christopher Bernander was named CFO.

In July 2022, Vic Pacor was named CEO.

Barry Kasoff was named CEO in the summer of 2024. Kasoff is also president of a consulting firm specializing in corporate turnaround management.

In late 2024, merchants using Digital River's MyCommerce platform reported that they had not been paid money owed by Digital River since that July. Digital River disputed their claims of debts being owed.

On January 28, 2025, Digital River began the process of shutting down, citing insolvency due to multiple factors. They stated that all employees at their Minnesota offices would be laid off effective March 28, 2025 and that their German subsidiaries were also being shuttered. In May 2025, Digital River filed Chapter 7 bankruptcy.

== Acquisitions and divestitures ==
In 1999, Digital River acquired Simtel from California-based company Walnut Creek CDROM Inc.

The company acquired Orbit Commerce and RegSoft.com in 2001.

CCNow and Freemerchant.com were acquired in 2002.

Digital River acquired SWReg in 2005 for a reported $8.8 million.

Other acquisitions include:

- eSellerate (2006)
- THINK Subscription (2008)
- Journey Education Marketing (2010)
- Fatfoogoo (2010)
- CCNow (sold to Snorrason Holdings in 2012)
- Journey Education Marketing (2013)

== Security breaches ==
A security breach in 2010 resulted in nearly 200,000 customers' data being stolen. Digital River sued a man who tried to sell the data.

In October 2017, after Digital River had decommissioned the FireClick platform and released the domain in 2016, the websites for Equifax and for TransUnion's Central American division were reported to have been redirecting visitors to websites that attempted drive-by downloads of malware disguised as Adobe Flash updates. The attack had been performed by hijacking third-party analytics JavaScript from FireClick.
