= ROV KIEL 6000 =

Remotely operated undersea vehicle

The ROV KIEL 6000 is a remotely operated vehicle built by Schilling Robotics, Davis, California. It's in the possession of the German GEOMAR - Helmholtz Centre for Ocean Research Kiel. The ROV has been designed for certain scientific tasks with a max. operational depth of 6,000 m (19,685 feet). The ROV is electrically powered and directly linked to the operating ship via a deep-sea glass fiber cable. It can be operated from ships of opportunity which fulfill certain requirements such as deck space and stability, power supply, dynamic positioning and crane/winch capacities.

ROV KIEL 6000 is used within multidisciplinary scientific projects such as the Cluster of Excellence "The Future Ocean" and for the installation and maintenance of ocean observatories.

== Technical specifications ==
vehicle type	QUEST 7, electrical "workclass" ROV (Schilling Robotics LLC)
working depth	up to 6000 m
dimensions	length 3.5 m, width 1.9 m, height 2.4 m (including toolskid)
weight	in air: ca. 3500 kg (incl. toolskid); in water: neutral
speed	3.0 kn ahead/astern (1.5 m/s); 2.0 kn lateral and vertical (1 m/s)
thrust	530 kgf ahead/astern; 340 kgf lateral; 300/380 kgf vertical
propulsion system	7 electric motors SPE-380 with 600 VDC @ 10 kW each (sub-Atlantic Inc.)
auto heading	± 2°
station keep (DP)	± 0.3 m
electric power	3800 - 4160 VAC/460 Hz; 60 kW on the vehicle
deep-sea cable	6500 m @ 19 mm; 1.3 t/km in air = 8.45 t; 1 t/km in water = 6.2 t in max. water depth; 3 copper wires with 4 mm^{2} diameter; 3 fibre optic cable (LWL) SM
deep-sea winch	2 electric motors @ 80 kW each; weight incl. cable: ca. 30 t
digital telemetry	4 nodes with 16 ports each (serial, video and Ethernet); multiplexer for data transfer in the Gbit range (including HDTV and high- resolution multibeam depth sounder)
scientific payload	up to 100 kg on toolskid with 2 hydraulically driven drawers
hydraulic pump	15 kW with 39 lpm @ 207 bar; supplies power for the manipulators and drawers; other hydraulically driven tools can be added via valvepacks
transport of the entire system	five 20' ISO containers (two of which are high cube containers)
system weight	65 t
certification	Germanischer Lloyd, Hamburg
