= Fiskidagurinn mikli =

Food festival in Iceland

Fiskidagurinn mikli (Icelandic pronunciation: [ˈfɪscɪˌtaːɣʏrɪn ˈmɪhklɪ], "The Great Fish Day") was an annual festival held in Dalvík, Iceland from the year 2001-2023.

The festival was held the Saturday after the first Monday of August. Up to 30,000 people attended and enjoyed a free fish buffet sponsored by the local fishing industry.
