= List of mountains in Iceland =

This is a list of mountains in Iceland

== List ==
Rank	Mountain peak	Location	Elevation	Prominence	Coordinates
1	Hvannadalshnjúkur (Note: Tallest point and only Ultra-prominent peak in Iceland)	List of mountains in Iceland is located in Iceland	2,110 m (6,920 ft)	2,110 m (6,920 ft)	64°0'49.561"N, 16°40'41.729"W
2	Bárðarbunga	List of mountains in Iceland is located in Iceland	2,009 m (6,591 ft)		64°38'27"N, 17°31'40"W
3	Kverkfjöll	List of mountains in Iceland is located in Iceland	1,920 m (6,300 ft)	289 m (948 ft)	64°39'40.003"N, 16°39'55.541"W
4	Snæfell	List of mountains in Iceland is located in Iceland	1,833 m (6,014 ft)	1,200 m (3,900 ft)	64°49'0"N, 18°49'0"W
5	Hofsjökull	List of mountains in Iceland is located in Iceland	1,765 m (5,791 ft)	1,022 m (3,353 ft)	64°47'49.8"N, 15°34'31.8"W
6	Herðubreið	List of mountains in Iceland is located in Iceland	1,682 m (5,518 ft)	1,014 m (3,327 ft)	65°11'0"N, 16°21'0"W
7	Eiríksjökull	List of mountains in Iceland is located in Iceland	1,675 m (5,495 ft)	1,012 m (3,320 ft)	64°46'24"N, 20°24'34"W
8	Eyjafjallajökull	List of mountains in Iceland is located in Iceland	1,666 m (5,466 ft)		63°38'N, 19°36'W
9	Tungnafellsjökull	List of mountains in Iceland is located in Iceland	1,540 m (5,050 ft)		64°43'48"N, 17°55'12"W
10	Kerling	List of mountains in Iceland is located in Iceland	1,536 m (5,039 ft)		65°33'22.860"N, 18°15'39.092"W
11	Askja	List of mountains in Iceland is located in Iceland	1,516 m (4,974 ft)		65°1'48"N, 16°45'0"W
12	Katla	List of mountains in Iceland is located in Iceland	1,512 m (4,961 ft)		
13	Hekla	List of mountains in Iceland is located in Iceland	1,488 m (4,882 ft)	755 m (2,477 ft)	63°59'32"N, 19°39'57"W
14	Snæfellsjökull	List of mountains in Iceland is located in Iceland	1,446 m (4,744 ft)		64°48'25.632"N, 23°46'34.421"W
15	Mælifellshnjúkur	List of mountains in Iceland is located in Iceland	1,446 m (4,744 ft)		65°24'0.05"N, 19°21'58.00"W
16	Sveinstindur	List of mountains in Iceland is located in Iceland	1,045 m (3,428 ft)	410 m (1,350 ft)	64°10′56″N 18°41′0″W
17	Reipstindur	List of mountains in Iceland is located in Iceland	1,045 m (3,428 ft)	685 m (2,247 ft)	
18	Kaldbakur	List of mountains in Iceland is located in Iceland	998 m (3,274 ft)	808 m (2,651 ft)	
19	Esja	List of mountains in Iceland is located in Iceland	914 m (2,999 ft)		64°15'35.975"N, 21°39'5.508"W
20	Glóðafeykir	List of mountains in Iceland is located in Iceland	910 m (2,990 ft)		65°34'5.758"N, 19°16'8.245"W
21	Kirkjufell	List of mountains in Iceland is located in Iceland	463 m (1,519 ft)		64°56'51"N, 23°18'39"W
