= Integrated School of Ocean Sciences =

Postgraduate education platform in Kiel, Germany

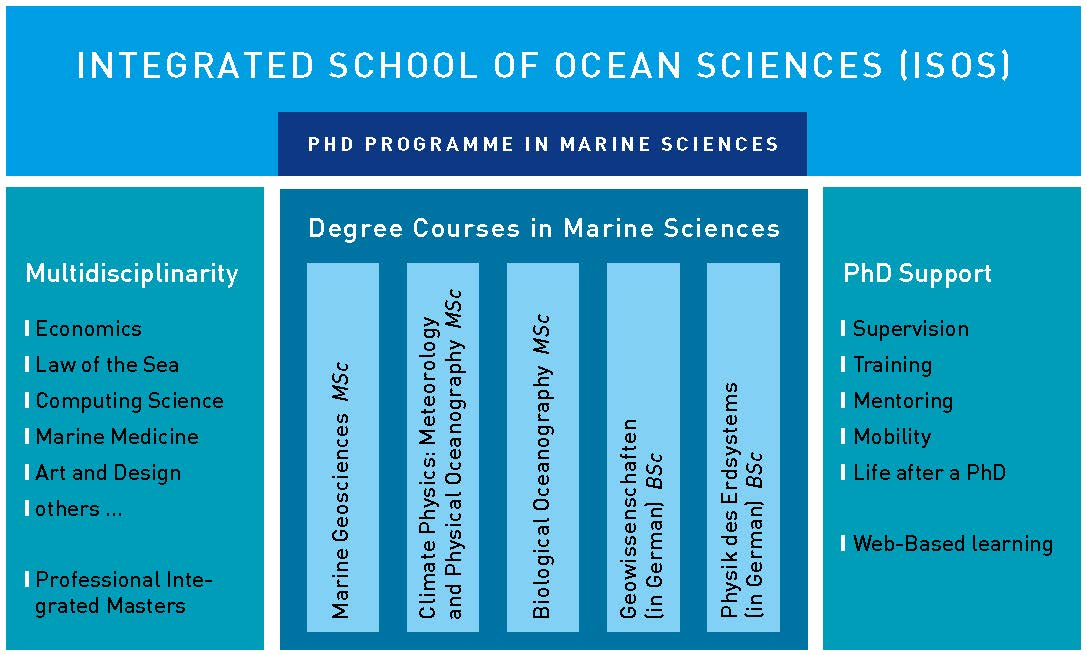
Organizational chart detailing potential higher education routes at ISOS

The Integrated School of Ocean Sciences is a platform for postgraduate education that serves the multi- and transdisciplinary research community in ocean sciences in Kiel, Germany. It is part of the Cluster of Excellence "The Future Ocean" at Kiel University.

== General ==
More than 160 doctoral candidates and 160 supervisors take part in the programme (data from August 2017) and are supported alike through ISOS. Doctoral candidates access a community from all the natural science disciplines, law, economics, ethics, art and more. They are challenged to see their research in a wider context that includes complex problem-framing in a multidisciplinary environment. Research-based education involves partners from academia, industry, politics, NGOs, which allows a flexible, need-based programme; an active alumni network provides further input into the programme. In addition, doctoral candidates can apply for financial support for conferences and for so-called 'Miniproposals', i.e. small own projects.
