= AUV Abyss =

Autonomous underwater vehicle

AUV Abyss is an autonomous underwater vehicle of the REMUS 6000 type and was built in 2008 by Hydroid, LLC (USA). It is owned by the German research facility GEOMAR - Helmholtz Centrum for Ocean Research Kiel. Its name refers to its main working area, the part of the ocean floor between 2000 and 6000 meters called the Abyssal plain. It can be used to map the ocean floor or collect data of the water column. It operates with lithium-ion batteries and can dive up to 22 hours. The AUV can be operated from all large to medium-sized research vessels.

Technical specifications
Length:	4.00 m
Diameter:	0.66 m
Weight (Air):	880 kg
Buoyancy (Water):	5 kg
Mission Depth:	10 – 6000 m
Speed:	2.5 - 4 kn
Mission Time:	up to 22 h (Sidescan Sonar) / up to 16 h (Multibeam Sonar)
Max. Range:	120 km
Power Supply:	2 Lithium-Ion battery packs provide the AUV power during a dive: Each of the two batteries consists of 672 single cells and is secured in a pressure-tight titanium bottle; Each of the two battery sets can provide 5.6 kWh; Batteries are loaded by external software-controlled chargers; external power supply is available
