= Súlur =

Mountain in Iceland

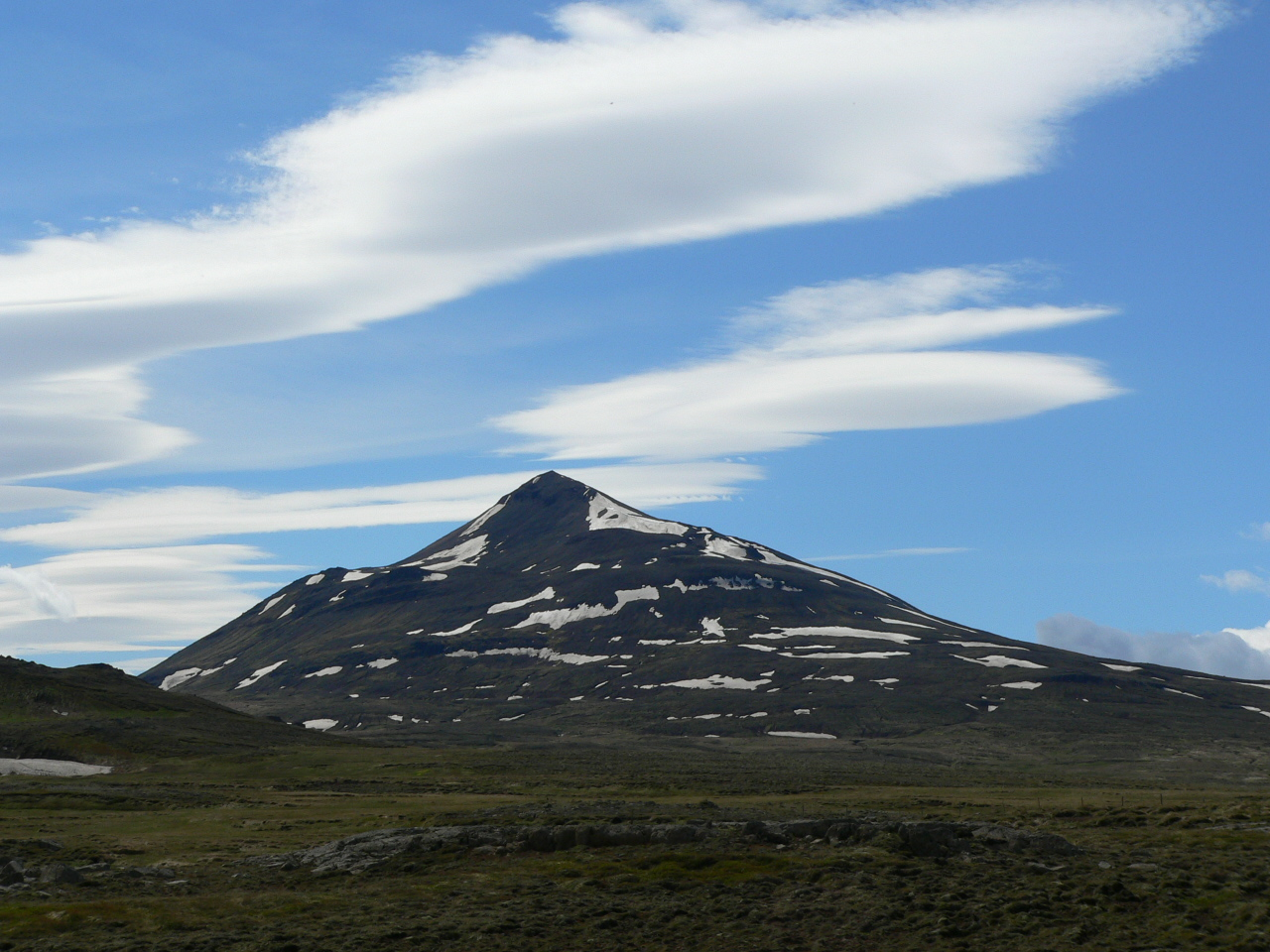
- Súlur from Hamrar

Highest point
- Elevation: 1,213 m (3,980 ft)
- Coordinates: 65.61670°N 18.2167°W

Geography
- Location: Iceland
- Parent range: Tröllaskagi

Súlur (Icelandic pronunciation: [ˈsuːlʏr̥]) is a mountain located to the south west of the town Akureyri in Iceland rising some 1213 meters. It is popular for hiking tours.
