= Daníel Hilmarsson =

Icelandic alpine skier (born 1964)

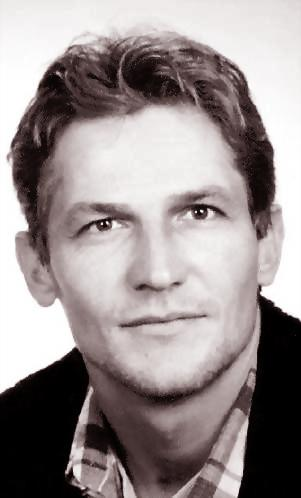

Personal information
- Full name: Daníel Þór Hilmarsson
- Born: 8 February 1964 (age 62) Dalvík, Iceland

Sport
- Country: Iceland
- Sport: Alpine skiing

Daníel Hilmarsson (born 8 February 1964) was an Icelandic alpine skier. He competed in three events at the 1988 Winter Olympics.

== Career ==
Daníel Hilmarsson competed in the 1988 Winter Olympics. He finished 24th in the slalom and 42nd in the giant slalom event. He also competed in the Super-G but was unable to finish the race. In addition, he participated in the Alpine Ski World Championships in 1985 and 1987, achieving his best result there in 1985 in Bormio with a 32nd-place finish in the giant slalom.
