= Svarfaðardalur =

Valley in Dalvíkurbyggð, Iceland

Coordinates: 65°51.852′N 18°41.429′W

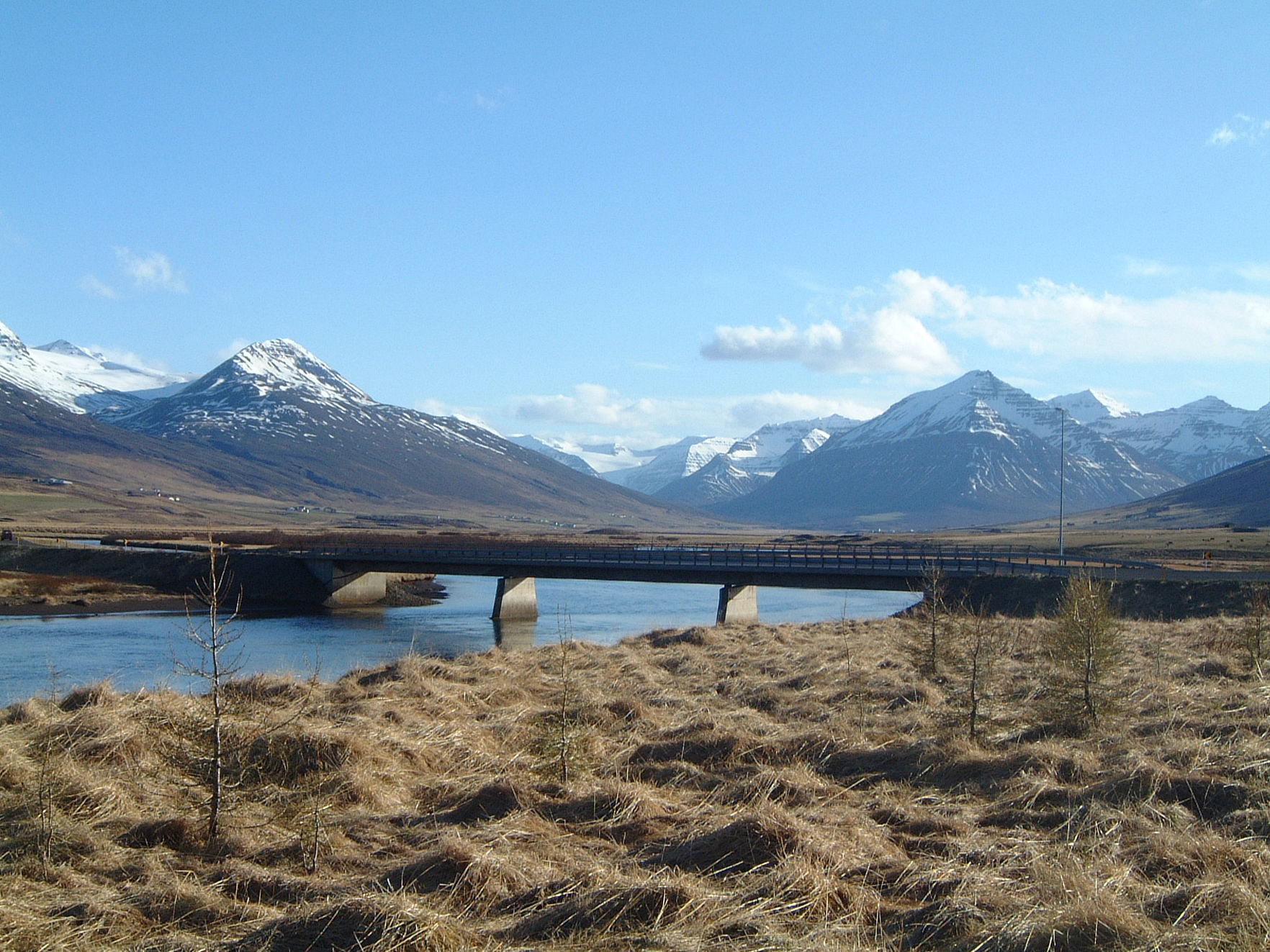
Svarfaðardalur-Skíðadalur, Árgerði Bridge in the front, the glacier Gljúfurárjökull in the back.

Svarfaðardalur (Icelandic pronunciation: [ˈsvarvaðarˌtaːlʏr̥], "Svörfuður's valley") is a large valley in central north Iceland. It is a part of the Dalvíkurbyggð municipality. The Svarfaðardalsá River flows along the valley, having its mouth near to the town of Dalvík. About 10 km from the sea the valley splits in two. The eastern one is called Skíðadalur and it keeps the main direction of the valley to the southwest, while the other one keeps the name Svarfaðardalur. Numerous small valleys branch off from the main valleys in between the mountains. There are small glaciers in many of in these valleys. The largest glacier is Gljúfurárjökull, which is at the bottom of Skíðadalur a prominent landmark for the whole settlement. The mountains surrounding Svarfaðardalur are high and steep, with many peaks between 1000-1400 m high. The highest mountains are in Skíðdalur, the highest one is Dýjafjallshnjúkur, 1456 m.
