= Hrísey =

- Island and village
- Location of the island Hrísey
- Coordinates: 66°00′N 18°23′W
- Country: Iceland
- Constituency: Northeast Constituency
- Region: Northeastern Region
- Municipality: Akureyri

Area
  - Land: 7.67 km^{2} (2.96 sq mi)

Population (January 2017)
  - Total: 153
- Postal code: 630
- Website: Official website

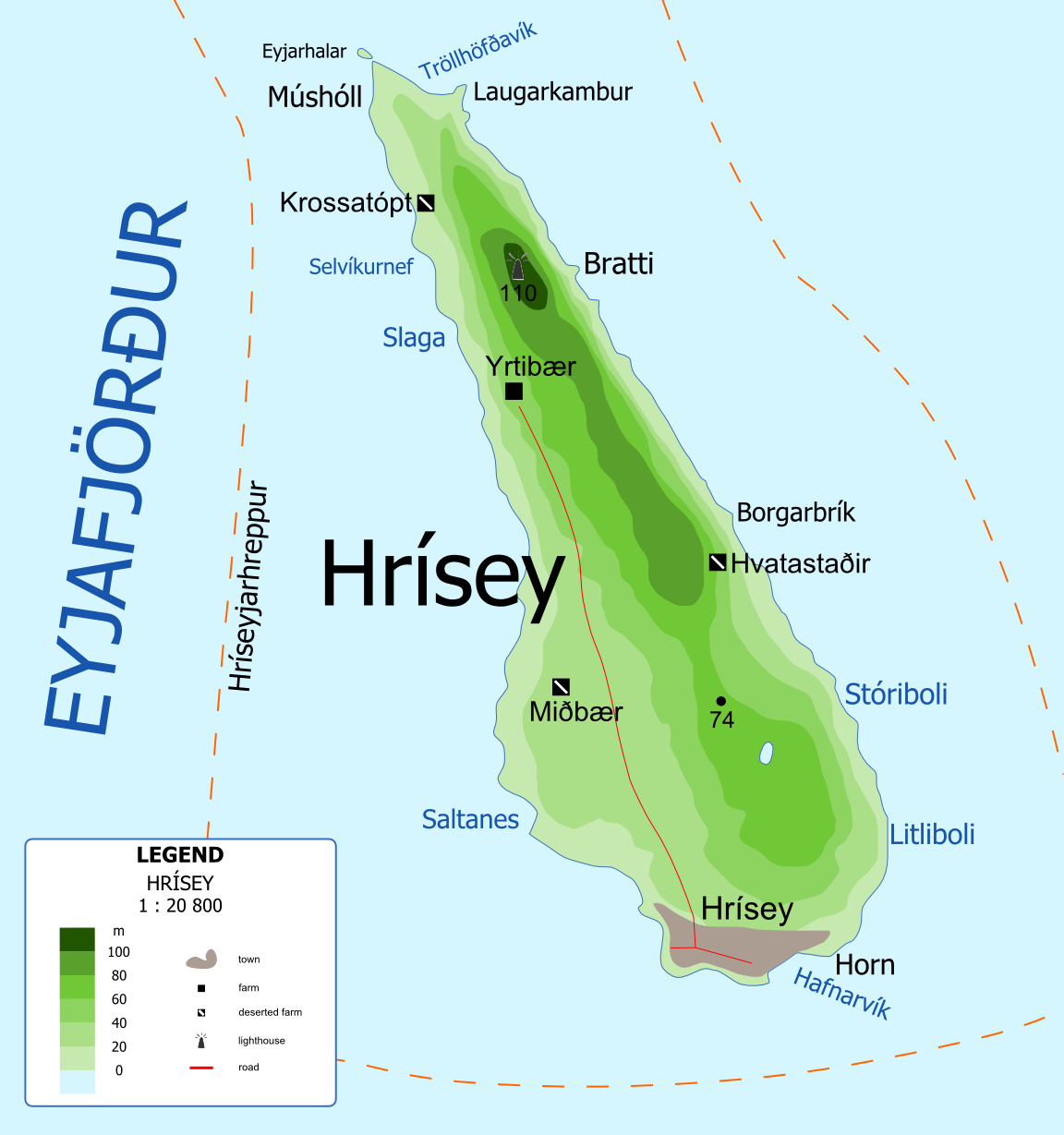

Hrísey (Icelandic pronunciation: [ˈr̥iːsˌeiː]) is a small island off the north coast of Iceland, situated approximately 35 kilometres (22 miles) north of Akureyri, in Eyjafjörður, at 66°00′N 18°23′W.

Since 2004, the island has been a part of the municipality of Akureyri, having previously been a municipality in its own right.

The community of Hrisey, Iceland.

Hrísey island itself has a total land area of 7.67 km^{2} (2.96 sq mi). It is about 7.5 km (4.7 mi) long and 2.5 km (1.6 mi) across at its widest in the south. It is the third-largest island of Iceland (after Heimaey in the Vestmannaeyjar and Iceland itself). It has a population of approximately 120 people and has been continuously inhabited since the Settlement of Iceland.

== Economy and infrastructure ==
The island is connected to the mainland by a ferry service to Árskógssandur, a fifteen-minute sailing. Sailings to Dalvík are also sometimes used. The island is connected to the mainland by subsea electrical and fibre cables. The island has an independent geothermal district heating network.

Historically, the island was used as a base for the fishing industry, first by Norwegians and Swedes, and then by Icelanders. By the late nineteenth century, it housed a herring salting factory. Overfishing in Icelandic waters led to a steep decline in the fishing industry in the 1960s, and the last fish freezing plant on Hrísey, owned by the Eyjafjörður Co-operative Society, closed in 1999.

More recently, Hrísey has developed a reputation as a birdwatching destination. There are no natural predators on the island, making it an ideal bird sanctuary. The northern part of Hrísey, Ystabæjarland, is a privately owned nature reserve and the killing of birds is forbidden on the rest of the island. Among the forty species of bird on the island are the ptarmigan, Arctic tern, and eider duck.
