= Freymóður Jóhannsson =

Icelandic artist, painter, and composer

Freymóður Jóhannsson (12 September 1895 – 3 March 1973) was an Icelandic artist, painter and song composer.
