= JAGO (German research submersible) =

Crewed German research submersible

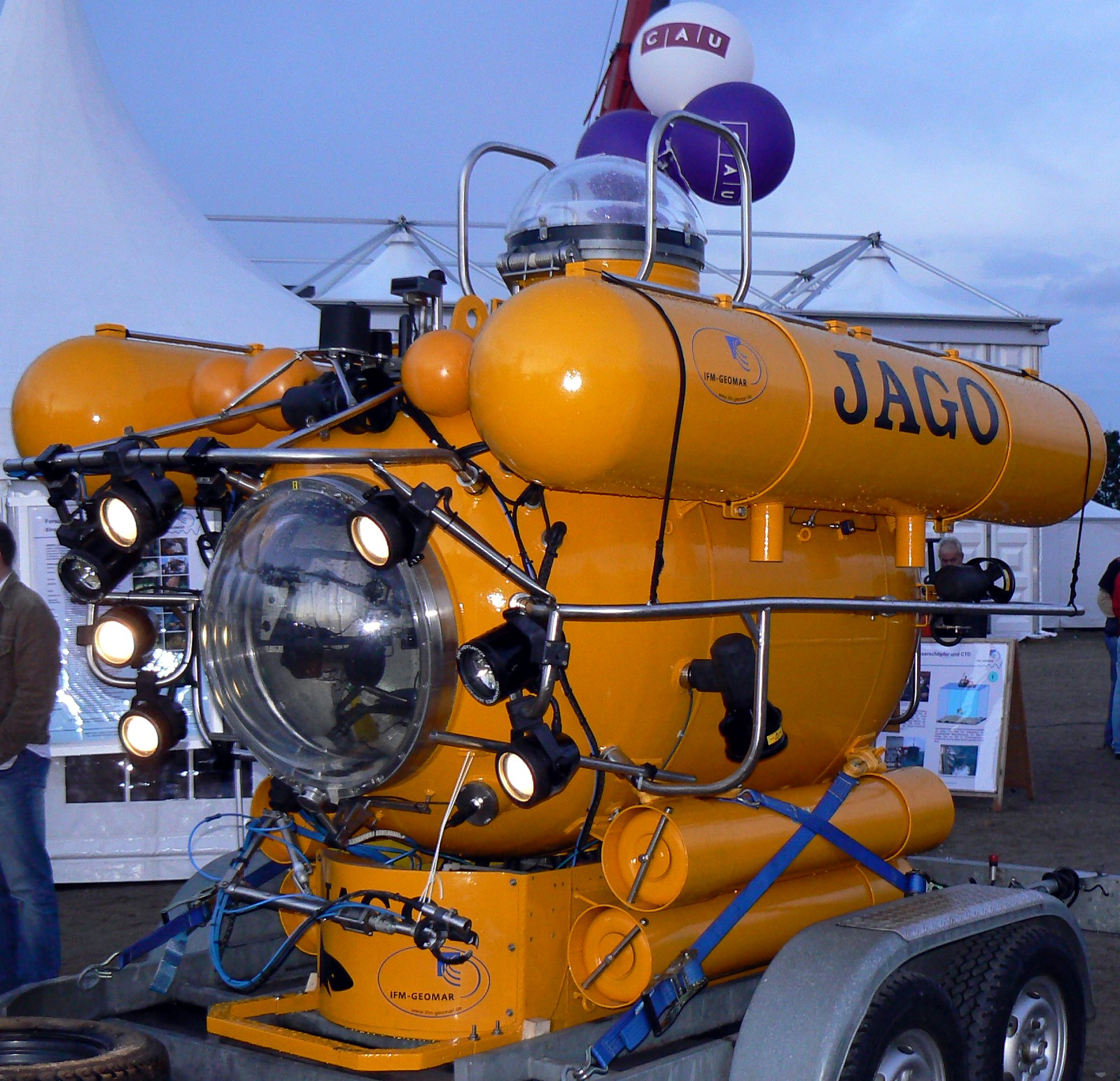
Research submersible JAGO

JAGO is the only crewed German research submersible. The submersible and the crew K. Hissmann and the pilot J. Schauer are based at the GEOMAR Helmholtz Centre for Ocean Research Kiel since 1 January 2006. The former owner was zoologist Hans Fricke from the Max Planck Institute for Behavioral Physiology in Seewiesen, Bavaria. JAGO can dive up to 400 metres (1,300 ft) and can carry one pilot and one observer. It can sample organisms, rock, gas and liquids, and can be used as a rescue and recovery vehicle for the northern Baltic Sea area. Due to the multidisciplinary connection between the GEOMAR and the Christian-Albrechts-Universität zu Kiel, scientists from the Cluster of Excellence "The Future Ocean" have occasional access to the submersible.

In 2011 JAGO undertook a search to find and inspect Nautilus, one of the first submarines adapted for research.

== Technical specifications ==
Dimensions	length 3.0 m, beam 2.0 m, height 2.5 m
Weight in air	3000 kg
Operation depth	400 m
Cruising speed	1 knot
Crew	1 pilot, 1 observer
Life Support	96 man hours
Pressure hull	steel, 15–18 mm
Viewports	acrylic bow viewport (700 mm ø, aperture angle 120°); top dome / hatch (450 mm ø, aperture angle 180°) providing 360°
Power supply	6 lead-acid batteries, total capacity 13 KWh – 24 Volt DC
Propulsion	4 reversible horizontal thrusters at stern, 2 rotatable thrusters on starboard and port sides, 1 bow and 1 stern vertical thruster
Basic systems	720 L diving tanks for buoyancy at surface, 40 L ballast tank for vertical movements, 2 oxygen high pressure cylinders, 3 high pressure air cylinders, filter for CO_{2} absorption (air regeneration)
Rescue systems	emergency drop weight with dead man safety system, generating 500 kg positive buoyancy at 400 m depth, and emergency buoy with rescue device
Equipment	Underwater navigation and positioning system (USBL ORE), compass, depth gauges, vertical and horizontal scanning sonar, underwater acoustic telephone communication UT 10 kHz, Xenon and Halogen lights, flash lights, laser scaling, digital video (HDV1080i) and still cameras for documentation, CTD, hydraulic manipulator arm with exchangeable claws, sampling devices for organisms, gas, water, fluids, sediments, rocks
Transport	1 x 20' ISO container
Classification	Germanischer Lloyd Hamburg, Germany
