= Hjalteyri =

- Village
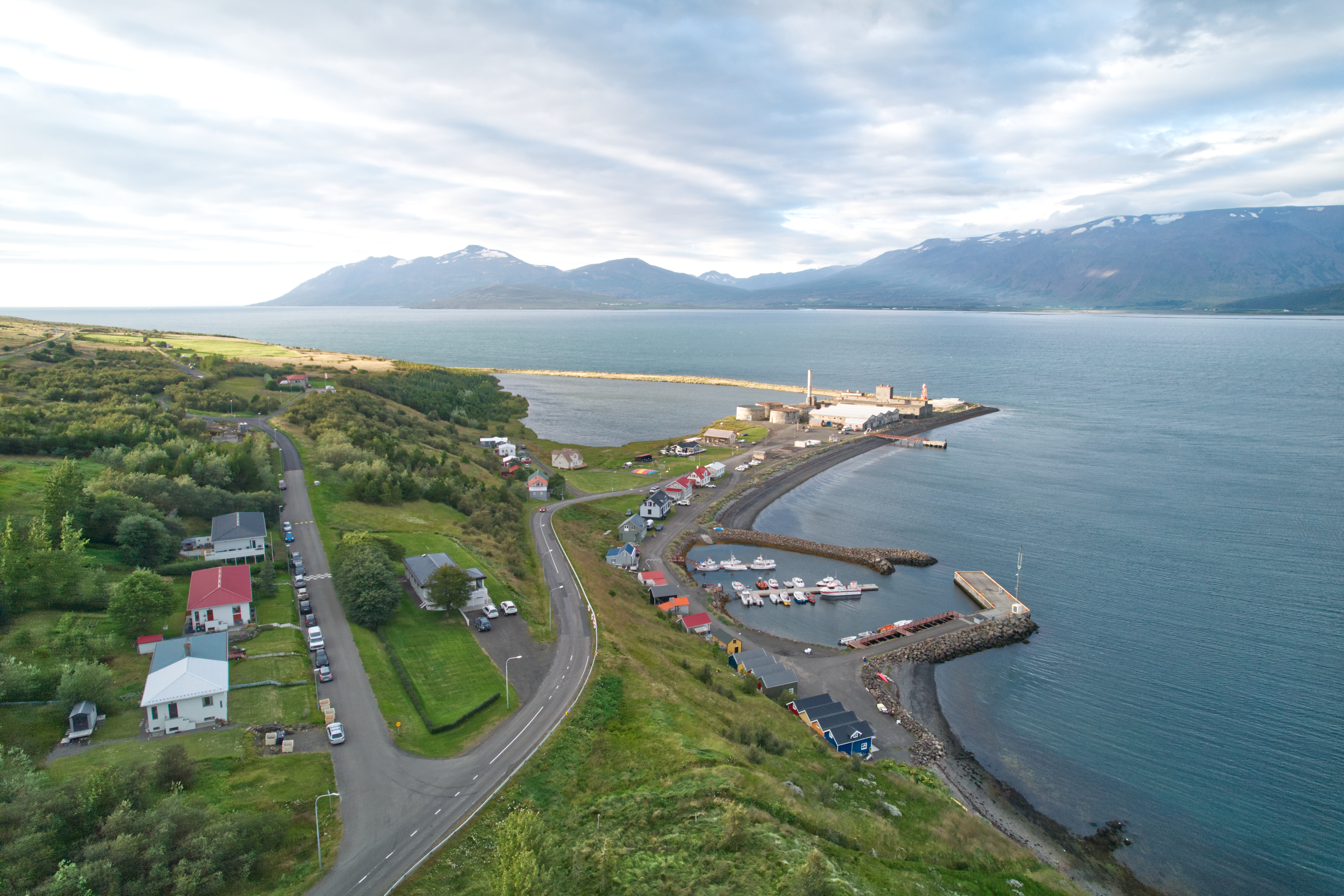
- A view of Hjalteyri

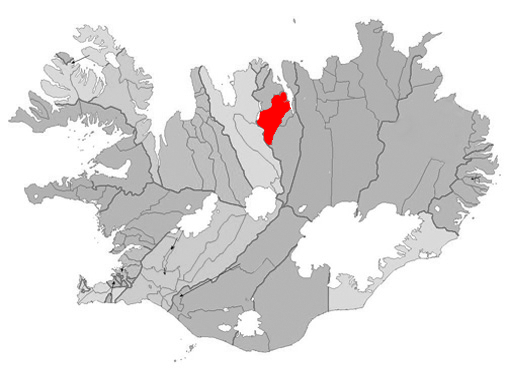
- Location of the Municipality of Hörgársveit

- Location of Hjalteyri in Iceland
- Coordinates: 65°51′N 18°12′W
- Country: Iceland
- Constituency: Northeast Constituency
- Region: Northeastern Region
- Municipality: Hörgársveit

Population
  - Total: 43
- Time zone: UTC+0 (GMT)

Arnarneshreppur
- Former Municipality
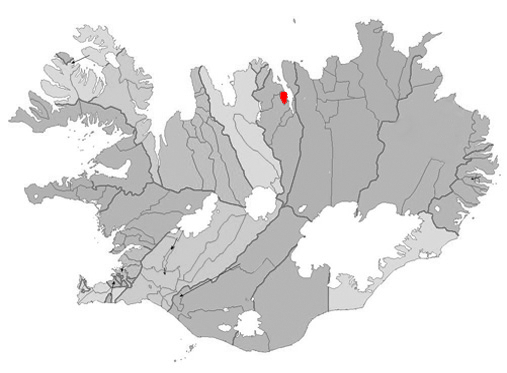
- Location of the former Municipality of Arnarneshreppur
- Coordinates: 66°11′N 18°53′W
- Country: Iceland

Hjalteyri (Icelandic pronunciation: [ˈçal̥tˌeiːrɪ]) is a tiny fishing village in northern Iceland in the Norðurland eystra region.

Hjalteyri has 43 inhabitants and was the largest settlement in the former municipality of Arnarneshreppur before it merged to become part of Hörgársveit. Hjalteyri is on the west bank of the Eyjafjörður fjord and is one of the major fishing ports in the region. The company Fiskey originally started operations in Hjalteyri.

Hjalteyri is well known because of the large herring meal and oil processing factory that the company Kveldúlfur h.f. built there in 1937. The factory was the largest herring processing factory of its kind in Iceland at this time. The factory was operated until 1966 or for 29 years.

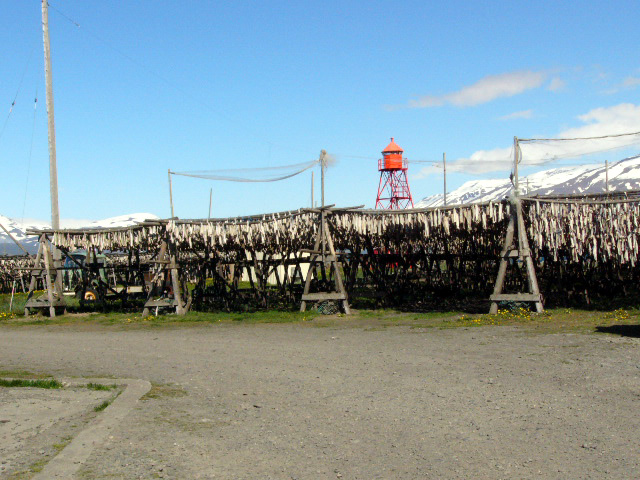
Fish drying at Hjalteyri
