= Dalvík =

Town in northern Iceland

- Town and Municipality
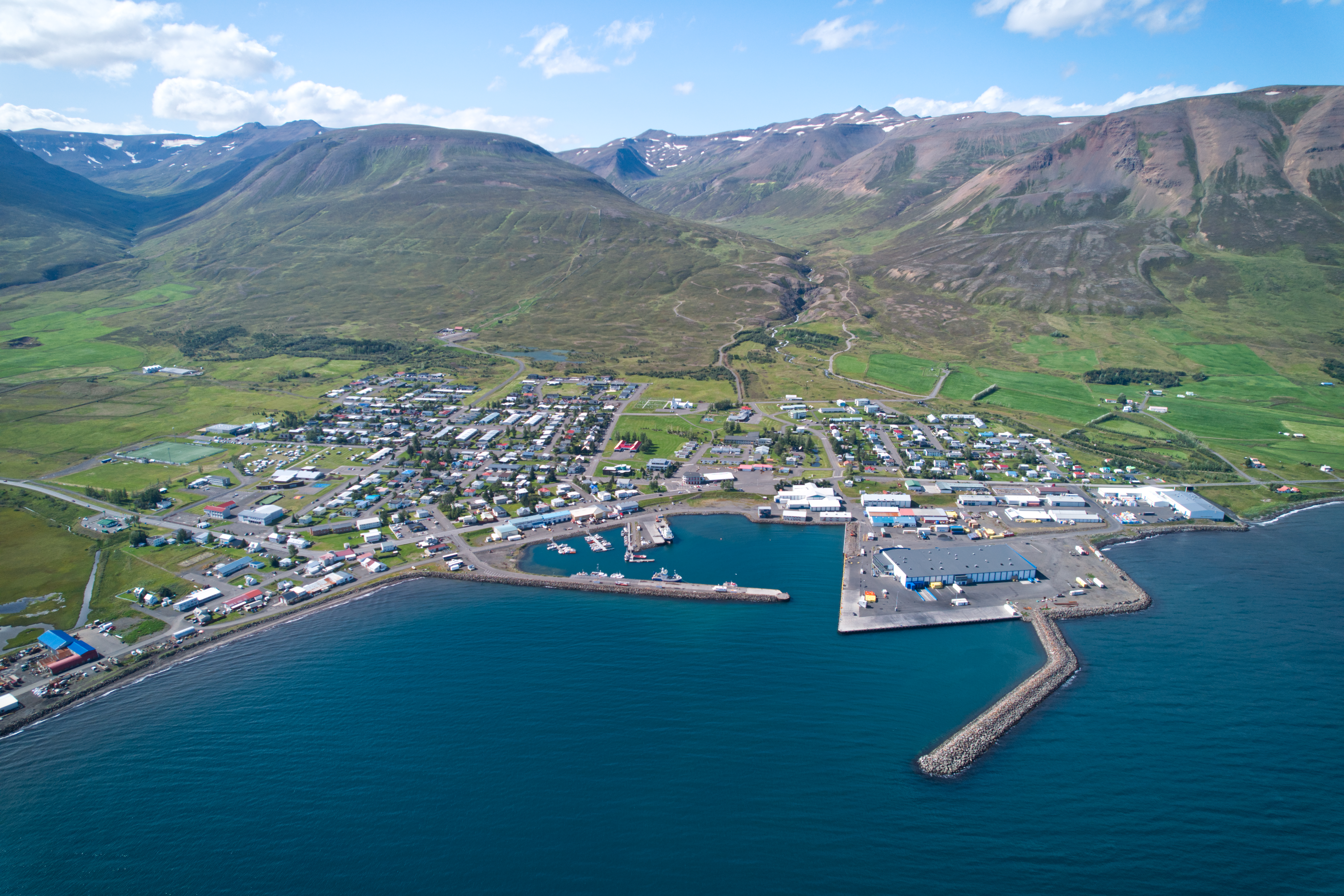
- Dalvík in 2025

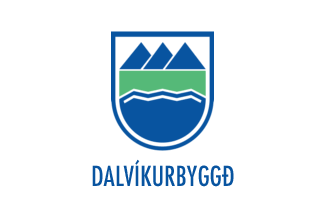
- Flag

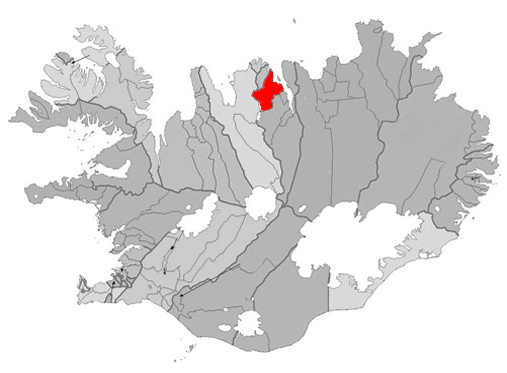
- Location of the Municipality of Dalvíkurbyggð

- Location of Dalvík
- Coordinates: 65°58′N 18°32′W
- Country: Iceland
- Constituency: Northeast Constituency
- Region: Northeastern Region
- Municipality: Dalvíkurbyggð

Population (January 2011)
  - Total: 1,454
- Postal code: 620
- Website: Official website

Dalvík (Icelandic pronunciation: [ˈtal.ˌviːk]) is the main town of Dalvíkurbyggð, a municipality of Iceland. As of January 2011, its population was 1,454 people.

The town's name means "valley bay".

== Geography ==
Dalvík is on the western shore of Eyjafjörður in the valley of Svarfaðardalur.

== Transportation ==
Dalvík harbor is a regional commercial port for import and fishing. Sæfari, the ferry that sails from Dalvík, serves the island of Grímsey, Iceland's northernmost community which lies on the Arctic Circle. Bus services to Siglufjörður and Akureyri are provided by Strætó.

== Culture ==
The annual Fiskidagurinn mikli festival is held the Saturday after the first Monday of August, attended by up to 30,000 people who enjoy a free fish buffet sponsored by the local fishing industry. Despite its small size, Dalvík has had four representatives at the Eurovision song contest for Iceland.

== Sports ==
In sports, Dalvík is probably best known for alpine skiing. Böggvisstaðafjall is one of the best known ski areas in Iceland. The town has produced a series of skiers who have represented Iceland in the Olympics, World Cups, World Championships, and European Cups, as well as other international and national competitions. Amongst these have been Daníel Hilmarsson, Sveinn Brynjólfsson and Björgvin Björgvinsson.

Football teams from the village have had their ups and downs but have managed to produce some nationally known players; the most recognized one is former Cardiff City and Premier League and Iceland forward Heiðar Helguson.

Hamar golf club has a 9-hole course, a short drive outside Dalvík.

== Economy ==
The local economy is based upon fisheries and fish processing.

Dalvík is also a tourist destination for boat trips in whale watching and heli skiing.

== Impact and legacy ==
The Dalvik process virtual machine in the Android operating system was named after this village. While the Dalvik virtual machine has been discontinued, replaced by Android Runtime in current versions of Android, .dex (Dalvik EXecutable) and .odex (Optimized Dalvik EXecutable) files are still used, so the Dalvik bytecode is still used for all Android apps.
