= GEOMAR Helmholtz Centre for Ocean Research Kiel =

Research institute in Kiel, Germany

Coordinates: 54°19′38″N 10°10′51″E

GEOMAR - Helmholtz Centre for Ocean Research Kiel
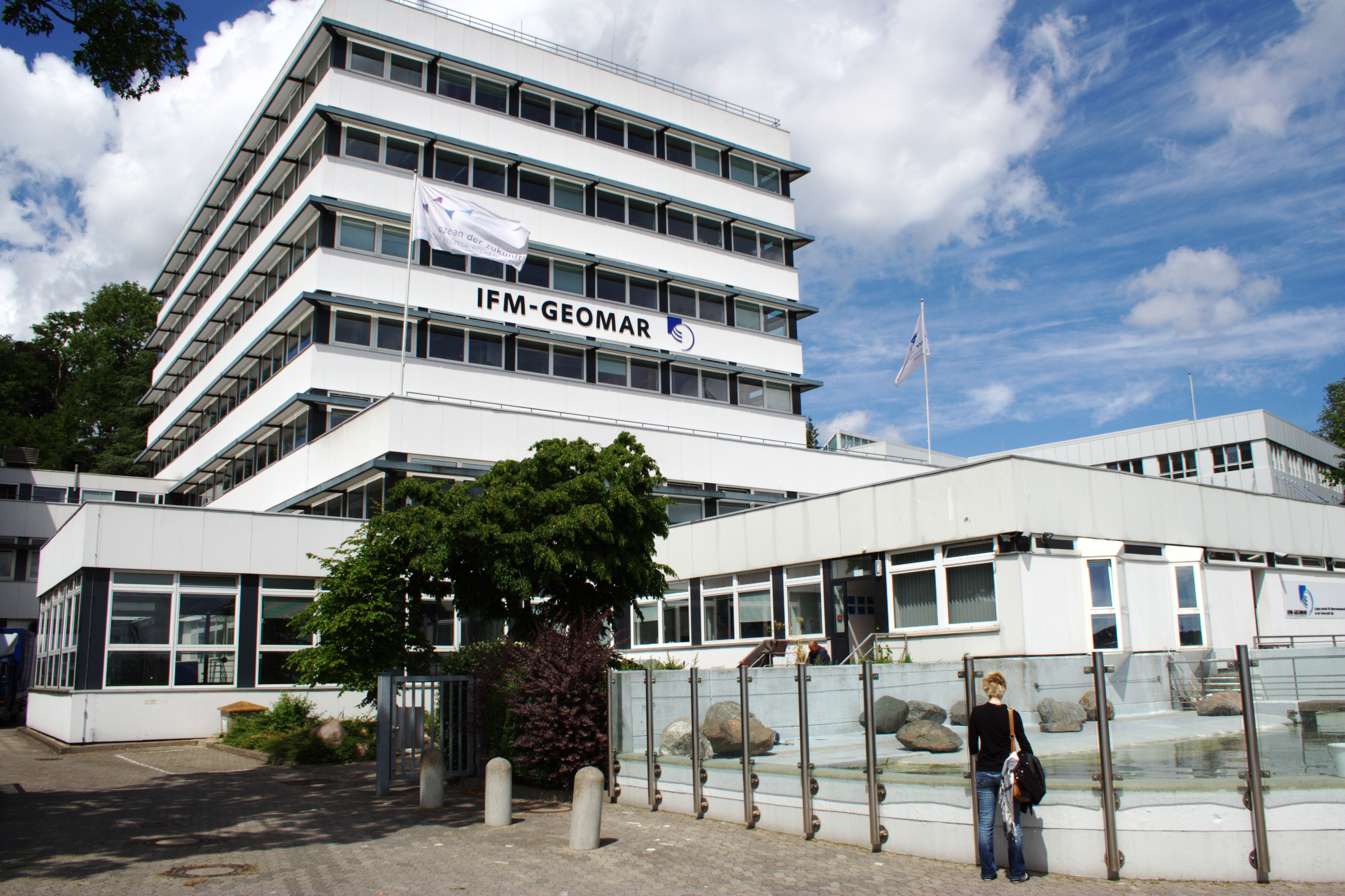
- Abbreviation: GEOMAR
- Formation: 2012
- Type: Nonprofit research organization
- Purpose: Marine research
- Headquarters: Kiel, Germany
- Region served: Worldwide
- Members: Helmholtz Association; Deutsches Forschungsbohrkonsortium; FishBase Consortium
- Director: Katja Matthes
- Affiliations: Kiel University
- Budget: € 72 million
- Staff: about 950 (scientists plus supporting staff)
- Website: geomar.de

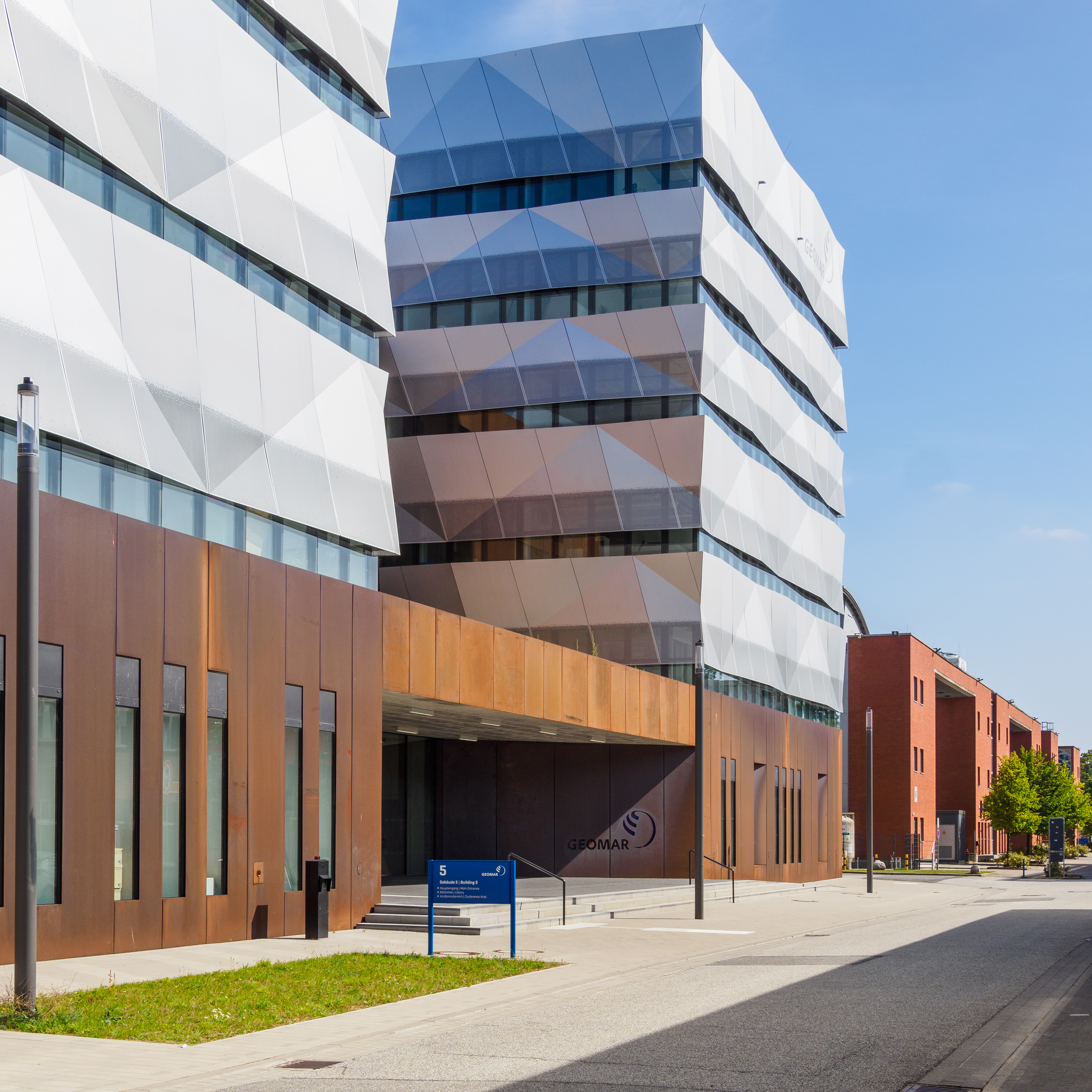
GEOMAR in Kiel-Wellingdorf

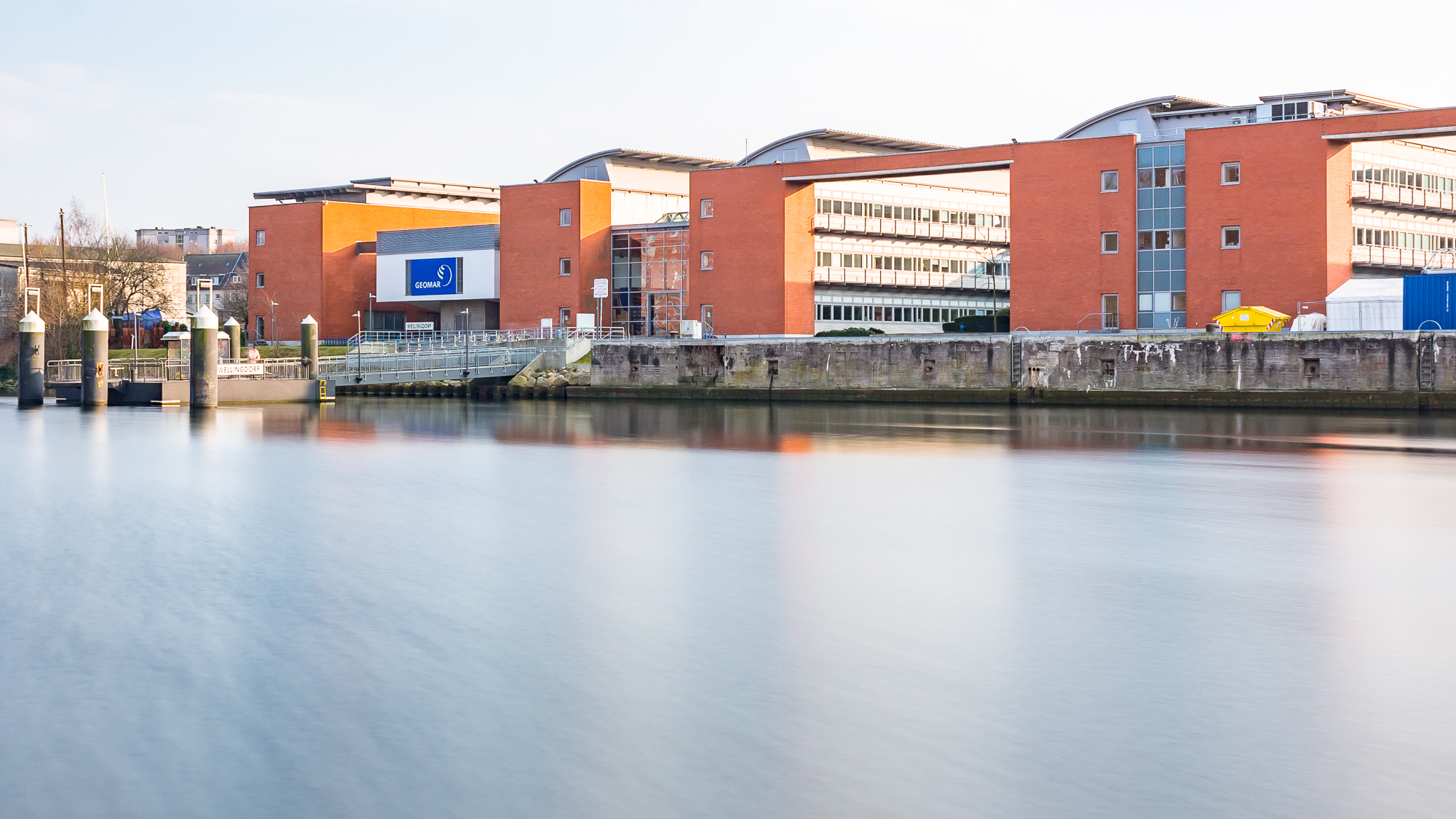
GEOMAR Helmholtz-Zentrum für Ozeanforschung Kiel Ostufer

The GEOMAR - Helmholtz Centre for Ocean Research Kiel (GEOMAR), formerly known as the Leibniz Institute of Marine Sciences (German: Leibniz-Institut für Meereswissenschaften, IFM-GEOMAR), is a research institute in Kiel, Germany. It was formed in 2004 by merging the Institute for Marine Science (Institut für Meereskunde Kiel, (IFM)) with the Research Center for Marine Geosciences (GEOMAR) and is co-funded by both federal and provincial governments. It was a member of the Leibniz Association until 2012 and is coordinator of the FishBase Consortium. Since 2012 it is member of the Helmholtz Association and named GEOMAR - Helmholtz Centre for Ocean Research Kiel. The institute operates worldwide in all ocean basins, specialising in climate dynamics, marine ecology and biogeochemistry, and ocean floor dynamics and circulation. GEOMAR offers degree courses in affiliation with Kiel University, and operates the Kiel Aquarium and the Lithothek, a repository for split sediment core samples.

== Research divisions ==
GEOMAR is structured into four research divisions:

- Ocean circulation and climate dynamics: This division, led by Katja Matthes and Mojib Latif, investigates climate from different time perspectives, with computer simulations and ocean current models that include meteorological, geological and oceanographic considerations. Current ocean measurements are made from research vessels at sea, and include the use of remote sensing.
- Marine biogeochemistry: Work in this division looks at the way the components of the marine biogeochemical processes interact with each other. These components include the material in the atmosphere, the sediment and oceanic reservoirs, and the biological organisms including humans. Particular attention is paid to the atmosphere/ocean interface and the sediment/ocean interface, as well as to elements and compounds which can cycle and cause radiative forcing. Research ranges from the atmosphere over the ocean, through the ocean surface layer into the water column, and then down to the marine sediments and the oceanic crust. Field work is also undertakes, as well as laboratory and mesocosm studies. The division also develops biological, chemical and isotope diagnostic tools for measuring proxy variables.
- Marine ecology: This division, led by Ulrich Sommer, aims to "understand the sensitivity of marine ecosystems to anthropogenic and natural changes, with a mid-term focus on climate change and overexploitation of marine bio-resources." It is important to understand how much stress a given ecosystem can absorb before structural shifts occur. When a shift does occur, it is necessary to understand how this will impact the ecosystem populations and the degree to which the shift can be reversed. Structural shifts can result in invasions by harmful organisms, species collapse and a radical reconfiguring of the biogeochemical cycles. Traditional approaches group species broadly into size classes and trophic levels measured by productivity or biomass. But to understand how ecosystems react to natural and anthropogenic stressors, specific differences in the way individual species react must also be understood, particularly where keystone species are involved. Research within this division range from genes to ecosystems, including the "ecophysiology of key species and its genetic basis, dynamics and genetics of individual populations and of communities, interactions within and among species, structure and response of entire food webs."
- Dynamics of the ocean floor: Research is focused on "processes that shape the oceanic lithosphere, and the impact of these processes on the environment, e.g. climate and natural hazards. These research themes are pursued in the three main geotectonic settings: divergent and convergent margins and in intraplate regions. These three settings represent critical stages in the life-cycle of the ocean floor. The ocean basins are created by the rifting apart of continents. Oceanic lithosphere then forms at mid-ocean ridges. It is subsequently modified by low and high temperature interactions with the overlying oceans, the addition of intraplate magmas, the deposition of marine sediments, and tectonic processes occurring at or near transform and convergent plate margins. When it subducts at convergent margins, the dehydration of the plate induces arc volcanism that creates and modifies the continental crust and transfers climate-relevant volatiles into the atmosphere. Such continental margins are sites of sediment accumulation, fluid exchange, important resources and major geo-hazards."

== Research fleet ==
GEOMAR operates two seagoing research vessels: the 20-year-old research vessel Alkor (Baujahr 1990) and the research cutter Littorina (Baujahr 1975). The RV Alkor primarily operates in the Baltic, North Sea, off the Norwegian coast, and in nearby waters. She was modernized in 2010. The Littorina's primary purpose are shorter missions closer to the German coast and was overhauled in early 2012. The boat RB Polarfuchs also exists at GEOMAR. Furthermore, the research vessel RV METEOR IV is expected to be commissioned in 2026 and will be deployed worldwide, especially in the Atlantic Ocean.

Besides the manned vessels, GEOMAR also operates autonomous underwater vehicles: AUV ABYSS is specialized on operations at a depth between 2000 m and 6000 m and can dive for up to 22 hours. The two AUVs LUISE and KALLE were added in 2017 and can dive pu to 500 m deep. The institute operated JAGO, a three-ton research submersible, the only crewed research submersible in Germany, capable of diving to 400 metres,, which was decommissioned in 2021 for financial and personnel reasons and due to lack of demand. The remotely operated vehicles ROV KIEL 6000 is capable of diving to 6000 m and controlled through a deep-sea glass fibre cable, while the ROV PHOCA can dive to 3000 m.

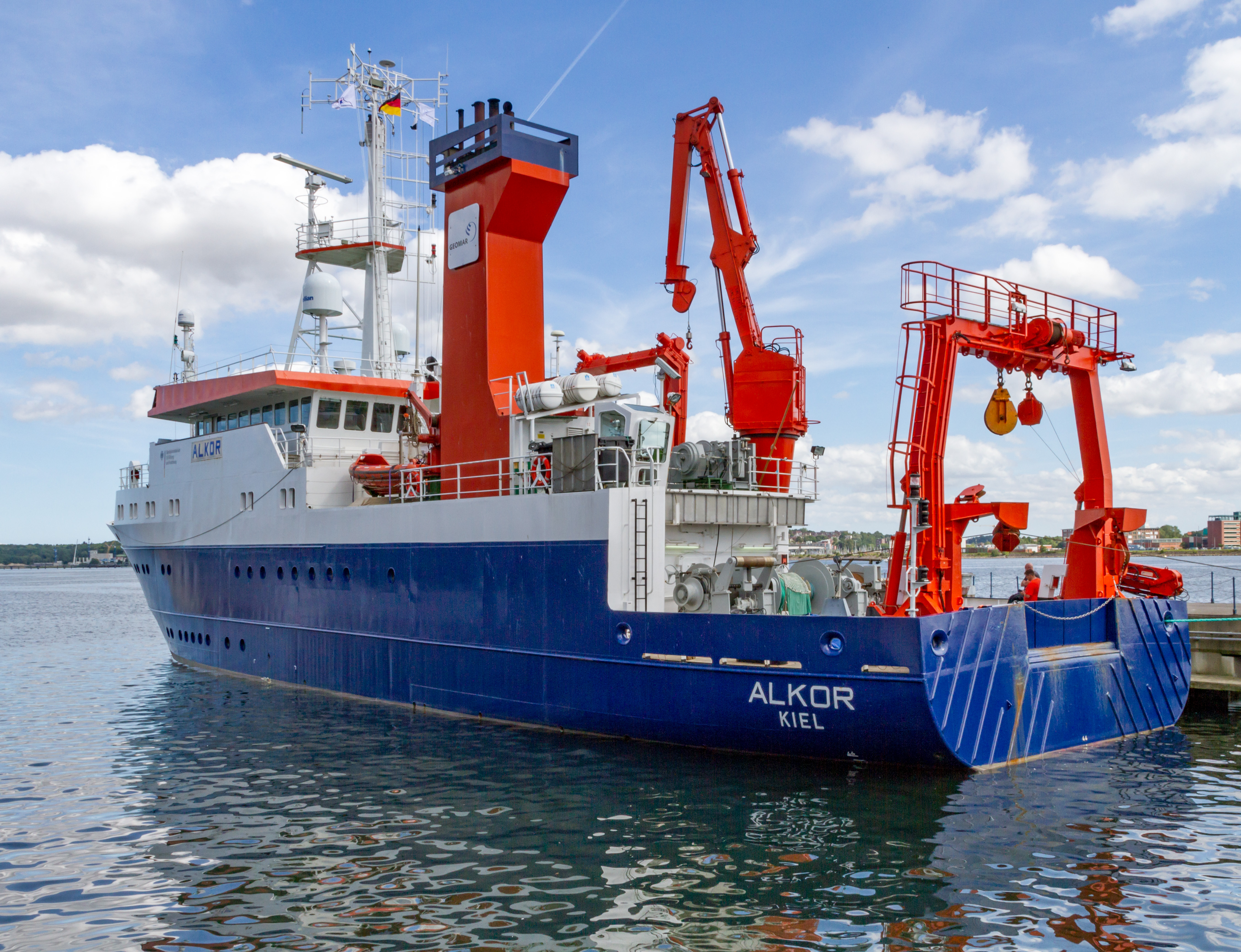
Research vessel, RV Alkor
(1000 GT)

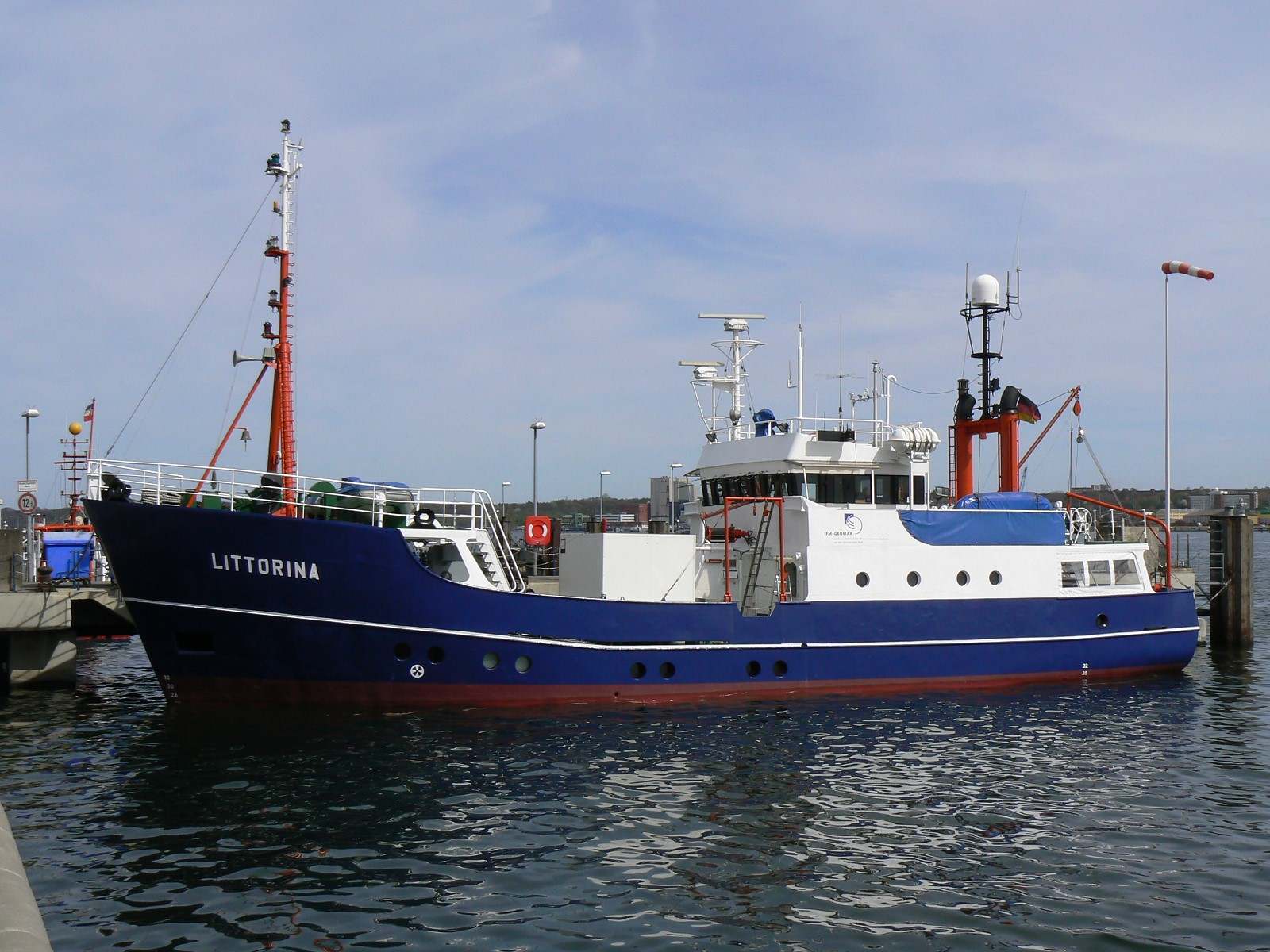
Research cutter, RC Littorina
(168 GT)

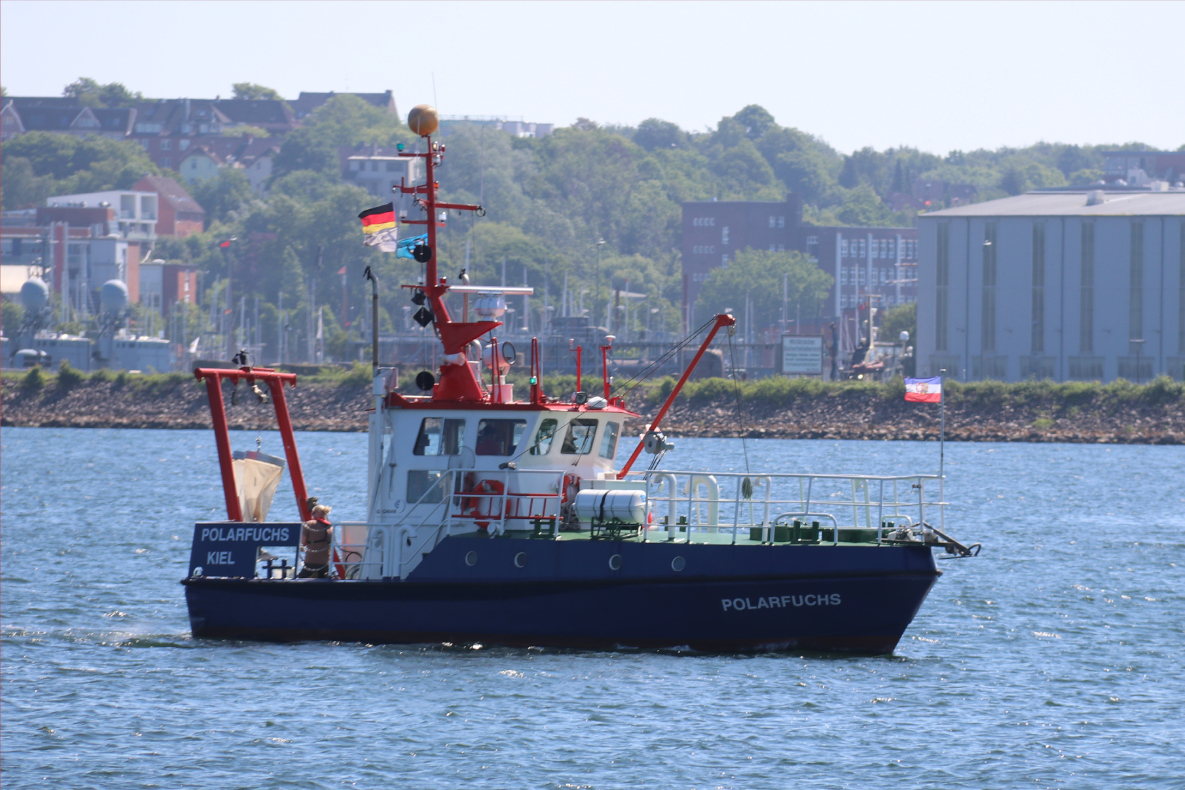
Research boat, RB Polarfuchs
(16 GT)

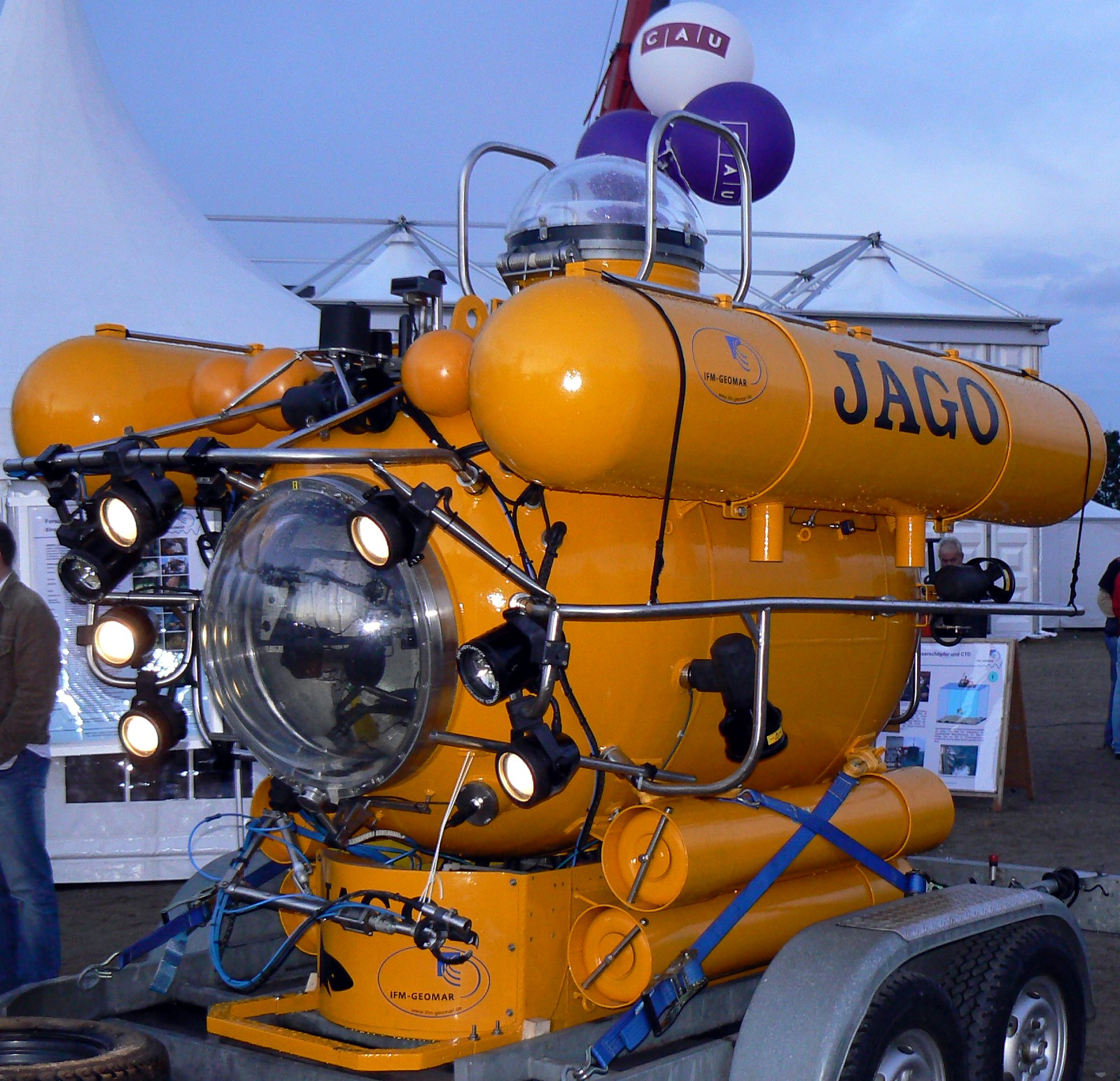
JAGO, a 3-ton crewed research submersible
