= Eyjafjörður =

Fjord in Iceland

Coordinates: 65°51′N 18°08′W

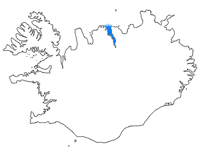
Eyjafjörður shown in blue

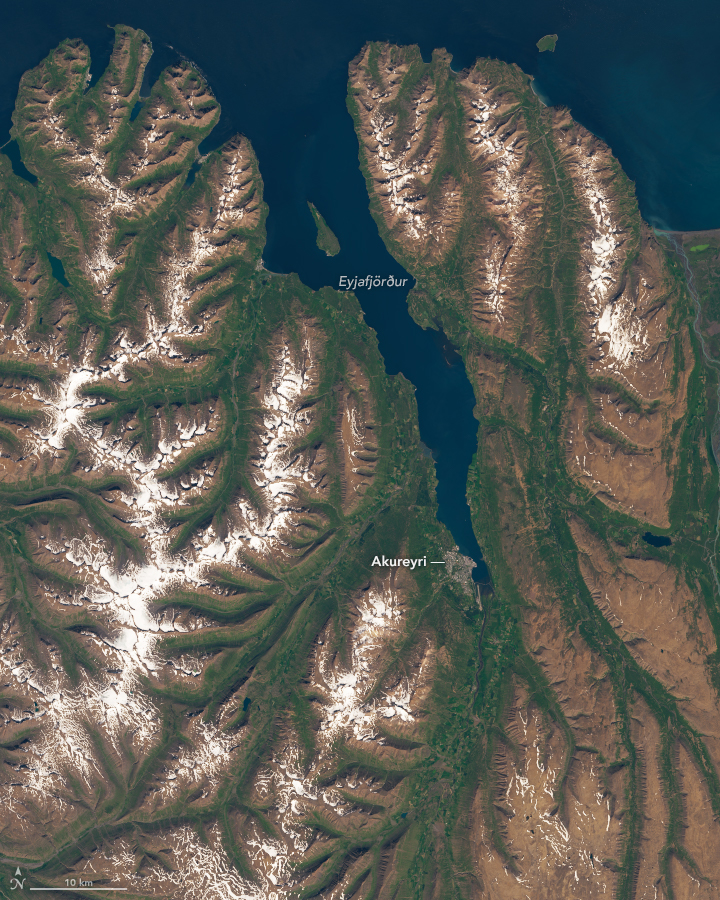
Eyjafjörður and Akureyri from space, July 2017

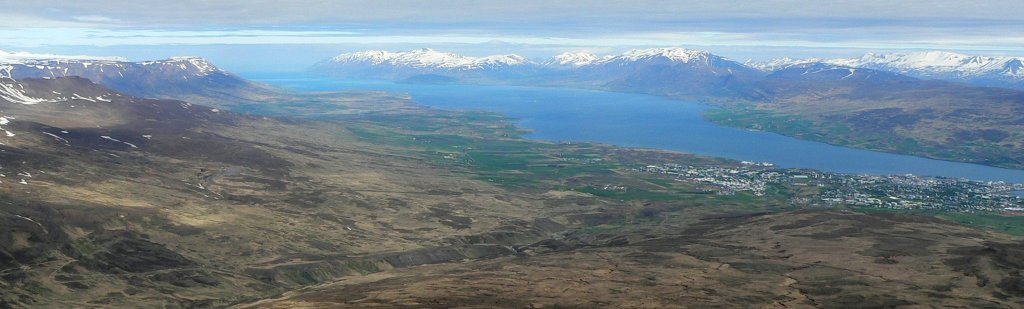
Eyjafjörður and Akureyri in summer

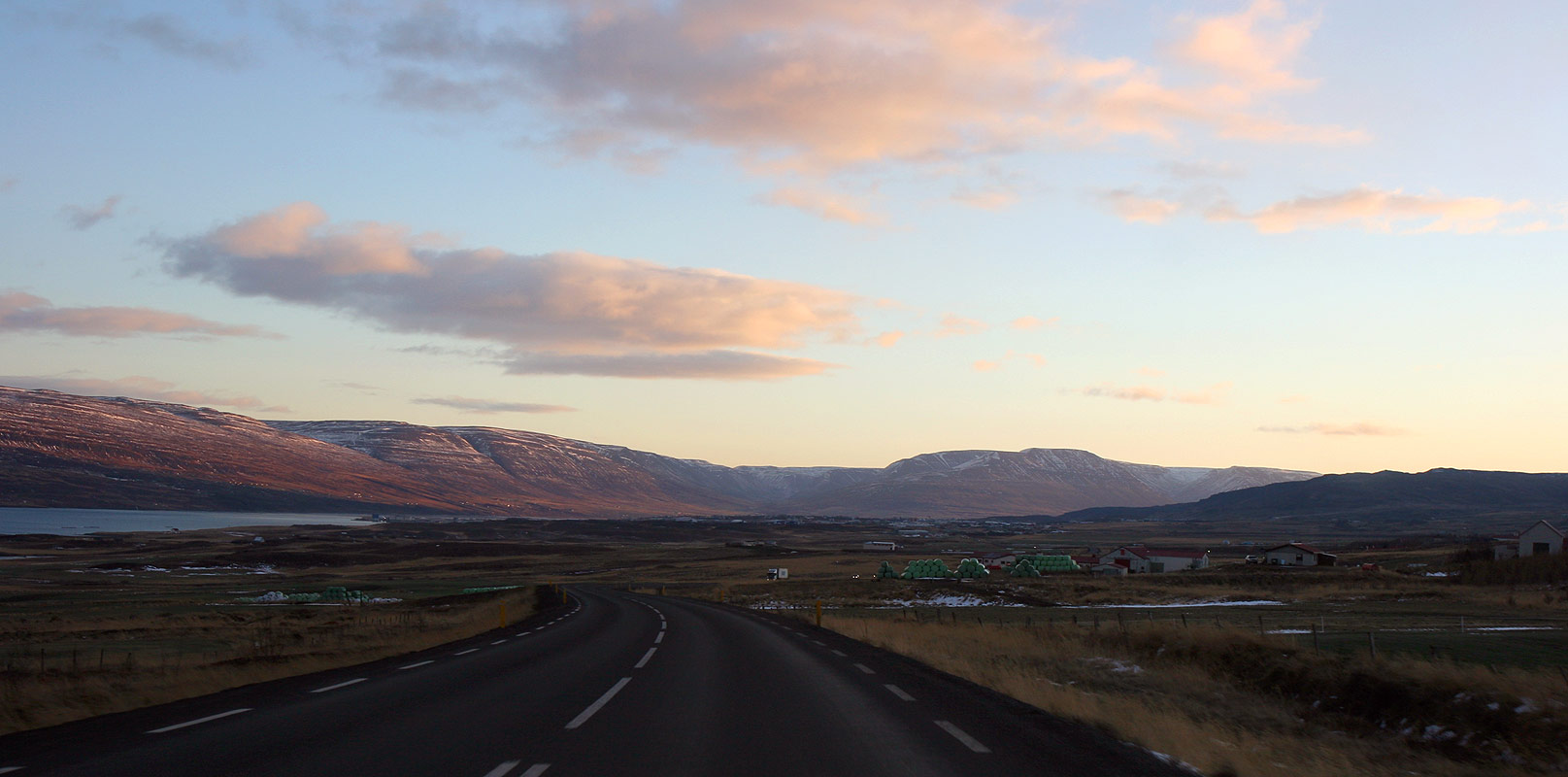
Southeast across Eyjafjörður from the western exit of the Öxnadalsheiði pass

Eyjafjörður (Icelandic pronunciation: [ˈeiːjaˌfjœrðʏr̥], Island Fjord) is one of the longest fjords in Iceland. It is located in the central north of the country. Situated by the fjord is the country's fourth most populous municipality, Akureyri.

== Physical geography ==
The fjord is long and narrow and measures 60 km from its head to its mouth. Its greatest width is 15 km between Ólafsfjörður and Gjögurtá at the fjord's mouth, but for the greater part of its length it is mostly between 5–10 km wide.

The fjord is surrounded by hills and mountains on both sides; the mountains are taller on the west side, in the mountain range of the Tröllaskagi peninsula. In the outer part of the fjord there are no lowlands along the coast as the steep hills roll directly into the sea. Further south in the fjord there are strips of lowland along both coasts; these are wider on the west side.

Several valleys lead from Eyjafjörður: most of them to the west, where the two most significant are Hörgárdalur and Svarfaðardalur. Dalsmynni is the only valley on the east side. However the largest valley in the area is Eyjafjarðardalur, which runs directly south from the fjord itself. It is about 50 km long, and is home to one of Iceland's largest agricultural regions.

Several rivers flow into Eyjafjörður: the most significant are the Eyjafjarðará, Hörgá (whose valleys are named above), and Fnjóská (which flows into the fjord via Dalsmynni).

The island of Hrísey in the middle of Eyjafjörður is the second largest island off the coast of Iceland and often referred to as "The Pearl of Eyjafjörður".

Eyjafjörður contains a number of hydrothermal vents in shallow (20 to 65 metres) water, namely the Strýtan vent field, with cones rising up to 20 metres below the water surface. As they are not visible on the surface, when the Icelandic Coast Guard did not detect the vent chimneys, they declared the vents non-existent in 1987. In 1997 divers Erlendur Bogason and Árni Halldósson and German research submersible HOV JAGO separately explored them and identified them as a real geologic feature. The vent field was designated as an Icelandic protected preserve in 2001.

== Settlements ==
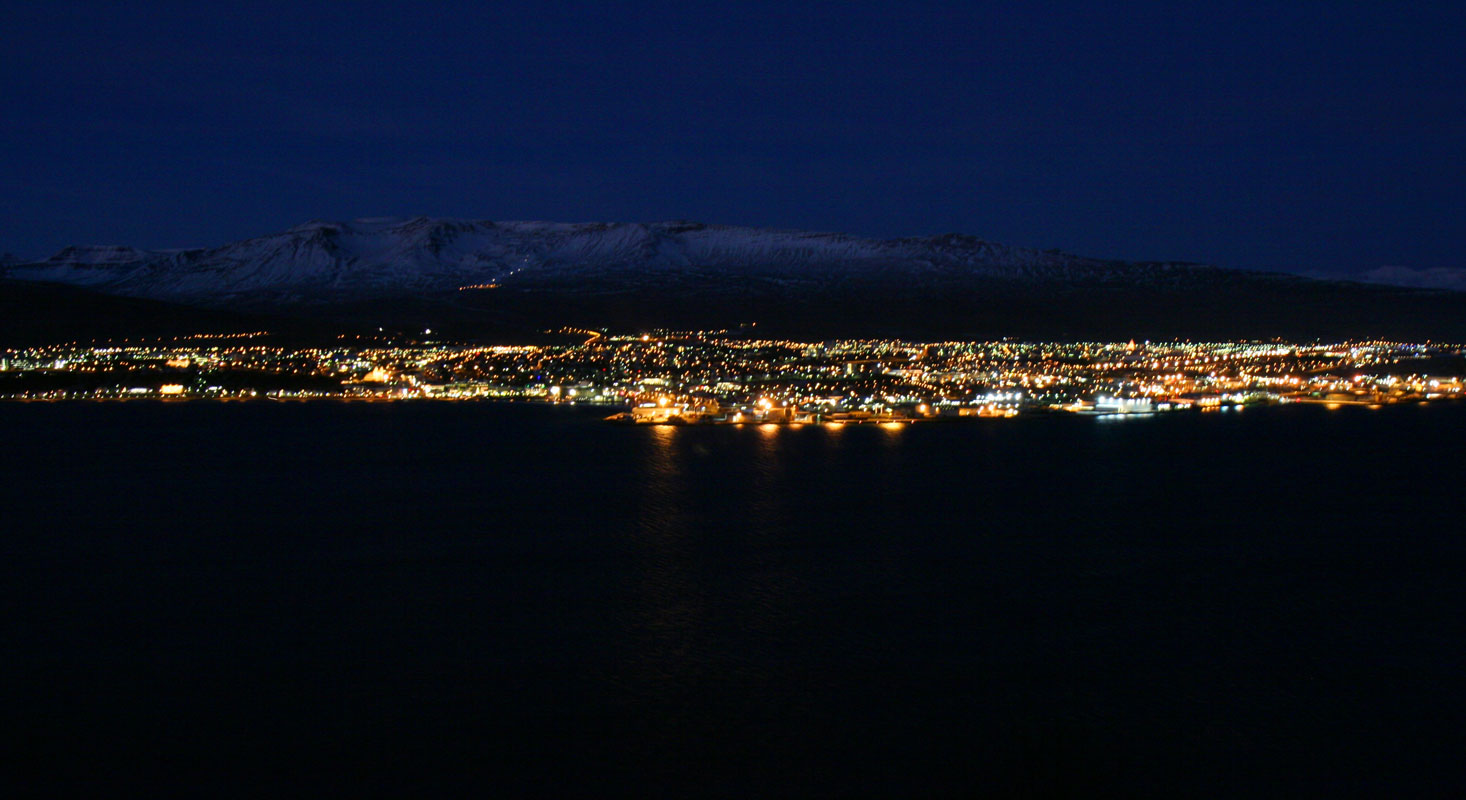
Akureyri, viewed from the eastern shore of Eyjafjörður, morning, November 2007

The largest town by far is Akureyri; other settlements in the region are: Dalvík (the only other settlement with over 1,000 inhabitants), Ólafsfjörður, Hrísey, Árskógssandur, Hauganes, Hjalteyri, Hrafnagil, Svalbarðseyri and Grenivík. Most of these settlements base their livelihood on fisheries and agriculture, but Akureyri is also a service center and the site of a growing university.

== See also ==
- Fjords of Iceland
- Strýtan vent field
