= The Future Ocean =

German research institute

Cluster of Excellence "Future Ocean"
- Exzellenzcluster „Ozean der Zukunft“
- Established: November 2006
- Director: Prof. Dr. Martin Visbeck
- Location: Kiel, Schleswig-Holstein, Germany
- Campus: Christian-Albrechts-Universität zu Kiel
- Website: http://www.futureocean.org/en/index.php

The Future Ocean is a Cluster of Excellence founded in November 2006 in line with the German excellence initiative by the Christian-Albrechts-Universität zu Kiel (CAU), the Muthesius Kunsthochschule (MKHS), the Institut für Weltwirtschaft (IfW) and the Helmholtz-Zentrum für Ozeanforschung (GEOMAR). It is an interdisciplinary marine research group and it is funded by the German Research Foundation (DFG). Part of the cluster is the Integrated School of Ocean Sciences (ISOS) which is a post graduate school for ocean sciences in Kiel.

== Goals ==
The ocean plays an important role in the global climate, holds dangers, but simultaneously provides opportunities not just in the form of exploitable resources but also in many different fields of research. With that in mind the scientists in the cluster "The Future Ocean" have one common goal: to reassess the opportunities and risks of global change for the ocean and to allow a sustainable management of its resources based on these insights.

== First Funding Period ==
Organigram first funding period The Future Ocean

The first funding period started on 1 November 2006 and lasted till 31 October 2012. During this first period of funding the cluster of excellence focused on two major areas of research, Greenhouse Oceans (A) and Resources and Risks (B). Each of them was further divided into seven, respectively, six research teams which in turn were based on different research platforms (P1-P4). The research teams encompassed the Integrated School of Ocean Sciences, the cluster's public outreach program and the transfer of research to application.

=== Greenhouse Oceans ===
The research area Greenhouse Oceans (A) focused on the causes and effects of climate change in regards to the modern ocean. Interactions between the atmosphere, ocean surface, deep water regions and its organisms were closely studied. It was divided into seven research teams. Their members mostly focused on environmental research ranging from topics such as ocean acidification and its impact on marine life to global warming and its influence on the ocean floor to ocean circulation regarding climate modelling and even ocean surface chemistry, studying the exchange of gases between the water column and the atmosphere.

=== Resources and Risks ===
The research area Resources and Risks (B) focused in turn on different resources, their mining and recovery potential but also their sustainable utilization and possible occurring risks. It was divided into six research teams, that focused mostly but not exclusively on economic research ranging from topics such as fishery and the common pool problem to molecular interdependencies within marine organisms for medical research to resource deposits and their safe exploitation and even to submarine hazard research regarding earthquakes and tsunamis.

== Second Funding Period ==
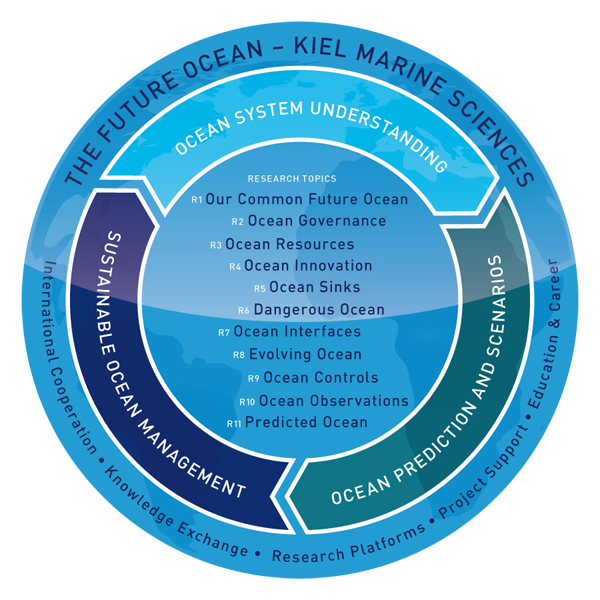
Organigram second funding period The Future Ocean

On 15 June 2012 the funding for the cluster of excellence The Future Ocean was extended by another five years. During this period from 1 November 2012 to 31 October 2017 the former research areas Greenhouse Ocean (A) and Resources and Risks (B) were terminated and replaced by the fully integrated Research Topics (R). There are a total of eleven multidisciplinary R topics. The research platforms and part of the central services were merged into the new science support (S).

The different research topics (R) do not stray very far from the former research areas Greenhouse Ocean (A) and Resources and Risks (B). The team's scientists from the fields of biology, chemistry, computer sciences, economy, ethics, geography, geosciences, law, mathematics, medicine, philosophy, physics and politics pile their combined knowledge into the research for a common, sustainable ocean for the people.

== Governance ==
The cluster developed an operational framework, which has been approved by the General Member Assembly in 2008. The cluster framework defines the decision making process, advisory mechanisms and several core groups.

The General Member Assembly elects the Cluster's director, acting director and members of the Executive Committee. It also votes on new full and associate membership applications. The General Member Assembly meets at least once a year.

The Cluster Council is the assembly of principal investigators and junior research group leaders. It consists currently of 55 members and advises the Executive Committee on research-related matters, overall budget allocations and meets at least twice a year.

The Executive Committee is composed of a number of representatives from various cluster research and science support topics, participating institutions including platforms, the graduate school, junior research groups, the postdoc network, and PhD students. The Executive Committee meets monthly and makes all operational, management and funding decisions of the cluster.

The External Scientific Advisory Board (SAB) is currently composed of 15 national and international experts. The SAB meets in Kiel once a year and provides guidance and advice to the cluster.

The cluster has several international partners, e.g. the Dalhousie University in Halifax, Canada, Columbia University in New York, USA, the Ocean University of China in Quingdao and others.

== See also ==
- BIOACID (Biological Impacts of Ocean Acidification)
- Alfred Wegener Institute for Polar and Marine Research
