= Snorrason Holdings =

Icelandic holding company

- Company type: Privately held
- Industry: Financial services
- Founded: 2003; 23 years ago
- Headquarters: Dalvík, Iceland
- Key people: Björn Snorrason, CEO
- Products: Financial services
- Website: www.snorrason.com

Snorrason Holdings is an Icelandic holding company with primary interests in online payment processing. It also has an Internet marketing division. Its headquarters are in Dalvík, North Iceland.

== History ==
Snorrason Holdings was founded in 2003 by the Snorrason family of Dalvík who are known in Iceland because of the entrepreneurial work of Snorri Snorrason, Snr (1940–2003) who pioneered the shrimp industry in Iceland.

== Divisions ==
The company's divisions include DalPay Internet Billing.
