= List of golf courses in Iceland =

This is a list of golf courses in Iceland.

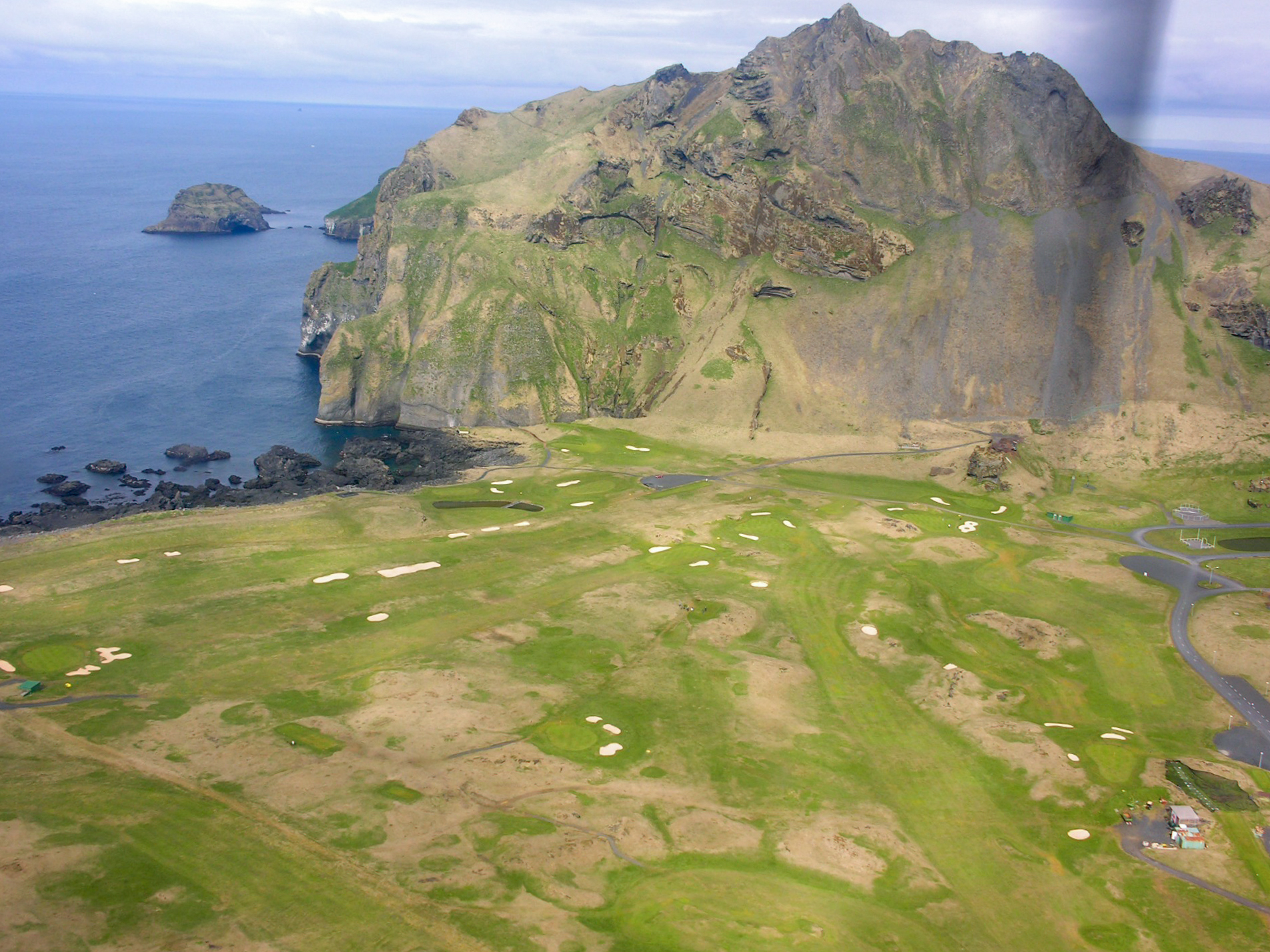
Westman Islands Golf Club

== Courses by region ==
=== Capital Region ===
- Álftaness Golf Club
- Brautarholts Golf Club
- Keilir Golf Club
- Kópavogs/Garðabæjar Golf Club
- Mosfellsbæjar Golf Club
- Nesklúbburinn Golf Club
- Oddur Golf Club
- Reykjavik Golf Club
- Setberg Golf Club

=== Southern Peninsula ===
- Grindavíkur Golf Club
- Sandgerðis Golf Club
- Suðurnesja Golf Club
- Vatnsleysustrandar Golf Club

=== Western Region ===
- Borgarness Golf Club
- Glanni Golf Club
- Húsafelli Golf Club
- Jökull Golf Club
- Leynir Golf Club
- Mostri Golf Club
- Skrifla Golf Club
- Staðarsveitar Golf Club
- Vestarr Golf Club

=== Westfjords ===
- Bíldudals Golf Club
- Bolungarvíkur Golf Club
- Gláma Golf Club
- Hólmavíkur Golf Club
- Ísafjarðar Golf Club
- Patreksfjarðar Golf Club

=== Northwestern Region ===
- Ós Golf Club
- Siglufjarðar Golf Club
- Skagastrandar Golf Club
- Sauðárkróks Golf Club

=== Northeastern Region ===
- Akureyri Golf Club
- Fjallabyggðar Golf Club
- Gljúfri Golf Club
- Hamar Golf Club
- Húsavíkur Golf Club
- Hvammur Grenivík Golf Club
- Lundur Golf Club
- Mývatnssveitar Golf Club
- Vopnafjarðar Golf Club

=== Eastern Region ===
- Byggðarholts Golf Club
- Fjarðarbyggðar Golf Club
- Fljótsdalshéraðs Golf Club
- Hornafjarðar Golf Club
- Norðfjarðar Golf Club
- Seyðisfjarðar Golf Club

=== Southern Region ===
- Ásatúns Golf Club
- Dalbúi Golf Club
- Geysir Golf Club
- Flúðir Golf Club
- Hellu Golf Club
- Hveragerðis Golf Club
- Kiðjaberg Golf Club
- Öndverðarness Golf Club
- Selfoss Golf Club
- Tuddi Golf Club
- Úthlíð Golf Club
- Vík Golf Club
- Westman Islands Golf Club
- Þorlákshafnar Golf Club
- Þverá Hellishólum Golf Club
