= Hörgárdalur =

Valley in Hörgársveit, Iceland

Coordinates: 65.621733°N 18.608889°W

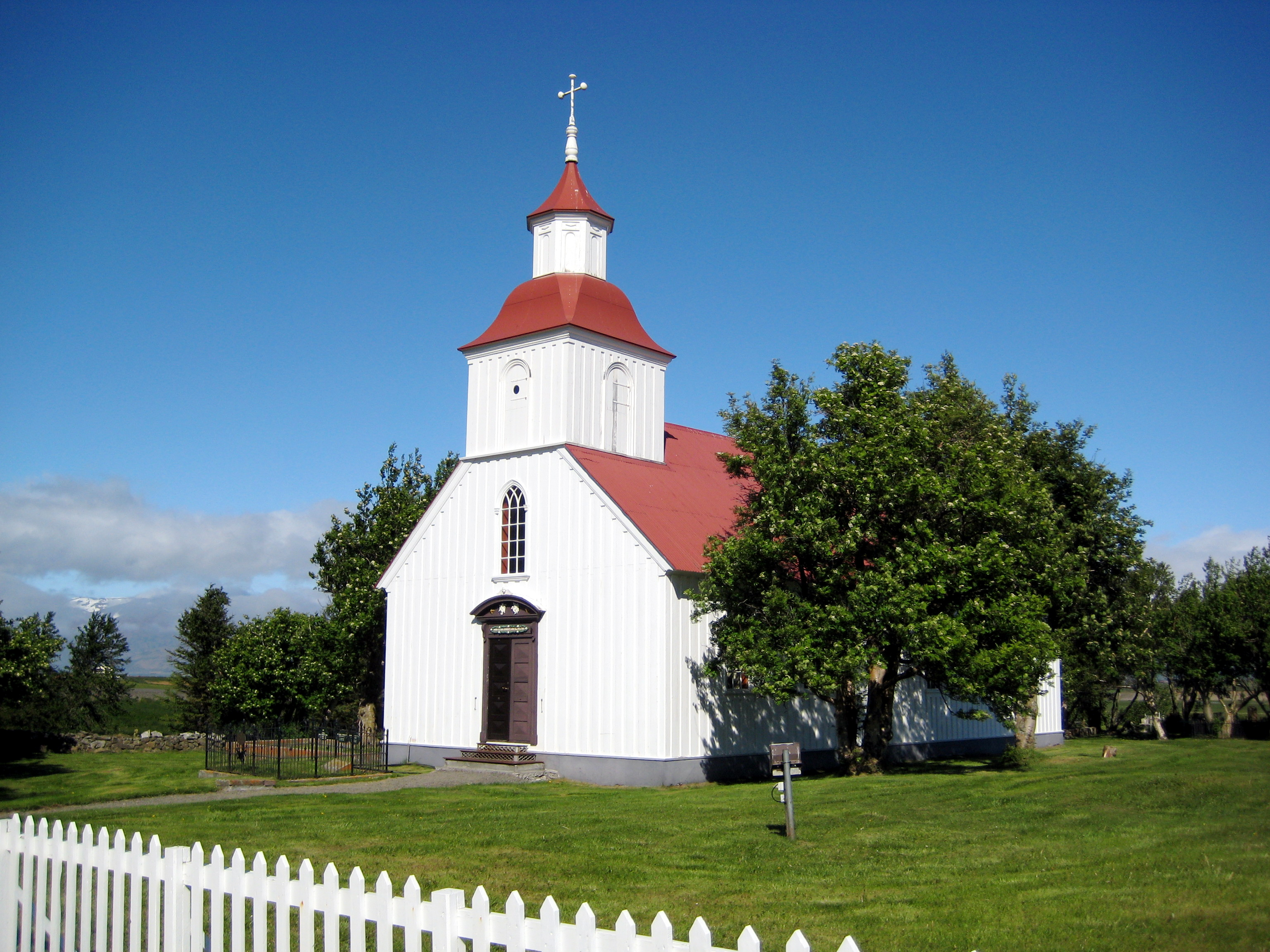
19th-century church at Möðruvellir

Hörgárdalur (Icelandic pronunciation: [ˈhœrkˌaurˌtaːlʏr̥]) is a valley in north Iceland, the valley of the river Hörgá. It is 30 kilometres (19 mi) long and extends southwest from Eyjafjörður, which it meets inland. It is now part of the municipality of Hörgársveit.

The valley is wide and fertile at its mouth until its intersection with Öxnadalur; the area on the east side of the river here is known as Þelamörk (Thelamörk). The rest of the valley is narrow and has little flat land, running between high mountains. On the west side they reach 1,500 metres (4,900 ft), and in the Drangafjall ridge dividing the valley from Öxnadalur, the pointed peak of Hraundrangi (lava column) stands out. The main intersecting valleys in the interior are Barkárdalur and Myrkárdalur.

West of Akureyri, the Ring Road follows the valley for 10 kilometres (6.2 mi) and then continues through Öxnadalur.

== Flögusel ==
Flögusel [ˈflœːɣʏˌsɛːl̥] was the first farm in the valley; south of that point, the valley turns more to the west. A road up from there west across the heath was previously a common route to Hólar, which is in Hjaltadalur.

== Grjótá ==
The farm of Grjótá [ˈkrjouːtˌauː] was the birthplace in 1161 of Bishop Guðmundur Arason.

== Möðruvellir in Hörgárdalur ==
The historical main settlement in the valley is Möðruvellir [ˈmœðrʏˌvɛtlɪr̥], at its northeastern end, which was the site of an Augustinian monastery, founded in 1296, and of one of Iceland's first academic secondary schools, founded in 1880; the school moved to Akureyri after a fire in 1902 and is now Akureyri Junior College. There is a church built in 1865–67 and an agricultural research station. Möðruvellir was the birthplace of Jón Sveinsson and of Hannes Hafstein, and also of Valtýr Stefánsson (1893–1963), the editor of Morgunblaðið. (Note: Several farms and settlements in Iceland have been called Möðruvellir; in particular, Möðruvellir in Hörgárdal should be distinguished from the nearby Möðruvellir in Eyjafjarðarsveit, after which the manuscript Möðruvallabók was named.)

== Skuggi ==
Skuggi [ˈskʏcːɪ] is the site of a Viking Age tenant farm that has been investigated by archaeologists in association with the Icelandic Archaeological Institute (Fornleifastofnun Íslands) for information on economic relationships in that era, in particular with Möðruvellir and the trading settlement of Gásir, in Eyjafjörður.
