= List of botanical gardens in Iceland =

Botanical gardens in Iceland have collections consisting entirely of Iceland native and endemic species; most have a collection that include plants from around the world.

- Akureyri Botanical Garden, Akureyri
- Grasagarður Reykjavíkur, Reykjavík
- Skrúður Botanical Garden, Bolungarvik - oldest botanical garden in Iceland, established in 1909
- Herbal Gardens of Nes, Seltjarnarnes - medicinal and culinary garden about the history of herbal medicine
