= Ásthildur Sturludóttir =

Icelandic politician (born 1974)

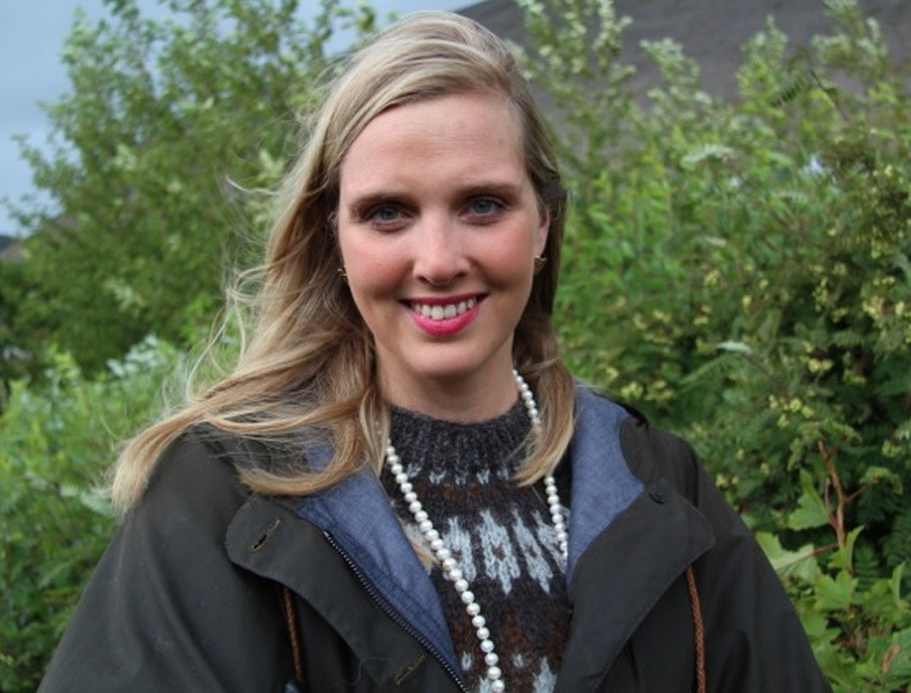

13th Mayor of Akureyri
- Incumbent
- Assumed office 2018
- Preceded by: Eiríkur Björn Björgvinsson

Personal details
- Born: 10 June 1974 (age 51)

Ásthildur Sturludóttir (born 10 June 1974) is the current mayor of the Icelandic city of Akureyri and has held the position since 2018.

== Personal life ==
Ásthildur was raised in Stykkishólmur on the Snæfellsnes Peninsula. Her father is Sturla Böðvarsson, was formerly the mayor of Stykkishólmur, Minister of Transport, and served as President of the Althing from 2007 to 2009. Her mother is Hallgerður Gunnarsdóttir, a lawyer. Her husband is Hafþór Gylfi Jónsson from Patreksfjörður. Together they have two children.

== Education and career ==
Ásthildur holds a BA in Political Science from the University of Iceland and an MPA in Public Administration from PACE University in New York.

She previously worked as a project manager in the Rector's Office and Marketing and Communications Department at the University of Iceland. She was also a project manager in the construction of Harpa Concert Hall and Conference Centre, managing director of the Association of Municipalities in West Iceland and a professional consultant at SSV Development and Consulting.

She took over as Mayor of Akureyri in 2018 after serving as Mayor of Vesturbyggð in the Westfjords for eight years.
