= Glerárkirkja =

Church in Akureyri, Iceland

Coordinates: 65.6927°N 18.1330°W

- Glerárkirkja
- Denomination: Church of Iceland

Architecture
- Architect: Svan Eiríksson
- Years built: 1984–1992

Specifications
- Materials: Concrete

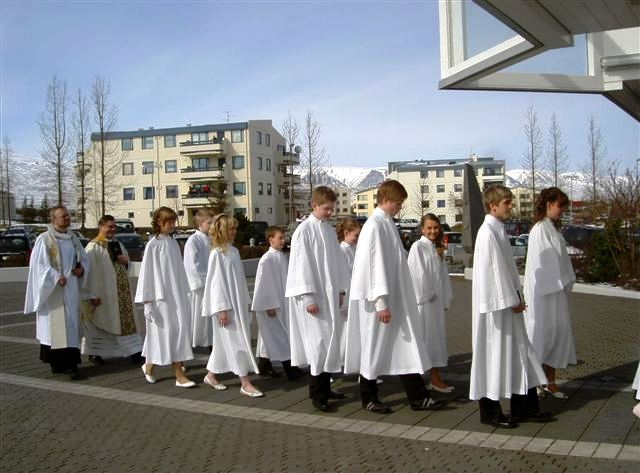
A priest and confirmands walk to church in Glerárkirkja in 2007

Glerárkirkja (Icelandic pronunciation: [ˈklɛːrˌaurˌcʰɪr̥ca]) is a church in Akureyri, Iceland. It is a parish church of the Evangelical Lutheran Church of Iceland. In 1969 a building committee was formed to find a place for a new church for the neighborhood. Lögmannshlíðarkirkja [ˈlœɣˌmansˌl̥iːðarˌcʰɪr̥ca], the previous church dated to 1860, was deemed as too small for the congregation. Lögmannshlíðarkirkja is well maintained today and occasionally performs ecclesiastical ceremonies.

Architect Svan Eiríksson provided the design of Glerárkirkja. The new church covers an area of 2100 m2 of which the lower floor is about 1000 m2. The first mass was on 18 August 1985 and the church was consecrated on 15 February 1987. In 1989, steel cladding was put on the roof. The church was then expanded in 2002 and re-dedicated on 6 December 2002.
