= Akureyri Hospital =

Hospital in Akureyri, Iceland

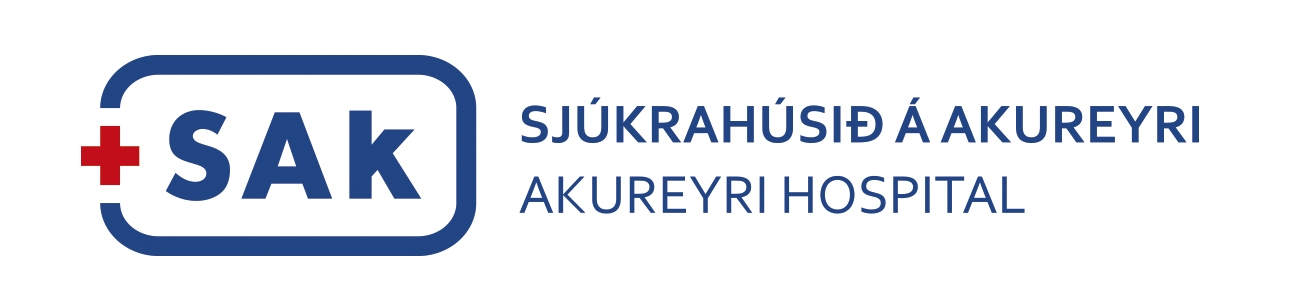

Geography
- Location: Akureyri, Iceland
- Coordinates: 65.6736°N 18.0933°W

Services
- Emergency department: Yes

Helipads
- Helipad: Yes

Links
- Website: sak.is

Akureyri Hospital (Icelandic: Sjúkrahúsið á Akureyri) is a hospital in Akureyri, Iceland. Alongside Landspítali, it is one of the two specialty hospitals in Iceland, providing both general and specialised care. Akureyri Hospital operates an emergency department, intensive care unit, maternity ward, paediatric clinic, and various other specialised departments. It also functions as a centre for Icelandic air ambulance services.

== History ==
Designed by architect Guðjón Samúelsson, construction on the hospital began in the summer of 1946 and was completed in 1948. However, the first patients were not admitted until 15 December 1953.

The first COVID-19 patient in North Iceland was diagnosed on 15 March 2020. By 25 March, the hospital had reorganised its facilities to prepare for the pandemic, establishing a ten-bed infectious disease ward by converting half of its paediatric unit. The hospital also ordered two ventilators to supplement their existing three. By 1 April, six people had been admitted to the inpatient COVID-19 ward and the hospital decided to also open an outpatient COVID-19 ward. In October 2020, Akureyri Hospital implemented more precautions after a rapid increase in infections in northeastern Iceland. A temporary ban on hospital visits, with limited humanitarian exceptions, was introduced, and certain elective procedures were reduced. Akureyri Hospital had been conducting its own COVID-19 PCR analysis for over a year as of December 2021, processing tests from across North Iceland, with a reported daily capacity of 1,800 samples. Due to a relatively lower infection rate compared to the south, they stated they were prepared to assist Landspítali with their testing. The hospital recorded its first COVID-19 death in February 2022. Management reported operational strain due to 60 employee absences caused by isolation requirements, prompting calls for people to sign up for the reserve force. In August 2022, Akureyri Hospital operated under an elevated alert level for nearly two weeks, with most wards reported to be overcrowded. Contributing factors included staffing shortages, increased patient volumes linked to tourism, record-breaking air ambulance activity, and the temporary failure of a CT scanner.

In November 2025, concerns were raised about staffing challenges at Akureyri Hospital following the planned termination of contracts for specialist physicians. The Ministry of Health stated that the contracts may not have complied with labour laws, while the chairwoman of the Icelandic Medical Association, Steinunn Þórðardóttir, warned the loss of specialist staff could disrupt hospital services, noting long-standing staffing issues. The following month, the hospital was significantly strained due to an influenza outbreak. Mandatory mask requirements were introduced in three departments to limit in-hospital transmission, while several patients were reportedly transferred to Landspítali due to insufficient staffing.

== Facilities and operations ==
Akureyri Hospital, alongside Landspítali, are the two specialty hospitals in Iceland, providing both general and specialised care. It also coordinates with rural healthcare facilities and functions as a centre for Iceland's air ambulance services. The hospital dispatches its physicians for air ambulances, while the aircraft and flight crew are operated by Mýflug. Akureyri has a maternity ward; 491 babies were born there in 2021.
