= Jón Sveinsson =

Icelandic children's writer (1857–1944)

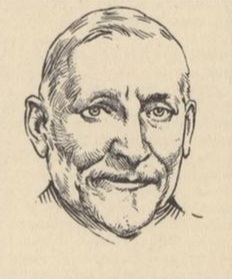
- Born: November 16, 1857; Möðruvellir in Hörgárdalur, Iceland
- Died: October 16, 1944 (aged 86); Cologne, Germany
- Occupation: Children's writer

Jón Stefán Sveinsson, SJ, better known as Nonni (16 November 1857 – 16 October 1944), was an Icelandic children's writer and member of the Society of Jesus.

He left Iceland in 1870 for France, where he converted to Catholicism.

His children's stories concerning a character named Nonni are well known in Iceland and parts of Europe. Nonni's House (Nonnahús), his childhood home in Akureyri, is now a museum dedicated to his life and work, and he has been featured on postage stamps. Jón Sveinsson's stories of growing up with his brother Ármann, nicknamed "Manni", were adapted into an Icelandic-West German television series Nonni and Manni.

== Bibliography ==
Titles are currently listed in German.

- Nonni ISBN 3-423-70044-0
- Nonni und Manni ISBN 3-932426-25-8
- Sonnentage
- Die Stadt am Sund ISBN 3-451-19722-7
- Abenteuer auf den Inseln
- Auf Skipalon
- Nonni erzählt
- Zwischen Eis und Feuer
- Wie Nonni das Glück fand ISBN 3-932426-26-6
- Aus Island. Erlebnisse und Erinnerungen. Freiburg, Herder 1913
- Die Feuerinsel im Nordmeer
- Nonnis Reise um die Welt Band 1: Nonni in Amerika Band 2: Nonni in Japan
