= Helgi Magri =

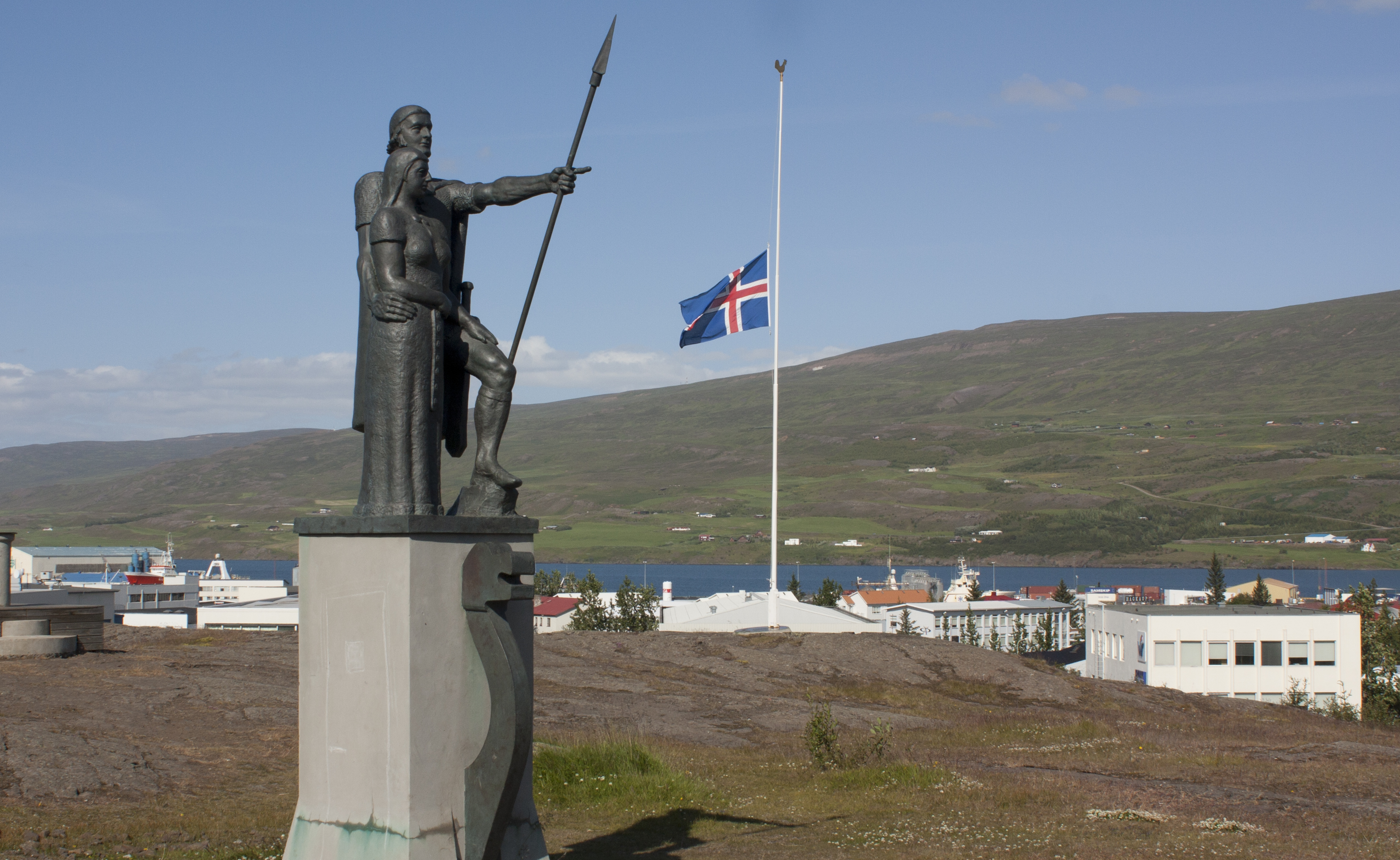
Helgi Magri and Thórunn Hyrna, statue in Akureyri

Helgi Magri (Helgi “magri” (The Lean) Eyvindarson) is recorded in the Book of the Settlements as being one of the founding settlers of Iceland. He was a son of the Swede Eyvindur Bjarnason and the Irish princess Rafarta. He was born in Dublin and fostered on the Hebrides. When his parents came to collect him his thin status led to him henceforth being known as Helgi the skinny . He married a Norwegian Thórunn Hyrna. Helgi is noted for respecting both the Christian teachings and those of the old god Thor. He landed and settled in the North of Iceland in Eyjafjörður near Akureyri.

William Norman (2017) quotes Hermann Pálsson (1996, 94–95) as suggesting that Helgi’s nickname might have been a mistranslating of the Irish name Magor adopted at baptism. He also notes that the opening parts of Laxdœla saga, Eyrbyggja saga and Grettis saga refer to Helgi Magri’s mother and grandfather, the Irish king Kjarvalr (Eyrbyggja saga, 4; Grettis saga, 8–14; Lax, 3; cf. Hermann Pálsson 1996, 119–27 and 219; Land, 248–51).
