= Hraundrangi =

Mountain in Iceland

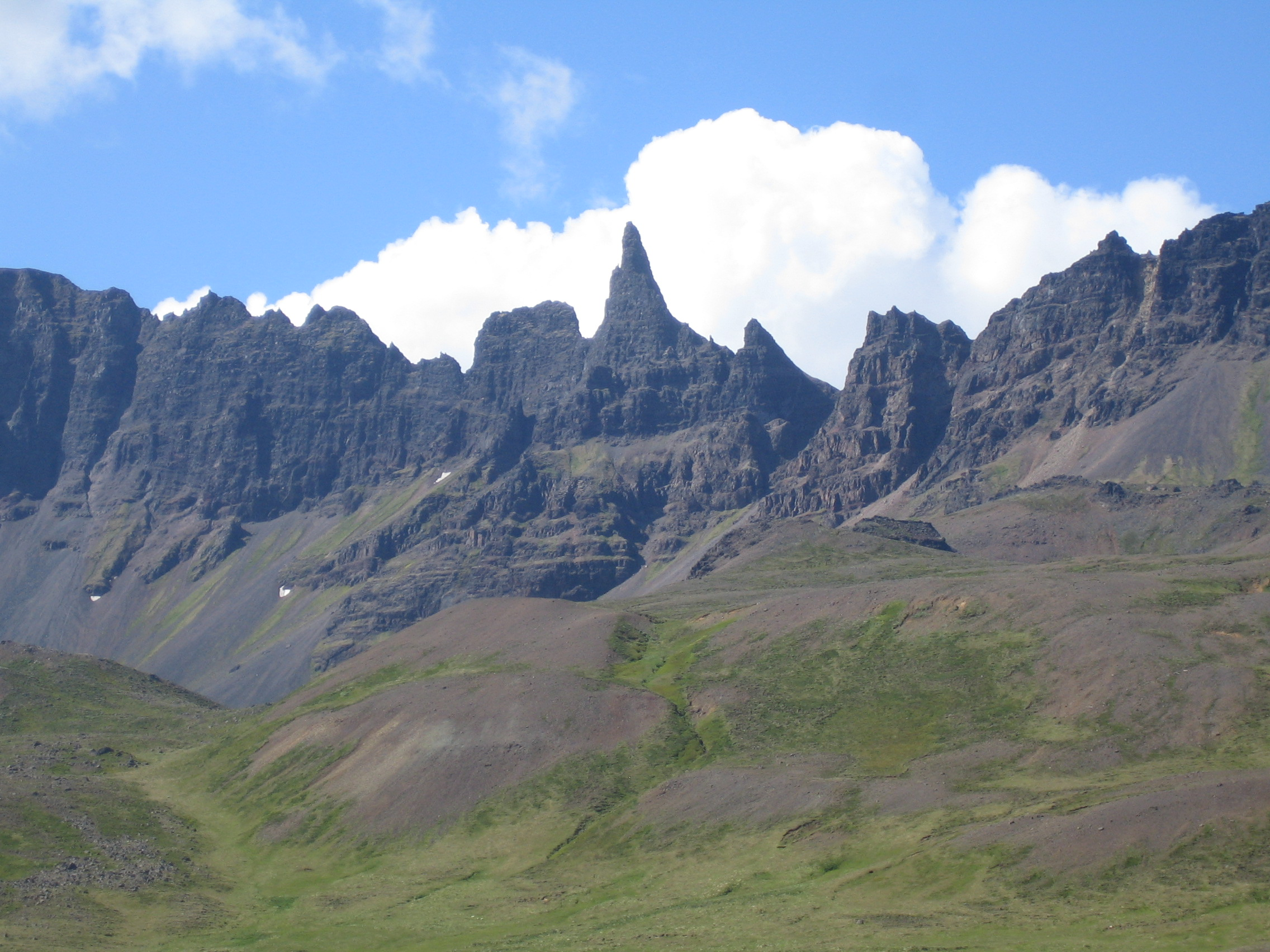
- Hraundrangi (centre), photographed from Öxnadalur in June 2007

Highest point
- Elevation: 1,075 m (3,527 ft)
- Coordinates: 65°35′24″N 18°35′43″W

Geography
- Location within Iceland

Climbing
- First ascent: 1956 by Finnur Eyjólfsson, Sigurður Waage, Nicholas Clinch

Hraundrangi (Icelandic pronunciation: [ˈr̥œynˌtrauɲcɪ], Lava Column or Rockfall Spire) is a conical peak in the Drangafjall ridge dividing Öxnadalur from Hörgárdalur in north Iceland. It rises to 1,075 metres (3,527 ft) above sea level, 80 metres (260 ft) above the ridge. It was probably originally named simply "Drangi" and acquired the prefix from the farm of Hraun, which lies below it on the Öxnadalur side. The ridge is often erroneously referred to as Hraundrangar, the plural of Hraundrangi.

The mountain rises to an unusually sharp point, less than half a square metre at the peak. It is a lava spire that remains with the rest of the ridge after much of the original mountain, Háafjall, fell in a large rockslide many centuries ago.

The first successful ascent of Hraundrangi was on 5 August 1956, by Finnur Eyjólfsson and Sigurður Waage of the Icelandic Air Ground Rescue Team and United States Air Force Lieutenant Nicholas Clinch. A legend that a treasure chest would be found on the peak proved untrue.

The mountain features in "Ferðalok" ("Journey's End"), a poem written at the end of his life by Jónas Hallgrímsson, who was born at Hraun. The last stanza of the poem alludes to a legend that the saga hero Grettir the Strong climbed it and left his knife and belt on the peak as proof; Hraundrangi was supposedly also called Grettisnúpa" ([ˈkrɛhtɪsˌnuːpa], "Grettir's Crag") by the people of Öxnadalur.

The 10,000 Icelandic krónur banknote issued in October 2013 honours Jónas Hallgrímsson and has on the obverse a background image of Hraundrangi and the rest of the ridge formed out of neologisms coined by the poet.
