= Nonni's House =

Museum in Iceland

Coordinates: 65.667086°N 18.0861°W

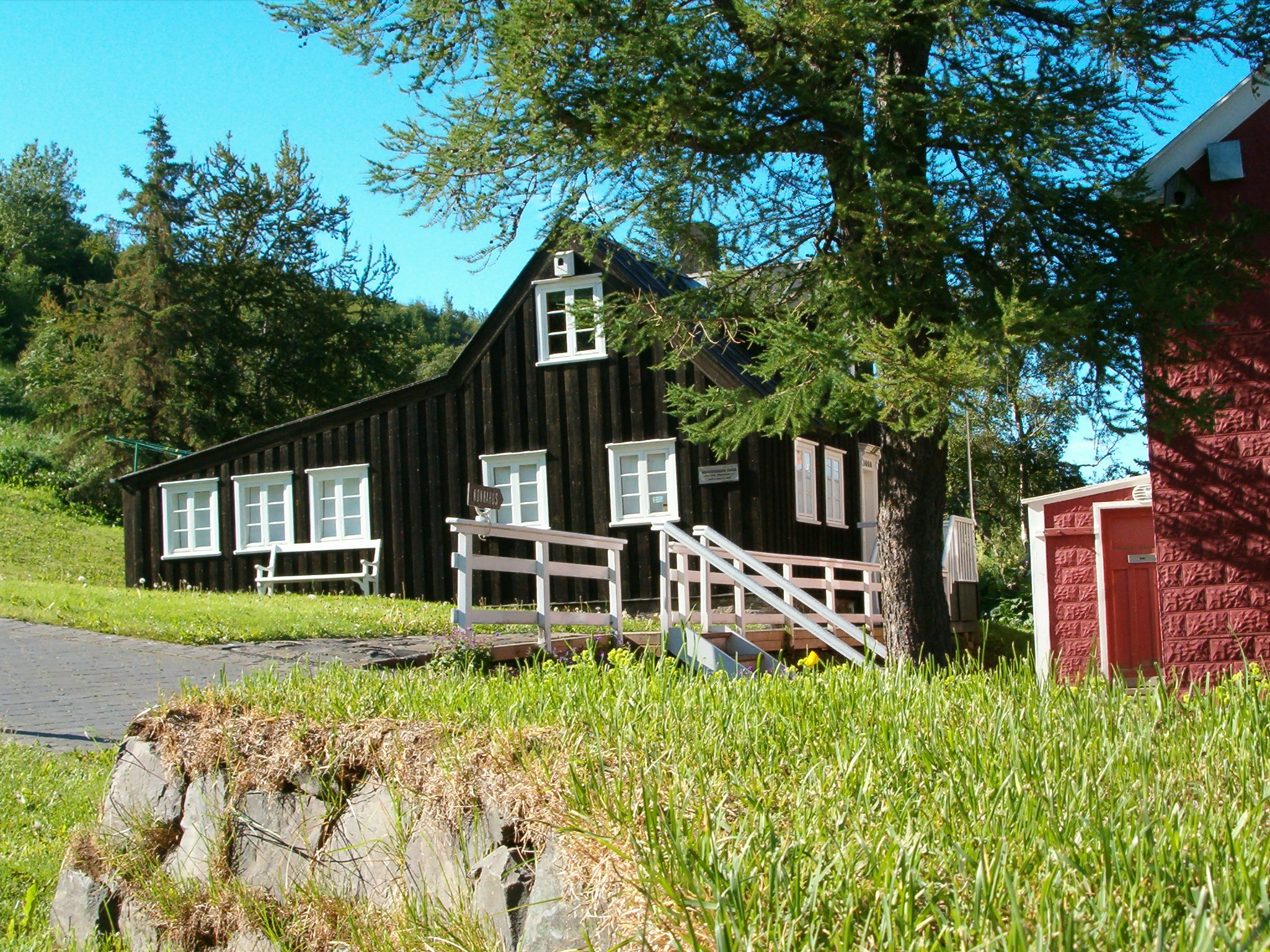
Nonni's House

Nonni's House (Icelandic: Nonnahús [ˈnɔnːaˌhuːs]) is a museum in the Akureyri municipality in Iceland. The small wooden house, built around 1850, is one of the oldest houses in Akureyri. It was the home of the well known children's author and Jesuit priest Jón Sveinsson; also known as "Nonni". The museum was started in 1957 by the Zonta Club but they gave it to the Akureyri municipality in 2008. The museum has many of Sveinsson and his family's personal items.

== History ==
Sveinsson moved into the house with his family at the age of seven in 1865. He moved away at age twelve to attend school in France.

In 1957 one of the founders of the Zonta Club, Anna S. Snorradóttir, spoke to the owners of Nonnahús about her desire to restore the building and turn it into a museum. The owners donated the house to the Zonta Club, who ran the museum from 1957 to 2007. In 2008 they gave ownership of the museum to the town of Akureyri.

== Description and contents ==
One of the display cases at Nonnahús

Nonnahús is made of wood, with a black exterior and white window frames. It was constructed to keep heat in, with low ceilings and narrow doorways. Much of the house's original furniture is preserved.

The museum houses many of Sveinsson's belongings, as well as those of his mother and younger brother Manni. On display are items such as his psalm book, portrait photos of him and his family, Sveinsson's travel chest, and a journal kept by Manni. There are transcriptions of correspondence between Sveinsson and Manni in both Icelandic and English. Nonnahús has several editions of Sveinsson's books on display, translated into many different languages. Illustrations from his books are also displayed. The garden contains old Icelandic children's toys and games made from sticks, stones, and sheep bones.

In front of the museum is a 2.5 metres (8.2 ft) tall statue of Jón Sveinsson made by sculptor Nína Sæmundsson. Previously, the statue had been located outside the Reykjavík city library but was moved sometime during the 1970s, after which it went missing. It was later found intact in a box in Korpúlfsstaðir's hayloft, then cast in bronze and placed outside of the Nonnahús museum in 1994.
