= Akureyri =

- Town and Municipality
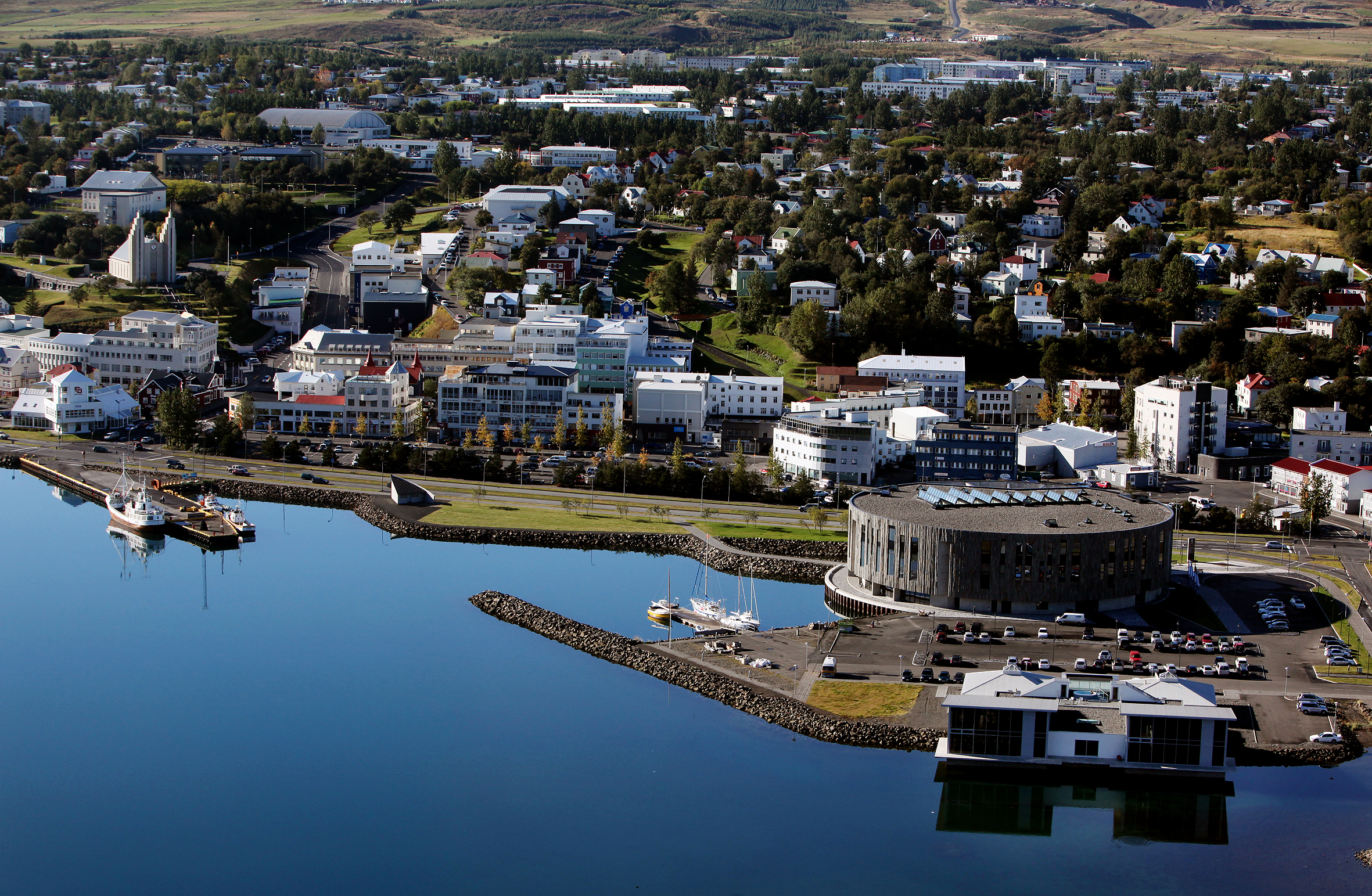
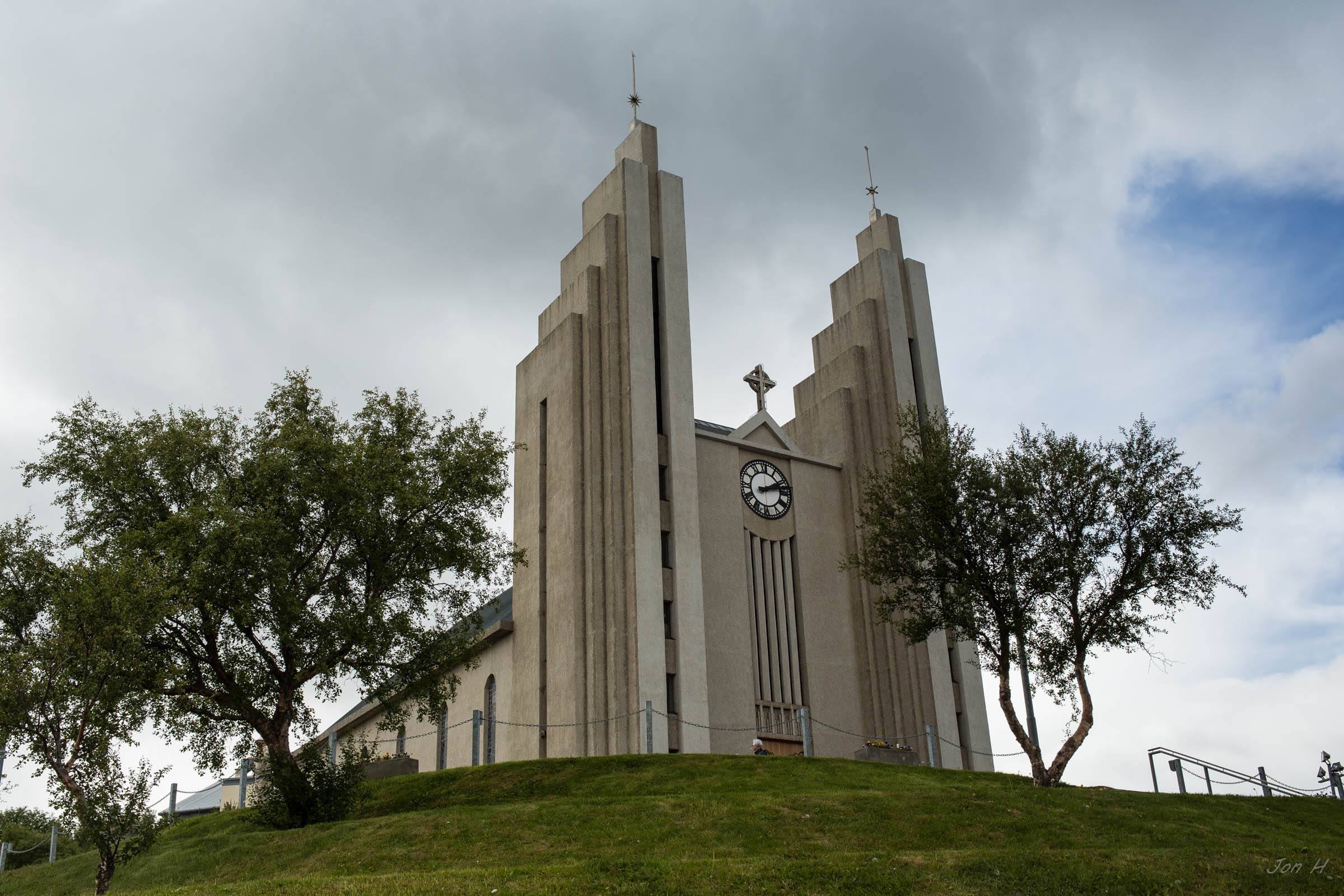
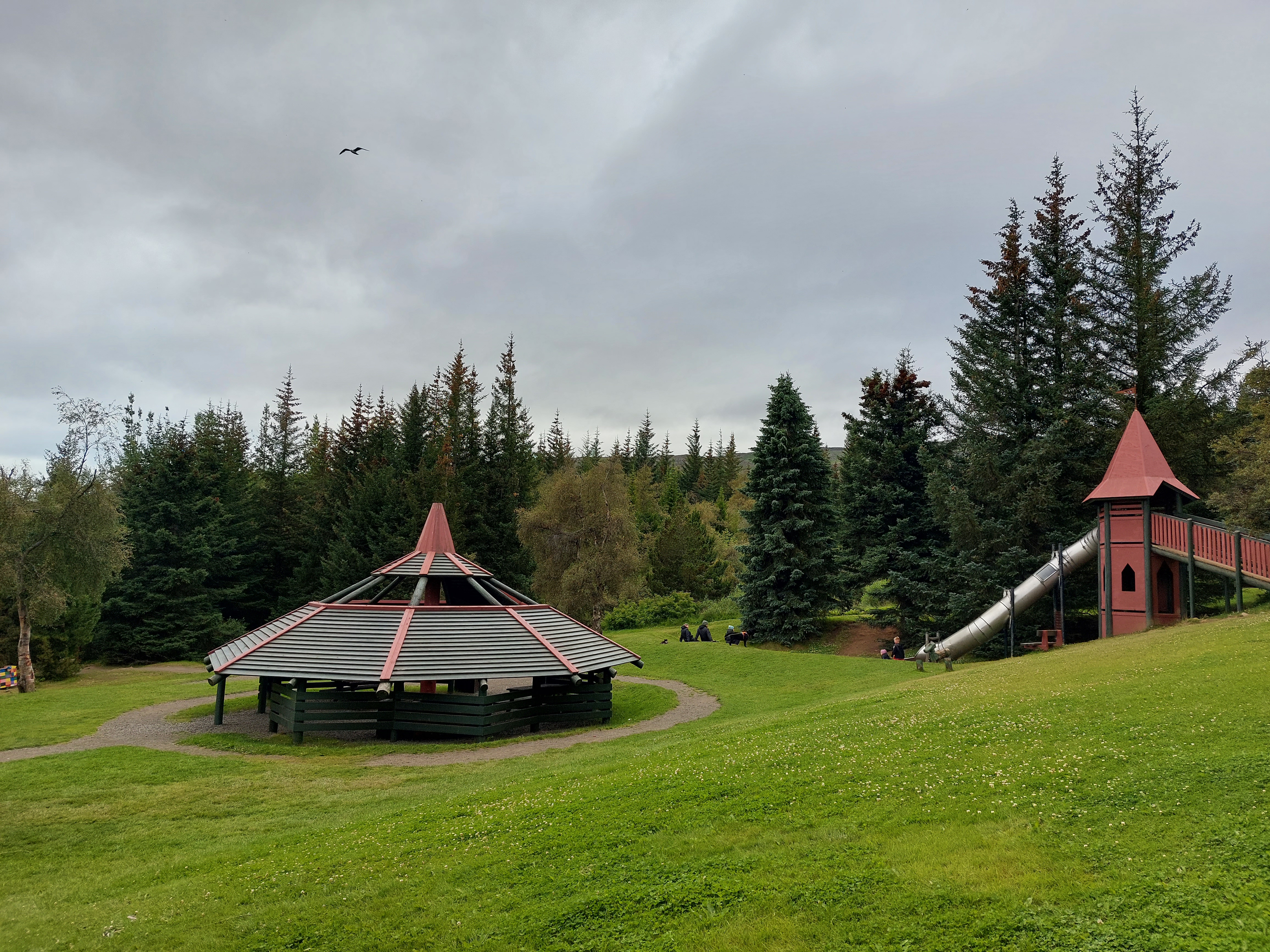
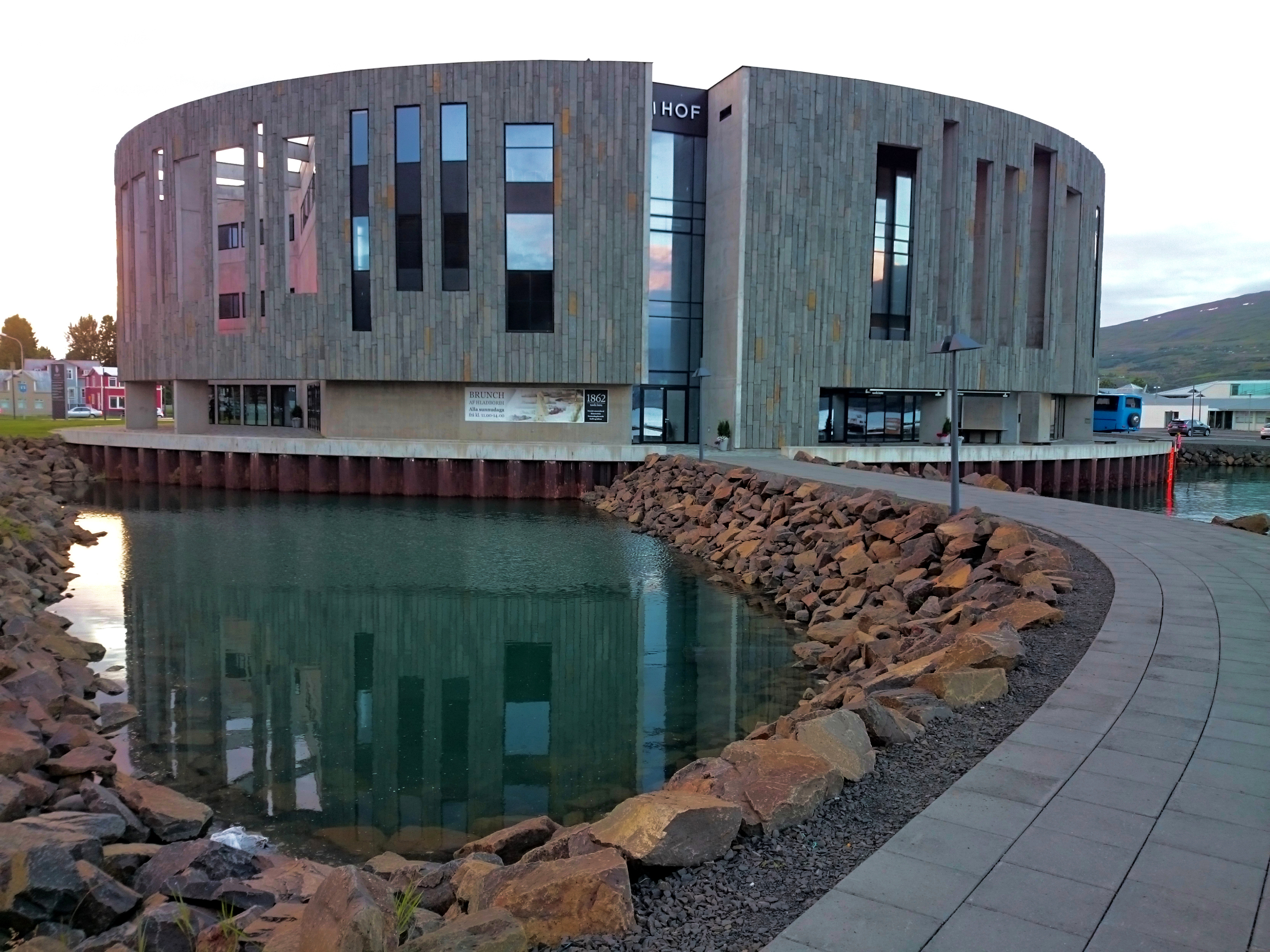
- Aerial view of downtown Akureyri Akureyrarkirkja Kjarnaskogur Hof Cultural and Conference Center
- Nickname: "Capital of North Iceland"
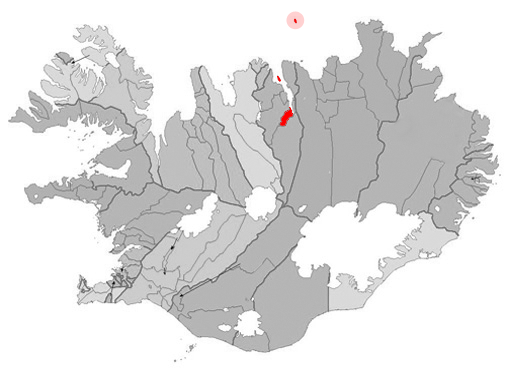
- Location of the Akureyri Municipality

- Location within Iceland
- Country: Iceland
- Region: Northeastern Region
- Constituency: Northeast Constituency

Government
  - Mayor: Ásthildur Sturludóttir

Area
  - Total: 138 km^{2} (53 sq mi)

Population (2026)
  - Total: 20,284
  - Density: 145/km^{2} (380/sq mi)
- Demonym(s): Akureyringur, Akureyringar (Icelandic)
- Postal code(s): 600, 601, 602, 603, 611, 630
- Municipal number: 6000
- Website: akureyri.is

Akureyri (Icelandic pronunciation: [ˈaːkʏrˌeiːrɪ], locally [ˈaːkʰʏrˌeiːrɪ]) is a town in northern Iceland, the country's fifth most populous municipality (under the official name of Akureyrarbær [-ˌeiːrarˌpaiːr̥], 'town of Akureyri') and the largest outside the Capital Region. The municipality includes the town's neighbourhood at the head of Eyjafjörður and two farther islands: Hrísey at the mouth of Eyjafjörður and Grímsey off the coast.

Nicknamed the "Capital of North Iceland", Akureyri is an important port and fishing centre. The area where Akureyri is located was settled in the 9th century, but did not receive a municipal charter until 1786. Allied units were based in the town during World War II. Further growth occurred after the war as the Icelandic population increasingly moved to urban areas. The area has a relatively mild climate because of geographical factors, and the town's ice-free harbour has played a significant role in its history.

== History ==
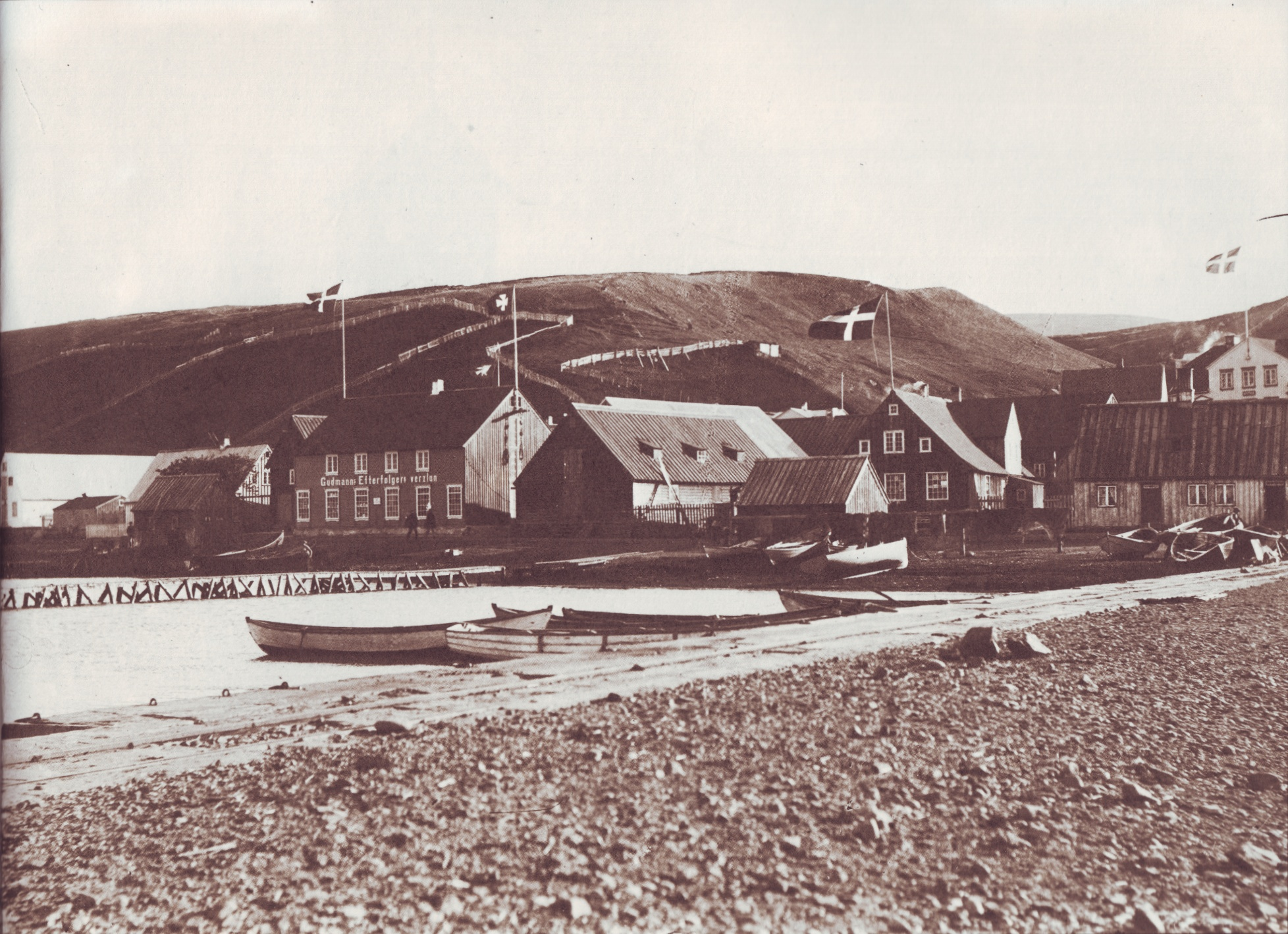
Akureyri in the late 19th century

The Norse Viking Helgi magri (the slim) Eyvindarson originally settled the area in the 9th century. The first mention of Akureyri is in court records from 1562, when a woman was sentenced there for adultery. In the 17th century, Danish merchants based their camps at the current site of Akureyri, which was one of the numerous spits of land in Pollurinn. The main reasons for choosing this spot for trading operations were the outstanding natural harbour and the fertility of the area. The merchants did not live at Akureyri year-round, but returned home in the winter.

Permanent settlement at Akureyri started in 1778, and eight years later, the town was granted its municipal charter by the king, Christian VII, along with five other towns in Iceland. The king hoped to improve the living conditions of Icelanders by this action, because at the time, Iceland had never had urban areas. As far as the king was concerned, Akureyri was unsuccessful, because it did not grow from its population of 12. It lost its municipal status in 1836, regaining it only in 1862. From then on, Akureyri grew because of the excellent port conditions and perhaps more because of the productive agricultural region around it. Agricultural products became an important sector of the economy.

During World War II, Akureyri was one of three air bases used by the Norwegian-British No. 330 Squadron RNoAF. The squadron, which was formed on 25 April 1941, flew Northrop N-3PB bombers: 'A' flight was based at RAF Reykjavik, 'B' flight at Akureyri and 'C' flight at Budareyri (Reyðarfjörður now). On 1 December 1940, 'A' and 'B' flights ceased operating from Norwegian bases, but 'C' flight continued to fly Northrop N-3PBs from Akureyri until 5 April 1943. No. 330 Squadron RNoAF also operated Catalina flying boats from Akureyri, which protected convoys between the United States, the United Kingdom, and Murmansk in northern Russia from attack by German submarines. Under the German plan for invasion of Iceland, Operation Ikarus, Akureyri was scheduled as one of two ports at which the Germans were to land.

In the 20th century, Iceland experienced an exodus from the countryside to the towns. Commerce and service industries grew to be the primary employers in Akureyri in the 1990s. Jón Sveinsson, a popular author of children's books, grew up in Akureyri; his childhood home is now a museum.

In the early 21st century, fishing industries have become more important in Akureyri as two of the major fishing companies of Iceland have become a more important source of revenue and are expected to grow further in coming years. The University of Akureyri was founded in 1987 and is growing rapidly.

Since 2004, the former municipality of Hrísey, an island 35 km (22 mi) to the north, has been a part of Akureyri. Hrísey, which has a population of 210, is the second-largest island off Iceland and is a site for pet and livestock quarantine. The settlement was previously the site of fishing processing. The town is located on the southern part of the island. The northern part consists of privately owned land that requires passes to enter.

== Geography ==
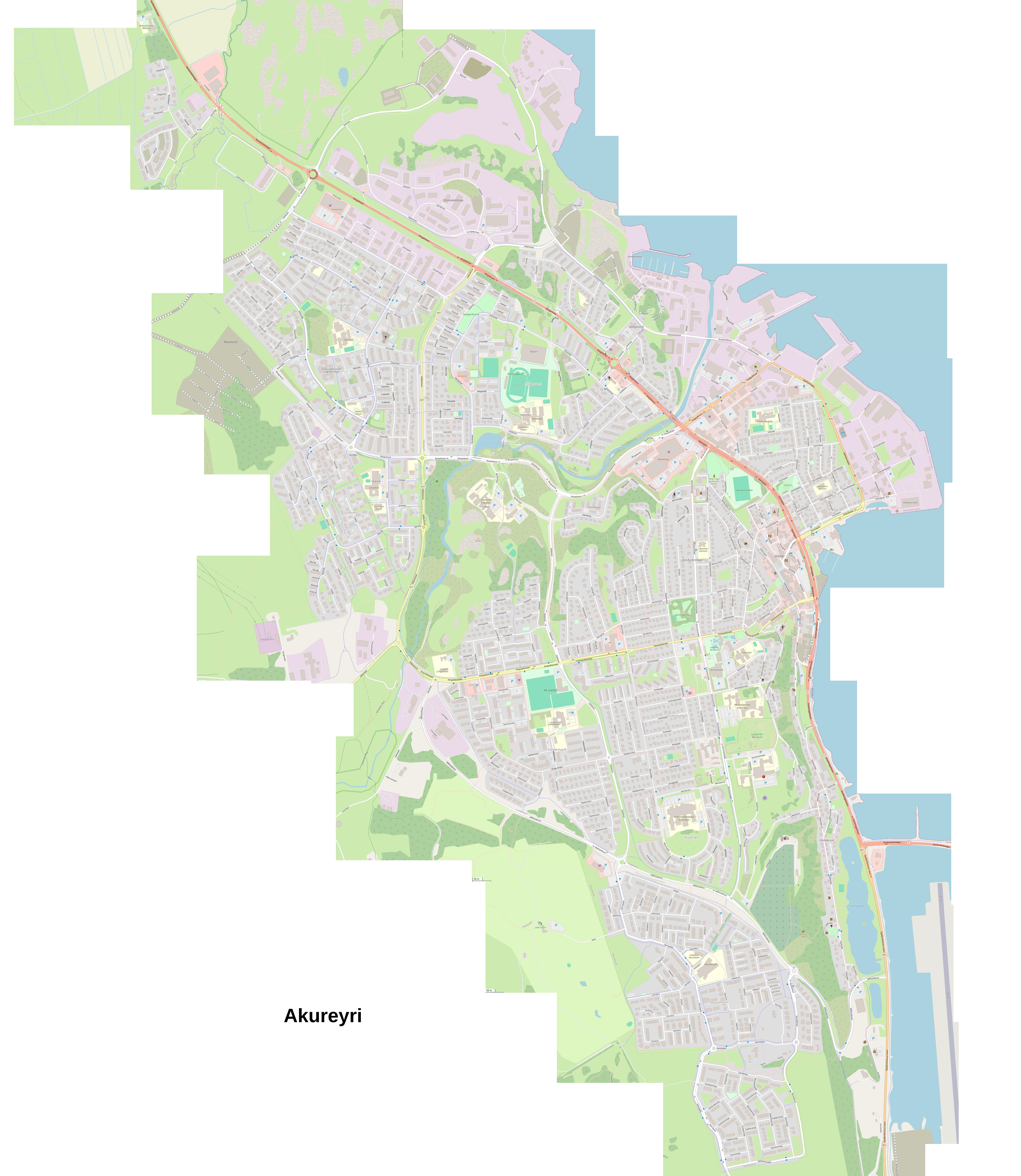
Map of Akureyri

Akureyri is located at 65°41′N 18°06′W and positioned on the west side of the inland end of the fjord Eyjafjörður. It is surrounded by mountains, the highest being Strýta [ˈstriːta] (1,451 m (4,760 ft)); 10 kilometres (6.2 miles) to the west) and Kerling [ˈcʰɛ(r)tliŋk] (1,538 m (5,046 ft)) at the head of Glerádalur [ˈklɛːrˌauːˌtaːlʏr̥], 15 km (9.3 mi) to the southwest. It has a narrow coastal strip of flat land; inland is a steep but low hill. In earlier times, a few spits of land (Icelandic: eyri, thus Akur-eyri) jutted from the narrow coast, but much land has since been reclaimed from the sea, so that today the coastline is more even except for the largest spit, Oddeyri [ˈɔtːˌeiːrɪ], which was formed by the river Glerá, which runs through the town. The name of the town is possibly derived from the name of a field that may have been situated near some of the sheltered locations by the river.

The body of sea between Oddeyri and the end of the fjord is known as Pollurinn [ˈpʰɔtlʏrɪn] ("The Pool") and is known for calm winds and a good natural harbour. Akureyri today is centered on Ráðhústorg [ˈrauðˌhusˌtʰɔrk] (Town Hall Square) near the northwest corner of Pollurinn. The districts of Akureyri are: Innbær [ˈɪnːˌpaiːr̥], the oldest part of town on the strip of land between the hill and Pollurinn south of the central area; Brekkan [ˈprɛhkan], on top of the hill; Oddeyri on the peninsula of the same name; and Glerárhverfi [ˈklɛːrˌaurˌkʰvɛrvɪ] on the north bank of the Glerá (also referred to colloquially as Þorpið [ˈθɔr̥pɪθ], 'the Village'). Because of the town's position at the head of a long fjord surrounded by high mountains, the climate is more typically inland than coastal, with greater variations in temperature (warmer summers, colder winters) than in many other inhabited parts of Iceland. However, the mountains shield the town from strong winds. The relatively warm climate (for its latitude) allows the botanical gardens to flourish without need of a greenhouse. The area around Akureyri has one of the warmest climates in Iceland, even though it is only 100 km (62 mi) from the Arctic Circle.

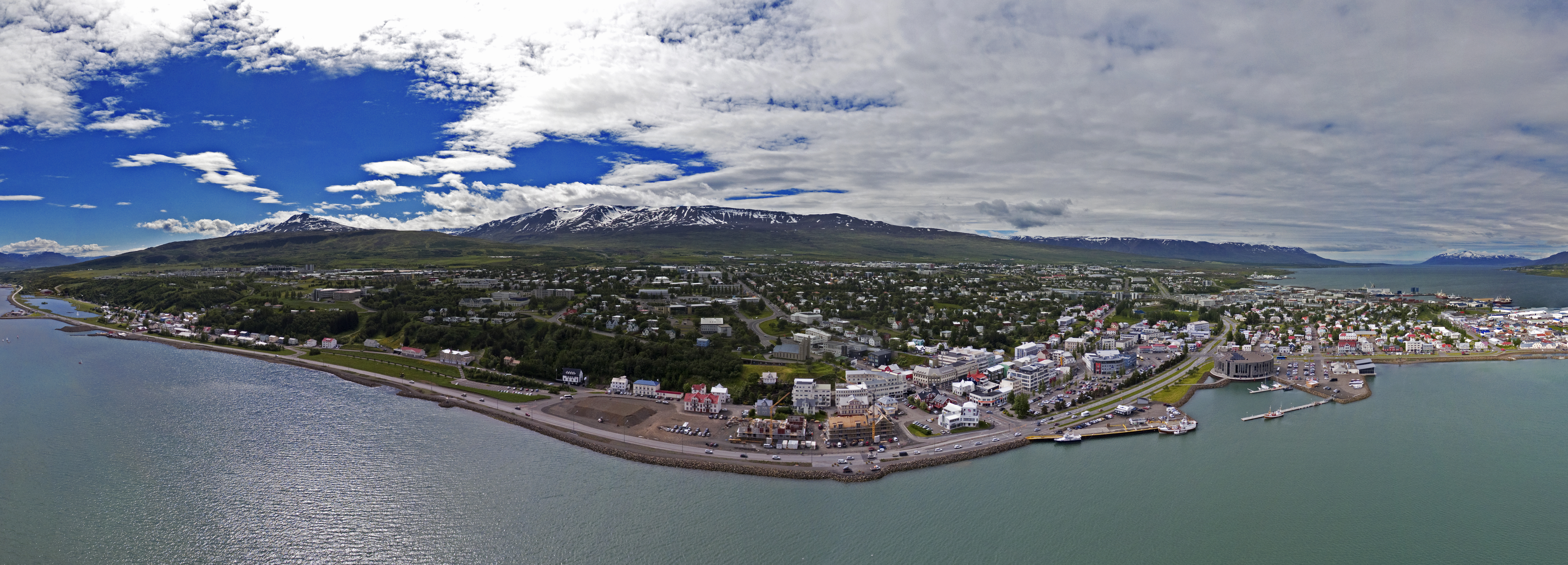
Aerial panorama of Akureyri

== Climate ==
Akureyri has a very rare Mediterranean-influenced subarctic climate (Köppen: Dsc), with cold (though not severe) snowy winters and cool, cloudy, dry summers. The snow cover starts forming in late October and melts in April, yet snow can lie on the mountain peaks around Akureyri for the whole year.

Akureyri is a very cloudy town, averaging only 1,051 sunshine hours annually, with barely any sunshine between November and February (which is also due to the town's location less than 100 km from the Arctic Circle), but precipitation is much lower than in southern Iceland because the town is leeward of the prevailing southerly winds – it is as little as a fifth as much as in Vík í Mýrdal.

Climate data for Akureyri, 1991–2020 normals, extremes 1949–present
| Month | Jan | Feb | Mar | Apr | May | Jun | Jul | Aug | Sep | Oct | Nov | Dec | Year |
|---|---|---|---|---|---|---|---|---|---|---|---|---|---|
| Record high °C (°F) | 17.5 (63.5) | 14.5 (58.1) | 15.2 (59.4) | 21.5 (70.7) | 24.6 (76.3) | 29.4 (84.9) | 27.6 (81.7) | 27.7 (81.9) | 23.6 (74.5) | 19.5 (67.1) | 20.4 (68.7) | 15.1 (59.2) | 29.4 (84.9) |
| Mean daily maximum °C (°F) | 2.7 (36.9) | 2.6 (36.7) | 3.5 (38.3) | 6.6 (43.9) | 10.3 (50.5) | 13.7 (56.7) | 15.1 (59.2) | 14.8 (58.6) | 11.8 (53.2) | 6.6 (43.9) | 3.6 (38.5) | 2.6 (36.7) | 7.8 (46.0) |
| Daily mean °C (°F) | −0.5 (31.1) | −0.8 (30.6) | -0.0 (32.0) | 2.6 (36.7) | 6.2 (43.2) | 9.6 (49.3) | 11.2 (52.2) | 10.8 (51.4) | 8.0 (46.4) | 3.5 (38.3) | 0.6 (33.1) | −0.7 (30.7) | 4.2 (39.6) |
| Mean daily minimum °C (°F) | −3.5 (25.7) | −3.6 (25.5) | −2.6 (27.3) | −0.3 (31.5) | 3.2 (37.8) | 6.6 (43.9) | 8.5 (47.3) | 7.9 (46.2) | 5.4 (41.7) | 1.1 (34.0) | −2.1 (28.2) | −3.6 (25.5) | 1.4 (34.5) |
| Record low °C (°F) | −21.6 (−6.9) | −21.2 (−6.2) | −23.0 (−9.4) | −18.2 (−0.8) | −10.4 (13.3) | −2.1 (28.2) | 1.3 (34.3) | −2.2 (28.0) | −8.4 (16.9) | −13.6 (7.5) | −18.5 (−1.3) | −20.6 (−5.1) | −23.0 (−9.4) |
| Average precipitation mm (inches) | 60.2 (2.37) | 52.2 (2.06) | 47.4 (1.87) | 25.9 (1.02) | 24.1 (0.95) | 20.7 (0.81) | 33.7 (1.33) | 41.4 (1.63) | 53.2 (2.09) | 74.0 (2.91) | 68.3 (2.69) | 72.8 (2.87) | 573.9 (22.59) |
| Average precipitation days (≥ 1.0 mm) | 11.1 | 10.2 | 9.9 | 6.7 | 5.9 | 4.9 | 7.7 | 8.1 | 9.4 | 11.7 | 10.9 | 12.0 | 108.5 |
| Average snowy days (≥ 0 cm) | 22.0 | 16.9 | 16.1 | 5.7 | 0.3 | 0.0 | 0.0 | 0.0 | 0.1 | 3.9 | 12.4 | 18.1 | 95.5 |
| Average relative humidity (%) | 79.4 | 79.3 | 78.9 | 75.7 | 73.4 | 73.2 | 77.8 | 78.3 | 77.4 | 81.2 | 80.8 | 79.5 | 77.9 |
| Average dew point °C (°F) | −3.8 (25.2) | −4.2 (24.4) | −3.7 (25.3) | −1.9 (28.6) | 1.1 (34.0) | 4.7 (40.5) | 7.2 (45.0) | 6.9 (44.4) | 4.0 (39.2) | 0.2 (32.4) | −2.5 (27.5) | −3.9 (25.0) | 0.3 (32.6) |
| Mean monthly sunshine hours | 6.5 | 33.9 | 77.9 | 127.5 | 171.0 | 189.9 | 152.5 | 138.0 | 90.4 | 47.9 | 15.2 | 0.3 | 1,051 |
Source 1: Icelandic Met Office (humidity 1981–2010)
Source 2: NOAA

Coastal temperature data for Akureyri
| Month | Jan | Feb | Mar | Apr | May | Jun | Jul | Aug | Sep | Oct | Nov | Dec | Year |
|---|---|---|---|---|---|---|---|---|---|---|---|---|---|
| Average sea temperature °C (°F) | 2.5 (36.50) | 2.2 (35.96) | 2.1 (35.78) | 2.6 (36.68) | 4.0 (39.20) | 6.4 (43.52) | 8.5 (47.30) | 9.5 (49.10) | 8.2 (46.76) | 6.0 (42.80) | 5.1 (41.18) | 3.9 (39.02) | 5.1 (41.15) |
Source 1: Seatemperature.net

== Demographics ==
As of 2026, Akureyri has a population of 20,284. As of 2015, about 3% of the population are foreign citizens, from 53 countries. In 2014, there were 229 births and 118 deaths in Akureyri. Immigration in 2014 was 1,097 individuals, while emigration was 1,122 residents. Population growth in 2014 was therefore 0.5%. The population in 1910 was 2,239, increasing to 7,711 in 1950 and 16,756 in 2005.

== Crime ==
Crime statistics have been published by the Iceland national police for 2000. Akureyri had a reported 726 nontraffic offences per 10,000 population compared with a national average of 892, while 2,891 traffic offences per 10,000 population were recorded compared with a national average of 2,397. Akureyri has five police officers on call. Incidents have occurred where insufficient police officers were on duty to respond to criminal activity in progress, as confirmed by the mayor. However, Akureyri, and Iceland in general, has one of the lowest crime rates in the world.

== Economy ==
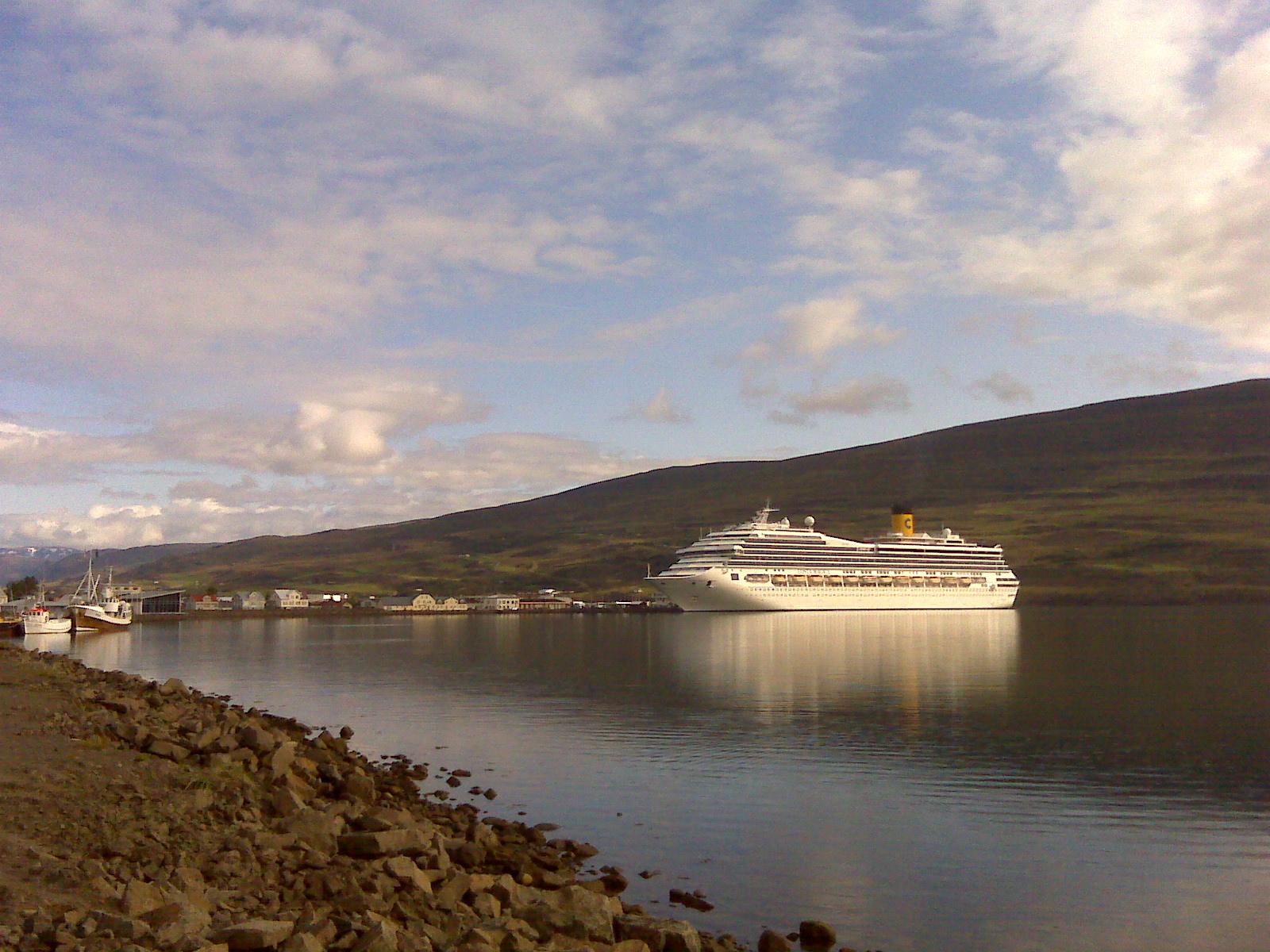
Cruise ship in the harbour

The fishing industry has historically been a large and important part of the local economy. In recent years, other industries and business services have also begun. Higher education is also a growing sector in the local economy. About 20% of the work force is in the service industry.

Two of the five largest fishing companies in Iceland are headquartered in Akureyri, partly because of the ice-free port. Other large companies in Akureyri include Samherji, Norðurmjólk, Brim hf, and Vífilfell, the largest brewery in Iceland. Akureyri Hospital (Icelandic: Sjúkrahúsið á Akureyri) is a major employer in the area and is one of two major hospitals in Iceland.

Corporations pay a tax rate of 18% to the national government, which is one of the lowest in the world. No additional local corporate taxes are levied. Property tax, at 1.99%, accounts for most of the tax base. A local government deficit of ISK 1 billion (US$9 million) was anticipated in 2009, prompting a cut in salaries of the mayor, town councilors, and committee members by 10% and increases in local taxes and property taxes.

== Culture ==
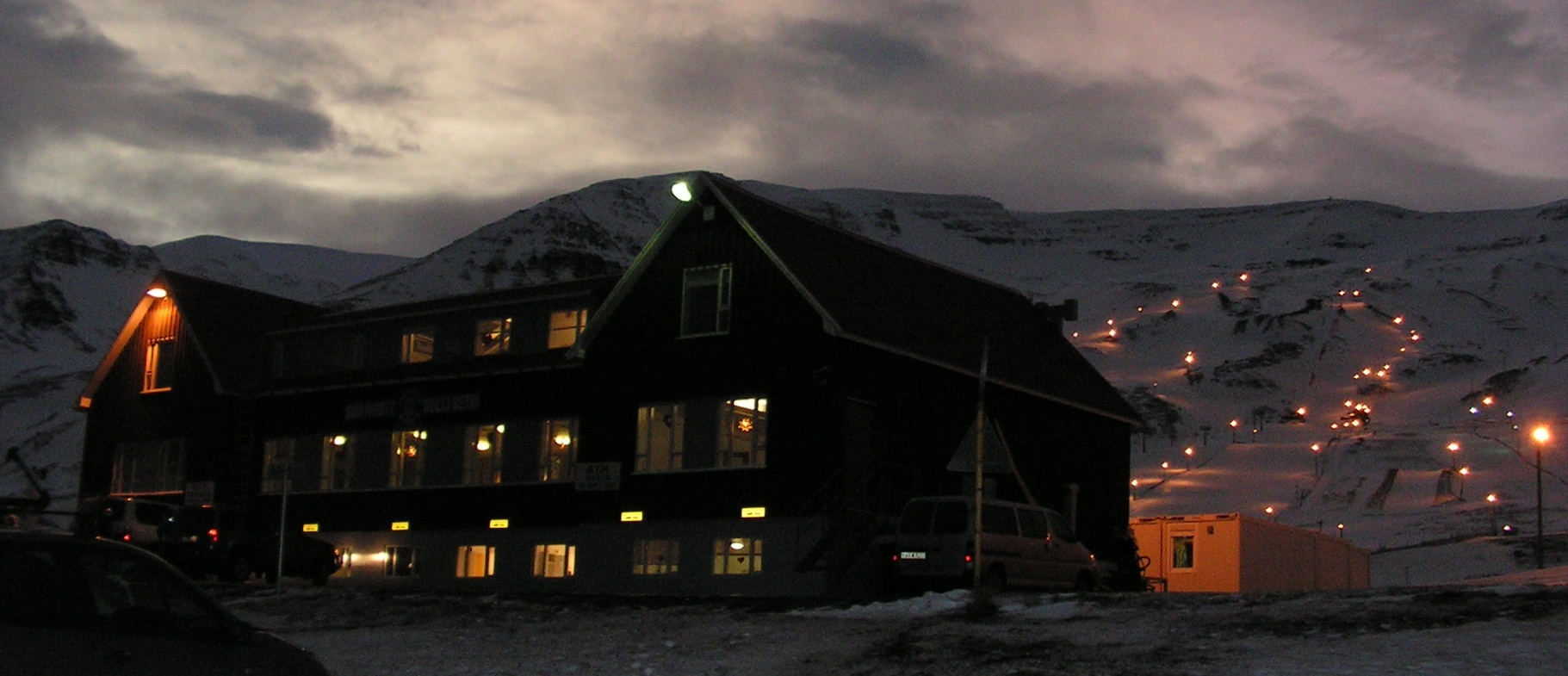
Hlíðarfjall ski slopes just west of the town

Akureyri has a robust cultural scene, with several bars and reputable restaurants. The Icelandic folk dance ensemble "Vefarinn" comes from Akureyri. Folk culture, in general, is more prevalent in Akureyri than in Reykjavík. During the summer, several festivals are held in Akureyri and the surrounding area. One example is the medieval festival held every summer at Gásir. The Akureyri International Music Festival, a concert series by bands, was held for the fourth time in 2009. The town has one of the largest libraries in the country.

=== Media ===
The Vikudagur newspaper is published in Akureyri. The Icelandic National Broadcasting Service (Ríkisútvarpið) operates two radio channels nationwide. The several radio stations in Akureyri include FM Akureyri and Voice FM 98.7. Several television stations can be watched in Akureyri. N4 is a station whose studios are located in Akureyri. Initially a local channel, it began to broadcast nationwide in 2008.

== Townscape ==
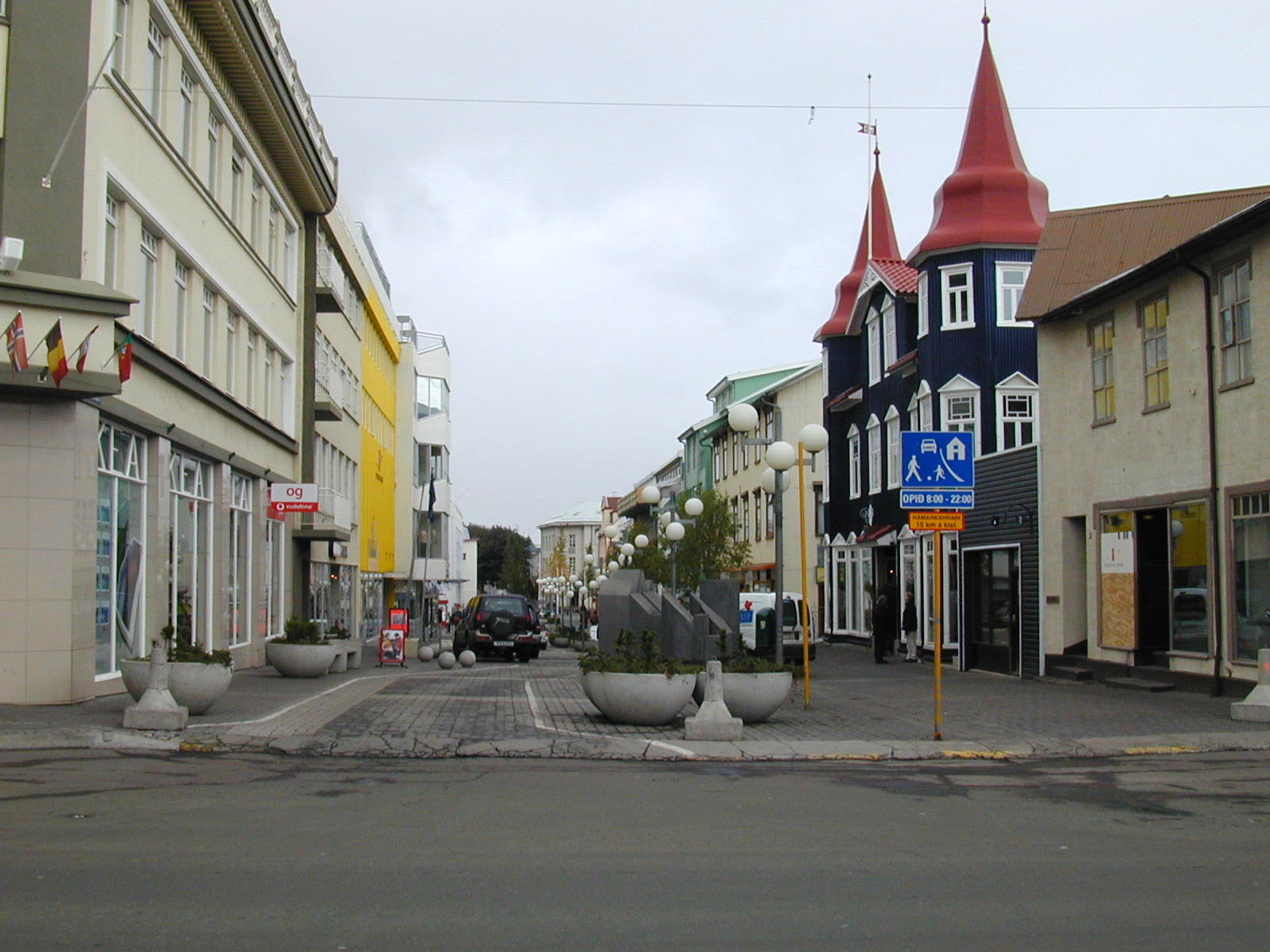
The town centre of Akureyri

Sites that have been cited as areas of interest include various museums, churches, and the Botanical Gardens. Local museums include the Minjasafnið á Akureyri (Akureyri Museum), Listasafnið á Akureyri (Akureyri Art Museum), Nonnahús (Nonni house or Jón Sveinsson Memorial Museum, for the writer), Davíðshús (David's house or Davíð Stefánsson Memorial Museum, for the poet), Akureyri Museum of Industry, a motorcycle museum, and Flugsafn Íslands (Aviation Museum of Iceland). The most northerly 18 hole golf course in the world is in the town. The Náttúrufræðistofnun Norðurlands (Nature Museum) was opened in 1957 and is in the grounds of the Akureyri Botanical Garden. The Botanical Gardens (Lystigarður Akureyrar) are located in Spítalavegur. Large churches include the Akureyrarkirkja (The church of Akureyri) and Glerárkirkja (The church of Glerá). Sundlaug Akureyrar is a swimming pool in Akureyri.

New residential and commercial growth has required an extension of electricity and water distribution, as well as new water drilling. Much of the town is heated geothermally.

== Administration ==
=== Law and government ===
Akureyri is governed by a town council, directly elected by those over 18 with registered domicile in the town. The council has 11 members, who are elected for four-year terms. The mayor is appointed by the council: usually one of the council members is chosen, but they may also appoint a mayor who is not a member of the council.

The last elections to the town council were held on 31 May 2014. The People's List (Listi fólksins), which won an outright majority in 2010, and The Town List (Bæjarlistinn) merged into L-list, the Town List of Akureyri. They had seven representatives together, but now have only two, 18.8%. The Independence Party (Sjálfstæðisflokkurinn) received the most votes, three seats in the council, 25.8%, instead of only one previously. Social Democratic Alliance (Samfylkingin) and Progressive Party (Framsóknarflokkurinn) each got two seats instead of the previous one each. Left-Green Movement (Vinstri hreyfingin grænt framboð) and Bright Future (Björt framtíð) each got one seat. L-list, Social Democratic Alliance, and the Progressive Party formed a new majority in the council. The new majority decided that Eiríkur Björn Björgvinsson, mayor of Akureyri since 2010, would continue to serve as mayor.

=== Timeline of mayors ===
- 1919–1934 – Jón Sveinsson
- 1934–1958 – Steinn Steinsen
- 1958–1967 – Magnús Guðjónsson
- 1967–1976 – Bjarni Einarsson
- 1976–1986 – Helgi M. Bergs
- 1986–1990 – Sigfús Jónsson
- 1990–1994 – Halldór Jónsson
- 1994–1998 – Jakob Björnsson
- 1998–2007 – Kristján Þór Júlíusson
- 2007–2009 – Sigrún Björk Jakobsdóttir
- 2009–2010 – Hermann Jón Tómasson
- 2010–2018 – Eiríkur Björn Björgvinsson
- 2018–present – Ásthildur Sturludóttir

== Twin towns – sister cities ==
Akureyri is twinned with:

- Ålesund, Norway
- Denver, United States
- Gimli, Canada
- Hafnarfjörður, Iceland
- Lahti, Finland
- Murmansk, Russia
- Narsaq, Greenland
- Randers, Denmark
- Vágur, Faroe Islands
- Västerås, Sweden

In 2007, a friendship and fisheries agreement was signed with Grimsby, United Kingdom, which according to Ice News, might lead to a twin cities designation in the future.

== Education ==
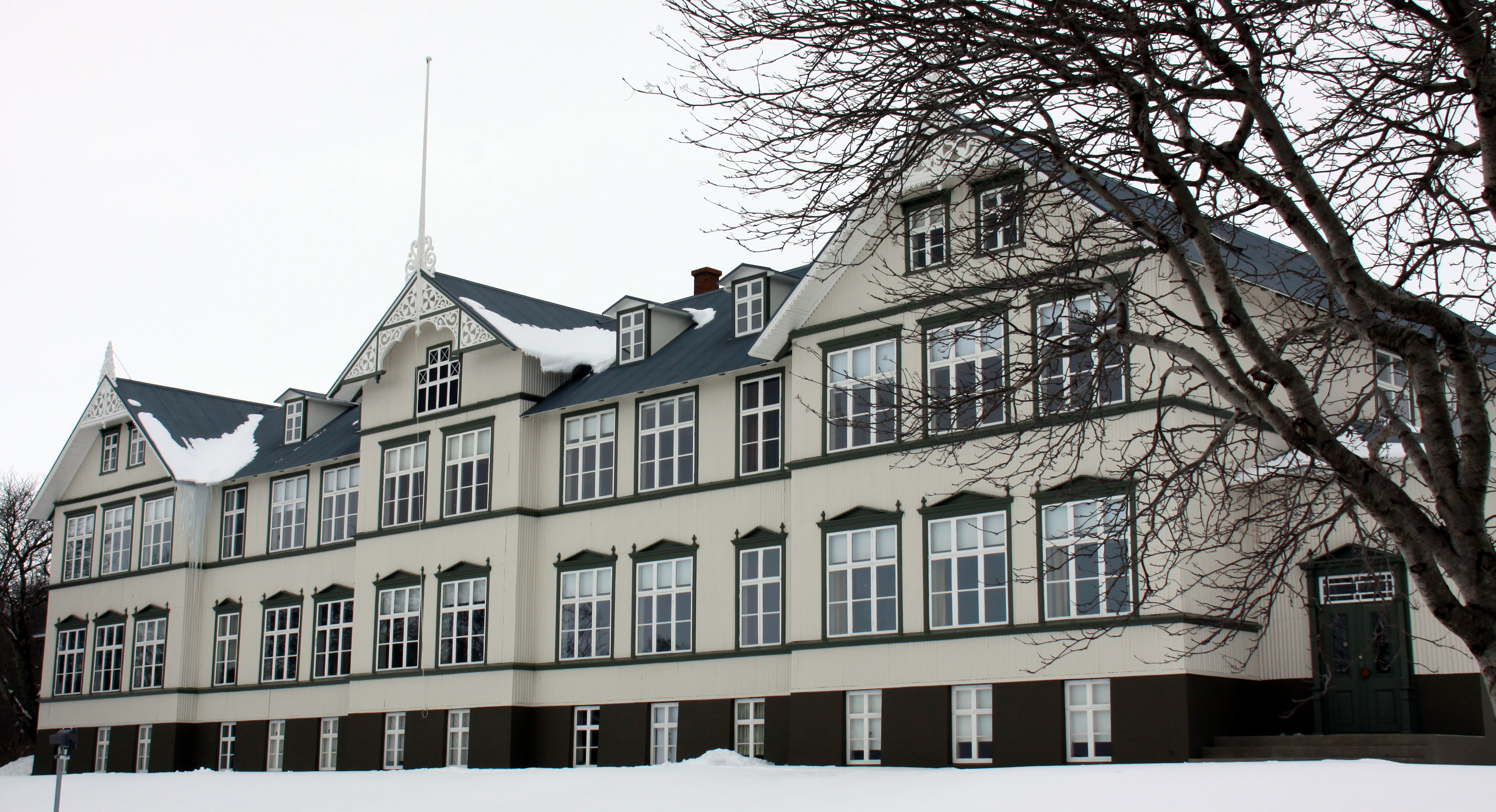
The old building (Gamli Skóli) of Akureyri Junior College

There are two high schools (junior colleges) in Akureyri, one of them being the second oldest in Iceland. Menntaskólinn á Akureyri (MA) is the older of the two schools, offering purely academic studies, while the newer Verkmenntaskólinn á Akureyri (VMA), offers both academic and vocational studies.

The University of Akureyri (Háskólinn á Akureyri) was founded in 1987. There are 3 faculties or colleges, the Faculty of Business and Science, Faculty of Humanities and Social Sciences and Faculty of Health Sciences. The university offers master's degrees in several subjects.

== Transport ==
=== Airport ===
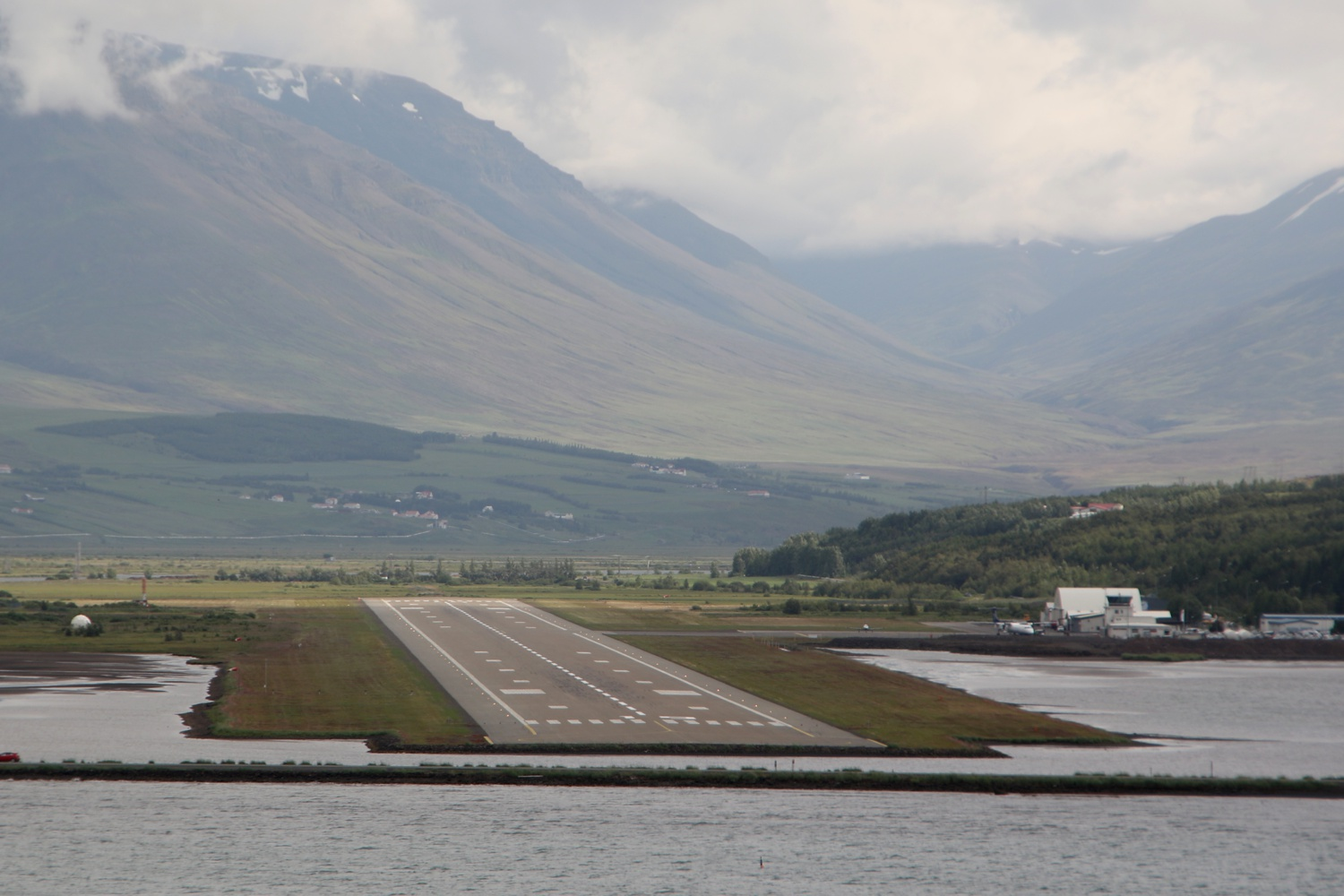
Runway of Akureyri Airport

Akureyri Airport is, other than the main hub at Reykjavík–Keflavík, the only airport in Iceland with scheduled international commercial service.

The majority of traffic at Akureyri airport is domestic. Icelandair flies several times a day to Reykjavík. Additionally, Norlandair operates flights to Grímsey, Vopnafjörður and Þórshöfn (small settlements in northeast Iceland), as well as limited service to Nerlerit Inaat (Constable Point) in Greenland.

EasyJet, Edelweiss and Transavia serve seasonal international flights to Amsterdam, London-Gatwick, Manchester and Zürich.

=== Marine port ===
The port of Akureyri is vital to the town, as fisheries are an important part of its economy. It is the site of large fish processing plants and has docking facilities for trawlers. It is also important for freight handling and for tourism, as cruise ships stop in Akureyri during the summer months. The ice-free nature of the port has been important in the town's establishment.

=== Bus ===
Local bus services within Akureyri are free and provided by SVA. The cessation of fares in 2008 resulted in an increase of 130% in passenger numbers compared to the previous year when fares were charged.

Long-distance bus routes are managed by Strætó bs. in cooperation with the Icelandic Road Administration. Most long distance buses pass through Akureyri Airport and stop at the Hof Cultural Centre.

=== Roads ===
Route 1 or the Ring Road (Þjóðvegur 1 or Hringvegur) connects the town with the other parts of the country, including Reykjavík, which is 390 kilometres (242 miles) away. The road is mostly one lane in each direction, but is paved and open year-round. The Vaðlaheiðargöng tunnel is directly east of the town on Route 1. It opened for traffic in December 2018, reducing the road distance from Akureyri to Mývatn lake by 16 kilometres (9.9 mi). It is currently Iceland's only toll road.

Parking in the city centre is subject to fees as of 2023, split into two zones. The F821 mountain road climbs southwards from Akureyri and connects with the F26 mountain road across the highlands towards the south of the country. It is only open during summer.

== Utilities ==
Akureyri has been heated geothermally since the late 1970s, using a district heating system. Beginning in 1928, there were attempts to develop geothermal energy. During this period, electricity and oil were used for heating. Construction of a geothermal distribution system was begun in 1976 after the discovery of a commercially viable source in 1975. Distribution was widespread by 1979.

The Laugaland field near Akureyri was the first geothermal source commercially developed. The Ytri-Tjarnir field followed. To obtain sufficient water flow, additional fields were developed at Botn in 1980, Glerárdalur 2 kilometres (1 mi) SW of the town in 1981, and Þelamörk 10 kilometres (6 mi) north of the town in 1992. Water temperature is generally 65 to 75 °C (149 to 167 °F) but can drop to 45 °C (113 °F) during hot summer days. The cost of geothermal production is, at 32 mill/kwh, higher than the Icelandic national average of 11, but slightly less than the cost of imported heating oil. There is diminishing excess capacity but there are known and untapped resources near the town. Furthermore, there have been proposals to reinject water to extend the life of the sources.

== Sports ==
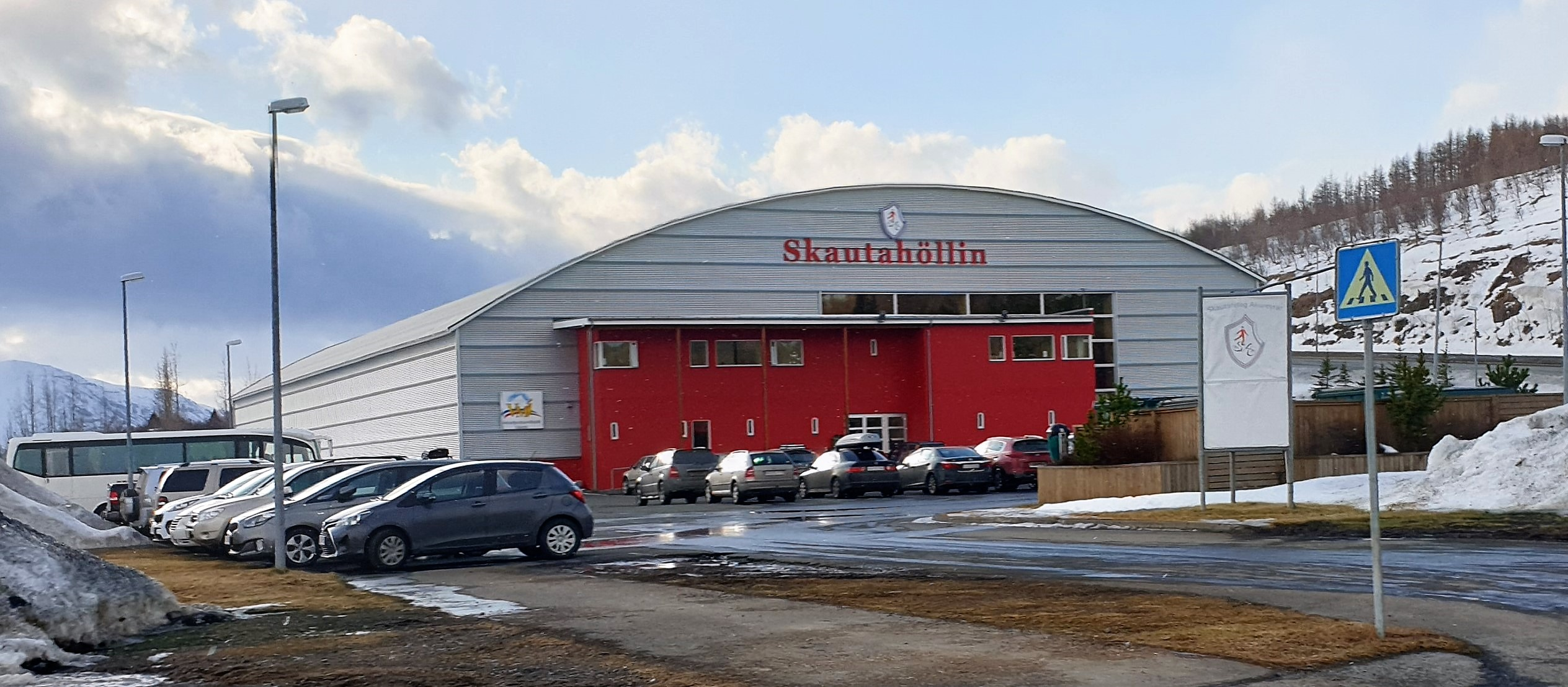
Skautahöllin ice hall in Akureyri

Knattspyrnufélag Akureyrar (KA) and Þór Akureyri are the two biggest multi-sport clubs in the town. They field teams in several sports, such as basketball, football and handball.

The most successful football team of late in the town has been Þór/KA, a joint women's team from KA and Þór. Since 2008, it has finished in the top four in the top-tier Úrvalsdeild kvenna, winning the national championship in 2012 and 2017. The clubs also have two men's football teams under their own names. The clubs field a joint team in women's handball, KA/Þór. They fielded a joint men's team under the name Akureyri Handboltafélag from 2016 to 2017 before KA broke off from the cooperation and fielded a separate team in 2017–2018.

In basketball, Þór fields both men's and women's team. Its women's team has won the national championship three times: in 1969, 1971 and 1976.

The town's ice hockey team, Skautafélag Akureyrar, is the most successful team in the history of the Icelandic Hockey League, with 20 championships from 1992 to 2018.

The Akureyri Golf Club is the second oldest golf club in Iceland behind the Reykjavík Golf Club. It was established in 1935 and is the annual location of The Arctic Open held each summer solstice. The town is also the birthplace of Icelandic footballers Birkir Bjarnason and Aron Gunnarsson, as well as mixed martial arts fighter Gunnar Nelson.

Winner of the 2011 Icelandic Chess Championship Elsa María Kristínardóttir was also born in Akureyri.

== See also ==
- Sandgerðisbót

== Sources ==
- AFE (2004). "Fresh Location" (PDF). AFE Investment Promotion Agency. Archived from the original (PDF) on 14 February 2012..
- Evans, Andrew (2008). Iceland. Bradt Travel Guides. ISBN 978-1-84162-215-6..
- Parnell, Fran; O'Carroll, Etain (2007). Iceland. Lonely Planet Publications. ISBN 978-1-74104-537-6..
- "Akureyri Municipal Website". akureyri.is. (In Icelandic and English.)
- "Travel Guide for Akureyri". Akureyri Cultural and Marketing Office. (In Icelandic and English.)
- "Port of Akureyri". port.is. (In English.)
- "RES – The School for Renewable Energy Science". res.is. Archived from the original on 21 January 2016. (In English.)
