= Akureyri Golf Club =

Icelandic golf course

Coordinates: 65°39′57″N 18°6′57″W

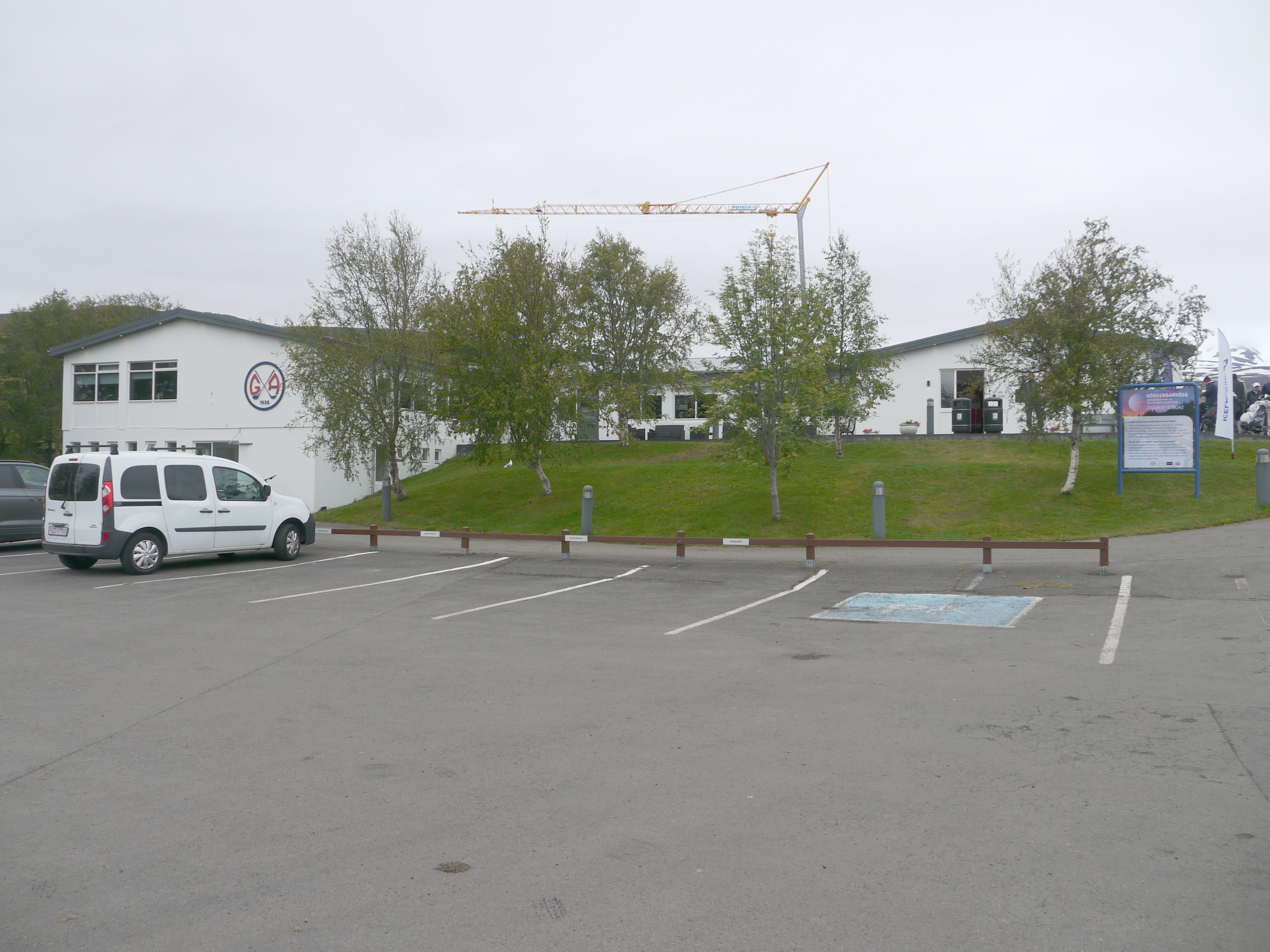
Akureyri Golf Club

Akureyri Golf Club is a golf course located in Akureyri, Iceland, at Jaðarsvöllur, it was named "the most northerly 18-hole golf course" according to The Royal and Ancient Golf Club of St Andrews. It features a moorland course, broad ridges, tree clusters, and rock outcroppings. Due to its proximity to the Arctic Circle, it is possible to play golf at Akureyri Golf Club at night under the midnight sun during the summer.

Akureyri Golf Club was established in 1935. It is Iceland's second-oldest golf club after Reykjavik Golf Club.

Akureyri Golf Club established its current location at the Jadar farm in 1970. For ten years, the members played a 9-hole course which is now the front nine, designed by Magnus Gudmundsson. In 1980, the second nine holes were added. The second nine holes were developed and implemented by Magnus Gudmundsson and Gunnar Thordarson.

The Arctic Open is held at Akureyri Golf Club during the summer solstice. It was first held in 1986. It is a four-day championship event, open to international professional and amateur golfers.

In 1997, four men completed the longest daytime round of golf in history by playing 306 holes at Akureyri Golf Club during the summer when it stays light through the night.
