= Gásir =

Medieval trading and training post, and heritage site in Iceland

Coordinates: 65.7828°N 18.1664°W

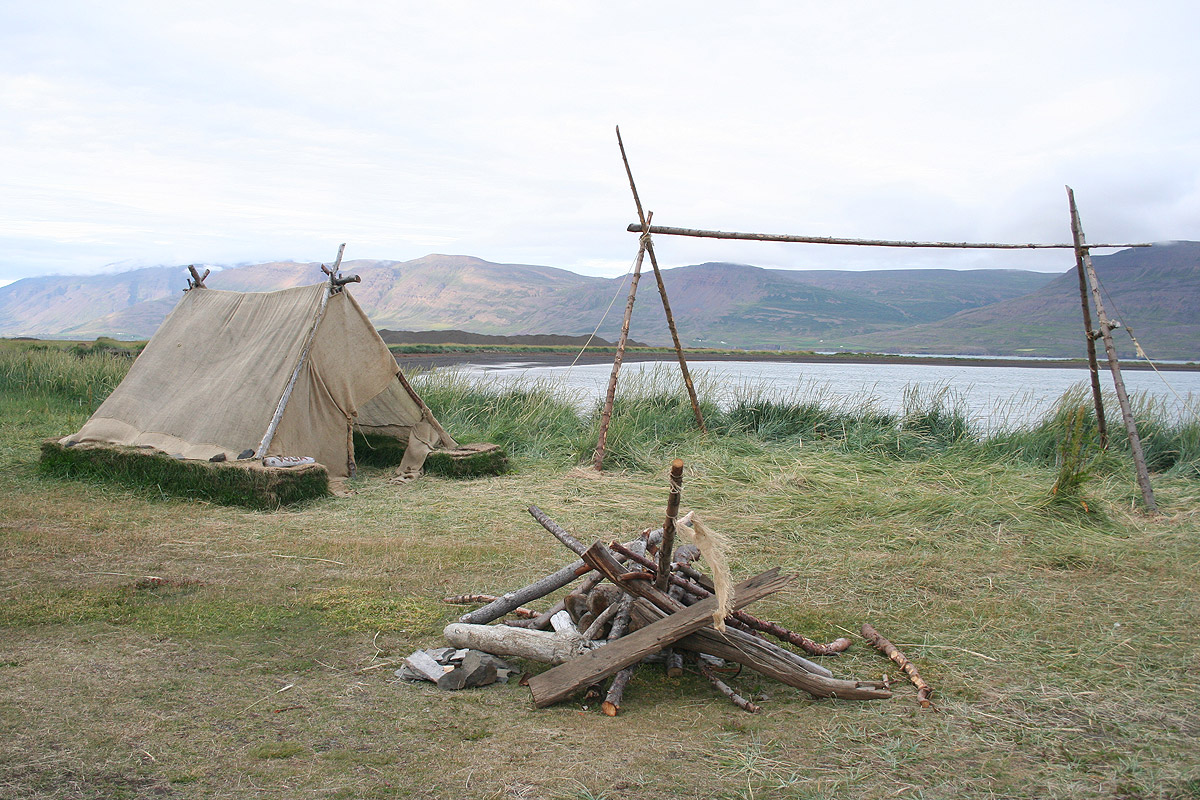
Campground at Gásir, Iceland

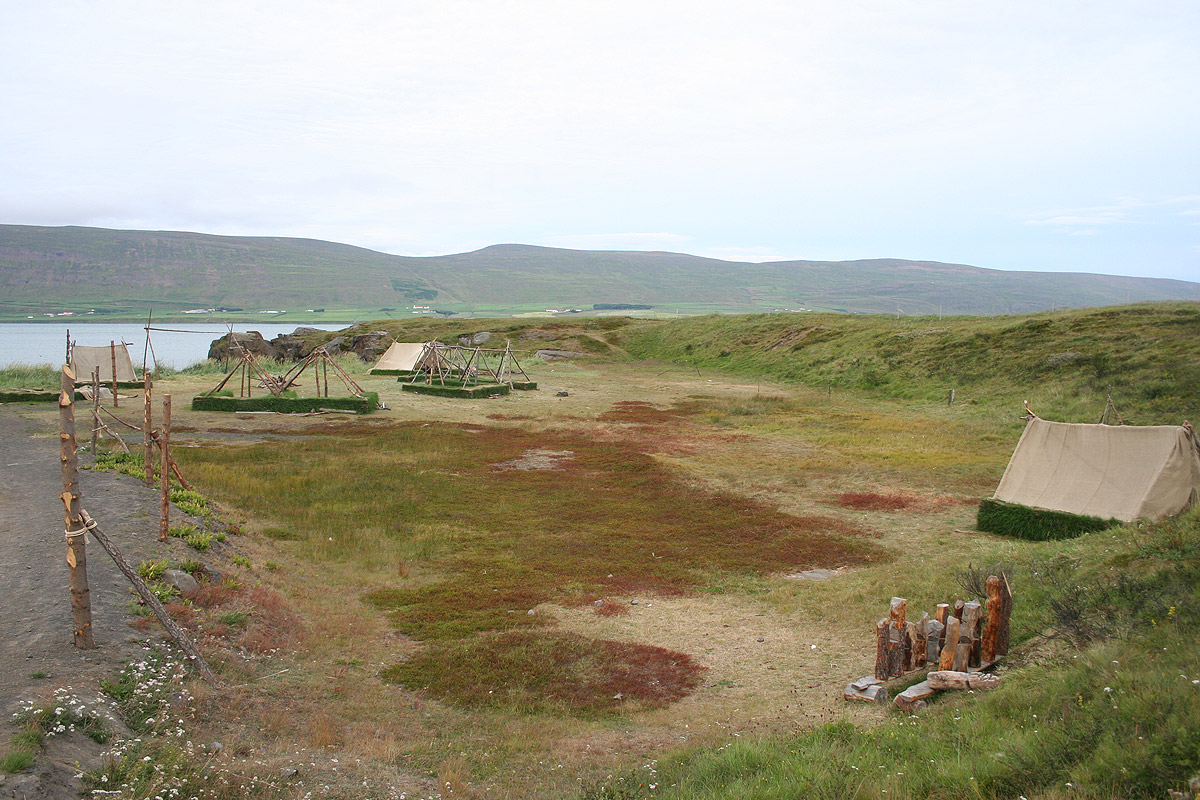
General view of Gásir, Iceland

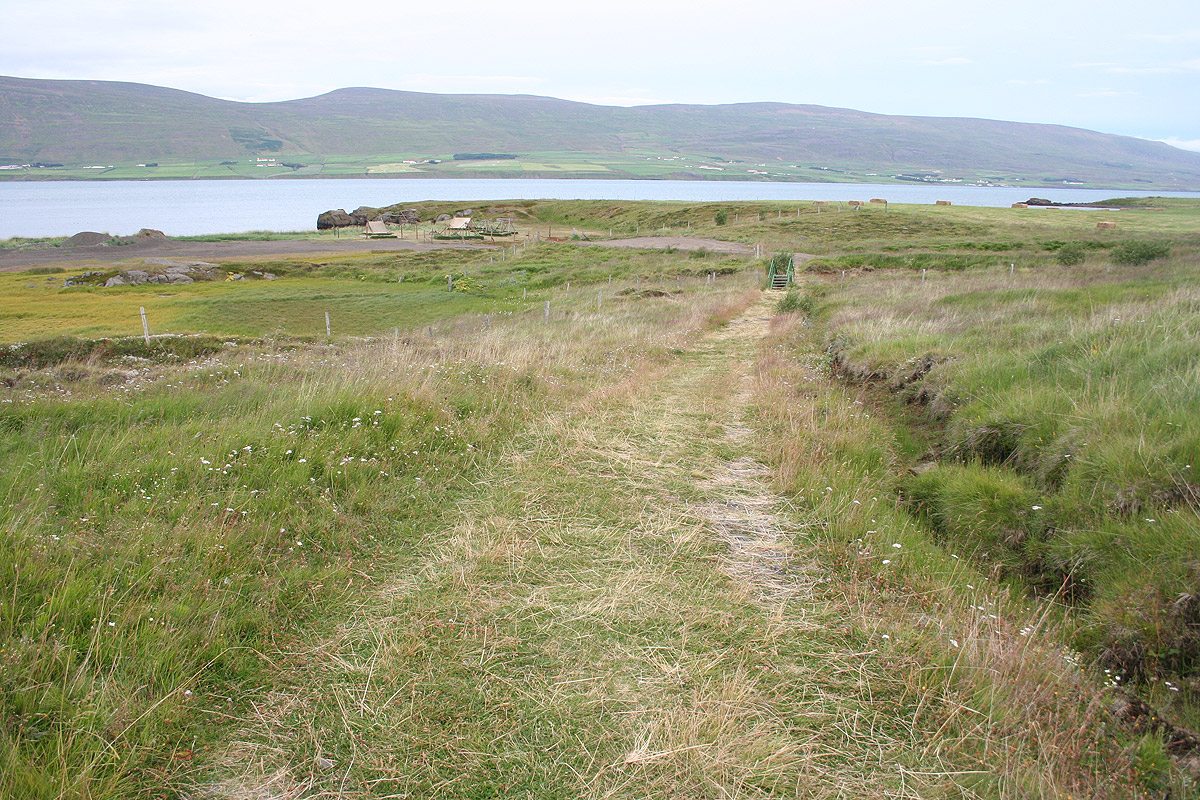
Road to Gásir, Iceland

Gásir (Icelandic pronunciation: [ˈkauːsɪr̥]) or Gásakaupstaður [ˈkauːsaˌkʰœypˌstaːðʏr̥] was a medieval trading post situated 11 kilometres (6.8 mi) north of Akureyri on the coast of Eyjafjörður, in Northern Iceland. Gásir is recognized as an Icelandic heritage site, and the Akureyri Museum hosts events at its location, in addition to providing online information about the former training post.

== Overview ==
Gásir was the main trading post in Northern Iceland during the Middle Ages, and is mentioned many times in Old Icelandic Sagas from the 13th and 14th centuries. Archaeological digs in the area have shown that it was a trading post until the 16th century, after which it may have been superseded by Akureyri as trade moved further south.

The Akureyri Museum holds a festival called Medieval Days at Gásir every July, dedicated to learning experiences focusing on the culture of late Medieval Iceland. Due to the COVID-19 pandemic, the festival was cancelled between 2020 and 2021.
