= Reykjavik Golf Club =

Icelandic golf course

Coordinates: 64.1523°N 21.7587°W

The Reykjavik Golf Club is a golf club located 10 kilometres (6.2 mi) east of Reykjavík, Iceland. The club was established in 1934 and is the oldest and largest golf club in Iceland. It has hosted many European and Scandinavian tournaments including major events such as the European Youth and European Seniors Tour Championships. It was originally named Golf Club Iceland since it was the only golf club in Iceland at the time. However, as other clubs opened such as Akureyri Golf Club in 1935 and Westman Islands Golf Club in 1938, the name was changed to Reykjavik Golf Club.

The club consists of two 18-hole courses - one at Grafarholt and the other at Korpfulsstadir on the southern outskirts of Reykjavik.

== Grafarholt course ==
The Grafarholt 18-hole course opened in 1963 and is the oldest 18-hole course in Iceland. The Grafarholt course was designed by Swedish golf architect Nils Sköld. The course has a par of 71 and measures 6,590 yards (6,030 m) from the back tees.

== Korpúlfsstaðir course ==
The Korpúlfsstaðir golf course was opened in 1997. It was designed by Hannes Thorsteinsson. The course is a 6,600 yards (6,000 m) par 72 from the back tees. The front nine curves around the Korpa River, while the back nine heads towards the sea and the Faxa Bay.

== Tournaments ==
The Amstel Light Iceland Open is held jointly at Reykjavik Golf Club as well as at Keilir Golf Club during the summer solstice at the end of June each year since 2002. The tee times start at midnight.
