= Akureyri Botanical Garden =

Botanical garden in Akureyri, Iceland

Coordinates: 65°40′30″N 18°05′36″W

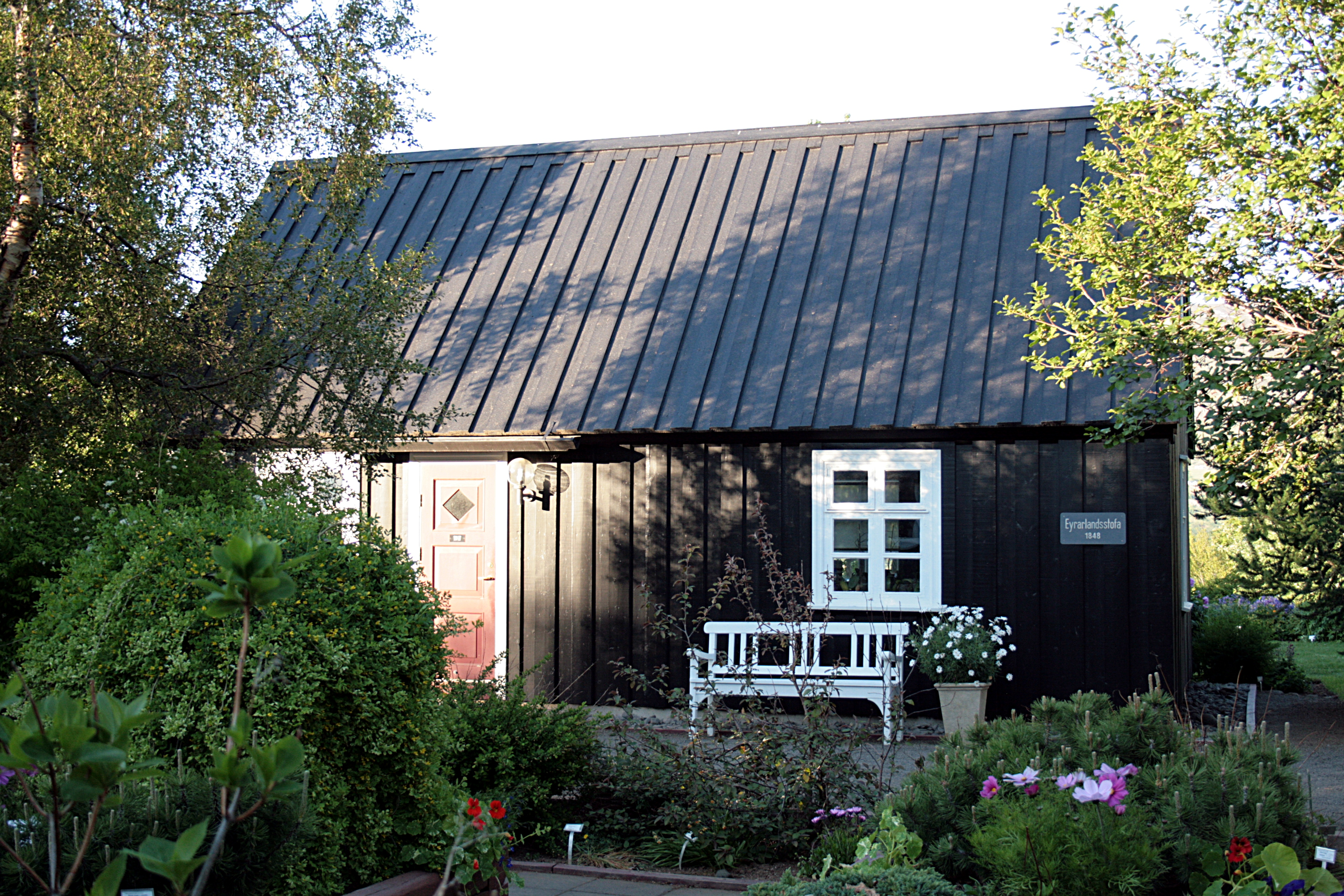
North Side of the Eyrarlandsstofa

The Akureyri Botanical Garden (Icelandic: Lystigarður Akureyrar [ˈlɪstiˌkarðʏr ˈaːkʏrˌeiːrar̥], regionally also [-ˈaːkʰʏr-]) is a unique and significant botanical garden located in the southern part of Akureyri, a city in Northern Iceland. Situated on the west side of the inland end of the fjord Eyjafjörður, at an elevation of about 45 metres, the garden is one of the northernmost botanical gardens in the world, just 85 kilometers south of the Arctic Circle.

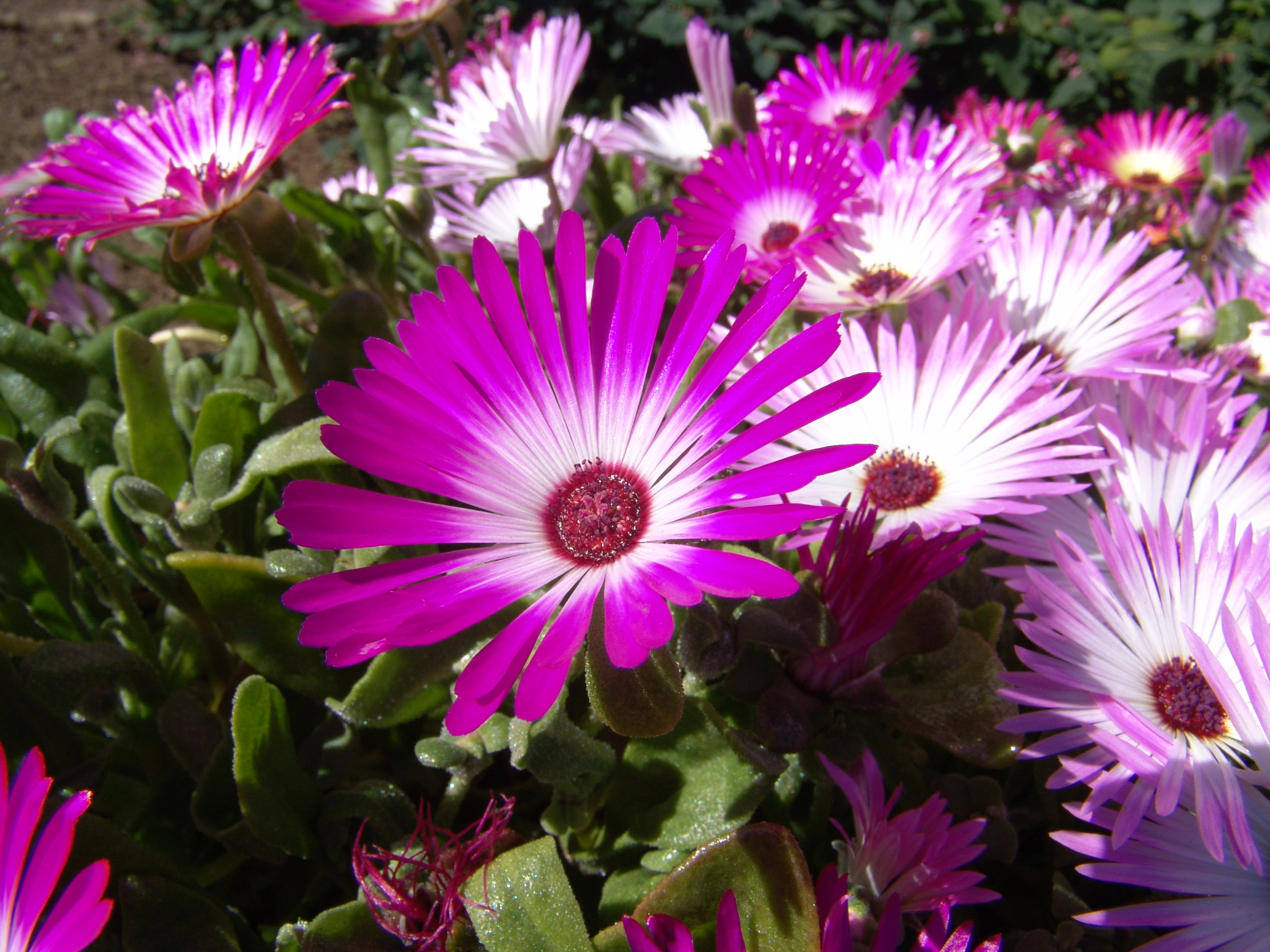
Flowers in the Akureyri Botanical Garden

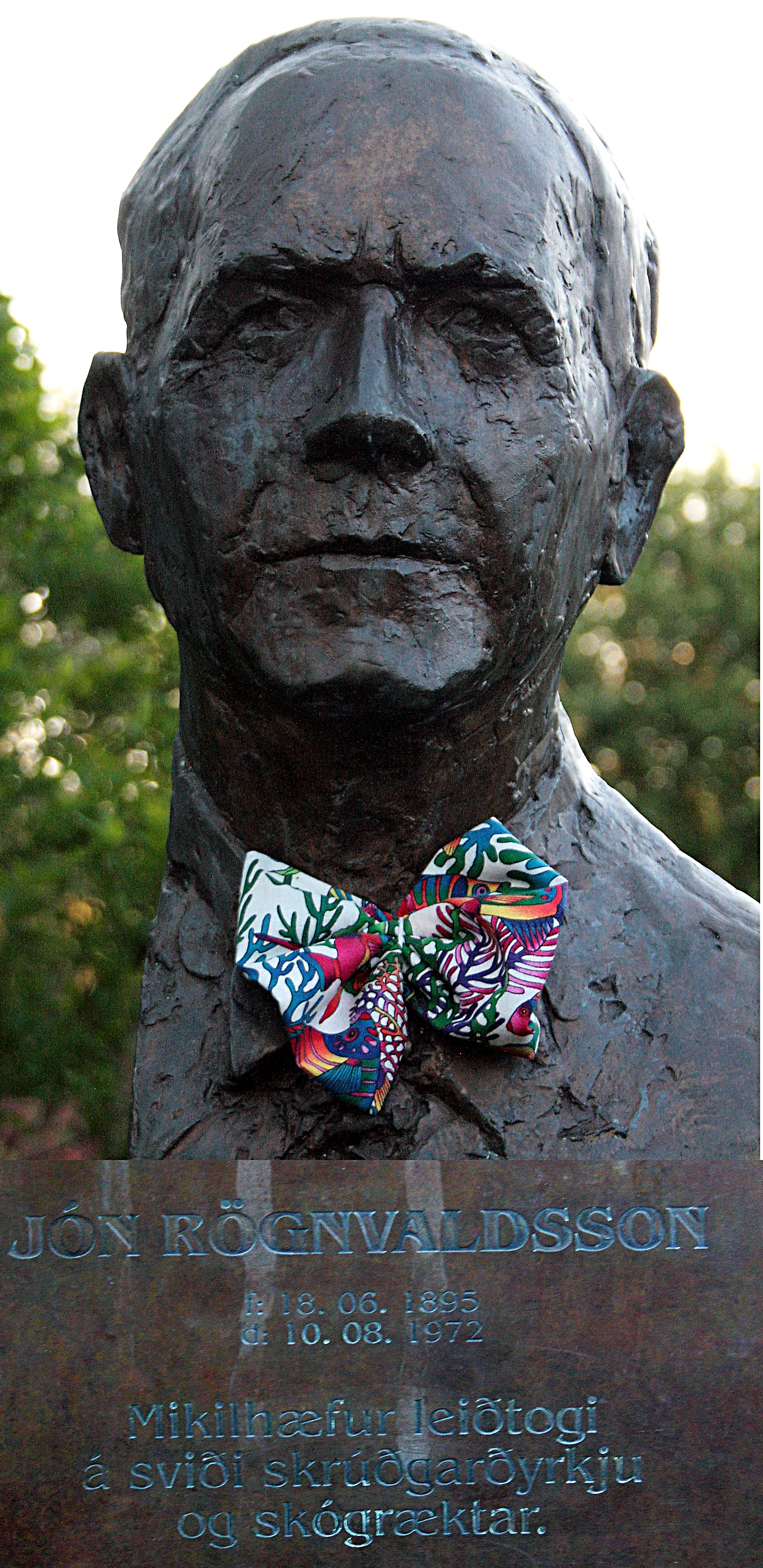
Bust of Jón Rögnvaldsson in the Garden

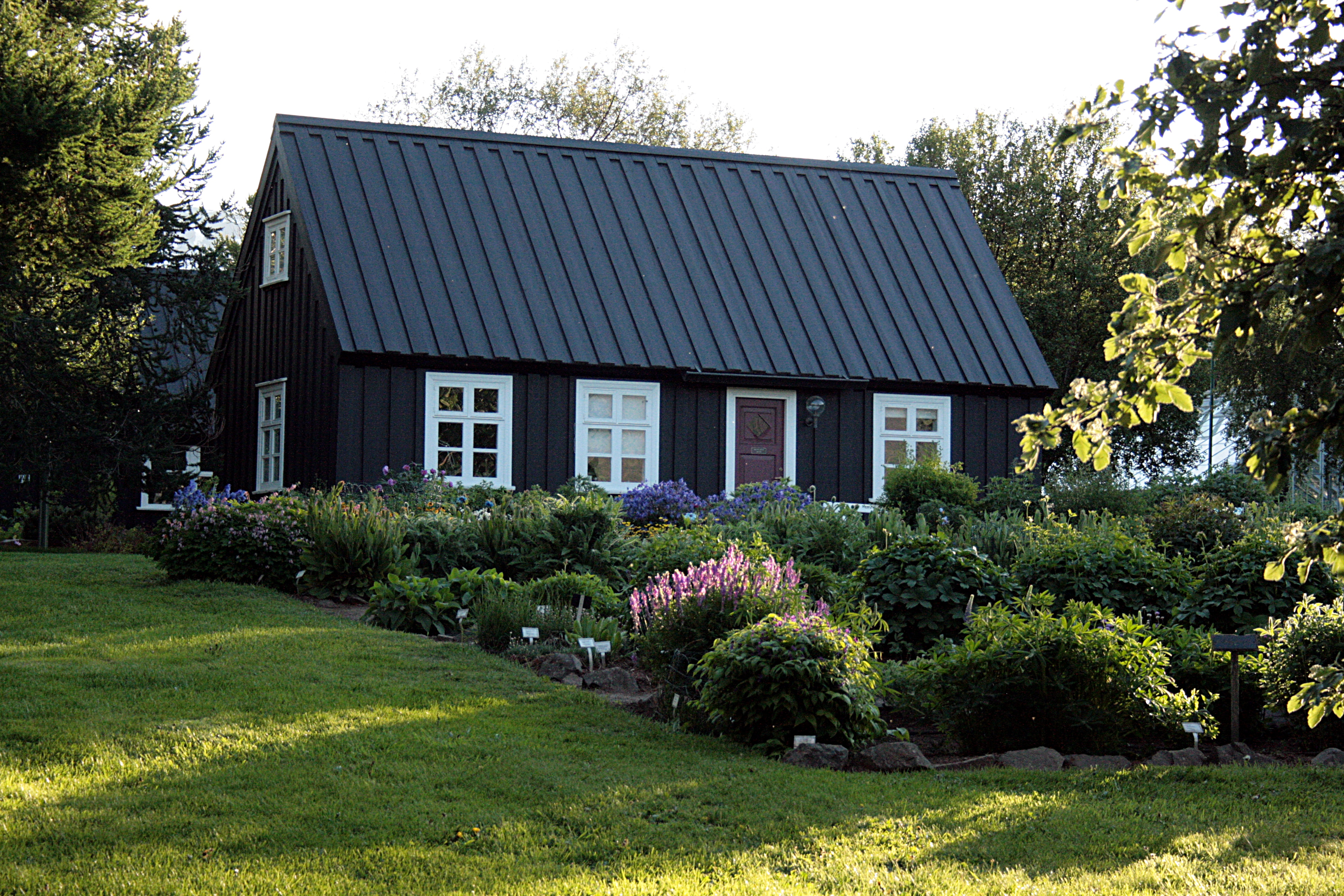
South Side of the Eyrarlandsstofa

The garden has its origins in 1910 when women from Akureyri founded the Park Association with the goal of beautifying their city. The city had granted them a hectare of land the previous year, making the Akureyri Botanical Garden the first public park in Iceland. Initially managed by the Park Society until 1953, the garden expanded to 3.6 hectares during this period. Over the years, the garden evolved into not just a place of beauty and tranquility but also a center for scientific research, demonstrating that various plants, including shrubs and trees, can thrive at the edge of the Arctic.

A notable contribution to the garden was made in 1957 when the city purchased Jón Rögnvaldsson's plant collection. Rögnvaldsson, along with Margarethe Schiöth, played a crucial role in the development of the garden, and both are commemorated with busts within the garden. Another bust honors Matthias Jochumsson, the clergyman and poet who wrote the Icelandic national anthem.

The garden hosts a diverse range of plant species, with around 400 species of Icelandic plants featured in its southeastern corner. By the end of 2007, the garden boasted approximately 7,000 species, including plants from arctic regions as well as those from temperate zones and high mountain areas. The garden is open year-round with free entrance, and during the summer, visitors can enjoy public toilets and a café offering coffee and light meals.

The garden also contains several wooden houses, including Eyrarlandsstofa, one of the oldest houses in Akureyri, adding to the historical and cultural significance of the site.
