= Keilir Golf Club =

Icelandic golf course

Keilir Golf Club is a golf club and course located in Hafnarfjördur, Iceland, on the Hvaleyri peninsula.

Keilir Golf Club was established in 1967. It was originally developed as a nine-hole course by Magnus Gudmundsson.

In 1971, the Swedish golf designer Nils Skjöld expanded the golf course to 12 holes. The course was expanded to 18-holes by Icelandic golf course designer Hannes Thorsteinsson.

The front nine holes are located in a lava field and the back nine holes on a former farmland.

== Tournaments ==
The Amstel Light Iceland Open is held jointly at Reykjavik Golf Club as well as at Keilir Golf Club during the summer solstice at the end of June each year since 2002. The tee times start at midnight.
