= Westman Islands Golf Club =

Icelandic golf course

Coordinates: 63°26′16.8684″N 20°17′48.534″W

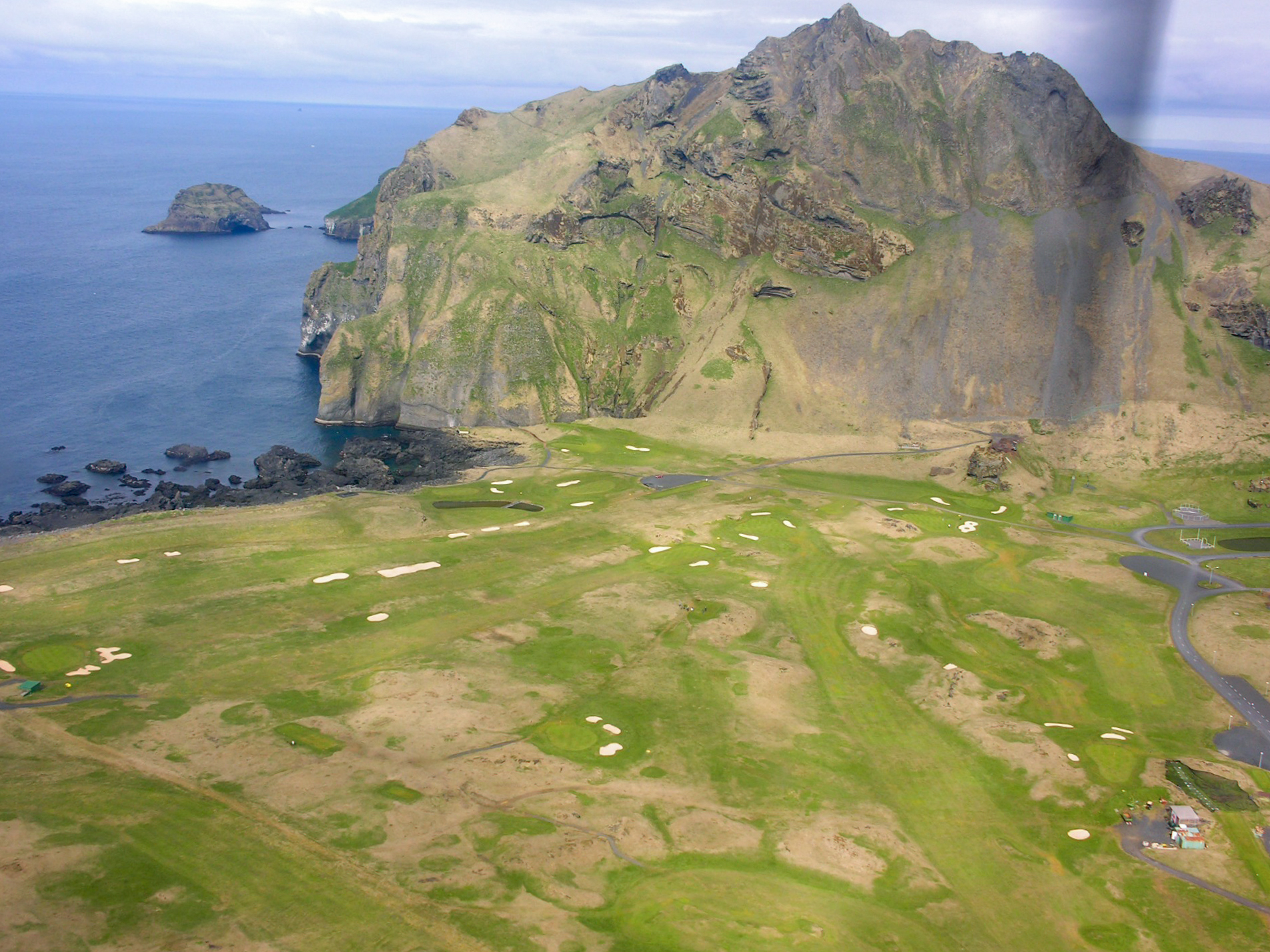
Westman Island Golf Club

The Westman Island Golf Club is a golf club located on the Westman Islands (Vestmannaeyjar in Icelandic), on the island of Heimaey off the southern coast of Iceland. The club was established in 1938 as a nine-hole course and is the third oldest golf club in Iceland. The course was expanded to 18 holes in the early 1990s by Hannes Thorsteinsson. It is the southernmost golf course in Iceland and is located in between an extinct volcano and the Atlantic Ocean.

Golf Monthly ranks it as one of the top 200 golf courses in Europe.

The current course is par 70 and 5,820 yards in length.

== Tournaments ==
The Icelandic Championship was hosted at The Westman Islands Golf Club in 1996 and 2008. The Scandinavian Championship for Amateurs was hosted at Westman Island Golf club in 2000. The Icelandair Volcano Open is held annually at The Westman Islands Golf Club at the beginning of July in dedication to the 1973 Eldfell volcano eruption. The volcano erupted on January 23, 1973 and ended six months later on July 3.
