= Seiden =

Seiden may refer to:

- the main hall of a Japanese castle
- the RG Veda manga

== People with the surname ==
- Esther Seiden (1908–2014), Polish-Israeli-American mathematical statistician
- Frank Seiden (c.1861-1931), American Yiddish singer and magician
- Joseph Seiden (1892–1974), director, producer of Yiddish films
- Lewis Seiden (1934–2007), American pharmacologist
- Rudolph A. Seiden (1900–1965), Austrian-American chemist
  - Celada-Seiden model
- Al Seiden, American basketball player
