= QuaMath =

German mathematical professional development program

QuaMath is a nationwide professional development program in Germany for advancing mathematics education with a ten-year duration (2023–2033). It is coordinated by the German Centre for Mathematics Teacher Education (DZLM) and targets teachers at all general education schools as well as instructors for early mathematical education at technical schools for social pedagogy. The program's goal is the sustainable improvement of mathematical education in Germany.

== Background ==
The development of QuaMath occurred due to declining mathematics performance of German students. The IQB Education Trend 2021 showed a decline in average mathematics performance among fourth-graders from 500 points (2011) to 462 points (2021). The proportion of elementary students who did not meet minimum standards increased from 15.8 percent (2016) to 21.8 percent (2021).[

In secondary education, according to the IQB Education Trend 2018, only 45 percent of ninth-graders achieved the regular standards in mathematics, while nearly a quarter failed to meet minimum standards. The IQB Education Trend 2024 confirmed this negative development: many ninth-graders again failed to reach the minimum standards, and average mathematics performance further declined compared to 2018. The international TIMSS 2023 study confirmed that 24 percent of German fourth-graders do not achieve basic competencies in mathematics.

In December 2021, The Standing Conference of the Ministers of Education and Cultural Affairs of the Länder in the Federal Republic of Germany (KMK) approved the establishment of the QuaMath program.

== Conception ==
=== The Five QuaMath Principles ===
Cognitive Demand aims to stimulate students to independent mathematical thinking and problem solving. Conceptual Focus focuses on building deep conceptual understanding of mathematical content instead of memorized "calculation recipes." The principle of Longitudinal Coherence ensures long-term and coherent learning processes where new content builds on what has already been learned and is systematically connected. Student Focus & Adaptivity consider individual learning needs and learning levels through differentiated learning opportunities. Enhanced Communication intensifies professional exchange in the classroom, as talking about mathematical ideas promotes understanding.

=== Scientific Foundations ===
These principles are grounded in teaching-learning research findings and were developed by the DZLM network. Current research demonstrates the effectiveness of teacher professional development that provides practical methods for typical classroom situations.

== Organization ==
=== Structure ===
The ten-year program is divided into two phases: The first phase (2023–2028) establishes structures, develops modules, and trains facilitators. These specially trained teachers serve as regional professional development leaders and disseminate content to other teachers. The second phase (2028–2033) refines and expands the program based on early experiences.

Approximately 1,000 schools will join the program annually, bringing the total to about 10,000 general education schools by 2033. This makes QuaMath the largest nationwide professional development program for mathematical education in Germany to date, reaching approximately 30 percent of all general education schools.

=== Leadership and Coordination ===
Scientific leadership is provided by Susanne Prediger (DZLM/IPN Kiel, TU Dortmund), Christoph Selter (TU Dortmund) and Hans Anand Pant (Humboldt University Berlin). The program is coordinated by the DZLM, which is housed within the Leibniz Institute for Science and Mathematics Education in the Department of Subject-Specific Knowledge Transfer (FET). Twenty-eight professors from the DZLM network are involved in module development.

=== Financing ===
The participating federal states provide 17.6 million euros for the first program phase. Additionally, they invest annually approximately 5.5 million euros in their QuaMath state coordinators as well as in the QuaMath facilitators.

== Implementation ==
The program comprises 27 modules across three categories: foundation modules on instructional quality, content modules on mathematical topics, and specialized modules focusing on areas such as differentiation and language development.[13] Schools form regional networks with three to five teachers per school. The professional development process spans three years.

15 of the 16 German federal states participate in QuaMath; Thüringen does not participate. Concrete implementation occurs considering the various school systems, existing professional development structures, and regional priorities of the federal states.

== Research and Evaluation ==
Accompanying research is conducted by a consortium of twelve universities and the Leibniz IPN, examining facilitator competency development, the effectiveness of professional development concepts, and impacts on teaching practice and student learning.

Initial empirical studies are already providing insights into program implementation: A 2024 study by the University of Education Freiburg analyzed attitudes toward high-quality mathematics instruction among 230 facilitators. Thirty-nine percent of responses aligned with the five QuaMath principles. The study also found that facilitators themselves focus more strongly on pedagogical concepts, while they expect teachers to orient toward superficial instructional features.

A 2023 pilot study by the University of Münster examined the action-guiding orientations of 350 facilitators regarding the five QuaMath principles. Results showed the highest alignment with Longitudinal Coherence and the lowest with Cognitive Demand.

Comprehensive evaluation results are expected in 2026.

== Reception ==
QuaMath is considered the successor to the SINUS-Transfer Program (1998–2013). Unlike SINUS, QuaMath features closer integration of research and practice, use of digital media, and a more systematic approach. Susanne Prediger emphasized the difference from earlier programs: "We researchers are taking direct responsibility for the process rather than simply analyzing what went wrong afterward."

Experts identify several challenges: The ten-year timeframe requires staff continuity amid an ongoing teacher shortage.[25] Transferring professional development content into daily teaching practice remains a central challenge.

Practitioners call for more release time for participating teachers and stronger networking among participating schools.

== Literature ==
- Holzer, J., Grützmacher, L., Ludwig, S., Bacher, J., Dumont, H., Kampa, N., Krainer, K., Lüftenegger, M., Maaz, K., Pant, H. A., Prenzel, M., Spiel, C., & Schober, B. (2025). Bildung gemeinsam gestalten: Empfehlungen für Projekte in Kooperation zwischen Wissenschaft, Politik und Praxis. Zeitschrift für Erziehungswissenschaft, 28, 151–179. DOI: 10.1007/s11618-024-01273-0
- Steinweg, A. S. (Ed.). (2024). Schule im Wandel–Mathematikunterricht im Wandel: Tagungsband des AK Grundschule in der GDM 2024 (Vol. 13). University of Bamberg Press. DOI: 10.20378/irb-104036.
- Prediger, S., & Selter, C. (2024). Establish shared visions and support productive adaptations on all levels: Aims, strategies, and architecture of a nationwide implementation program. Implementation and Replication Studies in Mathematics Education, 4(1), 1–35. DOI:10.1163/26670127-bja10020.
- Prediger, S., Götze, D., Holzäpfel, L., Rösken-Winter, B., & Selter, C. (2022). Five principles for high-quality mathematics teaching: Combining normative, epistemological, empirical, and pragmatic perspectives for specifying the content of professional development. Frontiers in Education, 7, Article 969212, 1–15. DOI:10.3389/feduc.2022.969212.
