= Systems immunology =

Systems immunology is a research field under systems biology that uses mathematical approaches and computational methods to examine the interactions within cellular and molecular networks of the immune system. The immune system has been thoroughly analyzed as regards to its components and function by using a "reductionist" approach, but its overall function can't be easily predicted by studying the characteristics of its isolated components because they strongly rely on the interactions among these numerous constituents. It focuses on in silico experiments rather than in vivo.

Recent studies in experimental and clinical immunology have led to development of mathematical models that discuss the dynamics of both the innate and adaptive immune system. Most of the mathematical models were used to examine processes in silico that can't be done in vivo. These processes include: the activation of T cells, cancer-immune interactions, migration and death of various immune cells (e.g. T cells, B cells and neutrophils) and how the immune system will respond to a certain vaccine or drug without carrying out a clinical trial.

== Techniques of modelling in Immune cells ==
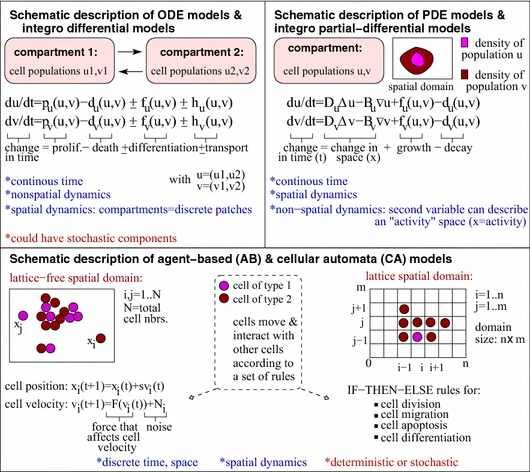
A scheme that describes how mathematical models are used in immunology.

The techniques that are used in immunology for modelling have a quantitative and qualitative approach, where both have advantages and disadvantages. Quantitative models predict certain kinetic parameters and the behavior of the system at a certain time point or concentration point. The disadvantage is that it can only be applied to a small number of reactions and prior knowledge about some kinetic parameters is needed. On the other hand, qualitative models can take into account more reactions but in return they provide less details about the kinetics of the system. The only thing in common is that both approaches lose simplicity and become useless when the number of components drastically increase.

=== Ordinary Differential Equation model ===
Ordinary differential equations (ODEs) are used to describe the dynamics of biological systems. ODEs are used on a microscopic, mesoscopic and macroscopic scale to examine continuous variables. The equations represent the time evolution of observed variables such as concentrations of protein, transcription factors or number of cell types. They are usually used for modelling immunological synapses, microbial recognition and cell migration. Over the last 10 years, these models have been used to study the sensitivity of TCR to agonist ligands and the roles of CD4 and CD8 co-receptors.
Kinetic rates of these equations are represented by binding and dissociation rates of the interacting species. These models are able to present the concentration and steady state of each interacting molecule in the network. ODE models are defined by linear and non-linear equations, where the nonlinear ones are used more often because they are easier to simulate on a computer (in silico) and to analyse. The limitation of this model is that for every network, the kinetics of each molecule has to be known so that this model could be applied.

The ODE model was used to examine how antigens bind to the B cell receptor. This model was very complex because it was represented by 1122 equations and six signalling proteins. The software tool that was used for the research was BioNetGen. The outcome of the model is according to the in vivo experiment.

The Epstein-Barr virus (EBV) was mathematically modeled with 12 equations to investigate three hypotheses that explain the higher occurrence of mononucleosis in younger people. After running numerical simulations, only the first two hypotheses were supported by the model.

=== Partial Differential Equation model ===
Partial differential equation (PDE) models are an extended version of the ODE model, which describes the time evolution of each variable in both time and space. PDEs are used on a microscopic level for modeling continuous variables in the sensing and recognition of pathogens pathway. They are also applied for physiological modeling to describe how proteins interact and where their movement is directed in an immunological synapse. These derivatives are partial because they are calculated with the respect to time and also with the respect to space. Sometimes a physiological variable such as age in cell division can be used instead of the spatial variables. Comparing the PDE models, which take into account the spatial distribution of cells, to the ODE ones, the PDEs are computationally more demanding. Spatial dynamics are an important aspect of cell signalling as it describes the motion of cells within a three dimensional compartment. T cells move around in a three dimensional lymph node while TCRs are located on the surface of cell membranes and therefore move within a two dimensional compartment. The spatial distribution of proteins is important especially upon T cell stimulation, when an immunological synapse is made, therefore this model was used in a study where the T cell was activated by a weak agonist peptide.

=== Particle-based Stochastic model ===
Particle-based stochastic models are obtained based on the dynamics of an ODE model. What differs this model from others, is that it considers the components of the model as discrete variables, not continuous like the previous ones. They examine particles on a microscopic and mesoscopic level in immune-specific transduction pathways and immune cells-cancer interactions, respectively. The dynamics of the model are determined by the Markov process, which in this case, expresses the probability of each possible state in the system upon time in a form of differential equations. The equations are difficult to solve analytically, so simulations on the computer are performed as kinetic Monte Carlo schemes. The simulation is commonly carried out with the Gillespie algorithm, which uses reaction constants that are derived from chemical kinetic rate constants to predict whether a reaction is going to occur. Stochastic simulations are more computationally demanding and therefore the size and scope of the model is limited.

The stochastic simulation was used to show that the Ras protein, which is a crucial signalling molecule in T cells, can have an active and inactive form. It provided insight to a population of lymphocytes that upon stimulation had active and inactive subpopulations.

Co-receptors have an important role in the earliest stages of T cell activation and a stochastic simulation was used to explain the interactions as well as to model the migrating cells in a lymph node.

This model was used to examine T cell proliferation in the lymphoid system.

=== Agent-based models ===
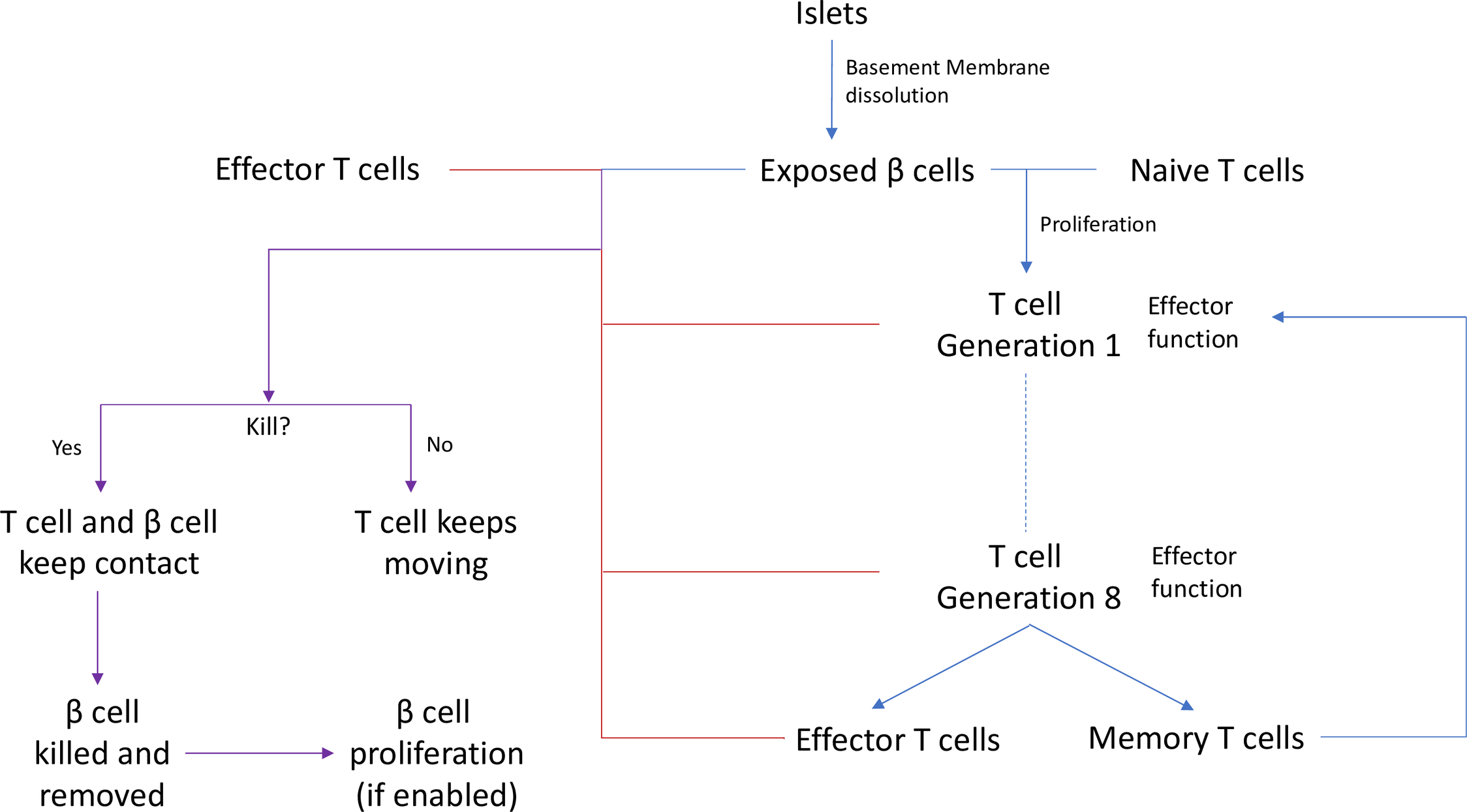
Summary of interactions between CD8+ T cells and Beta cells in Diabetes I

Agent-based modeling (ABM) is a type of modelling where the components of the system that are being observed, are treated as discrete agents and represent an individual molecule or cell. The components - agents, called in this system, can interact with other agents and the environment. ABM has the potential to observe events on a multiscale level and is becoming more popular in other disciplines. It has been used for modelling the interactions between CD8+ T cells and Beta cells in Diabetes I and modelling the rolling and activation of leukocytes.

=== Boolean model ===
Logic models are used to model the life cycles of cells, immune synapse, pathogen recognition and viral entries on a microscopic and mesoscopic level. Unlike the ODE models, details about the kinetics and concentrations of interacting species isn't required in logistic models. Each biochemical species is represented as a node in the network and can have a finite number of discrete states, usually two, for example: ON/OFF, high/low, active/inactive. Usually, logic models, with only two states are considered as Boolean models. When a molecule is in the OFF state, it means that the molecule isn't present at a high enough level to make a change in the system, not that it has zero concentration. Therefore, when it is in the ON state it has reached a high enough amount to initiate a reaction. This method was first introduced by Kauffman. The limit of this model is that it can only provide qualitative approximations of the system and it can't perfectly model concurrent events.

This method has been used to explore special pathways in the immune system such as affinity maturation and hypermutation in the humoral immune system and tolerance to pathologic rheumatoid factors. Simulation tools that support this model are DDlab, Cell-Devs and IMMSIM-C. IMMSIM-C is used more often than the others, as it doesn't require knowledge in the computer programming field. The platform is available as a public web application and finds usage in undergraduate immunology courses at various universities (Princeton, Genoa, etc.).

For modelling with statecharts, only Rhapsody has been used so far in systems immunology. It can translate the statechart into executable Java and C++ codes.

This method was also used to build a model of the Influenza Virus Infection. Some of the results were not in accordance with earlier research papers and the Boolean network showed that the amount of activated macrophages increased for both young and old mice, while others suggest that there is a decrease.

The SBML (Systems Biology Markup Language) was supposed to cover only models with ordinary differential equations, but recently it was upgraded so that Boolean models could be applied. Almost all modeling tools are compatible with SBML. There are a few more software packages for modeling with Boolean models: BoolNet, GINsim and Cell Collective.

== Computer tools ==
To model a system by using differential equations, the computer tool has to perform various tasks such as model construction, calibration, verification, analysis, simulation and visualization. There isn't a single software tool that satisfies the mentioned criteria, so multiple tools need to be used.

=== GINsim ===
GINsim is a computer tool that generates and simulates genetic networks based on discrete variables. Based on the regulatory graphs and logical parameters, GINsim calculates the temporal evolution of the system which is returned as a State Transition Graph (STG) where the states are represented by nodes and transitions by arrows.
It was used to examine how T cells respond upon activation of the TCR and TLR5 pathway. These processes were observed both separately and in combination. First, the molecular maps and logic models for both TCR and TLR5 pathways were built and then merged. Molecular maps were produced in CellDesigner based on data from literature and various databases, such as KEGG and Reactome. The logical models were generated by GINsim where each component has the value of either 0 or 1 or additional values when modified. Logical rules are then applied to each component, which are called logical nodes in this network. After merging the final model consists of 128 nodes. The results of modelling were in accordance with the experimental ones, where it was demonstrated that the TLR5 is a costimulatory receptor for CD4+ T cells.

=== Boolnet ===
Boolnet is a R package which contains tools for reconstruction, analysis and visualization of Boolean networks.

=== Cell Collective ===
The Cell Collective is a scientific platform which enables scientists to build, analyse and simulate biological models without formulating mathematical equations and coding. It has a Knowledge Base component built in it which extends the knowledge of individual entities (proteins, genes, cells, etc.) into dynamical models. The data is qualitative but it takes into account the dynamical relationship between the interacting species. The models are simulated in real-time and everything is done on the web.

=== BioNetGen ===
BioNetGen (BNG) is an open-source software package that is used in rule-based modeling of complex systems such as gene regulation, cell signaling and metabolism. The software uses graphs to represent different molecules and their functional domains and rules to explain the interactions between them. In terms of immunology, it was used to model intracellular signalling pathways of the TLR-4 cascade.

=== DSAIRM ===
DSAIRM (Dynamical Systems Approach to Immune Response Modeling) is a R package that is designed for studying infection and immune response dynamics without prior knowledge of coding.

Other useful applications and learning environments are: Gepasi, Copasi, BioUML, Simbiology (MATLAB) and Bio-SPICE.

== Conferences ==
The first conference in Synthetic and Systems Immunology was hosted in Ascona by CSF and ETH Zurich. It took place in the first days of May 2019 where over fifty researchers, from different scientific fields were involved. Among all presentations that were held, the best went to Dr. Govinda Sharma who invented a platform for screening TCR epitopes.

Cold Spring Harbor Laboratory (CSHL) from New York, in March 2019, hosted a meeting where the focus was to exchange ideas between experimental, computational and mathematical biologists that study the immune system in depth. The topics for the meeting where: Modelling and Regulatory networks, the future of Synthetic and Systems Biology and Immunoreceptors.
