= Kiel University =

University in Germany

- Christian-Albrechts-Universität zu Kiel
- Seal of Kiel University
- Latin: Academia Holsatorum Chiloniensis sive Christiana Albertina
- Motto: Pax optima rerum
- Motto in English: Peace is the greatest good
- Type: Public
- Established: 1665; 361 years ago
- Budget: €223.7 million (2024); Third-party funding: €77.5 mio
- President: Vacancy
- Academic staff: 431 professors (2024)
- Total staff: 3,870 (2024, not including UKSH)
- Students: 24,925 (2024)
- Location: Kiel, Schleswig-Holstein, Germany; 54°20′20″N 10°7′21″E
- Campus: Urban
- Colors: Purple and white
- Website: www.uni-kiel.de

Kiel University (German: Christian-Albrechts-Universität zu Kiel, abbreviated CAU, known informally as Christiana Albertina) is a public research university in the city of Kiel, Germany. It was founded in 1665 as the Academia Holsatorum Chiloniensis by Christian Albert, Duke of Holstein-Gottorp. It is the largest, oldest, and most prestigious university in the state of Schleswig-Holstein.

Until 1866, it was not only the northernmost university in Germany but at the same time the second-largest university of Denmark. After the Danish-German war, Kiel came under Prussian administration which later led to being part of the German Empire and today the Federal Republic of Germany. Kiel is the capital of Schleswig-Holstein, and Kiel University is the largest and only comprehensive university in the federal state.

Faculty, alumni, and researchers of Kiel University have won 12 Nobel Prizes. Kiel University has been a member of the German Universities Excellence Initiative since 2006. The Cluster of Excellence The Future Ocean, which was established in cooperation with the GEOMAR Helmholtz Centre for Ocean Research Kiel in 2006 and existed until 2019, has been internationally recognized.

Since 2018, Kiel University has had two Clusters of Excellence. "Precision Medicine in Chronic Inflammation (PMI)" deals with chronic inflammatory diseases and is closely tied to the University Medical Center Schleswig Holstein, the University of Lübeck, the Research Centre Borstel – Leibniz Lung Centre, the Max Planck Institute for Evolutionary Biology, the Muthesius Academy of Art, the Kiel Institute for the World Economy and the Leibniz Institute for Science and Mathematics Education at Kiel University. "ROOTS - Social, Environmental, and Cultural Connectivity in Past Societies" explores the roots of social, environmental, and cultural phenomena and processes that substantially marked past human development. It is an interdisciplinary research network involving scientists from 15 institutes at six faculties of Kiel University. There are also project partners in Germany and abroad. The university has a great reputation for its focus on public international law. The oldest public international law institution in Germany and Europe – the Walther Schuecking Institute for International Law – is based in Kiel.

The university works closely with the internationally renowned GEOMAR Helmholtz Centre for Ocean Research Kiel and the Kiel Institute for the World Economy (IfW), which is associated with the university. Through a number of joint appointments, the CAU also has close personnel ties with both institutions.

In 2024, 24,925 students were enrolled at Kiel University. The university is organised into eight faculties, where over 400 professors teach. The university offers more than 190 degree programmes.

== History ==
=== Founding of the University in Kiel ===
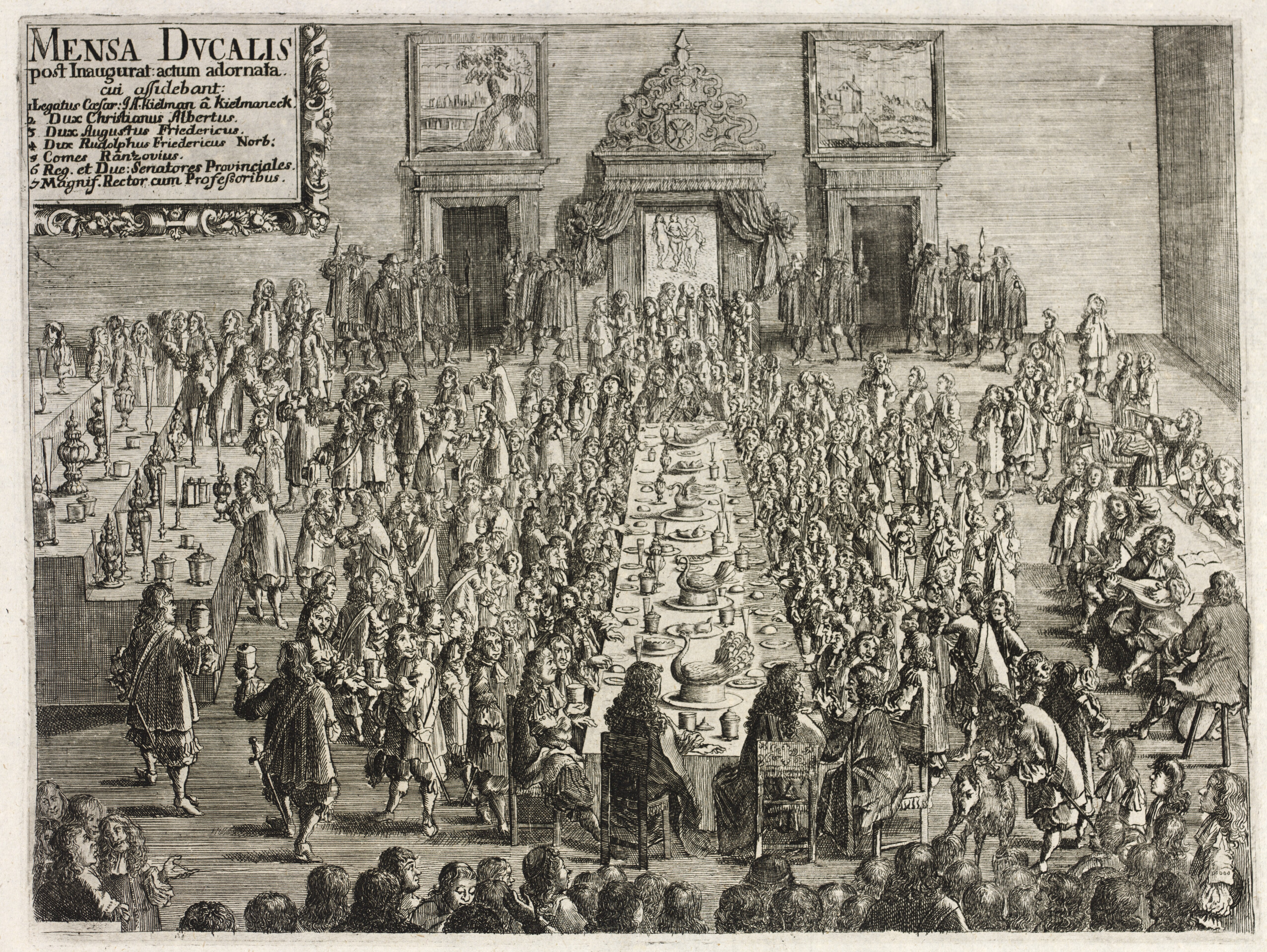
The inauguration of Kiel University.

The origins of the university in Kiel trace back to the increasing need for well-educated priests during the Reformation. Additionally, the growing involvement of citizens in significant administrative roles contributed to the idea of establishing a university in the duchies. However, wars in the early 17th century and political conflicts between dukes and the king initially delayed these plans. Eventually, Duke Friedrich III commissioned his son, Christian Albrecht, to advance the founding of the university. In 1660, Christian Albrecht succeeded in realizing these plans and selected Kiel as the university's location. On October 5, 1665, the university was inaugurated under the name Christiana Albertina in a former Franciscan monastery with four lecture halls and a library. At that time, 17 professors taught theology, medicine, law, and the liberal arts.

=== Periods of Growth and Stagnation ===
A significant growth period for the university occurred a century later under Russian Empress Catherine the Great, from whom it received its colors, purple and white. After the death of her husband, who had been born in Kiel, Catherine commissioned the architect Ernst Georg Sonnin to construct a new university building This plain brick building with rusticated articulation was ready for occupation in 1768 after a two-year construction period. Lectures were held here until 1876. From 1877 until its destruction during World War II, the building served as a museum. Following the unification of the duchies in 1773, the university continued to flourish as the northernmost German and southernmost Scandinavian university.

Nearly 100 years later, the university's development stagnated. With the Second Schleswig War, the rule of the Kingdom of Denmark over the Duchy of Schleswig and the Duchy of Holstein came to an end. After the Austro-Prussian War, the two former duchies became the Prussian Province of Schleswig-Holstein in 1867. Kiel also came under Prussian administration. The Kiel University lost its legal privileges and was now the smallest of the ten universities in Prussia. From 1870, student numbers began to rise again, and 38 years later, women were also admitted.

=== During and after WWII ===
Acceptance of Nazism was high from an early stage, not only among professors but also among students in Kiel: as early as 1927, Joachim Haupt, an official of the National Socialist German Students' League, was elected chairman of the Kiel Student League. During the Nazi regime starting in 1933, the university experienced Gleichschaltung, the expulsion of Jewish professors, and the persecution of dissenters. According to recent studies, 36 out of 222 members of the teaching staff in Kiel were expelled (17.1%) or dismissed (16.2%) during the Nazi era for racial or political reasons.

In World War II, many buildings were destroyed by Allied air raids, including the university library in 1942. By the end of the war, 60–61% of Kiel University had been destroyed.

=== Post-War Reconstruction and Expansion ===
With the support of the British, teaching resumed as early as November 1945, initially on ships. In the 1960s, a new campus was developed on the Kiel Westring. The student protests of the late 1960s led to a modernization of the university's structure. The campus was expanded in 1972 with buildings on Olshausenstraße and new sports facilities, and in 1991, the Faculty of Engineering opened in Kiel-Gaarden. The number of students steadily increased and now stands at about 25,000 to 30,000. The Christian-Albrecht University has not only become an internationally respected university but also one of the largest employers in Kiel.

=== New developments ===
In the 2014/2015 winter semester, more than 25,000 students were enrolled at CAU for the first time.

In 2015, Kiel University celebrated its 350th anniversary. To mark the anniversary, the Institute of Prehistory and Early History erected a reconstruction of the Neolithic megalithic tomb Wangels LA 69 on campus, using methods faithful to the original.

Since 2016, buildings on the campus of Kiel University have been gradually renovated or rebuilt. In addition to work on the main campus, new buildings have been constructed for individual departments, including the Agricultural Sciences, which now house a computer centre. At the Bremerskamp site, a new quarter was developed that combines university facilities with residential accommodation. Among other things, a new building for evolutionary research, known as the Amöbe, was constructed there. Two new research and laboratory buildings were built for the Faculty of Medicine.

In 2020, the Academic Senate approved the establishment of the interdisciplinary Master School of Marine Sciences (iMSMS). It evolved from the previously existing Ocean Education Initiative and combines interdisciplinary teaching programmes in the field of marine sciences.

In March 2023, a decision was also taken to renovate the Kunsthalle Kiel, at a cost of around 49.5 million euros. The Kunsthalle is a university institution. The renovation work mainly involves technical and structural upgrades, as well as the modernisation of the exhibition and educational areas.

In November 2025, the university, together with eight European partner universities, signed the legal framework for the establishment of the SEA-EU Association. The European University of the Seas (SEA-EU) alliance, which has existed since 2019 as part of the Erasmus+ programme, was thus given its own legal structure. This is intended to enable the partner universities to continue their collaboration beyond the current funding period.

== Organisation ==
The Chancellor oversees the administration of the university under the responsibility of the President. The executive board consists of Chancellor Claudia Ricarda Meyer and Vice-presidents Catherine Cleophas, Markus Hundt, Ralph Schneider and Eckhard Quandt. The position of President has been vacant since early 2025.

Central Administration is divided into several service centres: the Student Affairs and International Relations Service Centre, the Strategy, Research and Integrated Transfer Service Centre, and the Resources Service Centre.

=== Faculties ===
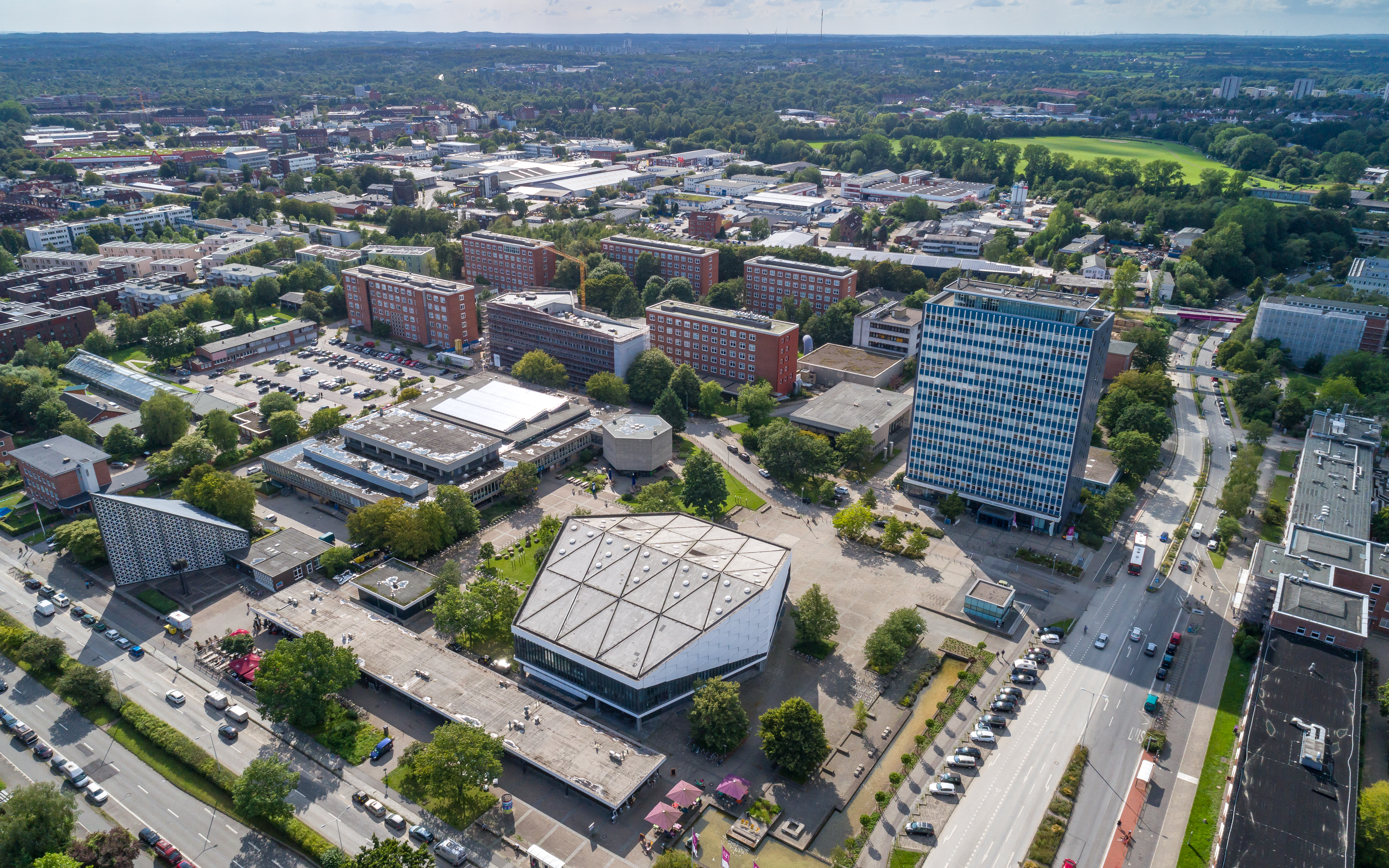
Aerial view of the central campus

Christian-Albrechts-Universität currently consists of the following eight faculties:

- Faculty of Theology
- Faculty of Law
- Faculty of Business, Economics and Social Sciences
- Faculty of Medicine
- Faculty of Arts and Humanities
- Faculty of Mathematics and Natural Sciences
- Faculty of Agricultural Science and Nutritional Sciences
- Faculty of Engineering

=== Key figures ===
In the 2024/25 winter semester, 24,925 students were enrolled; 54.75% of these were female (13,647 students). The majority of students come from Schleswig-Holstein, Hamburg and Lower Saxony.

In the 2024 academic year, 6,446 people began their studies, of whom 3,689 were women and 2,757 were men. In the same year, 3,826 students graduated, including 2,241 women and 1,585 men. The number of doctorates awarded was 401, of which 192 were completed by women and 209 by men. In the calendar year 2024, 23 postdoctoral qualifications were recorded (6 by women and 17 by men).

In 2024, 3,870 people were employed at the university; 1,932 of them were women and 1,938 were men. The number of university professors was 431. State funding amounted to €223.7 million in 2024, whilst expenditure from third-party funding was €77.5 million.

As of April 2025, 1,303 students are enrolled across the faculties at Kiel University.

Student employees at CAU Kiel by faculty
Faculty	Number of employed students
Faculty of Agricultural and Nutritional Sciences	97
Faculty of Mathematics and Natural Sciences	305
Faculty of Theology	39
Faculty of Engineering	115
Faculty of Law	104
Faculty of Arts and Humanities	395
Faculty of Medicine	13
Faculty of Business, Economics and Social Sciences	128
Central institutions, clusters of excellence, collaborative research centres	107

== Locations and facilities ==
=== Central units ===
Central facilities of Kiel University include the University Library (newly opened in 2001), the Computing Centre (RZ), the Sports Centre, the Digital Science Centre, the Interdisciplinary Multimedia Centre, the Research and Technology Centre, West Coast (FTZ) in Büsum, the Graduate Centre, the Postdoc Centre and the Institute for Inclusive Education.

Kiel University Library is located on the campus on Leibnizstraße and opened in 2001 in a new building. As of 2024, its collection includes around 2.5 million printed books and journals, as well as more than 135,000 e-books and over 33,000 electronic journals. In addition, it provides access to more than 600 databases and contains extensive historical collections, including over 6,000 manuscripts and autographs. Alongside the central library, there are several departmental libraries. In total, more than 1,100 study spaces are available to users within the library buildings.

=== Affiliated institutes ===
Kiel University includes other independent institutions which, in accordance with Section 35 of the Schleswig-Holstein Higher Education Act (HSG), assume the status of a university institution:

- Institute for Security Policy
- Kiel Institute for the World Economy (IfW)
- Leibniz Institute for Science and Mathematics Education (IPN)
- ZBW – Leibniz Information Centre for Economics
- Lorenz-von-Stein-Institute for Administrative Sciences
- GEOMAR Helmholtz Centre for Ocean Research Kiel
- University Medical Center Schleswig Holstein (UKSH)
- Schleswig-Holstein State Museums Foundation Schloss Gottorf
- Archaeological Museum Schloss Gottorf
- Museum of Art and Cultural History Schloss Gottorf
- Viking Museum Haithabu
- Open-Air Museum Molfsee - State Museum for Ethnology
- Jewish Museum in Rendsburg
- Ornamental Cast Iron Museum Büdelsdorf
- Cismar Monastery

=== Institutions associated with Kiel University ===
- Research Center Borstel
- GEOMAR | Helmholtz Centre for Ocean Research Kiel
- Helmholtz-Zentrum Geesthacht, Centre for Materials and Coastal Research
- Max Planck Institute for Evolutionary Biology
- Max Rubner-Institut: Department of Microbiology and Biotechnology, Kiel
- Max Rubner-Institut: Department of Safety and Quality of Milk and Fish Products, Kiel
- Radiation safety seminar
- University Hospital Schleswig-Holstein

=== Research and study centres ===
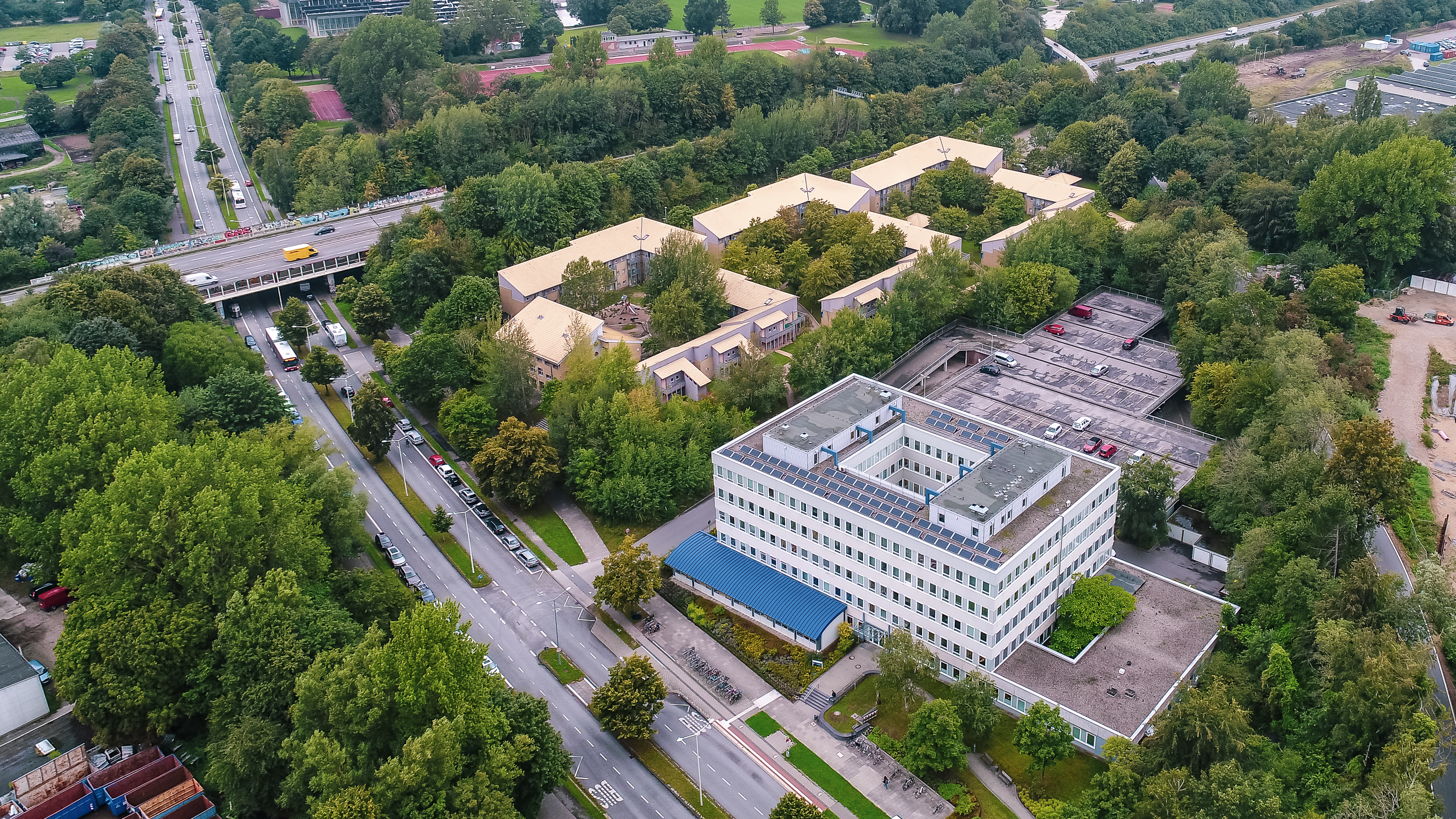
The Leibniz Institute for Science and Mathematics Education (IPN) on Olshausenstraße.

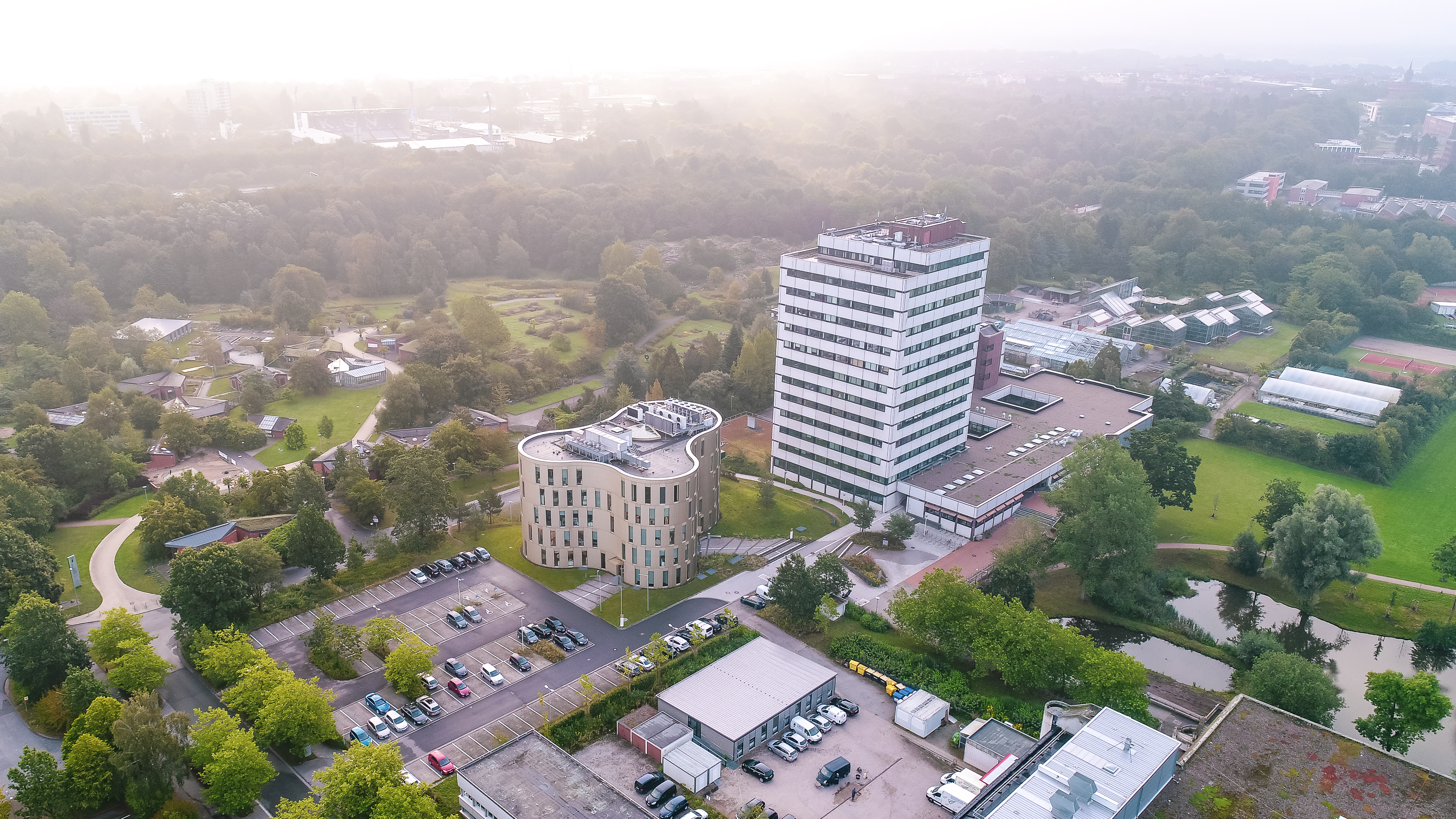
The Centre for Molecular Biosciences (ZMB) of Kiel University at the Botanical Garden.

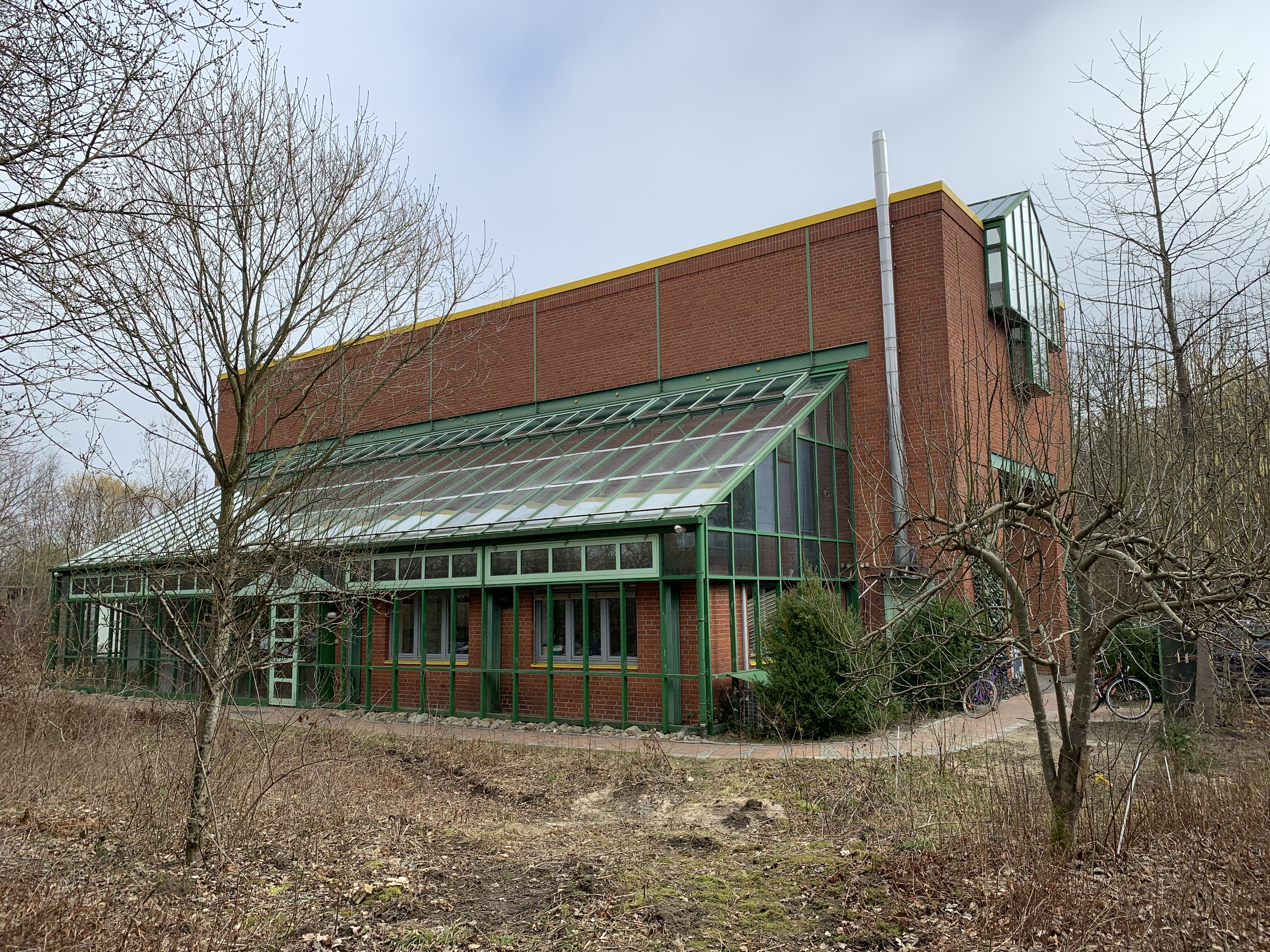
Ecosystem research on Olshausenstraße.

Further centres at Kiel University:

- German-Norwegian Study Centre (DNSZ)
- Molecular Imaging North Competence Centre (MOIN CC)
- GEOMAR Helmholtz Centre for Ocean Research Kiel
- Hermann Kantorowicz Institute for Fundamental Legal Research (HKI)
- Institute for Security Policy Kiel University (ISPK)
- Kiel Institute for the World Economy (IfW)
- Leibniz Institute for Science and Mathematics Education (IPN)
- Lorenz-von-Stein-Institute for Administrative Sciences
- Walther Schücking Institute for International Law (WSI)
- Zentrum für asiatische und afrikanische Studien (ZAAS)
- Centre for Biochemistry and Molecular Biology (BiMo)
- Gustav Radbruch Network for Philosophy and Ethics of the Environment
- Key Skills Centre (ZfS)
- Centre of Clinical Anatomy (ZKA)
- Zentrum für Lehrerbildung (ZfL)
- Centre for Molecular Biosciences (ZMB)
- Centre of North American Studies (ZNAS)
- Zentrum für Osteuropastudien (ZOS)
- Centre for Ocean and Society (CeOS)
- China Centre

== Academics ==
=== Courses ===
The university offers more than 190 degree programmes leading to different types of qualifications, including bachelor's, master's and state examination programmes, as well as PhD opportunities. The degree programmes are organised across the university's eight faculties.

Teacher training takes place within teacher training programmes designed for different school types. In the field of teacher education, the university collaborates with, amongst others, the Leibniz Institute for Science and Mathematics Education (IPN). Institutions such as the Institute for Inclusive Education are also involved in teacher training and qualification. The university participates in the Alliance for Teacher Training in Schleswig-Holstein.

In addition, there are interdisciplinary study programmes and international degree courses, including a number of English-language Master's programmes. The cross-faculty programmes include, amongst others, the interdisciplinary Master School of Marine Sciences, which combines teaching modules on marine science topics from different disciplines, as well as the Kiel School of Sustainability, which organises Master's programmes and courses on sustainable development.

In addition to standard degree programmes, there are a variety of ways to engage with university life, including a junior degree programme for school pupils, guest and part-time student status, and the option of a dual degree programme. Students can also complete certificate programmes in specific subject areas.

The Centre for Key Competencies (ZfS) offers courses and language classes designed to develop interdisciplinary skills.

=== Continuing Professional Development ===
The Continuing Professional Development Centre sees itself as an interface between scientific findings from the university and the requirements of professional practice. The Centre has been the continuing education provider at Kiel University since 1996. It offers seminars for specialists and managers, internal and external (scientific) university staff, students and graduates.

It offers seminars for professionals and managers, academic staff, as well as students and graduates. These include fee-paying master's-level continuing education programmes, as well as certificate programmes and other professional development opportunities. Part-time degree programmes include, amongst others, the Master's programme in Hospital Management, which is aimed specifically at doctors and prepares them for management roles in the healthcare sector, as well as the Master's programme in School Management and Quality Development, which is aimed at teachers and management staff in the education sector.

Collaborative Research Centres
Collaborative Research Centre	Spokesperson	Term
CRC 1461: Neurotronics: Bio-inspired Information Pathways	Prof. Dr. Hermann Kohlstedt	2021–2025
CRC 1261: Magnetoelectric Sensors: from Composite Materials to Biomagnetic Diagnostics	Prof. Dr.-Ing. Gerhard Schmidt	2016–2028
CRC 1182: Origin and Function of Metaorganisms	Prof. Dr. Hinrich Schulenburg	2015–2027

European Research Council (ERC)

Grant	Acronym	Project title	Principal investigator	Duration
Starting	MobiChrom	Mobile Eukaryotic Chromosomes in Fungal Pathogens	Dr. Michael Habig	2026–2030
Consolidator	ESTER	ESTimation of the prehistoric population of Eurasia based on a large number of Records	Dr. Martin Hinz	2025–2030
Consolidator	UltraSpecT	Phase-Locked Photon-Electron Interactions for Ultrafast Spectroscopy beyond T2	Prof. Nahid Talebi	2025–2030
Consolidator	WildfireTwins	Digital Forest Twins for AI-based Wildfire Assessment	Prof. Sören Pirk	2025–2030
Starting	SYNNEURON	Bottom-up assembly of synthetic neural networks from biological matter	Prof. Jan Steinkühler	2025–2030
Advanced	FRAGILE IMAGES	The Fragility, Instability, Ambiguity, and Self-Reflexivity of Images in Roman Art	Prof. Annette Haug	2025–2029
Proof of Concept	DEGRON	Tailored technologies for the development of next-generation PROTAC molecules (DEGRON)	Prof. Elmar Wolf	2025–2027
Consolidator	VESICULOME	Origin, evolution and function of bacterial extracellular vesicles in the human host-gut microbiome system	Prof. Mathieu Groussin	2024–2029
Proof of Concept	UltraCoherentCL	Ultrafast Cathodoluminescence Spectroscopy with Coherent Electron-Driven Photon Sources	Prof. Nahid Talebi	2024–2025
Consolidator	CarboCell	Vesicular mechanisms of carbon fixation in calcifying cells of marine animals	Dr. Marian Hu	2023–2028
Consolidator	FungalSecrets	The role of plant microbiota in the evolution of fungal pathogens and their repertoires of secreted proteins	Prof. Eva Holtgrewe-Stukenbrock	2023–2028
Consolidator	pMolEvol	Molecular and Genome Evolution of Prokaryotic Plasmids	Prof. Dr. Tal Dagan	2023–2028
Consolidator	PROTAC-PDAC	Targeted Protein Degradation as a New Experimental and Therapeutic Approach for Pancreatic Ductal Adenocarcinoma	Prof. Elmar Wolf	2023–2028
Starting	MicroT	Microbiota-T cell interactions – antigen-specificity and regulation in health and disease	Prof. Petra Bacher	2022–2027
Advanced	MADMICS	Metaplasia as an adaptive response to chronic microbial infections	Prof. Thomas F. Meyer	2021–2026
Synergy	XSCAPE	Material Minds: Exploring the Interactions between Predictive Brains, Cultural Artifacts, and Embodied Visual Search	Prof. Johannes Müller	2021–2027
Starting	DULICAT	Dual Ligand-Enabled Palladium Catalysis: Unlocking Novel Reactivities and Selectivities in Aromatic C–H Activation	Prof. Manuel van Gemmeren	2021–2026

=== Job fair ===
For job-seeking graduates and researchers, Kiel University and Kiel University of Applied Sciences jointly organise talent transfair, which takes place twice a year, alternating between the Auditorium Maximum and a tent on the forecourt of the Audimax or on the campus of Kiel University of Applied Sciences, and promotes exchange and mutual acquaintance between potential employers and employees.

== Research ==
=== Research Areas ===
Research areas at Kiel University include life sciences, marine sciences, nanoscience and social sciences. The university's central fields of research include marine and geosciences, medical and life sciences, evolutionary biology and nanoscience. Several of these fields are organised in interdisciplinary research networks. A particular priority is placed on research into chronic inflammatory diseases. This research is conducted, among other contexts, within the Cluster of Excellence Precision Medicine in Chronic Inflammation.

Smaller fields of research include agricultural and nutritional sciences. Research in this area includes issues relating to food safety and quality assurance in food production. In this context, the QUASI research network was established in the early 2000s.

=== Strategy for Excellence ===
As part of the German Universities Excellence Initiative of the German federal and state governments, the Cluster of Excellence The Future Ocean was approved in October 2006. In October 2007, a further Cluster of Excellence, Inflammation at Interfaces, and the Graduate School Human Development in Landscapes followed. With this funding, the university was among the most successful higher education institutions in the first round of the Excellence Initiative after the nine so-called universities of excellence.

Since 2018, the clusters Precision Medicine in Chronic Inflammation (PMI) and ROOTS – Social, Environmental, and Cultural Connectivity in Past Societies have been funded under the Excellence Strategy of the German federal and state governments. Funding for both clusters was extended in 2025 until 2032.

The cluster Precision Medicine in Chronic Inflammation (PMI) deals with the causes, diagnosis and treatment options of chronic inflammatory diseases. The conditions studied include Crohn's disease, psoriasis and diabetes. In addition to CAU, the University of Lübeck, the University Medical Center Schleswig Holstein and other research institutions are involved in the cluster. The Cluster of Excellence ROOTS examines social, cultural and economic interconnections in past societies and their significance for present-day developments. Its research is based particularly in archaeology and related historical disciplines.

With the renewed approval of the clusters, the university again has the opportunity to apply for the status of a University of Excellence. In June 2025, the university senate unanimously decided to submit such an application. At the end of 2025, the university subsequently submitted its application to the German Council of Science and Humanities for funding as a University of Excellence. A decision on the designation of new Universities of Excellence is expected between September and October 2026. If the application is approved, the university could receive additional funding of up to 15 million euros per year until 2033.

=== Partnerships and alliances (selection) ===
The university participates in regional, national and international research networks. Since 1994, it has been involved in the North German University Network for the improvement of teaching and research. It is also one of the initiators of the Allianz für Spitzenforschung.SH, an association of different universities and research institutions in Schleswig-Holstein founded in 2020.

In the field of marine and geosciences, the university cooperates, among others, with the GEOMAR Helmholtz Centre for Ocean Research Kiel. Their joint research includes changes in the oceans, the effects of climate change on marine ecosystems and issues relating to the sustainable use of marine resources.

In the field of evolutionary biology, the university participates in the International Max Planck Research School (IMPRS) for Evolutionary Biology, which is operated jointly with the Max Planck Institute for Evolutionary Biology in Plön and the GEOMAR Helmholtz Centre for Ocean Research Kiel.

The research priority in nanoscience and surface research is organised in the Kiel Nano Surface and Interface Science (KiNSIS) research network. In this network, researchers at the university work with partners from non-university institutions such as the Fraunhofer Institute for Silicon Technology and the Helmholtz Centre.

In the field of materials science, the university cooperates with the University of Minnesota as part of a project on ceramic shape-memory materials funded by the German Research Foundation.

In medicine, there is cooperation with the Institute of Science Tokyo, based on an agreement concluded in 2023 with the former Tokyo Medical and Dental University and expanded in 2024. The cooperation includes in particular the exchange of researchers and joint activities in inflammation medicine. In medical research, the university also cooperates, together with the University Medical Center Schleswig Holstein, with the University of California, San Francisco in the KI-Exchange project in the field of artificial intelligence.

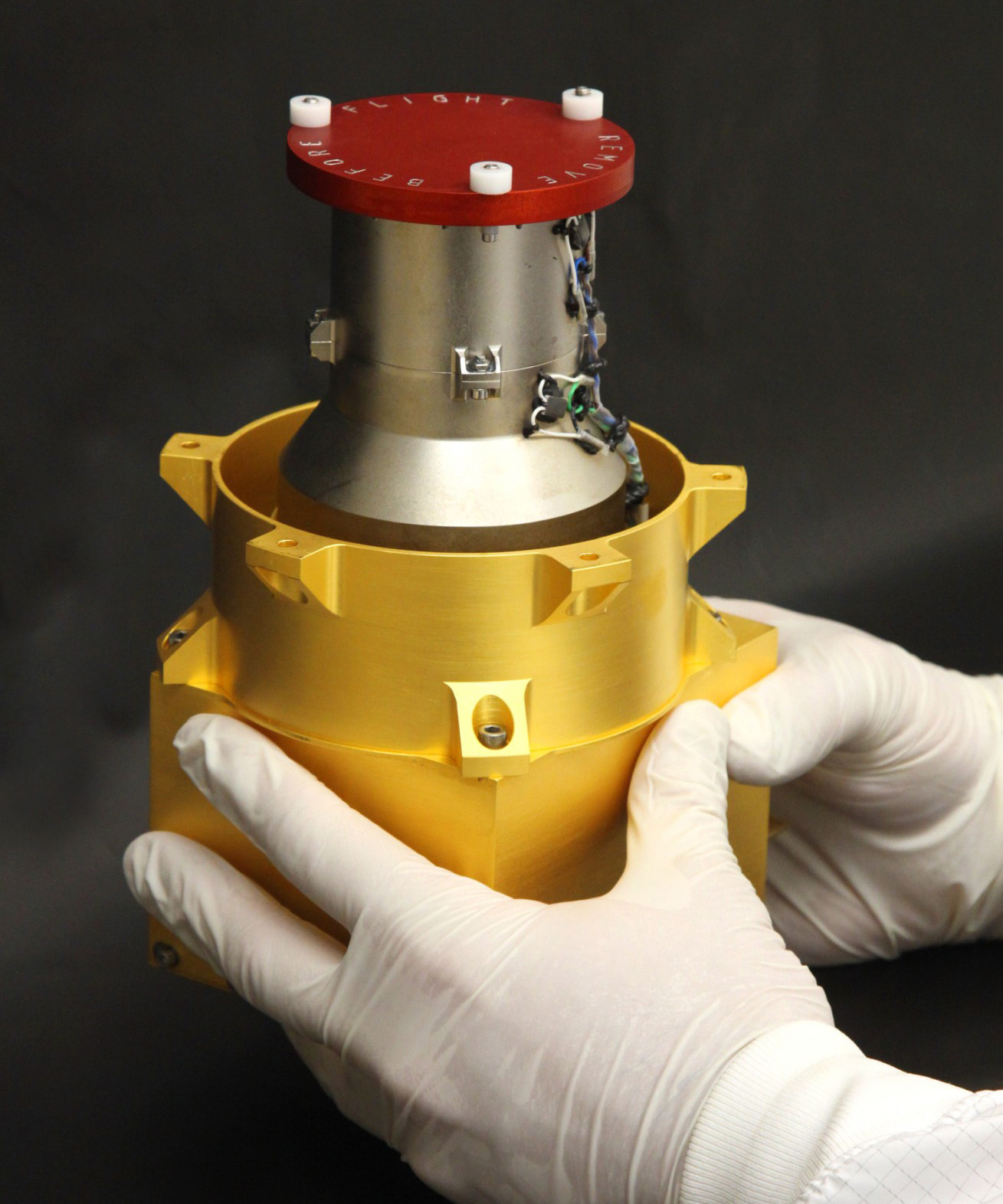
Kiel University helped develop this radiation detector for a Mars probe.

== Notable people ==
=== University lecturers in Kiel ===
The holders of chairs at Kiel University included the physiologist Hans Friedrich Meves (1925–2008) from 1967 to 1970, the human geneticist Werner Grote (1938–2025) from 1975, and the chemist and nutrition scientist Walter Feldheim (1926–2016) from 1976.

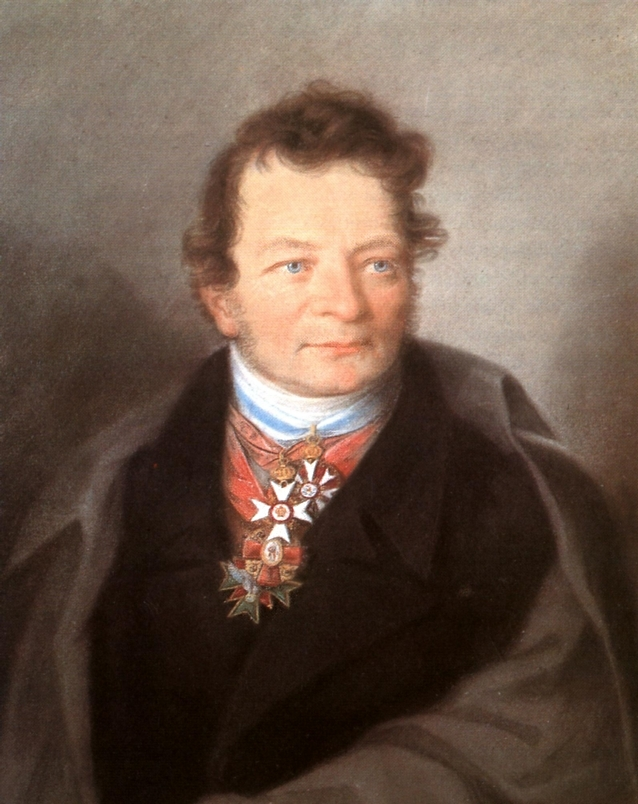
Anselm von Feuerbach, 1802–1804

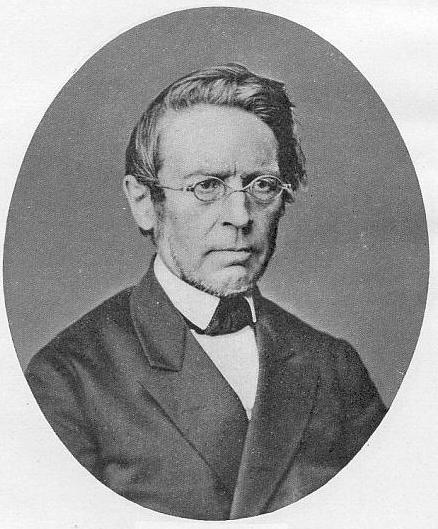
Johann Gustav Droysen, 1840–1851

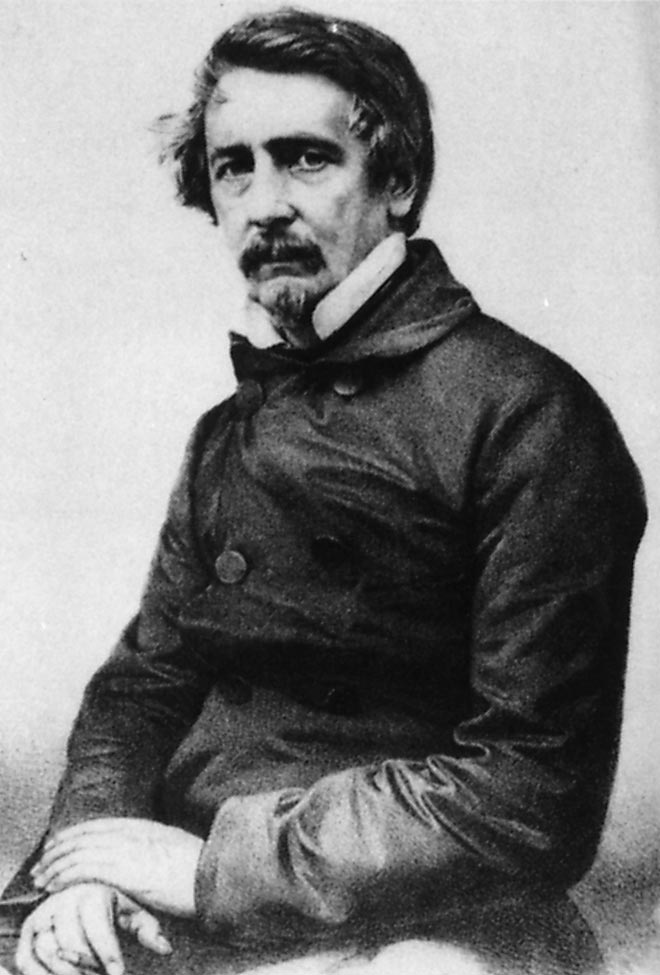
Louis Stromeyer, from 1848

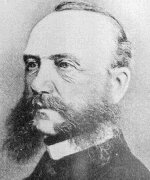
Wilhelm Griesinger, director of Kiel University Hospital from 1849

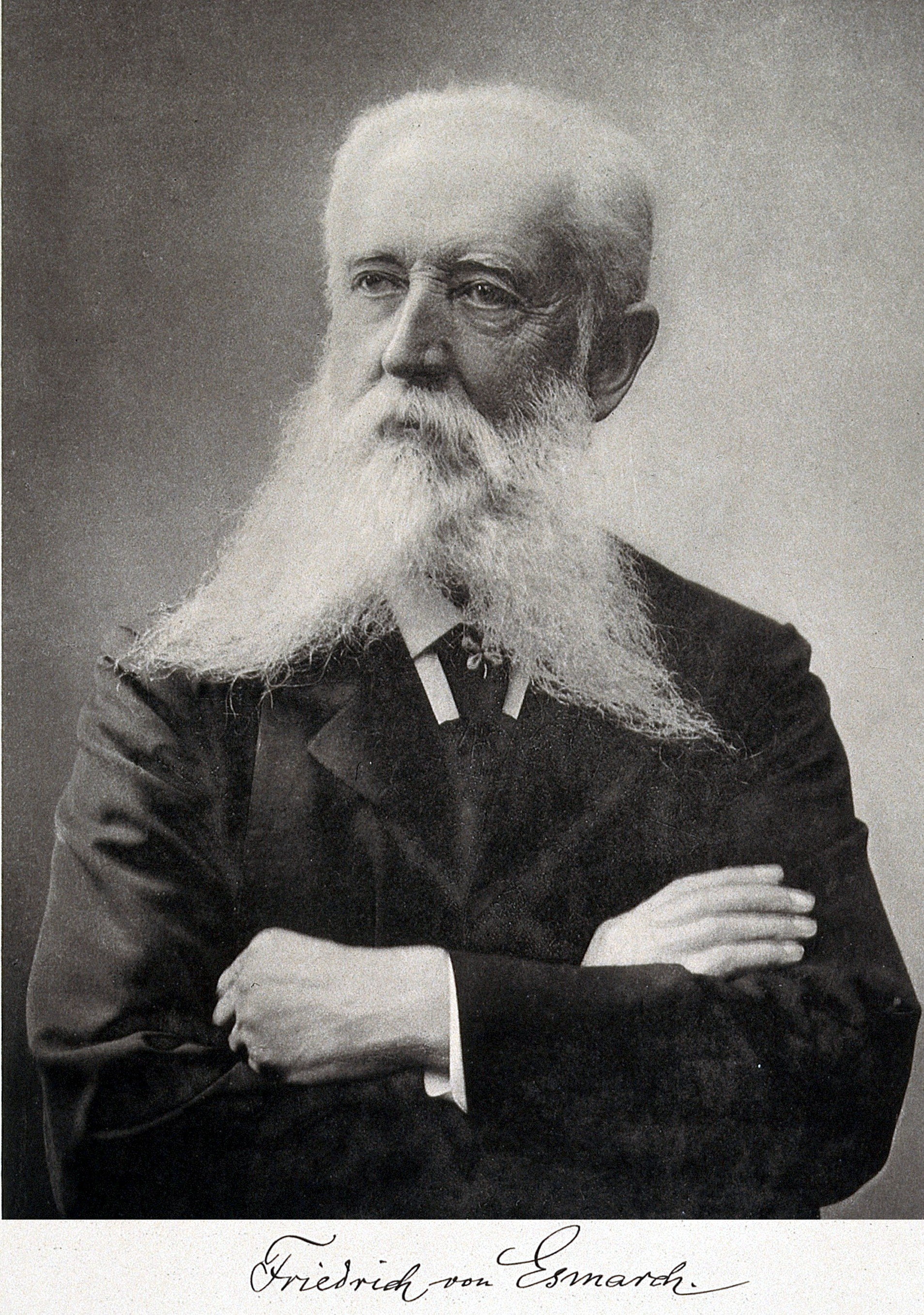
Friedrich von Esmarch, 1854–1898

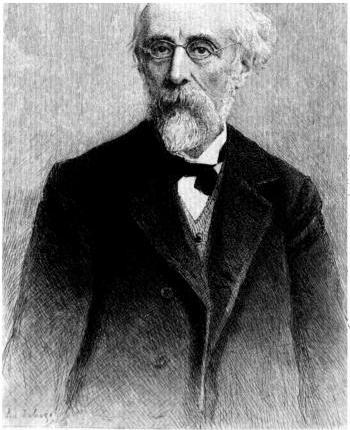
Theodor Nöldeke, 1864–1872

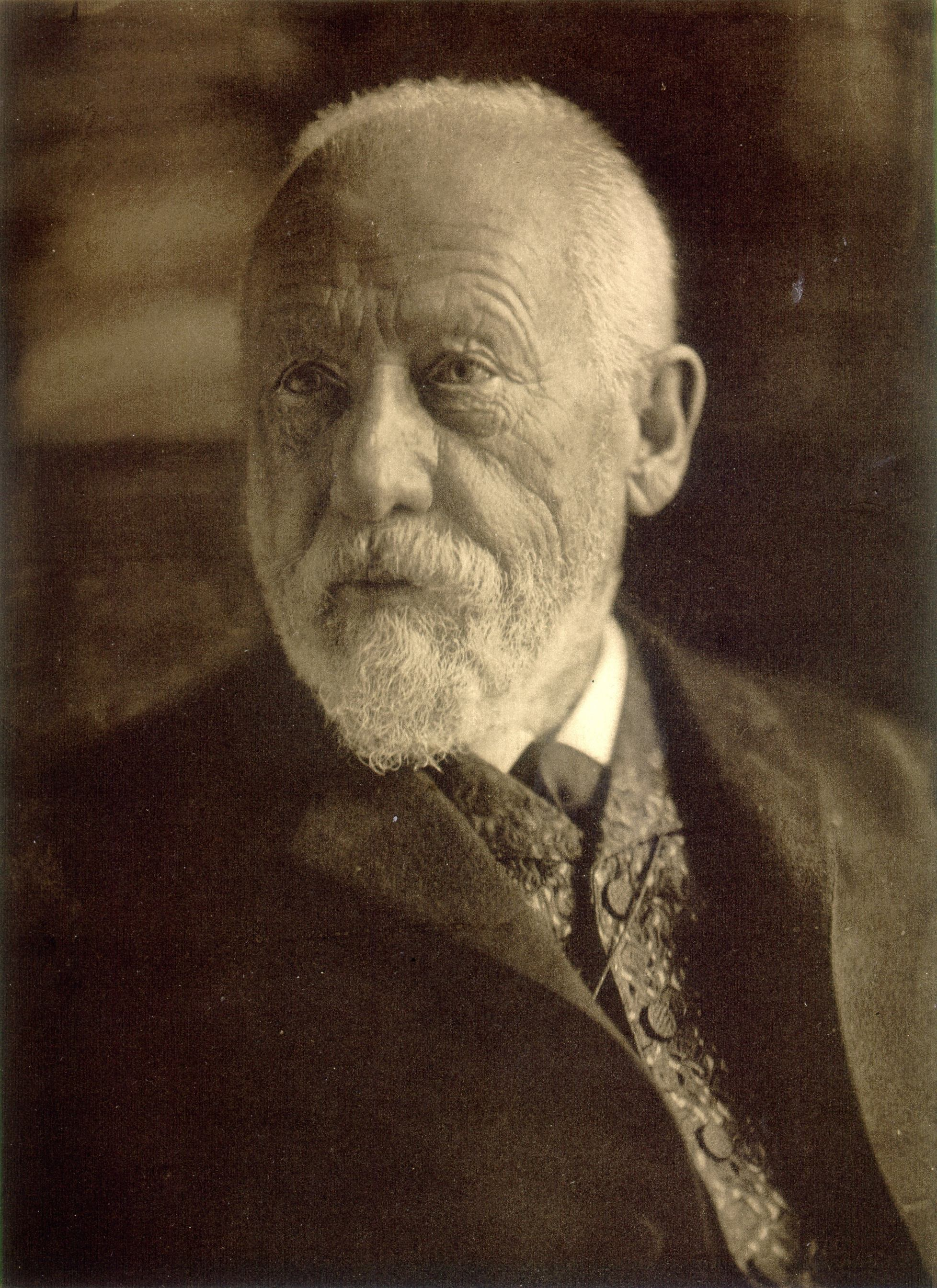
Wilhelm Dilthey, 1868–1871

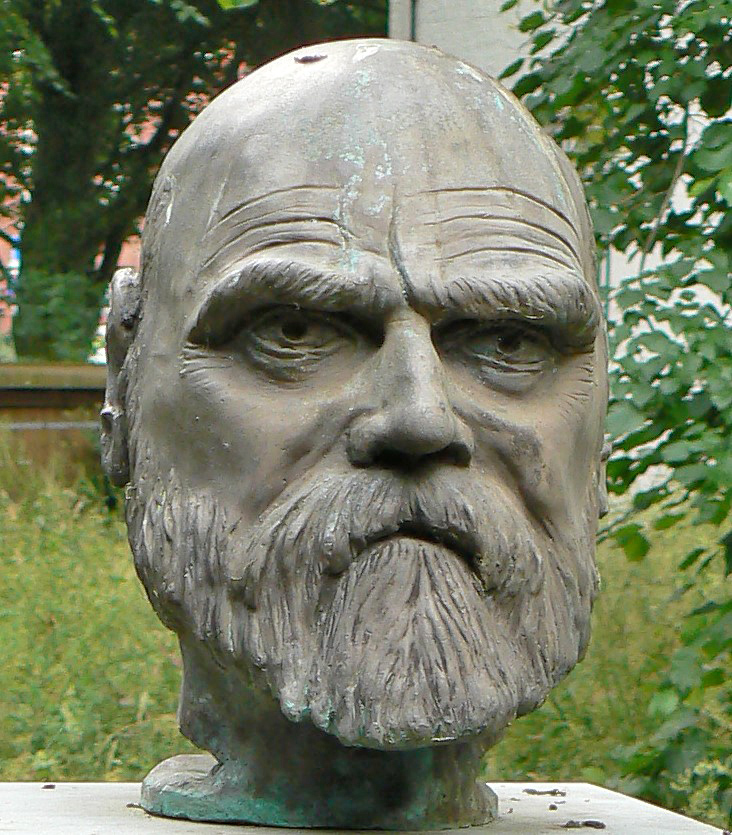
Ferdinand Tönnies, 1881–1933

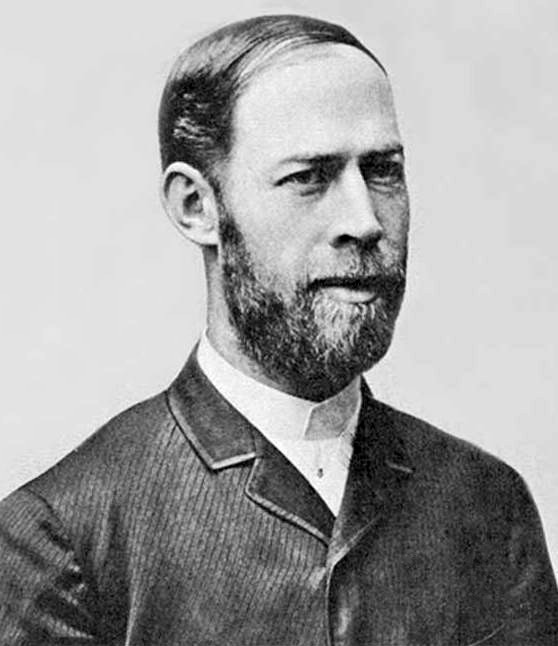
Heinrich Hertz, 1883–1885

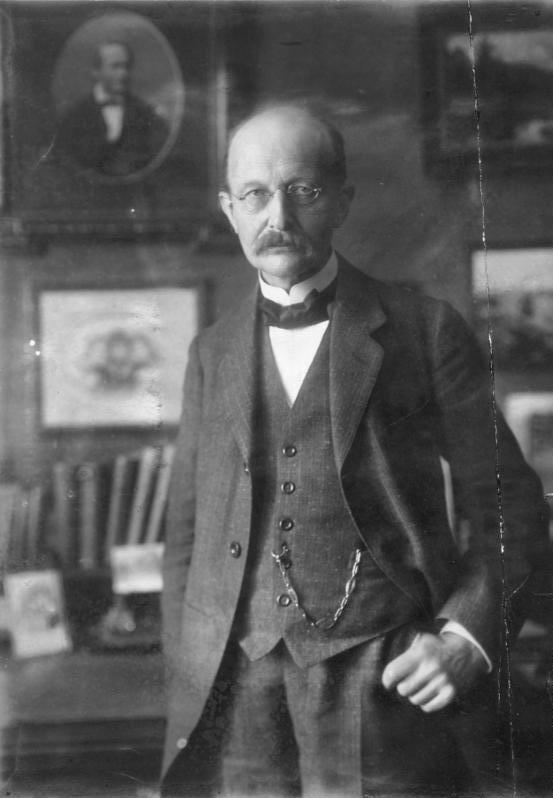
Max Planck, 1885–1889

=== Alumni ===
See also Category:Kiel University alumni

- Franz Boas (1858–1942), anthropologist
- Alice Bota (born 1979), journalist
- Georg von Dadelsen (1918–2007), musicologist, Neue Bach-Ausgabe
- Matthias von Davier, psychometrician, academic, inventor, and author
- Gerhard Domagk, bacteriologist, Nobel laureate
- Andre Franke, geneticist
- Maren Gaulke (born 1955), herpetologist
- Johanna Hellman (1889–1982), surgeon
- Mareile Höppner, television presenter
- Doris König, current judge of the Federal Constitutional Court of Germany
- Wolfgang Kubicki, politician, vice chairman of the FDP in Germany, from 1992 to 1993 and since 1996 he is faction leader of the FDP in the Landtag, the parliament of Schleswig-Holstein, member of the Bundestag
- Oswald Pohl (1892–1951), Nazi SS officer executed for war crimes
- Viktoria Schmidt-Linsenhoff (1944–2013), German art historian and professor
- Dagmar Karin Sørbøe (born 1945), Norwegian physiotherapist and women's rights activist
- Gerhard Stoltenberg, politician, former prime minister of Schleswig-Holstein, former finance minister of Germany
- Peer Steinbrück, politician, former prime minister of North Rhine Westphalia, former finance minister of Germany
- Christian Thierfelder, cropping systems agronomist and researcher
- Erich Walter Sternberg, composer
- Sibylle Kessal-Wulf, former judge of the Federal Constitutional Court of Germany, Germany's highest court
- Surya Hermawan, lecturer at Petra Christian University, Indonesia

=== Academics ===
- Walter Anderson
- Robert Alexy
- Jochen Bleicken
- Klaus Fuchs
- Hartmut Boockmann
- Friedrich Blume
- Hans Gerhard Creutzfeldt
- Paul Deussen
- Wilhelm Dilthey
- Johann Gustav Droysen
- Jakob Christoph Rudolf Eckermann
- Karl-Dietrich Erdmann
- Friedrich von Esmarch
- Johan Christian Fabricius
- Paul Johann Anselm Ritter von Feuerbach
- Hans Geiger
- Herbert Giersch
- Wilhelm Griesinger
- Bernhard Harms
- Heinrich Hertz
- Alfred Heuß
- Felix Jacoby
- Otto Jahn
- Hans Langmaack
- Mojib Latif
- August Leskien
- Daniel Georg Morhof
- Theodor Mommsen
- Daniel Pauly
- Max Planck
- Erwin Rohde
- Erich Schneider
- Albert Hänel
- Walther Schücking
- Fritz Stein
- Ferdinand Tönnies
- Heinrich von Treitschke
- Friedrich Wegener
- Otto Werner
- Gustav Radbruch
- Richard Sorge
- Philip Rosenstiel

==== Nobel Prize winners ====
Laureate	born	deceased	CAU period	CAU function	Nobel Prize
Theodor Mommsen	1817 Garding	1903 Charlottenburg	1838–1844	Law student, Dr. jur.	Literature, 1902
Philipp Lenard	1862 Bratislava	1947 Messelhausen	1898–1907	Ordinarius, Physics	Physics, 1905
Eduard Buchner	1860 Munich	1917 Focsani	1893–1896	Privatdozent, Biochemistry	Chemistry, 1907
Max Planck	1858 Kiel	1947 Göttingen	1885–1889	associate professor, theoretical physics	Physics, 1918
Otto Meyerhof	1884 Hannover	1951 Philadelphia	1912–1924	Postdoc, a.o. Prof., Physiology	Medicine 1/2, 1922
Gerhard Domagk	1895 Lagow	1964 Burgberg	1914–1921	Study of medicine with degree in Kiel	Medicine, 1939
Walter Rudolf Hess	1881 Frauenfeld, CH	1973 Muralto, CH		Student of Medicine	Medicine, 1949
Otto Diels	1876 Hamburg	1954 Kiel	1916–1945	Ordinarius, Organic Chemistry	Chemistry 1/2, 1950
Kurt Alder	1902 Königshütte	1958 Cologne	1924–1936	Associate Professor, Organic Chemistry	Chemistry 1/2, 1950
Wassily Leontief	1905 Munich	1999 New York, USA	1927–1928	Scientific Assistant, Economics	Economics, 1973
Wolfgang Paul	1913 Lorenzkirch	1993 Bonn	1937–1942	Scientific Assistant, Physics	Physics 1/3, 1989
Günter Blobel	1936 Waltersdorf	2018 New York, USA		Student of Medicine	Medicine, 1999

== Rankings ==
University rankings

Overall – Global & National
QS World 2024	530	33
THE World 2024	301–350	32–33
ARWU World 2023	201–300	10–19

Kiel University is recognized in several university ranking systems. According to the 2024 QS World University Rankings, the institution is globally positioned at 530 and holds the 33rd place nationally. In the 2024 THE World University Rankings, it is placed within the 301–350 bracket worldwide and ranks between 32nd and 33rd nationally. The ARWU World Rankings for 2023 presents the university within the global 201–300 range, while its national rank is within the 10th to 19th positions.

== Academic publishing ==
- The Ethnographisch-Archaeologische Zeitschrift (EAZ) is an interdisciplinary journal dedicated to the study of human societies from prehistory to the present day by bridging archaeology, anthropology, and philosophy and addressing topics like social inequality, climate change, and indigenous sovereignty. The EAZ was founded in 1960 as the successor to the publication series Ethnographisch-Archäologische Forschungen, which was published from 1953 to 1959. First published at Humboldt University Berlin in 1960, the EAZ later moved to Leipzig in 2010, and since 2023 it is published at Kiel University.

== Holstein Study Award ==
CAU's most renowned award is the Holstein Study Award (Holsteiner Studienpreis), which is awarded to the university's top three students each year since 2001. The award's criteria include extraordinary academic achievements, a broad intellectual horizon and political or social involvement. It is endowed with a prize money of €500 for the 2nd and 3rd prize and €1000 for the 1st prize. The Holstein Study Award is funded by the association 'Iuventus Academiae Holsatorum'. The award's expert jury includes professors of various faculties and the prizes are awarded by the university's president or vice-president in a formal ceremony in the top floor of the skyscraper on campus.

== Points of interest ==
- Botanischer Garten der Christian-Albrechts-Universität zu Kiel, the university's botanical garden

=== Gallery ===
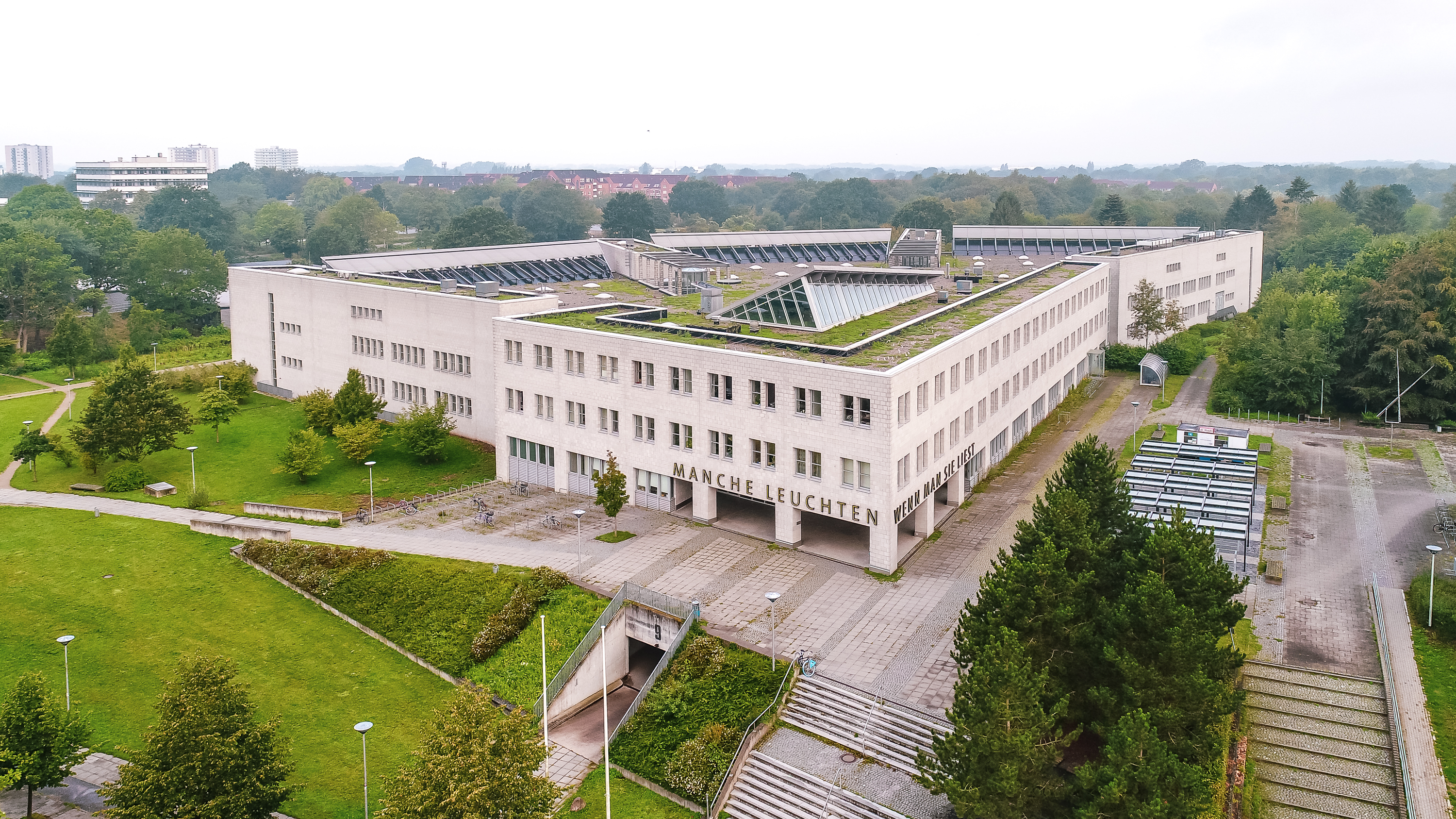
"Some shine when you read them" - Aerial photograph of the University Library of the CAU on Leibniz Street

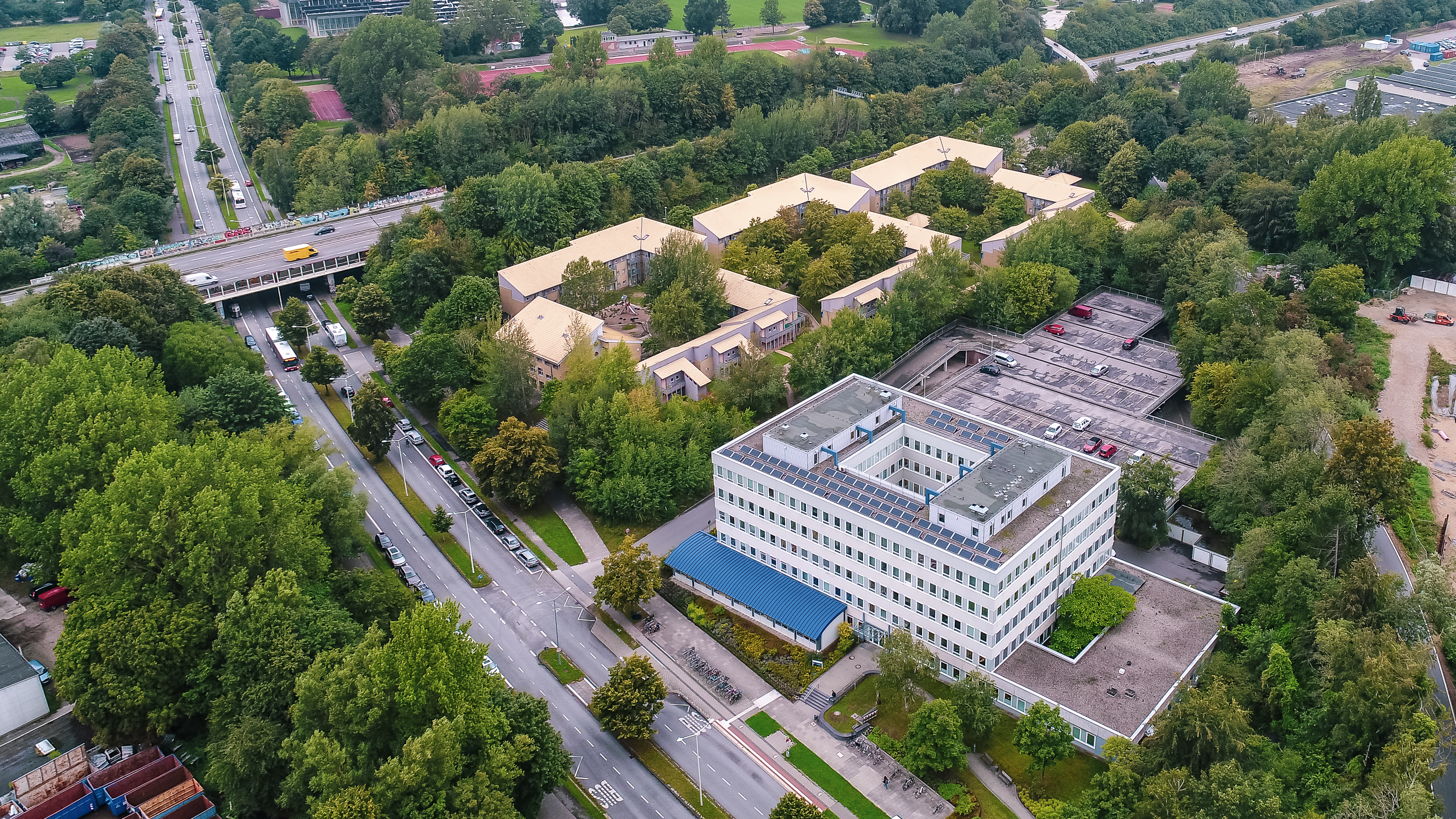
The Leibniz Institute for the Education in Natural Sciences and Mathematics at Olshausenstraße

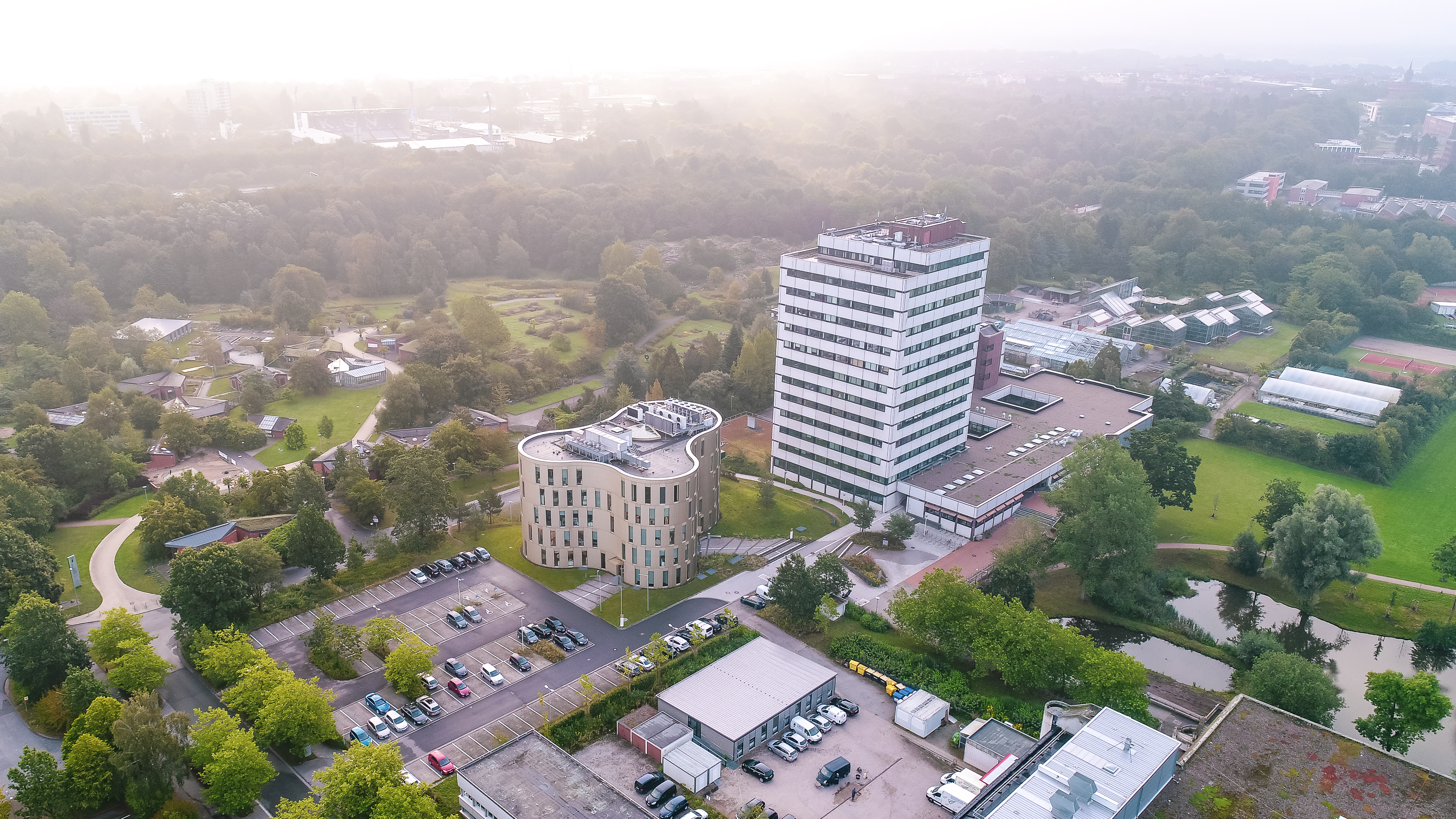
The Centre for Biochemistry and Molecular Biology (ZMB) of the CAU at the Botanical Garden

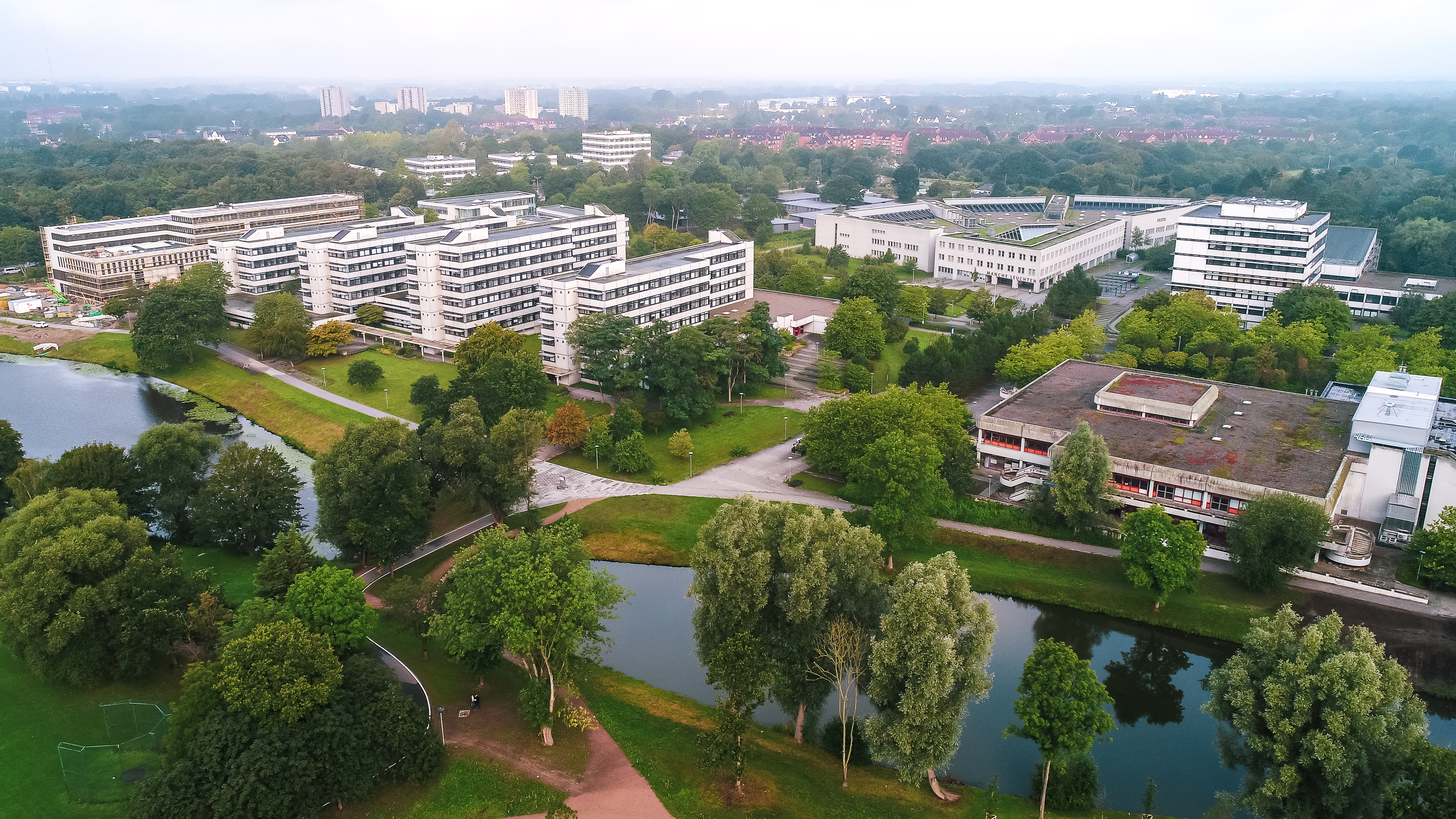
Leibniz-Straße-based institutes, the cafeteria and the university library

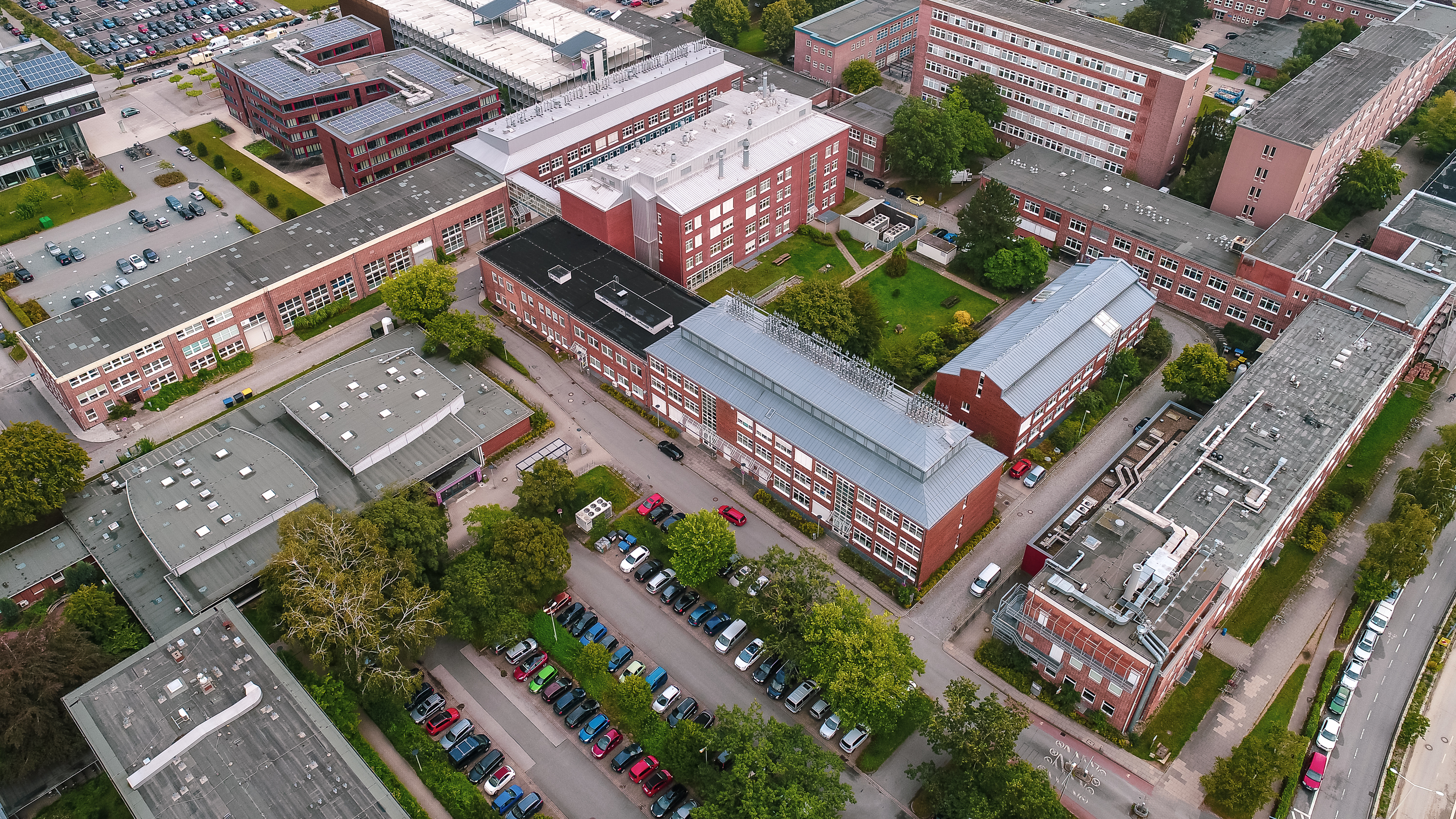
The Otto-Hahn-Platz and the Max-Eyth-Straße with the various chemical institutes and the Anatomical Institute

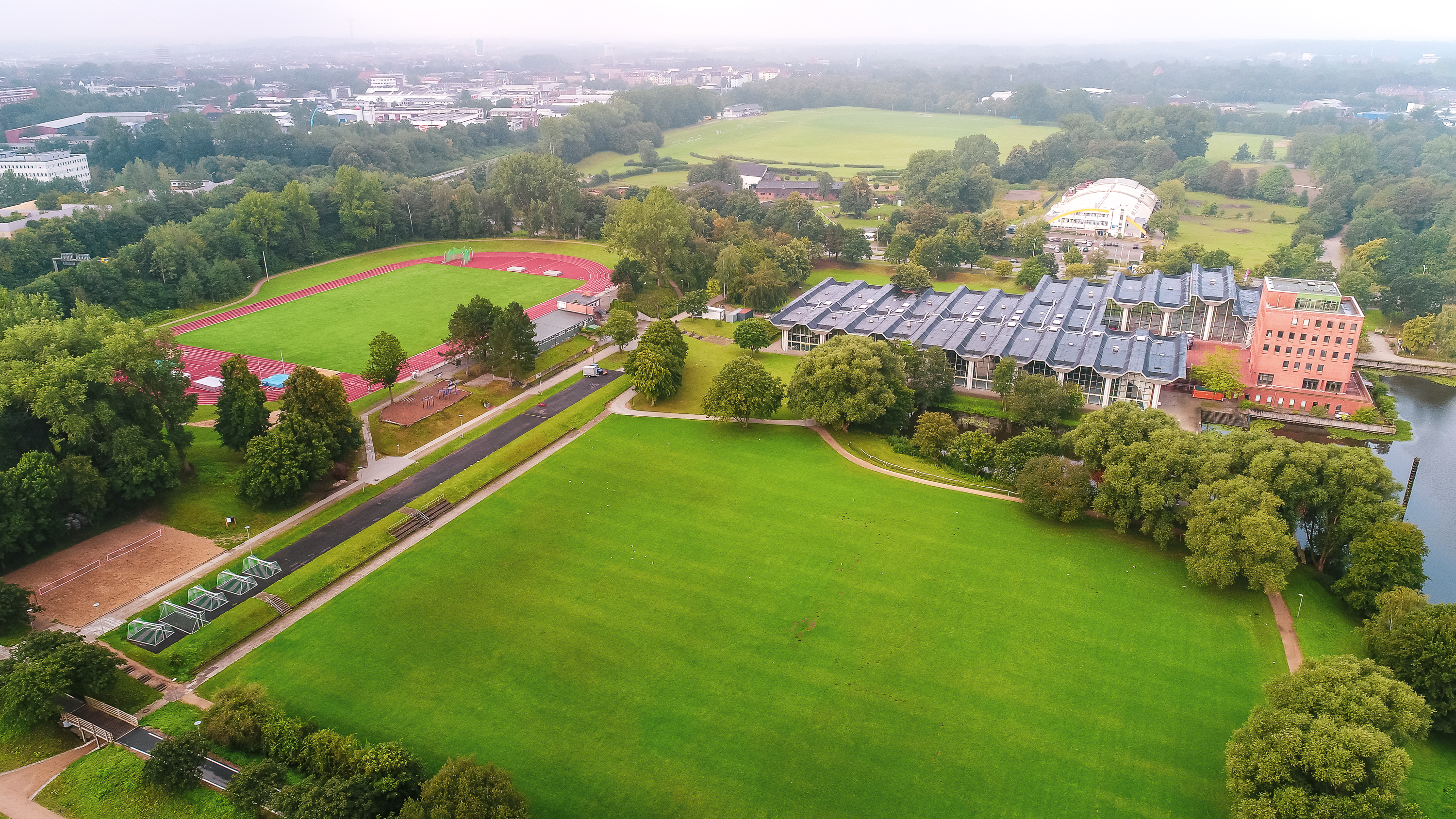
The sports facilities and the Institute of Sports Science of the CAU

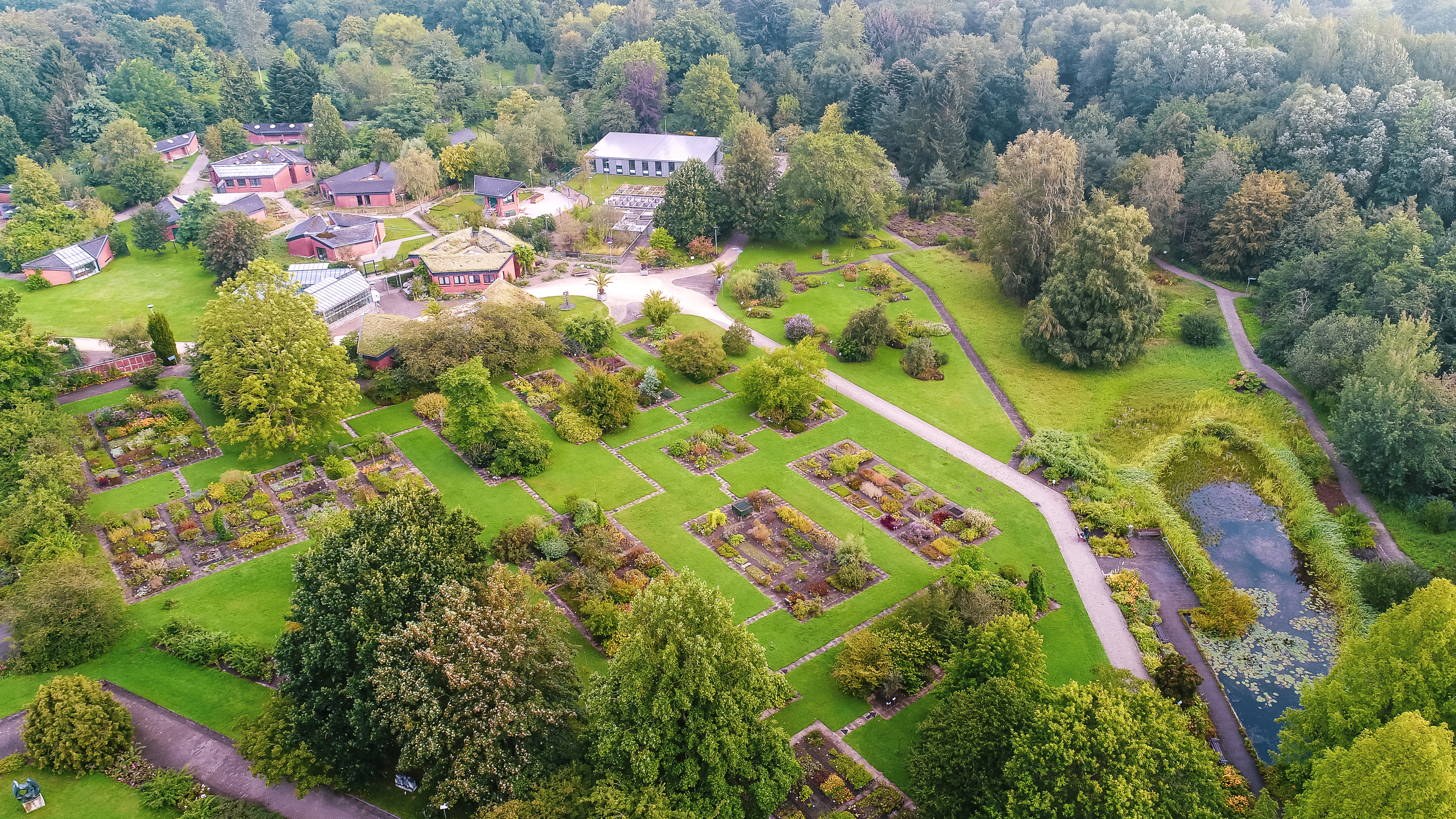
The grounds of the botanical garden of the CAU Kiel

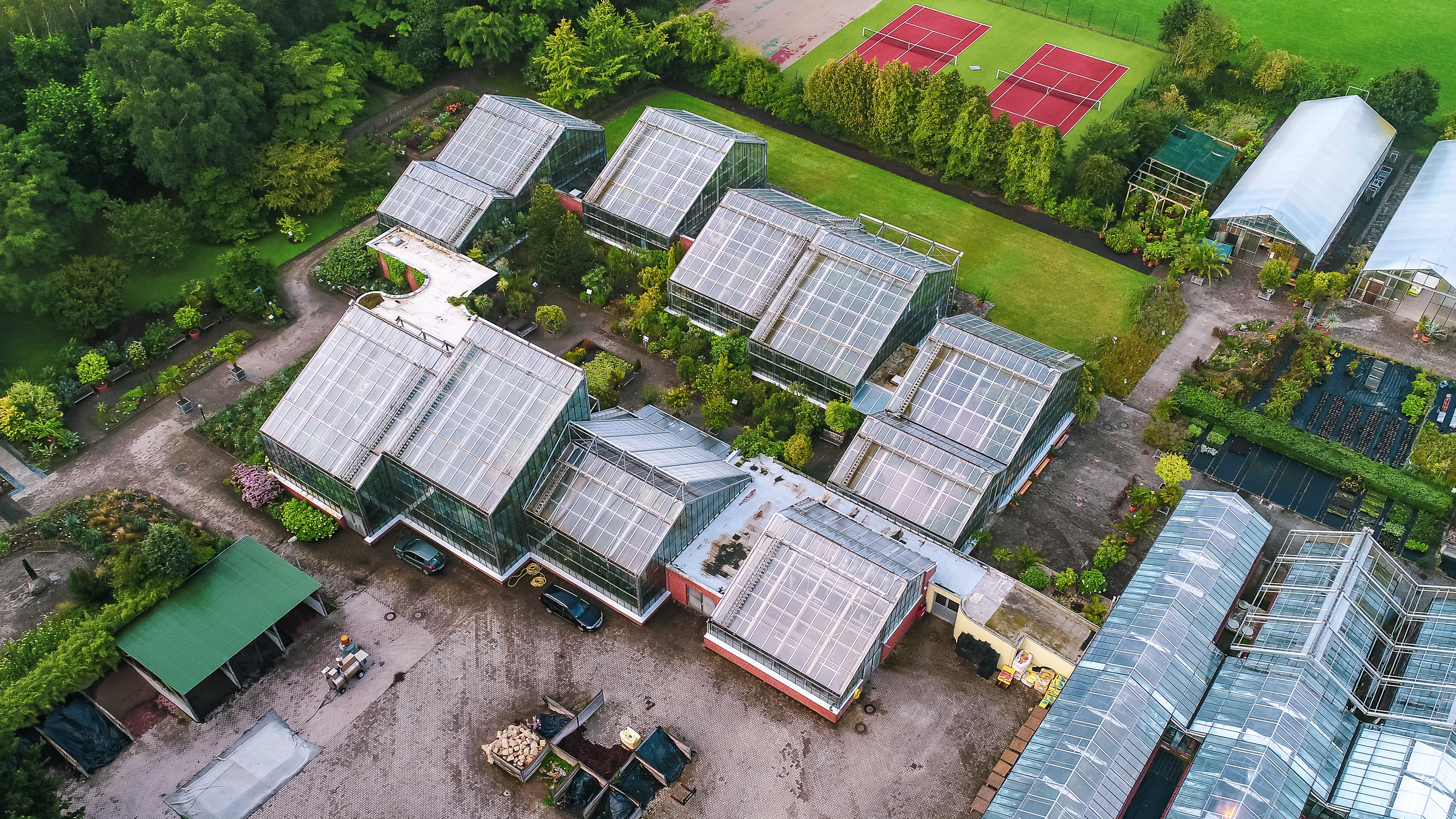
The greenhouses of the Botanical Garden of the CAU

== See also ==
- List of early modern universities in Europe
- Lists of universities and colleges
