= Philip Rosenstiel =

German medical doctor

- Occupations: Medical doctor, academic, and full university professor

Academic background
- Education: Doctor of Medicine
- Alma mater: Kiel University; Tufts University

Academic work
- Institutions: Kiel University

Philip Rosenstiel is a German medical doctor and an academic. He is director of the Institute of Clinical Molecular Biology and a professor of clinical molecular biology at Kiel University.

Rosenstiel is most known for his work on the pathophysiology of chronic inflammatory diseases, primarily focusing on developing innovative biomarkers and new therapeutic approaches. His work has been published in academic journals including Nature, Nature Genetics, Cell Metabolism and Immunity.

== Education ==
Rosenstiel obtained a degree in medicine in 2001 from Kiel University. During this time, he also went for training to Tufts University in Boston as part of a scholarship from the BMEP and the Studienstiftung.

== Career ==
Rosenstiel's academic career began as a BMEP research fellow at the Jackson Laboratory from 1997 to 1998. He subsequently held the position of postdoctoral fellow at the Max Planck Institute for Molecular Genetics between 2005 and 2007. He served as a professor of Molecular and Marine Medicine at Kiel University from 2007 to 2012. Following this, he was appointed as a professor of molecular medicine between 2012 and 2016. Since 2012, he has been the director of the Institute of Clinical Molecular Biology, and since 2016 a professor of clinical molecular biology at Kiel University.

Rosenstiel has been a member of the steering board of the International Human Epigenome Consortium since 2017 and is spokesperson of the Precision Health in Schleswig-Holstein, a governance body to foster clinical translational research in Schleswig-Holstein. Since 2022, he has been serving as vice-dean for research at the Medical Faculty in Kiel.

== Research ==
Rosenstiel has employed methods from systems immunology and utilized genomic techniques such as single-cell analysis to create novel biomarkers and explore innovative therapeutic strategies. He contributed to the pilot phase of the 1000 Genomes Project, participated in the German International Cancer Genome Consortium (ICGC) on malignant lymphoma and led the large European Horizon 2020 Project on Systems Medicine in Chronic Inflammation (SYSCID). He has authored publications with a specific focus on the pathophysiology of chronic inflammatory diseases, including articles in peer-reviewed journals. He has authored over 450 scientific publications until end of 2023 with a specific focus on chronic inflammatory diseases. In December 2023 he had an h-index over 113 and his articles received over 76908 citations.

=== Pathophysiology of chronic inflammatory diseases ===
Rosenstiel's work on mechanisms of chronic inflammatory diseases, particularly human chronic inflammatory bowel diseases (IBD), investigates the role of the intestinal epithelium for the crosstalk between the microbiota and mucosal immune responses. A particular focus has been on the role of autophagy and ER stress as basic principles of epithelial differentiation and Paneth cell function. His showed a link between the defective removal of RNA nucleotides during proliferation of intestinal epithelial cells, mucosal inflammation and colorectal cancer formation. With Josef Penninger and others, he demonstrated that a lack of the ACE2 enzyme, responsible for controlling the renin-angiotensin system, disrupts the balance of the amino acid tryptophan in the intestinal epithelium. This in turn leads to impaired antimicrobial peptide production in the gut, leading to increased susceptibility to colitis and intestinal inflammation. He has contributed to early clinical therapy developments, e.g. IL-6 transsignalling inhibition in IBD (olamkicept phase II trial) or sterile-filtered fecal material transfer for C. difficile infection.

=== Molecular profiling and biomarkers of disease ===
Rosenstiel's work has also focused on biomarker development in chronic inflammatory diseases and cancer. Here, he mostly employed multi-omics techniques, e.g. transcriptomics and methylomics and microbiome analysis to develop predictions for individual trajectories of disease and to stratify patients for different targeted therapies. During the COVID-19 pandemic, he was founding member of the DeCOI consortium and led analyses, which identified megakaryocyte expression signatures as a marker for fatal disease course.

== Awards and honors ==
- 2001 – Recipient of the Graduate stipend of the Novartis Stiftung für therapeutische Forschung
- 2003 – Hensel-Research Prize, Kiel University
- 2017 – Schleswig-Holstein Excellence Chair

== Selected articles ==
- Hampe, J., Franke, A., Rosenstiel, P., Till, A., Teuber, M., Huse, K., ... & Schreiber, S. (2007). A genome-wide association scan of nonsynonymous SNPs identifies a susceptibility variant for Crohn disease in ATG16L1. Nature genetics, 39(2), 207–211.
- Hashimoto, T., Perlot, T., Rehman, A., Trichereau, J., Ishiguro, H., Paolino, M., ... & Penninger, J. M. (2012). ACE2 links amino acid malnutrition to microbial ecology and intestinal inflammation. Nature, 487(7408), 477–481.
- Aden, K., Tran, F., Ito, G. O., Sheibani-Tezerji, R., Lipinski, S., Kuiper, J. W., ... & Rosenstiel, P. (2018). ATG16L1 orchestrates interleukin-22 signaling in the intestinal epithelium via cGAS–STING. Journal of Experimental Medicine, 215(11), 2868–2886.
- Bernardes, J. P., Mishra, N., Tran, F., Bahmer, T., Best, L., Blase, J. I., ... & Rosenstiel, P. (2020). Longitudinal multi-omics analyses identify responses of megakaryocytes, erythroid cells, and plasmablasts as hallmarks of severe COVID-19. Immunity, 53(6), 1296–1314.
- Fazio, A., Bordoni, D., Kuiper, J. W., Weber-Stiehl, S., Stengel, S. T., Arnold, P., ... & Rosenstiel, P. (2022). DNA methyltransferase 3A controls intestinal epithelial barrier function and regeneration in the colon. Nature Communications, 13(1), 6266.
