= Johanna Hellman =

German and Swedish surgeon (1889-1982)

- Born: 14 June 1889; Nuremberg, German Empire
- Died: 1982; Stockholm
- Education: University of Berlin; University of Kiel (M.D.)
- Scientific career
- Fields: Surgery
- Workplaces: Kiel University Hospital; Salvation Army Hospital; Surgical Hospital of Eskilstuna

Johanna Hellman (c. 14 June 1889 – 1982) was a female German and Swedish surgeon. She was the first female to be a member of the German Society for Surgery and contributed to surgical advancements in Germany and Sweden.

== Education and career ==
Johanna Hellman was born in Nuremberg, German Empire on 14 June 1889. In 1912 she attended medical school at the University of Berlin where she was trained under the German physician Hans Virchow. Hellman later returned to medical school at the University of Kiel, where she received specialized training to become a surgeon. After the start of World War I that year, she worked in the University of Kiel Hospital, completing her final licensing exam and wrote her doctoral thesis. She remained in Kiel during the war and assisted with the care of injured soldiers. In 1912, she joined the Northwest German Surgical Society and began filling in for surgeons at various municipal hospitals. Hellman became the first female member of the German Society for Surgery in 1925. From 1929 to 1938 she worked as a surgeon, radiologist, and urologist at the Charité clinic in Berlin. At this time, she became assistant to Ferdinand Sauerbruch, the head of surgery at the university clinic. Hellman also became director of a Salvation Army hospital during this time period, introducing a surgical division to the maternity ward of a Salvation Army hospital. She was forced to resign from her roles as head doctor in 1938 due to Nazi discrimination laws. Hellman emigrated to Stockholm, Sweden, but could not work as a surgeon because of her refugee status. She was able to work as a nanny and spent her time learning Swedish. In 1944, she became an assistant in the Surgical Hospital of Eskilstuna and was authorized to form a private practice three years later. In 1947, Hellman managed her private practice at the Red Cross Hospital, working as an abdominal surgeon. Hellman and Dr. Willy Anschütz conducted research and published papers regarding radiation as a treatment of breast cancer. On or around this time in Hellman's life, it has been documented that she was in correspondence with Lisa Meitner as well. She was still working at age 86, but little is known of her subsequent life. Hellman died in 1982 in Stockholm.

== Family ==
Johanna Hellman was sister to Sophie Hellman (c. 1894–1979) who was also involved in German Healthcare as a nurse in World War I. Her father was David Hellman, a merchant, and her mother was Fanny née Kromwell of the Kromwell family of Gunzenhausen. Johanna Hellman was a mother to Irmgard Ahrendt, who she adopted during her time as a physician in Kiel during World War I. The young girls father was injured in the war, however, soon after his recovery he won back custody of his child. In 1938, during her time as a nanny, Hellman adopted another child. She cared for one family's fourth child full-time and eventually adopted the little girl. The adoption did not become official until 1966.
