= Christian Thierfelder =

Agronomist

- Occupations: Principal cropping systems agronomist and academic

Academic background
- Education: M.S., Agriculture; Ph.D., Agriculture
- Alma mater: Christian-Albrechts University of Kiel, Germany; University of Hohenheim, Germany

Christian Thierfelder is a cropping systems agronomist and researcher in Africa. He is a principal scientist at the International Maize and Wheat Improvement Center (CIMMYT), a center of the Consultative Group of International Agriculture Research (CGIAR). His research areas include Conservation Agriculture Systems and their impact on crops, soils, environments, and smallholder livelihoods in southern Africa.

== Education ==
Thierfelder completed his Master's degree in Agriculture at the Christian-Albrechts University of Kiel in 1998. Following this, he went to Cali, Colombia, where he conducted his Ph.D. research with the International Center for Tropical Agriculture and earned his PhD from the University of Hohenheim in 2003.

== Career ==
Thierfelder has conducted research at the International Maize and Wheat Improvement Center (CIMMYT) and the International Center for Tropical Agriculture (CIAT) in southern Africa. He started as an adjunct scientist and post-doctoral fellow at CIMMYT from 2004 to 2007, followed by a senior research fellowship at CIAT from 2007 to 2009. Since 2009, he has held the roles of associate scientist, senior scientist, and principal scientist at CIMMYT. He is also a principal cropping systems agronomist at CIMMYT, focusing on Malawi, Zambia, and Zimbabwe, with some activities in Namibia.

As part of his research career, Thierfelder has also been involved in projects, including Facilitating the Widespread Adoption of Conservation Agriculture in Maize-Based Farming Systems in Eastern and Southern Africa; Zimbabwe R4 Rural Resillience Initiative; and Sustainable Intensification of Smallholder Farming Systems in Zambia.

== Research ==
Thierfelder's research focused on Conservation Agriculture (CA), a cropping system based on minimum tillage, surface crop residue retention, and crop diversification. His work examines soil and plant processes, environmental impacts, and the adaptation of CA to smallholder farming systems in Southern Africa, particularly Malawi, Zambia, and Zimbabwe. He has shown that CA, regenerative agriculture, and nature-based solutions (NBS) improve soil moisture, water infiltrationand crop performance during dry periods. while also emphasizing agroecological approaches that integrate sustainable soil fertility management, biodiversity promotion, and targeted management strategies. His research highlights climate change–related risks to crop yields in sub-Saharan Africa and the need to adapt African farming systems, with more recent work focusing on climate-smart and appropriate-scale mechanization and related business models for smallholders, particularly women and youth.

== Selected articles ==
- Thierfelder, Christian; Wall, Patrick C. (2009). "Effects of conservation agriculture techniques on infiltration and soil water content in Zambia and Zimbabwe". Soil and Tillage Research. 105 (2): 217–227. Bibcode:2009STilR.105..217T. doi:10.1016/j.still.2009.07.007.
- Johansen, C.; Haque, M.E.; Bell, R.W.; Thierfelder, C.; Esdaile, R.J. (2012). "Conservation agriculture for small holder rainfed farming: Opportunities and constraints of new mechanized seeding systems". Field Crops Research. 132: 18–32. Bibcode:2012FCrRe.132...18J. doi:10.1016/j.fcr.2011.11.026.
- Cairns, Jill E.; Hellin, Jon; Sonder, Kai; Araus, José Luis; MacRobert, John F.; Thierfelder, Christian; Prasanna, B. M. (2013). "Adapting maize production to climate change in sub-Saharan Africa". Food Security. 5 (3): 345–360. doi:10.1007/s12571-013-0256-x. hdl:10568/33345.
- Thierfelder, Christian; Rusinamhodzi, Leonard; Ngwira, Amos R.; Mupangwa, Walter; Nyagumbo, Isaiah; Kassie, Girma T.; Cairns, Jill E. (2015). "Conservation agriculture in Southern Africa: Advances in knowledge". Renewable Agriculture and Food Systems. 30 (4): 328–348. doi:10.1017/S1742170513000550. hdl:10568/76603.
- Powlson, David S.; Stirling, Clare M.; Thierfelder, Christian; White, Rodger P.; Jat, M.L. (2016). "Does conservation agriculture deliver climate change mitigation through soil carbon sequestration in tropical agro-ecosystems?". Agriculture, Ecosystems & Environment. 220: 164–174. Bibcode:2016AgEE..220..164P. doi:10.1016/j.agee.2016.01.005.
- Steward, Peter R.; Dougill, Andrew J.; Thierfelder, Christian; Pittelkow, Cameron M.; Stringer, Lindsay C.; Kudzala, Maxwell; Shackelford, Gorm E. (2018). "The adaptive capacity of maize-based conservation agriculture systems to climate stress in tropical and subtropical environments: A meta-regression of yields". Agriculture, Ecosystems & Environment. 251: 194–202. Bibcode:2018AgEE..251..194S. doi:10.1016/j.agee.2017.09.019.
- Harrison, Rhett D.; Thierfelder, Christian; Baudron, Frédéric; Chinwada, Peter; Midega, Charles; Schaffner, Urs; van den Berg, Johnnie (2019). "Agro-ecological options for fall armyworm (Spodoptera frugiperda JE Smith) management: Providing low-cost, smallholder friendly solutions to an invasive pest". Journal of Environmental Management. 243: 318–330. Bibcode:2019JEnvM.243..318H. doi:10.1016/j.jenvman.2019.05.011. hdl:10568/103986. PMID 31102899.
- Komarek, Adam M.; Thierfelder, Christian; Steward, Peter R. (2021). "Conservation agriculture improves adaptive capacity of cropping systems to climate stress in Malawi". Agricultural Systems. 190 103117. Bibcode:2021AgSys.19003117K. doi:10.1016/j.agsy.2021.103117. hdl:10568/113023.
