= BioUML =

Bioinformatics software

- Original author(s): Fedor A. Kolpakov
- Developer(s): BioUML team
- Initial release: 2002; 23 years ago
- Stable release: v. 2023.3 / September 2023; 1 year ago
- Written in: Java
- Available in: English
- Type: Bioinformatics
- Website: https://www.biouml.org/

BioUML (Biological Universal Modeling Language) is an open-source web-based software platform written in Java with support for JavaScript and R. The main field is systems biology and data analysis - visualization of biological data, modeling of biological systems, as well as access to bioinformatics databases. It was originally developed by Fedor Kolpakov in 2002 in collaboration between Biosoft.Ru and the Institute of Systems Biology in Novosibirsk, Russia.

== Available versions ==
The current release of BioUML is version 2023.3 released in September 2023.

BioUML Server offers access to data and analysis methods installed server-side for BioUML clients (workbench and web edition) over the Internet.

BioUML Workbench is a Java application that can work standalone or as "thick client" for the BioUML server edition.

BioUML Web Edition is a web browser based "thin client" for the BioUML server edition and provides most of the functionality of the BioUML workbench. It utilizes AJAX and HTML5 <canvas> technology for interactive data editing and visual modeling.

The platform has been developed continuously since 2002 and offers data analysis and visualizations for scientists involved in complex molecular biology research. The system allows for the formalized description of biological systems structure and function including tools required to make discoveries related to genomics, proteomics, transcriptomics and metabolomics. The BioUML platform is built in a modular architecture which has allowed for the relatively simple addition of new tools. This has allowed the integration of many 3rd party tools into the platform over the 7 years it has been available.

== Application and usage ==
BioUML was used for visualization of data from Cyclonet's integrated database on cell cycle regulation and carcinogenesis in 2007

Next-generation sequencing (NGS) and other high throughput methods create huge data sets (called "big data") in the region of 100 terabytes upwards. BioUML can disseminate, analyze and produce visualizations and simulations. It allows for parameter fitting and supports several analysis techniques required to deal with large amounts of raw data. The management of large volumes of data, commonly referred to as 'big data,' poses technical challenges in terms of storage, delivery, and sharing due to the collaborative nature of research across multiple institutions. A typical genome data set might contain 500 terabytes of data which may need to be shared, often internationally using Internet2 technology. Proprietary data compression mechanisms have been created (by Valex LLC) for the NCBI Short Read Archive Project that allow for the delivery of raw research data at speeds of up to 40 Gbit/s. To provide a full solution for such collaborative research, the makers of BioUML have developed a new hardware/software system in partnership with Valex LLC. This version of BioUML is called Bio datomics.
