= Lewis Seiden =

American pharmacologist

- Born: August 1, 1934; Chicago, Illinois
- Died: July 26, 2007 (aged 72)
- Education: University of Chicago (A.B., 1956; S.B., 1958; Ph.D., 1962)
- Spouse: Anne Seiden (m. 1962)
- Children: 3
- Scientific career
- Fields: Neuropharmacology
- Institutions: University of Chicago
- Thesis: A proposed mechanism of monoamine oxidase inhibition by iproniazid (1962)
- Notable students: George Ricaurte

Lewis Stanford Seiden (August 1, 1934 in Chicago, Illinois—July 26, 2007 in Chicago, Illinois) was an American pharmacologist and professor at the University of Chicago.

== Early life and education ==
Seiden was born in Chicago on August 1, 1934, where he grew up in the South Shore neighborhood. After graduating from high school, he received a full scholarship to the University of Chicago, where he had intended to study medicine. However, in 1950, when he was about to graduate from high school, he developed dystonia; he resumed studies at the University of Chicago the following year after recovering. He continued to struggle with dystonia for the rest of his life. He received his A.B. from the University of Chicago in 1956, where he also received his S.B. in 1958 and his Ph.D. in 1962. After receiving his Ph.D., he did postdoctoral research in the lab of Arvid Carlsson at the University of Gothenburg in Sweden for two years (1962–3), and then did another postdoc with Keith Killam from 1964 to 1965 at Stanford University.

== Career ==
Seiden joined the faculty at the University of Chicago in 1963 as a research associate, and returned as an instructor in 1965. He became a full professor there in 1977, and remained on the faculty there until he retired.

== Research ==
Seiden was known for his work in neuropharmacology and the effects of drugs on the brain, especially amphetamine. He also researched the effects of ecstasy on brain cells, research which influenced the Drug Enforcement Administration to name it a schedule 1 drug.

== Honors and awards ==
Seiden was a fellow of the American Association for the Advancement of Science and of the American Psychological Association. In 1999, he received an honorary doctorate in medicine from the University of Gothenburg. In 2002, he received the University of Chicago’s Gold Key Award.
