= Celada–Seiden model =

In cell biology, the Celada-Seiden model is a logical description at the inter-cellular level of the mechanisms making up the adaptive immune humoral and cellular response to a genetic antigen.

The computational counterpart of the Celada-Seiden model is IMMSIM and variants C-IMMSIM and LImmSim.
