= Leibniz Institute for Science and Mathematics Education at Kiel University =

German research institute

Coordinates: 54.3403°N 10.1181°E

- Leibniz-Institut für die Pädagogik der Naturwissenschaften und Mathematik
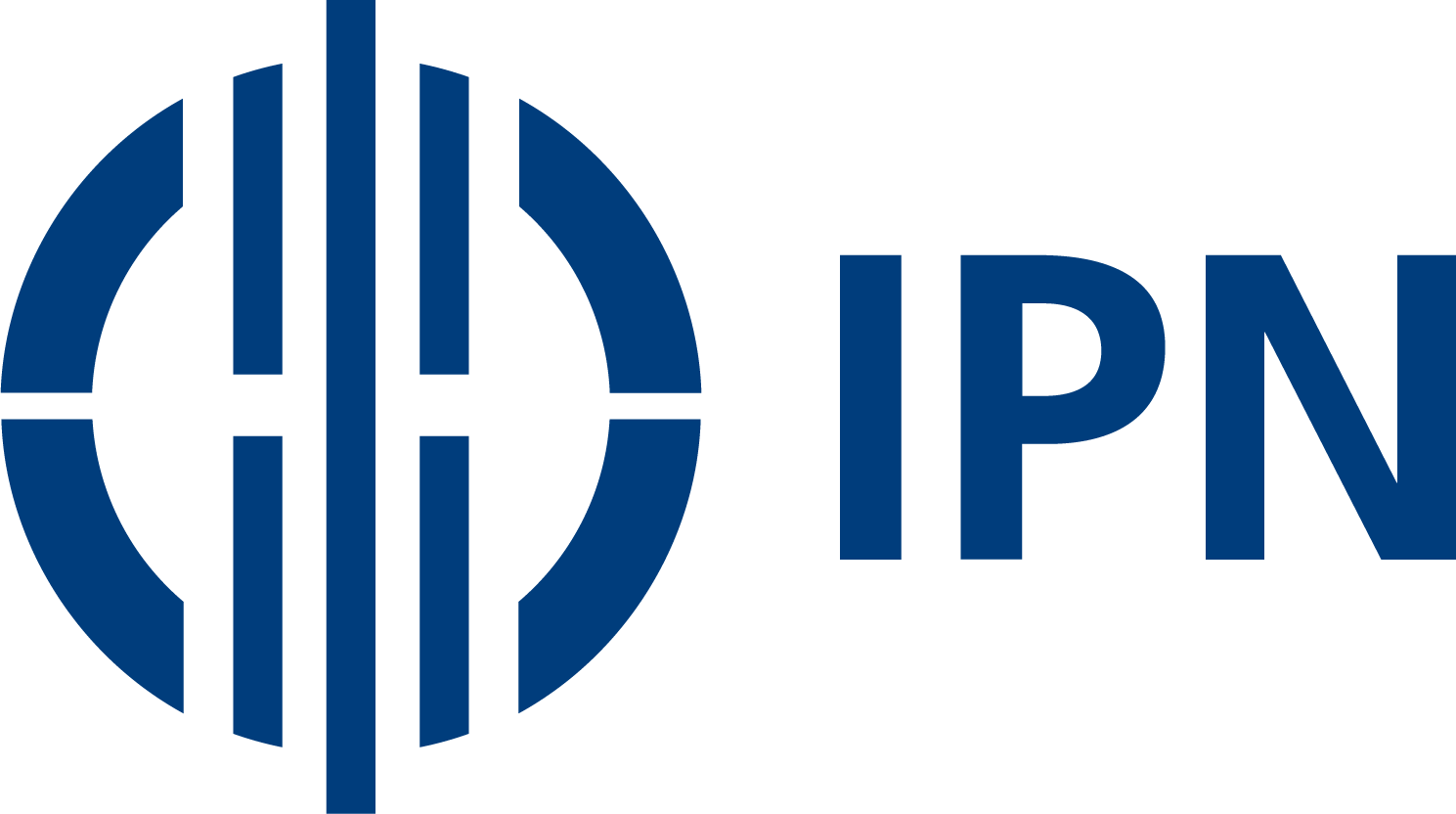
- Abbreviation: IPN
- Founded: 1966
- Type: Research Institute
- Legal status: Foundation (nonprofit)
- Location: Kiel, Germany
- Members: Leibniz Association
- Leader: Olaf Koeller
- Staff: 202
- Website: www.ipn.uni-kiel.de

The Leibniz Institute for Science and Mathematics Education at Kiel University (IPN; German: Leibniz-Institut für die Pädagogik der Naturwissenschaften und Mathematik), previously known as the Leibniz Institute for Science Education, is a scientific institute in the field of Education Research as well as the Didactic method of Natural science in Germany. It is a member of the Leibniz Association and located in Kiel, Germany. Although it is not part of Kiel University, the two maintain a strong relationship.

The institute was founded in 1966 by physicist Karl Hecht (with participation of Werner Krobel), who remained director until 1971.

== History ==
In 1957, the "Sputnik shock" caused a rethinking of education policy in the US and in Europe. Accordingly, Karl Hecht, in the early 1960s, proposed to establish an institute for science teaching and learning.

On 1 December 1966, eight employees began working under Hecht in the Institute of Applied Physics at Kiel University; the first two departments were Physics Education and Chemistry Education. The IPN building was then constructed and opened in October 1970, following three years of construction work funded by the Volkswagen Foundation. Hecht remained director until 1971, when Karl Frey was appointed as Hecht's successor.

The IPN became an institute of the state of Schleswig-Holstein on 1 January 1980. In 2007, the IPN became an "independent foundation governed by public law".

In 2001, the IPN changed its name to the Leibniz Institute for Science Education (to demonstrate its affiliation to the Leibniz Community); it changed its name again in 2011 to the Leibniz Institute for Science and Mathematics Education at Kiel University.

== Activities ==
Its main purpose is to promote the development of educational research in the field of Natural Science. Among other studies the institute carried out the Programme for International Student Assessment 2003 and 2006, SINUS, ChiK, LeLa, LLL, LUV, System Earth as well as the GLOBE Program.

The IPN is engaged in various German Science Olympiades (Biology, Chemistry, Physics), the German Youth Environment Competition (BUW) and the German preliminaries of the International Junior Science Olympiad.

== Department ==
The institute has 202 employees and is structured into seven departments:

- Educational Research and Educational Psychology
- Educational Measurement
- Knowledge Transfer
- Didactic method of Biology Education
- Didactic method of Chemistry Education
- Didactic method of Physics Education
- Didactic method of Mathematics Education

as well as the department of paedagogical and psychological methods (part of the department for educational research).

== Notable people and projects ==
- In 2017, Katrin Kruse, a scientist at the IPN, supervised the project Plastikpiraten, where students aged 10 to 16 collected plastic waste in German rivers in a collaboration with the northern German research lab Kieler Forschungswerkstatt.
- The DoLiS project, which compares education in Germany to education in Sweden, is a collaboration between Umeå University and the IPN.
