= Sæmundará =

River in Skagafjörður, Iceland

Sæmundará Staðará, Sæmundarlækur
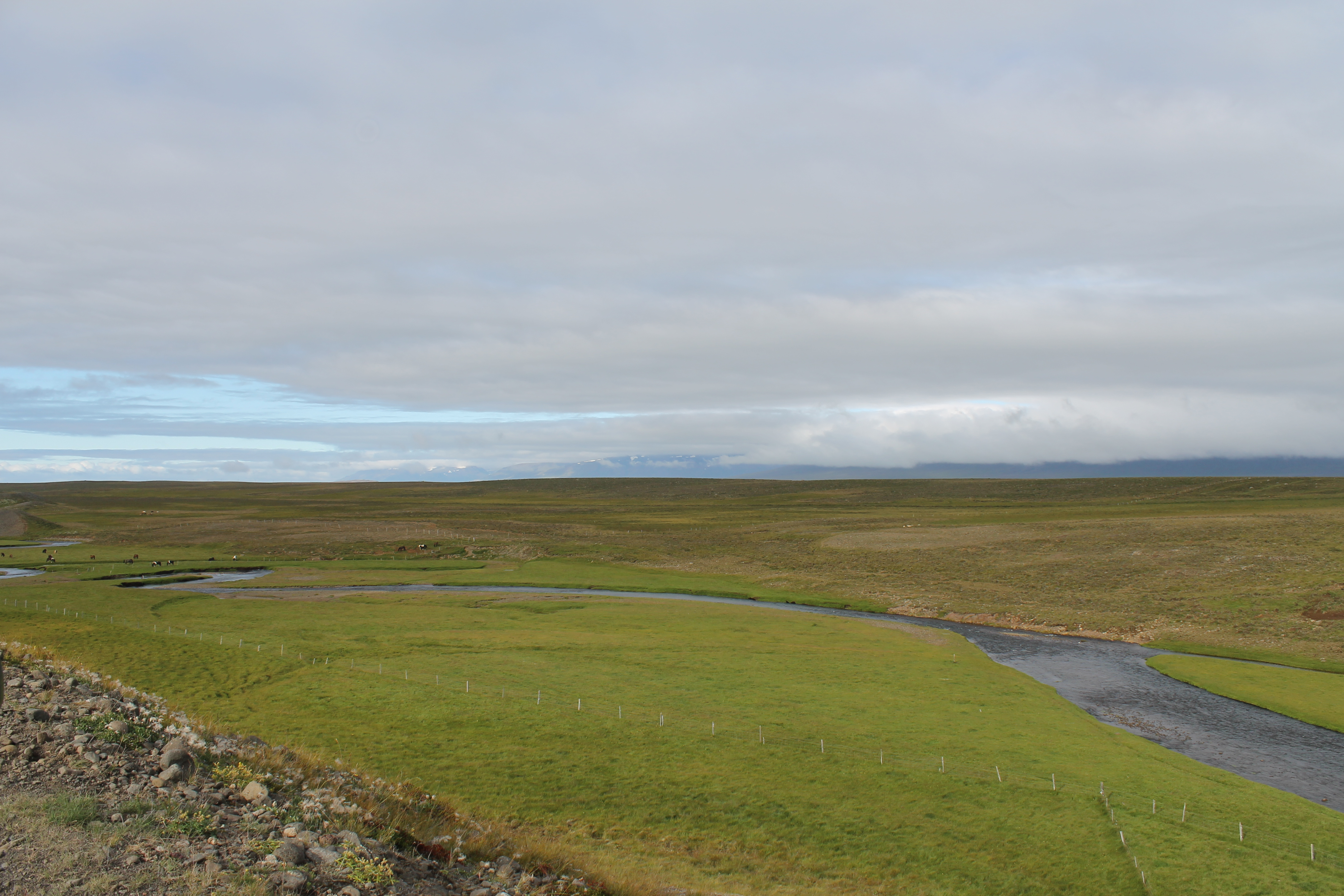
- Sæmundará as seen from Sæmundarhlið slope, east over Langholt
- Etymology: Sæmundur's River

Location
- Country: Iceland
- Region: Skagafjörður

Physical characteristics
- Mouth: Miklavatn
  - coordinates: 65°41′09″N 19°34′25″W

Basin features
- Cities: Langholt, Reynistaður

The Sæmundará river is a spring creek on the western side of Skagafjörður, Iceland. It originates in Vatnsskarð pass, in Vatnshlíðarvatn lake and Valadalur dalur, curving to the north as it descends from the mountain pass, and running along the full length of Sæmundarhlíð (Sæmundur slope). At the end of Langholt, it turns east and runs along the hay field in Reynistaður, then curves northward again before finally ending in Miklavatn. After the bend in the river, it is generally called the Staðará river, named after Reynistaður. The Landnámabók refers to it as Sæmundarlækur.

The river is excellent for fishing, and people fish there for both salmon and char. The river's water level is usually rather low.
