= Route 744 (Iceland) =

Highway in northern Iceland

Route 744
- Þjóðvegur 744
- Þverárfjallsvegur

Route information
- Length: 35 km (22 mi)
- Existed: 2000–present

Major junctions
- West end: Route 74
- East end: Route 75

Location
- Country: Iceland

Highway system
- Roads in Iceland

Route 744, called Þjóðvegur 744 or Þverárfjallsvegur (lit. 'Þverárfjall Road') in Icelandic, is a road in northern Iceland that connects Skagastrandarvegur Road (Route 74) to Sauðárkrókur. The road is about 35 kilometres (22 mi) long and was finished in fall 2007, when a new bridge simultaneously opened over the Gönguskarðsá river.

In 2000, the road's construction began with a 12-kilometre (7.5 mi) road over Þverárfjall mountain itself between Húnavatnssýsla and Skagafjörður. It had previously been a car-friendly summer route, which required fording rivers and streams without bridges. The road over the mountain at its highest point is 330 metres (1,080 ft) above sea level. This section of the road was completed in fall 2002, at which time the road was opened. Finishing that section of the road shortened the path between Sauðárkrókur and Blönduós by about 38 kilometres (24 mi). Between 2003 and 2004, the Skagastrandvegur road, which went around Laxárdalur and Norðurádalur valleys to the town of Þverá, was raised. A new road was built in the year 2006–2007 on the Skagafjörður side, which led to Gönguskörð and on to Sauðárkrókur.
