= Espihóll =

Farm in Eyjafjarðarsveit, Iceland

- Farm
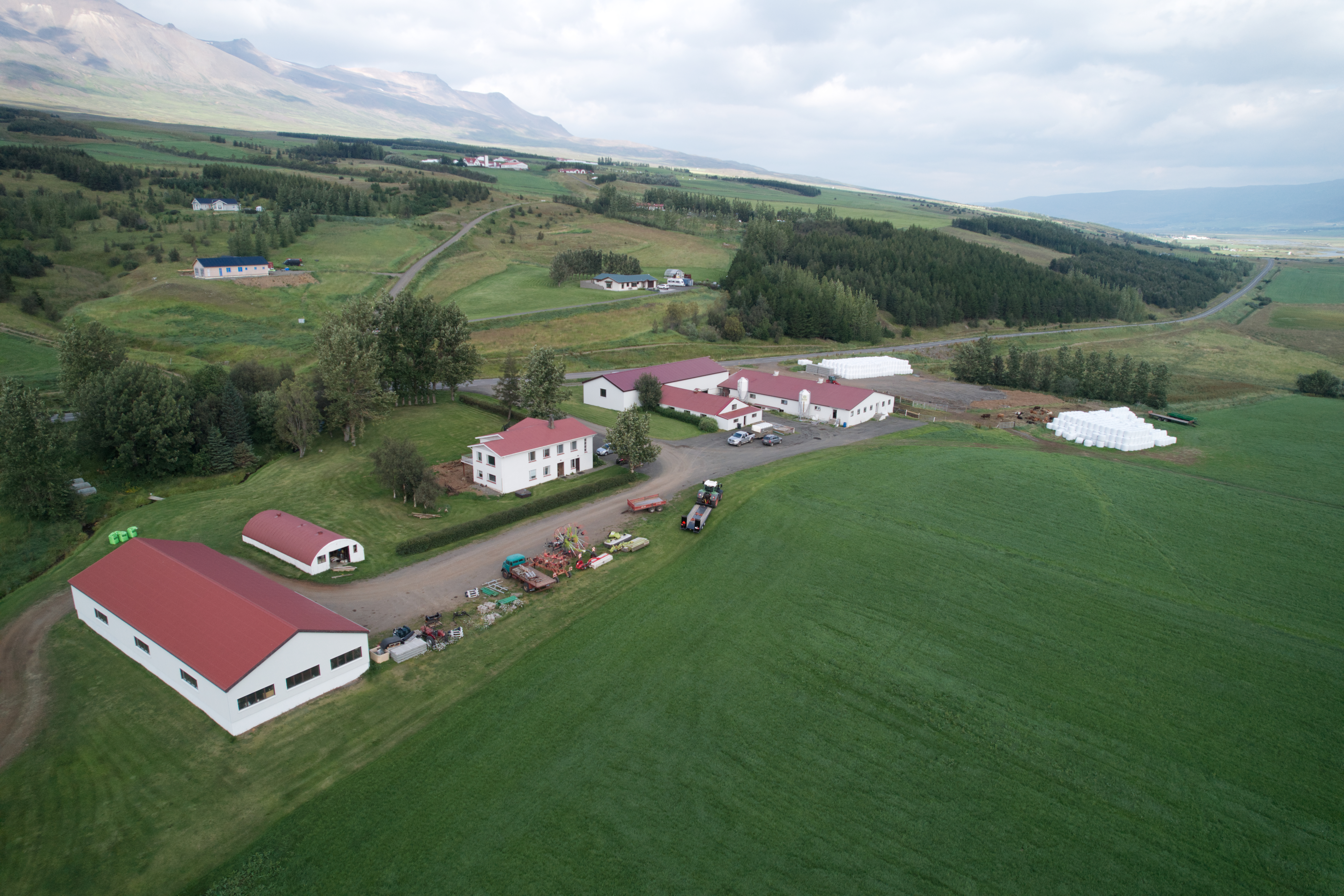
- Interactive map of Espihóll
- Coordinates: 65°32′16.577″N 18°7′44.504″W
- Country: Iceland
- County: Eyjafjarðarsveit
- Founder: Þórarinn
- Time zone: UTC+0

Espihóll is a farm and old manor in Eyjafjarðarsveit county, Iceland that previously belonged to the rural municipality Hrafnagilshreppur. There is a large hill of the same name (the hóll in Espihóll is the Icelandic word for "hill") south of the farm.

== History ==
According to the Landnámabók, the first farmer in Espihóll was Þórarinn, the son of Þórir Hámundarson and grandson of Helgi "magri" ("the meager") Eyvindarson. The farm is mentioned in several sources in old Icelandic literature and appears in Víga-Glúms saga. Espihóll is also named in Sturlunga saga, in which Kolbeinn "grön" ("the mustachioed") Dufgusson was killed by Gissur Þorvaldsson's men in 1253 in retaliation for the Flugumýri Arson.

In Espihóll there was a ranch where some of the major Eyjafjörður county chiefs lived. The farm long served as the residence of the sýslumaður, or sheriff. In the 17th century, Sheriff Björn Pálsson, the grandson of Bishop Guðbrandur Þorláksson lived there and so did his son Magnús after Guðbrandurdied. Magnús' wife was Sigríður the elder, the daughter of Bishop Jón Vigfússon, and together they were had many children. In the latter part of the 18th century, Sheriff Jón Jakobsson lived in Espihóll. He was among the pioneers who ushered in the Age of Enlightenment and, among other things, conducted some of the first known Icelandic experiments on sheep shearing. His son, Jón Espólín, a sheriff and chronicler who was named after the farm, was born in Espihóll in 1769.

Stefán Thorarensen, son of the amtmann Stefán Þórarinson, lived in Espihóll and drowned in the Eyjafjarðará river in the spring of 1844. Afterwards, the area was thought to be haunted, especially at Stórholt hill between Espihóll and the Stokkahlaða barn.

Shortly after the beginning of the 19th century, Sheriff Eggert Breim lived in Espihóll for some time. His daughter, Elín Briem, school director and author of Kvennafræðarinn (The Female Teacher), was born there.
