= Ketubjörg =

Sea cliffs in Skagafjörður, Iceland

- Sea cliffs
- Interactive map of Ketubjörg
- Coordinates: 66°2′4.265″N 20°0′14.292″W
- Location: Skagafjörður, Iceland

Ketubjörg are impressive sea cliffs in Skagafjörður, Iceland, just south of the abandoned farm Keta on the Skagi peninsula. The cliffs were formed from the remains of an ice age volcano that the sea has eroded, resulting in rock pillar formations and a large cleft in the rocks.

At Ketubjörg, which is just over 120 meters tall, there is columnar basalt and, outside of that, there are isolated rock pillars, the biggest of which is called Kerling or "old lady." The cliff is home to rich bird life and the cliffs are a protected site.

The national highway used to follow the edge of the cliff and was sometimes considered difficult to travel though. This is because, according to folklore, there was a large settlement of trolls in Ketubjörg and the trolls held parliament in the cleft in cliffs, which was called Tröllalögrétta ("Troll Legislature"). Priests at Keta's church, which was a church served by priests from Hvammur in Laxárdalur, were accustomed to ringing the bell when they arrived at the hill, called Presthóll (Priests' hill), and continued when they rode alongside the cliffs. When Reverend Hálfdán of Fell served the congregation for a time, he succeeded in getting rid of the trolls using sorcery.
