= Fremri-Kot =

Farm in Skagafjörður, Iceland

Fremri-Kot Hökustaðir
- Farm
- Interactive map of Fremri-Kot
- Coordinates: 65°27′20.948″N 18°58′26.454″W
- Country: Iceland
- County: Skagafjörður

Fremri-Kot is the innermost farm in Norðurárdalur valley in the foothills of Öxnadalsheiði in Skagafjörður, Iceland. According to the Landnámabók, the farm was previously called Hökustaðir, and it states that the Örreksheiði plateau, a little farther up from Hökustaðir, was named after the settler Þorbrandur örrek. The place name Örreksheiði is now unknown.

== History ==
Hökustaðir is also mentioned in the Sturlunga Saga as the location to which Eyjólfur ofsi ("the violent") Þorsteinsson went with his troops for the Flugumýri Arson in fall 1253. He posted guards there so news of the arsonist's arrival would not spread. Þorgils skarði Böðvarsson also stopped there on the way to the Battle of Þverárfundur in 1255. Hökustaðir and Þorbrandsstaðir's names were probably not changed to Fremri-Kot and Ytri-Kot, respectively, until the 16th or 17th century, possibly following landslides that may have left the farms destroyed for some time.

There were many landslides in Norðurádalur on July 6, 1954, after heavy rains during the previous 24 hours. In Fremri-Kot, landslides destroyed the majority of the hay field as well as sheep sheds, barns, stables, and hay lofts. A large part of the highway was also destroyed, and the Valagilsá river, which runs along the border between Kot and Silfrastaðaafrétt, swept away the bridge and overran the levee. The housewife at Fremri-Kot, Sigurlaug Sigurlaugsdóttir, was home alone with five young children, and she intended to seek shelter with them in the sheep shed, which she thought would be safer than the farm house. She made it into the farmyard, however, a huge landslide stopped just above the house and did not destroy it, but the sheep shed, which was further up the slope than the house, was swept away in the landslide.

The siblings Ólína Jónasdóttir (1885–1956), a poet; Hallgrímur Jónasson (1894–1991), a teacher; and Frímann Ágúst Jónasson, a school principal were all raised on Fremi-Kot and are associated with the farm.
