= Þverárfjall =

Mountain in northern Iceland

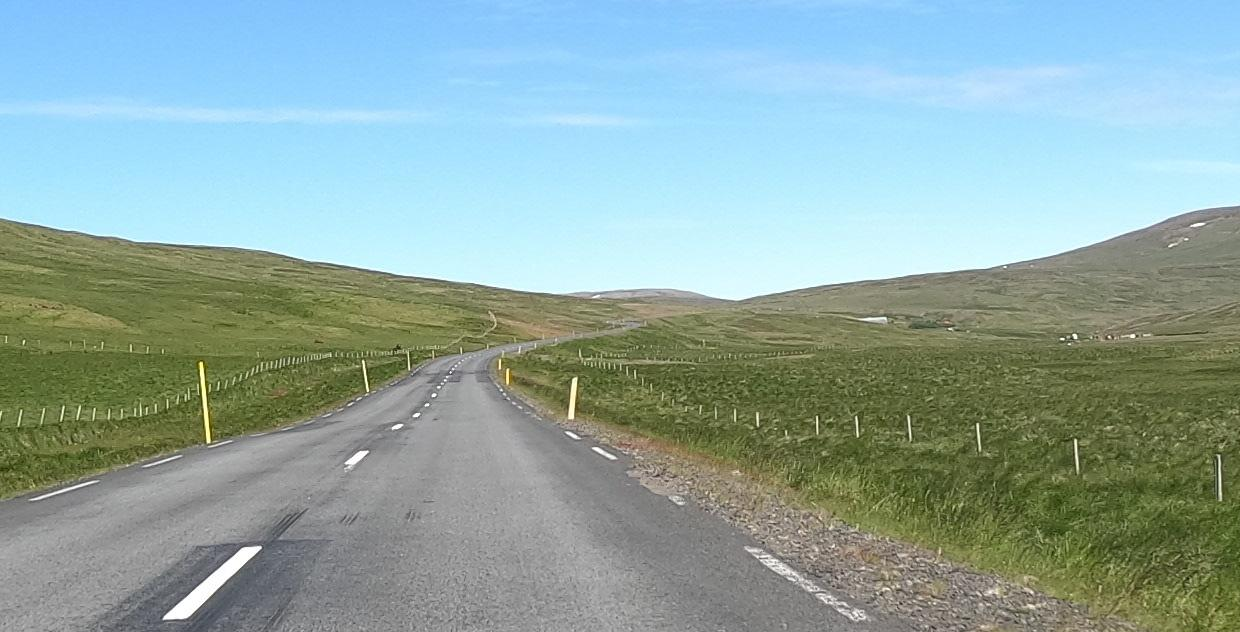
- Þverárleiti

Highest point
- Elevation: 322 m (1,056 ft)
- Coordinates: 65°46′36.430″N 20°1′46.582″W

Naming
- English translation: Tributary mountain
- Language of name: Icelandic

Geography
- Location within Iceland
- Location: Skagafjörður, Iceland

Þverárfjall (also called Þverárleiti) is a mountain in Austur-Húnavatnssýsla, Iceland between Norðurárdalur valley, which runs to the northwest from what is often called "front Laxárdalur" in Austur-Húnavatnssýsla and the Laxárdalur in Skagafjörður. The mountain is named after Þverá, the innermost town in Norðurárdalur valley. Þverárfjallsvegur road (Þjóðvegur 744/Route 744) was built over the mountain in summer 2002. Previously, there was a road only open in the summer that required travels to go slowly, which crossed un-bridged rivers and streams. The new highway shortened the route between Blönduós and Sauðarkrókur by about 30 kilometers (18.6 miles).

On June 3, 2008, a driver passing through the area of Þverárfjall spotted a polar bear a short distance from the road. The bear was killed the same day.
