= Kristnes =

- human settlement
- Coordinates: 65°36′N 18°05′W
- Country: Iceland

Population (1 January 2018)
  - Total: 52

Kristnes (Icelandic pronunciation: [ˈkʰrɪstˌnɛːs]) is a village located in Eyjafjarðarsveit municipality in northern Iceland. The population is of around 52 inhabitants in 2018.
