= Laxárdalur (Skagafjörður) =

Valley in Skagafjörður, Iceland

Laxádalur
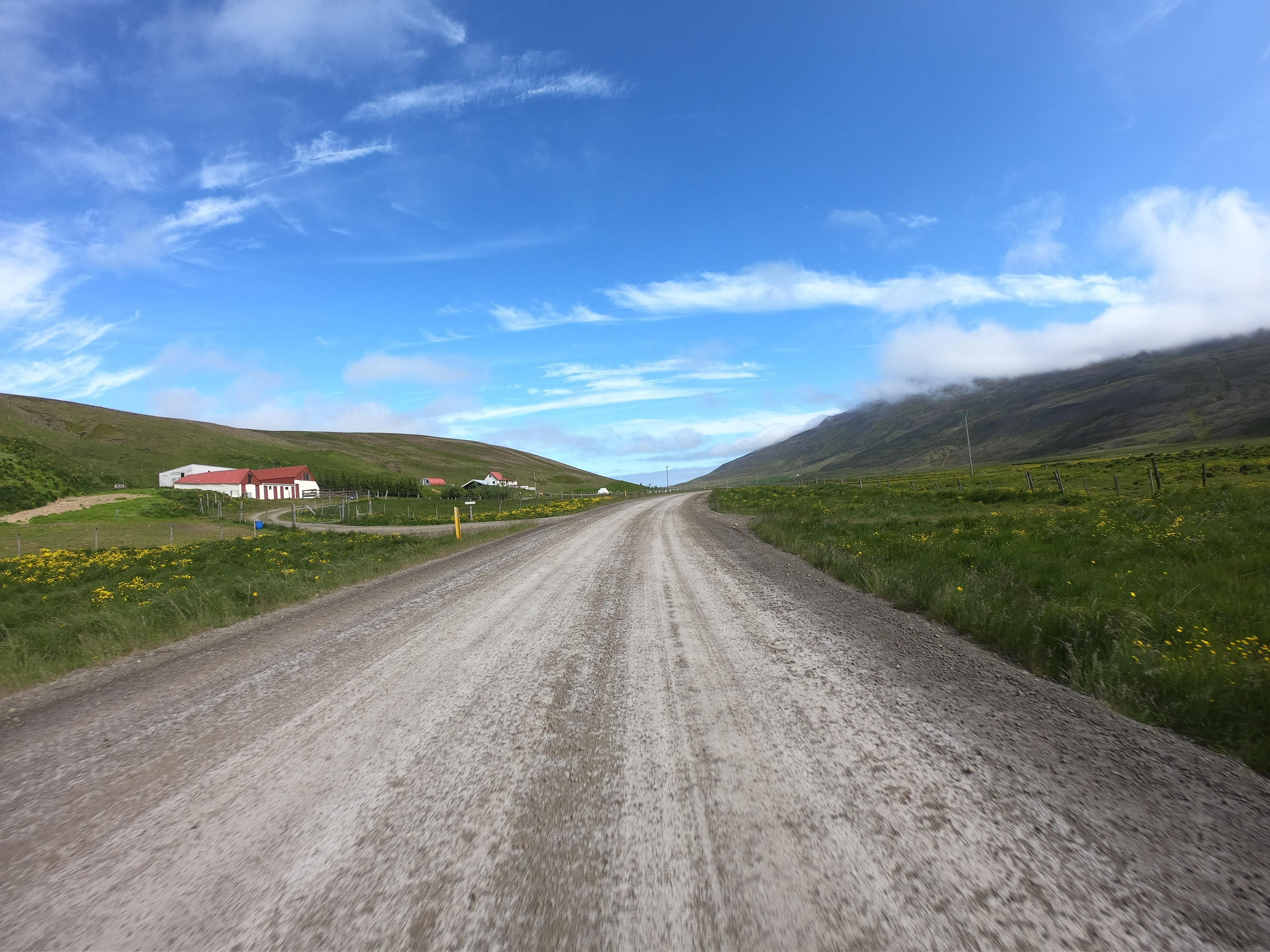
- Laxádalur
- Length: 14 km (8.7 mi)

Naming
- English translation: Salmon river valley

Geography
- Country: Iceland
- State/Province: Skagafjörður
- Coordinates: 65°50′54″N 19°51′59″W 65°49′24.578″N 19°52′39.374″W
- River: Laxá
- Interactive map of Laxádalur

Laxárdalur is a valley located to the west of Tindastóll mountain in Skagafjörður County, Iceland. It is 14 kilometers (8.7 miles) long and heads toward the sea north of Tindastóll where it is called Sævarlandsvík. Beyond the valley, Laxárdalur becomes Skagi.

The valley is located almost due south along Tindastóll, and to the west are low hills and ridges. The valley then curves to the southwest and narrows. The river Laxá, which originates in Hryggjafjall mountain in Staðarfjöll, runs through the valley. There were several farms in Laxárdalur; some are inhabited but others have been abandoned. Hvammur was the church site and parsonage, and thought to have been the homestead of Eilífur örn Atlason who, according to the Landnámabók, settled Laxárdalur.

Laxárdalur is now much more well-traveled than it used to be since the road that runs through Laxárdalur and Gönguskörð to Sauðárkrókur was built over Þverárfjall mountain.

== Farms ==
Inhabited farms:

- Sævarland
- Þorbjargarstaðir
- Hafragil

Abandoned farms:

- Skefilsstaðir
- Hvammur
- Skíðastaðir
- Hrafnagil
