= Keta (Skagafjörður) =

Old manor and church site in Skagafjörður, Iceland

- Coordinates: 66°3′7.747″N 20°1′11.611″W
- Country: Iceland
- County: Skagafjörður

Keta is an old manor and church site on the east side of the Skagi peninsula located in Skagafjörður County, Iceland.

== Background ==
Keta was a church not connected to a parish whose congregation came from Hvammur in Laxárdalur, but is now serviced from Sauðárkrókur after the Hvammur vicarage was closed down in 1975. The Keta parish extends across Austur-Húnavatnssýsla county as the northernmost towns in Skagi, Húnavatnssýsla, belong to the parish.

There was a fishing station accessible from Keta during fishing season, and the area benefits from good trout fishing. Keta's shore is also home to the impressive Ketubjörg sea cliffs, which are volcanic remains from the ice age. Here there is columnar basalt, rock arches and pillars, and a little further out in the sea there is a lone rock outcropping called Kerling.
