= Heiðará =

River in Skagafjörður, Iceland

Coordinates: 65°27′51.91″N 18°47′33.43″W

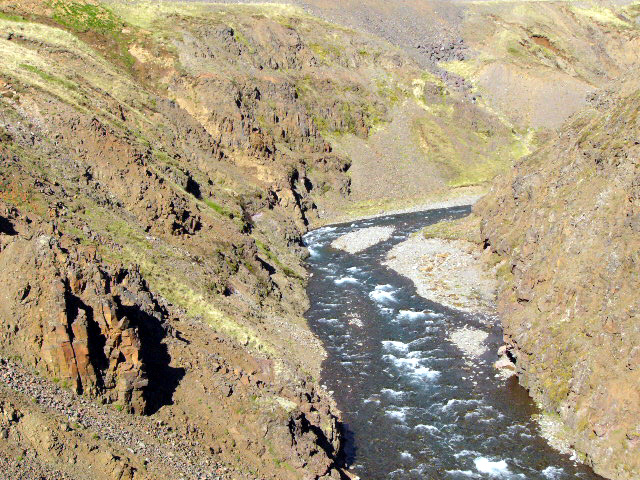
- The Heiðará river

Location
- Country: Iceland
- Region: Skagafjörður

Physical characteristics
- Mouth: Öxnadalsheiði

Basin features
- Progression: Norðurá→Héraðsvötn→Skagafjörður

Heiðará is a spring creek that runs westward through Öxnadalsheiði plateau in Skagafjörður, Iceland and later flows into the Norðurá river where it descends into Norðurárdalur valley. The river originates in Kaldbaksdalur valley, which runs southward just east of the border between Skagafjörður and Eyjafjörður counties on the plateau.

At a lower elevation, near the bottom of Öxnadalsheiði on the side closest to Norðurárdalur, there is only a narrow valley and the Heiðará river runs through it in an enormous and rather deep gorge. Today, the road runs along the upper edge of the slope, that is, along the edge of the ravine. However, in previous centuries, there were tight riding paths, which were often impassible for long periods during the winter due to the snow and slippery ice. Travelers needed to navigate through the bottom of the ravine right along the river, and this was considered a treacherous route.
