= Elín Briem =

Icelandic cookbook writer (1856–1937)

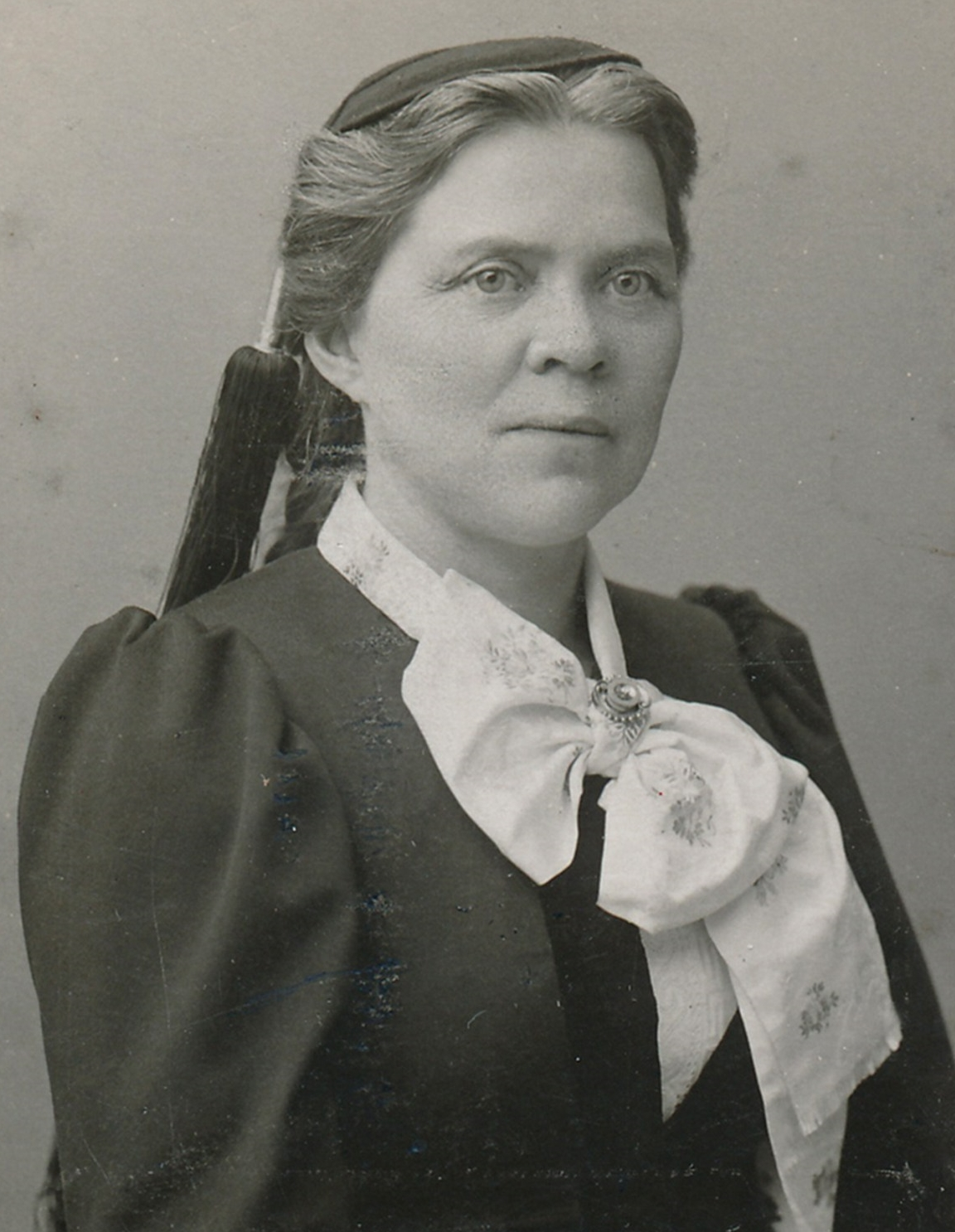
Elín Briem

Elín Rannveig Briem (19 October 1856 – 4 December 1937) was an Icelandic teacher and writer who in 1889 published one of Iceland's most popular books, Kvennafræðarinn (The Women's Instructor). Principally a cookbook, it also provided advice to housewives on health, hygiene and economics. The work was based on the classes she gave to her students while headmistress of the girls college at Ytri-Ey near Skagaströnd in the north of Iceland.

== Early life and education ==
Born on 19 October 1856 at Espihóll on the Eyjafjörður, Elín Rannveig Briem was the daughter of Eggert Gunnlaugson Briem, a county magistrate (sýslumaður) in northern and northwestern Iceland, and his wife Ingibjörg Eiríksdóttir. Elín was the 10th in a family of 19 children. The family moved frequently, settling in Reynistaður near Sauðárkrókur in 1872. There the children were taught privately at home, learning all the normal subjects as well as English, Danish and German. Elín and her sister Kristin strongly supported the establishment of the first girls' school for the north of Iceland. It opened in 1877 in Skagafjörður county.

== Career ==
After teaching at the Skagafjörður School for some time, Elín went to Denmark in 1881 to train as a teacher at Natalie Zahle's School in Copenhagen. On graduating in 1883, she returned to Iceland to head the newly formed women's school at Ytri Ey. She stayed there under 1895, initially with 20 students but numbers grew rapidly attracting girls from throughout the country. In addition to the principal, there were two other teachers. The subjects taught were writing, arithmetic, geography, Danish, English, history and cookery.

On 1 June 1895, Elín married Sæmund Eyjólfsson, a farmer who had studied theology and was also a prolific writer. They moved together to Reykjavík but he died less than a year later. After his death, she moved back to her old Sauðárkrókur school. She soon met one of her old childhood friends, Stefán Jónsson, who had become a shopkeeper. They married in May 1903, after which Elín became known as Elín Jónsson. The marriage did not last very long as Stefán died on 5 May 1910.

Elín once again took on the role of headmistress in 1912 but had to retire in 1915 as her health deteriorated. She spent the remainder of her life in Reykjavík. Although she had no children of her own, she had a foster son, Sæmund Helgason, who worked for the post office.

== Cookbook ==
In her spare time, Elín wrote Kvennafræðarinn, first published in 1888. The 3,000 copies from the first edition were soon sold out, leading to three further editions in 1891, 1904 and 1911. While three-quarters of the book presented recipes, it also contained advice for housewives on nutrition, hygiene, cleaning and even economics. As a result, the book proved to have considerable impact on Icelandic cooking and housekeeping. The book is considered to be one of the most extensively published in Iceland.

== Later life ==
Throughout her life, Elín contributed to improvements in education, housekeeping and healthy living. For her achievements, she received the Order of the Falcon. In later years, she continued to write. She died in Reykjavík on 4 December 1937.
