= Sæmundarhlíð =

Area in Skagafjörður, Iceland

- Slope
- Interactive map of Sæmundarhlíð
- Coordinates: 65°36′4.518″N 19°36′18.644″W
- Location: Skagafjörður, Iceland
- Etymology: Icelandic for "Sæmundur's slope", named for Sæmundur ("the Herbidean") suðureyski

Sæmundarhlíð ("Sæmundur's slope") is a district on the western side of Skagafjörður, Iceland and is located between mountain slopes off the south of Vatnsskarð near the base of Reynistaður. The eastern border runs along Sæmundará river, which flows between the long side of the slope and then curves to the east a short distance from Reynistaður. During the settlement of Iceland, it seemed that Sæmundarhlíð referred to area that extended farther to the north, all the way to Gönguskarðsá river. The area is named after the settler Sæmundur suðureyski ("the Herbidean").

There are some farms in Sæmundarhlíð. The southernmost is Fjall, which is sometimes considered to be part of the Vatnsskarðsbær farms, and is located on the road to Fjall out from Route 1 in Vatnsskarð pass, and not from Sæmundarhlíð. To the north there is the abandoned farm Skarðsá where, in the 17th century, the annal writer and scholar Björn Jónsson lived. Among other works, Björn wrote the Skarðsárannál (Skarðsá annal).

The region’s outermost farm is Geirmundarstaðir where the swing music legend Geirmundur Valtýsson comes from.
