= Norðurá =

Norðurá is the name of two rivers in Iceland:

- Norðurá (Borgarfjörður), which runs through the Borgarfjörður fjord of western Iceland
- Norðurá (Skagafjörður), which runs through the Skagafjörður fjord of northern Iceland
