= Laxá (Skagafjörður) =

Spring creek in Skagafjörður, Iceland

Laxá í Laxárdal Laxá á Skaga
- Etymology: Laxá is Icelandic for "Salmon river"

Location
- Country: Iceland
- Region: Skagafjörður

Physical characteristics
- Source: Hryggjafjall mountain
  - coordinates: 65°49′5.981″N 19°53′38.983″W
- Mouth: Sævarlandsvík

The Laxá river in Laxárdalur valley, also called Laxá á Skaga (Laxá in Skagi) is a spring creek that runs through Laxárdalur in Skagafjörður, Iceland to the sea in Sævarlandsvík, north of Tindastóll mountain. The river originates at Hryggjafjall mountain by Staðarfjöll mountain. There is some salmon fishing in the river.
