= Hvammur í Laxárdal =

Farm and church site in Skagafjörður, Iceland

- Former farm and vicarage
- Interactive map of Hvammur í Laxárdal
- Country: Iceland
- County: Skagafjörður

Hvammur í Laxárdal (Hvammur in Laxárdalur valley) is an abandoned farm, church site, and former vicarage in Skagafjörður County, Iceland.

== Description ==
Hvammur is in Laxárdalur valley, which is west of Tindastóll mountain. It previously belonged to Skefilsstaðahreppur, but is now part of Skagafjörður County and it fell under the authority of the Sauðárkrókur parish after the parish closed down in 1970, which included both Hvammur and the church in Keta in Skagi. The priests' wages were considered extremely meager in Hvammur and the priests were poor.

The church in Hvammur used to be called Ólafskirkja, dedicated to Saint Ólaf. The current church is made of wood and was built in 1892.

There is an old, abandoned farm a short distance from Hvammur called Atlastaðir. It is said that Atli, son of the settler Eilífur örn (“the eagle”) Atlason, had lived there, but it is likely that Hvammur had been Eilífur's homestead.
