= Kjálki =

Small district in Skagafjörður, Iceland

- District
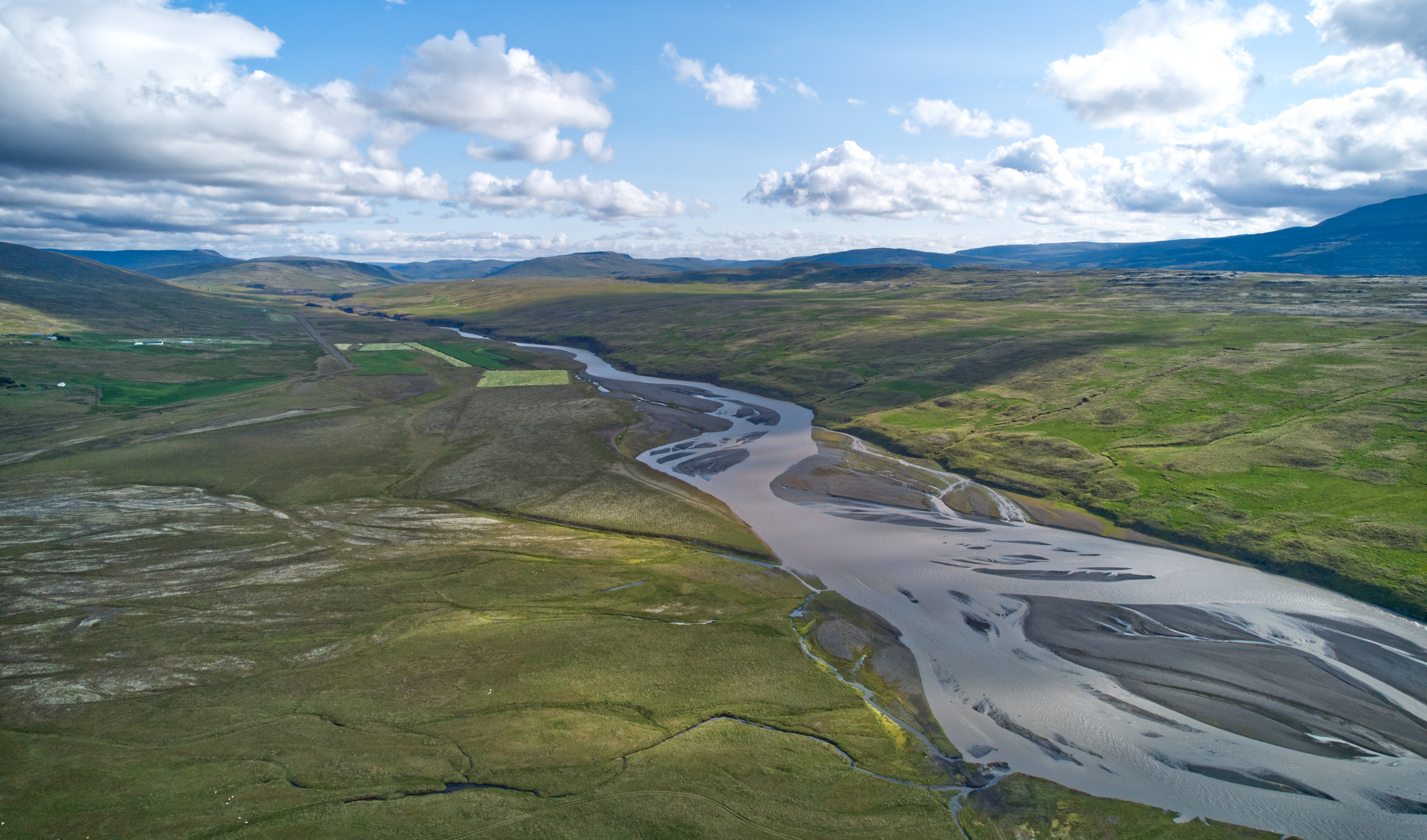
- Interactive map of Kjálki
- Coordinates: 65°24′23.177″N 19°8′18.650″W
- Country: Iceland
- County: Skagafjörður
- Farms: List: Kelduland, Flatatunga

Kjálki is a small district in Skagafjörður, Iceland. Kjálki is close to the Norðurá river, located along the Héraðsvötn up to Grjótárgil ravine, which is on the boundary of Kelduland in Kjálki and Stekkjarflati in Austurdalur. As of 2009, there were two inhabited farms in Kjálki, Kelduland and Flatatunga.
