= Flatatunga =

Farm in Skagafjörður, Iceland

- Farm
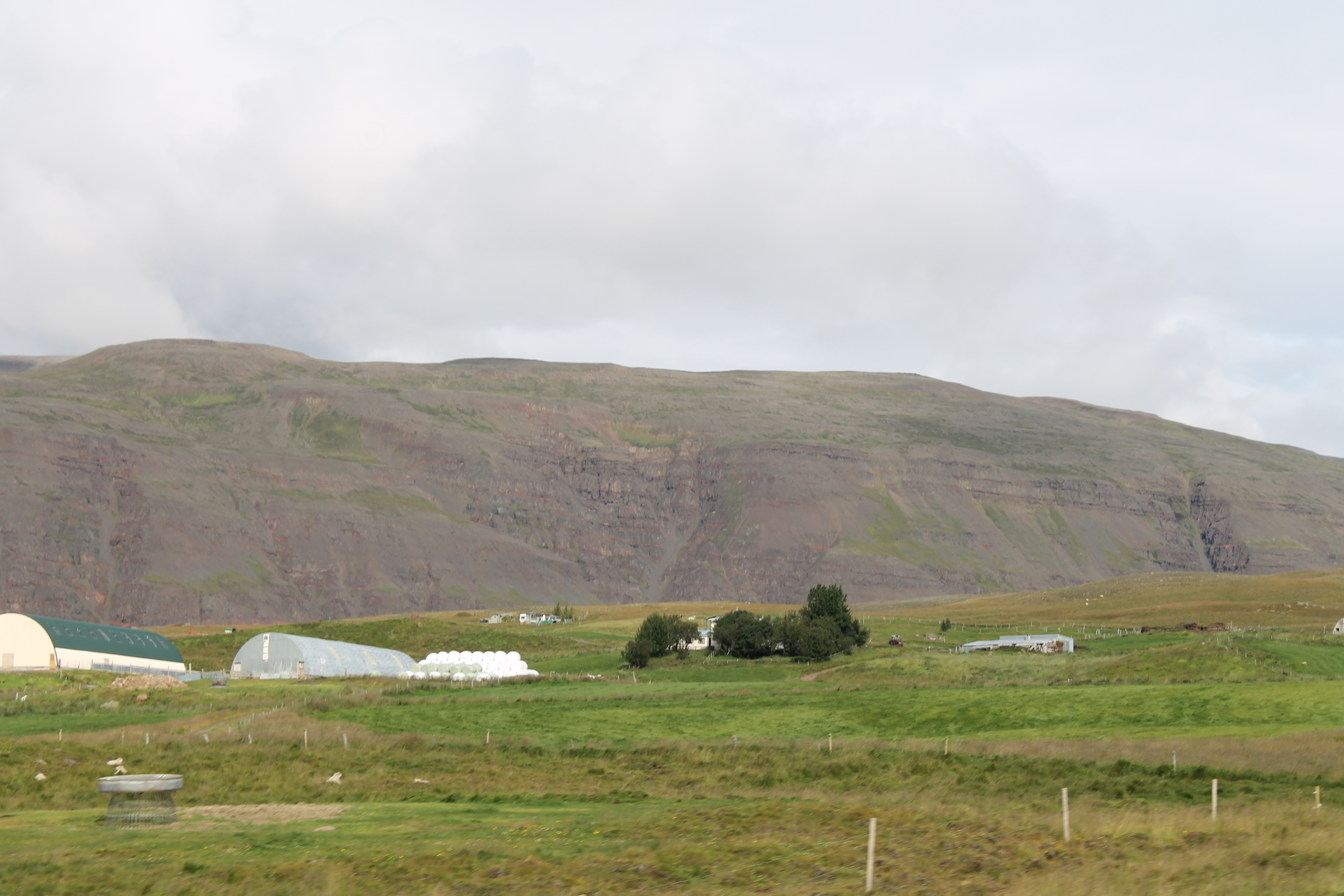
- The farm of Flatatunga
- Interactive map of Flatatunga
- Coordinates: 65°24′59.436″N 19°9′24.786″W
- Country: Iceland
- County: Skagafjörður (municipality)
- District: Kjálki
- Founded by: Tungu-Kári

Flatatunga is a farm in the Kjálki district of Skagafjörður, Iceland. The spit of land that the farm is named after was formed between the Héraðsvötn and Norðurá rivers. Flatatunga is the homestead of Tungu-Kári and an old, large farm.

== Flatatunga Boards ==
The Flatatunga Boards are carved wooden boards depicting apocalyptic scenes. According to Þórðar saga hreðu, in the 12th century, the boards in the lodge built by Þórður hreða ("the menace") Þórðarson in Flatatunga were carved with designs. Some of these boards, known as the Flatatunga Boards (or Flatatunga Planks) carved in the 12th century and now preserved at the National Museum of Iceland, came from that specific lodge. However, other boards in the collection are thought to have more likely originated from a church, probably Hólar Cathedral. Only a very few of the boards, which are part of a large artwork in the Byzantine style that depicts Judgement Day, have been preserved. In addition, a good many of the boards were lost when the storehouse in Flatatunga burned down in 1898.

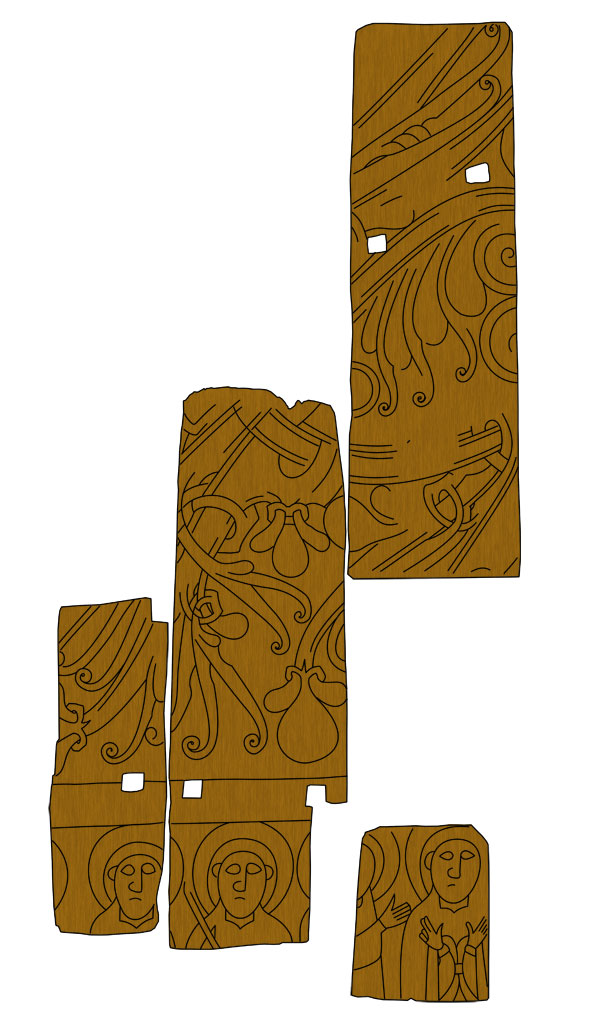
Illustrations of fragments of the Flatatunga boards

The Flatatunga boards are considered significant due to likely being the oldest images of their kind in the Nordic countries, and much has been written about them. Selma Jónsdóttir wrote her doctoral thesis, "An 11th-century Byzantine Last Judgement in Iceland" (Dómsdagurinn í Flatatungu, 1959), about the boards. Kristján Eldjárn wrote about them as well, and Hörður Ágústsson wrote the book Doomsday and Holy Men in Hólar (Dómsdagur og helgir menn á Hólum, 1989) about the boards.
