= Icelandic Meteorological Office =

Icelandic national meteorological service

Coordinates: 64°07′40″N 21°54′14″W

- Veðurstofa Íslands
- Logo since 2009

Agency overview
- Formed: 1 January 1920; 106 years ago
- Headquarters: Reykjavík, Iceland
- Employees: 160 (May 2026)
- Minister responsible: Jóhann Páll Jóhannsson, Minister of the Environment, Energy and Climate
- Agency executive: Hildigunnur H. H. Thorsteinsson, Director
- Website: en.vedur.is

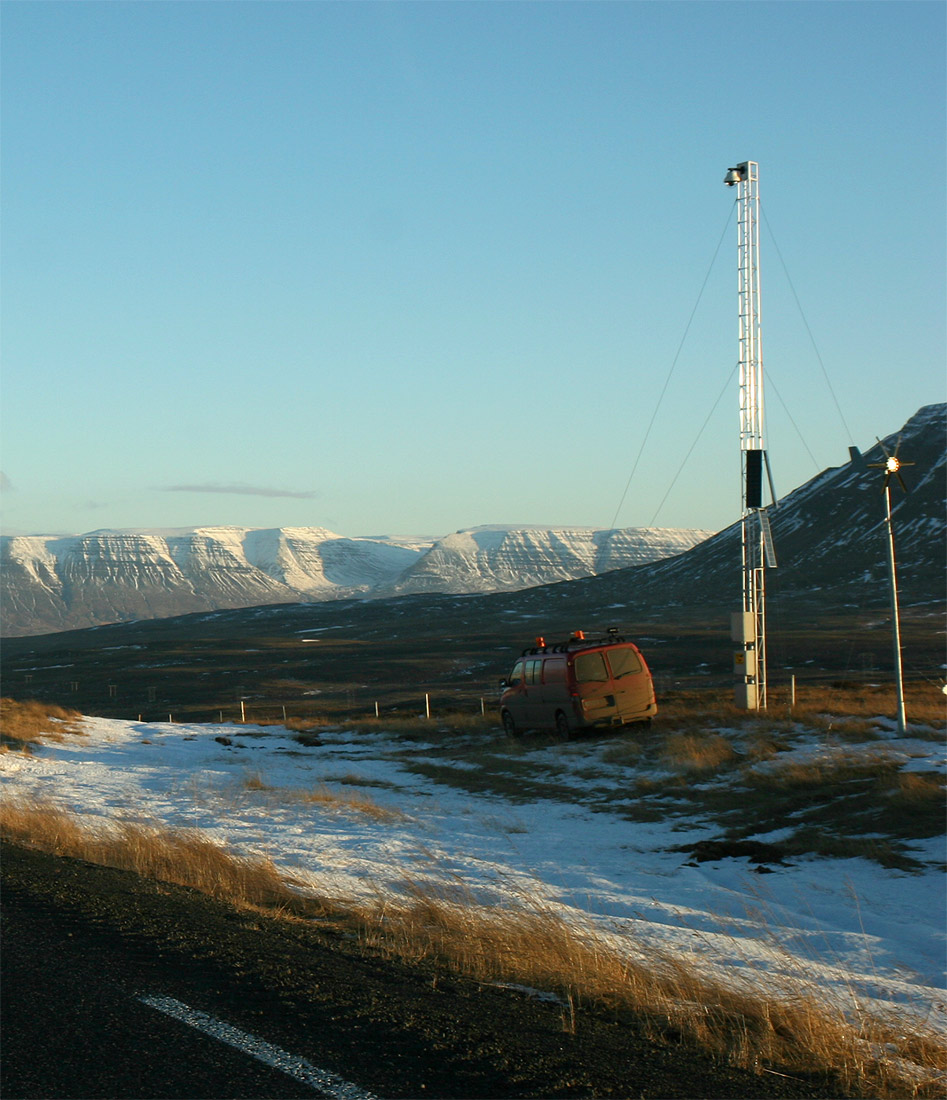
Vatnsskarð weather station, Skagafjörður, Iceland

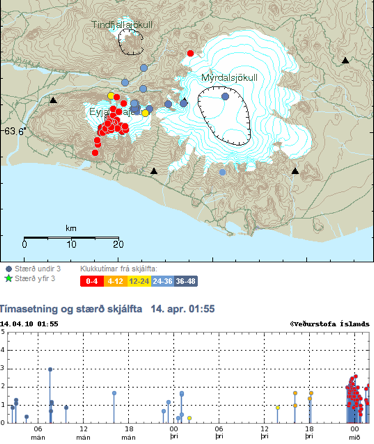
IMO quake map and diagram re. 2010 eruptions of Eyjafjallajökull

Icelandic Meteorological Office (IMO; Icelandic: Veðurstofa Íslands) is Iceland's national weather service and as such a government agency under the Ministry of Environment and Natural Resources. It is also active in volcano monitoring, esp. volcano seismology, and, together with other institutions, responsible for civil protection in Iceland

== Aims and functions ==
"The research focus of IMO is on weather and climate, atmospheric processes, glacier and avalanche studies, hydrological systems, earthquake and volcanic processes and geohazards. IMO also focuses on research in multi-parameter geophysical monitoring to develop more accurate forecasts of hazardous events. IMO has participated in several European and Nordic funded research projects, having the role of lead partner in many of them."An example is the FUTUREVOLC-Project.

== History of the institution ==
IMO was founded on 1 January 1920 as a solely meteorological institute. Til in 1925, it was part of another institution (Löggildingarstofa). Since then, it is an independent institution under the Ministry of Environment and Natural Resources.

From 2009 on, the Institution for Hydrology (Vatnamælingar) was integrated into IMO.

80 years after foundation, in the year 2000, a book was published about the history of the Icelandic Met Office (Hilmar Garðarsson: Saga Veðurstofu Íslands), 100 years after foundation, in 2020, a statue was erected for IMO.

== General directors ==
General directors of the institution are: Þorkell Þorkelsson (from 1920 to 1946), Teresía Guðmundsson (from 1946 to 1963), Hlynur Sigtryggsson (from 1963 to 1989), Páll Bergþórsson (from 1989 to 1993), Magnús Jónsson (from 1994 to 2008) and Árni Snorrason (since 2009).

== Equipment ==
From 2016, the Icelandic Veðurstofa manages a dual Cray XC30 system for the Danish Meteorological Institute as weather prediction, due to cheaper electricity and cooling. One is used for development, the other for daily operations.
