= Vatnsskarð =

Mountain pass between Húnavatnssýlsa and Skagafjörður, Iceland

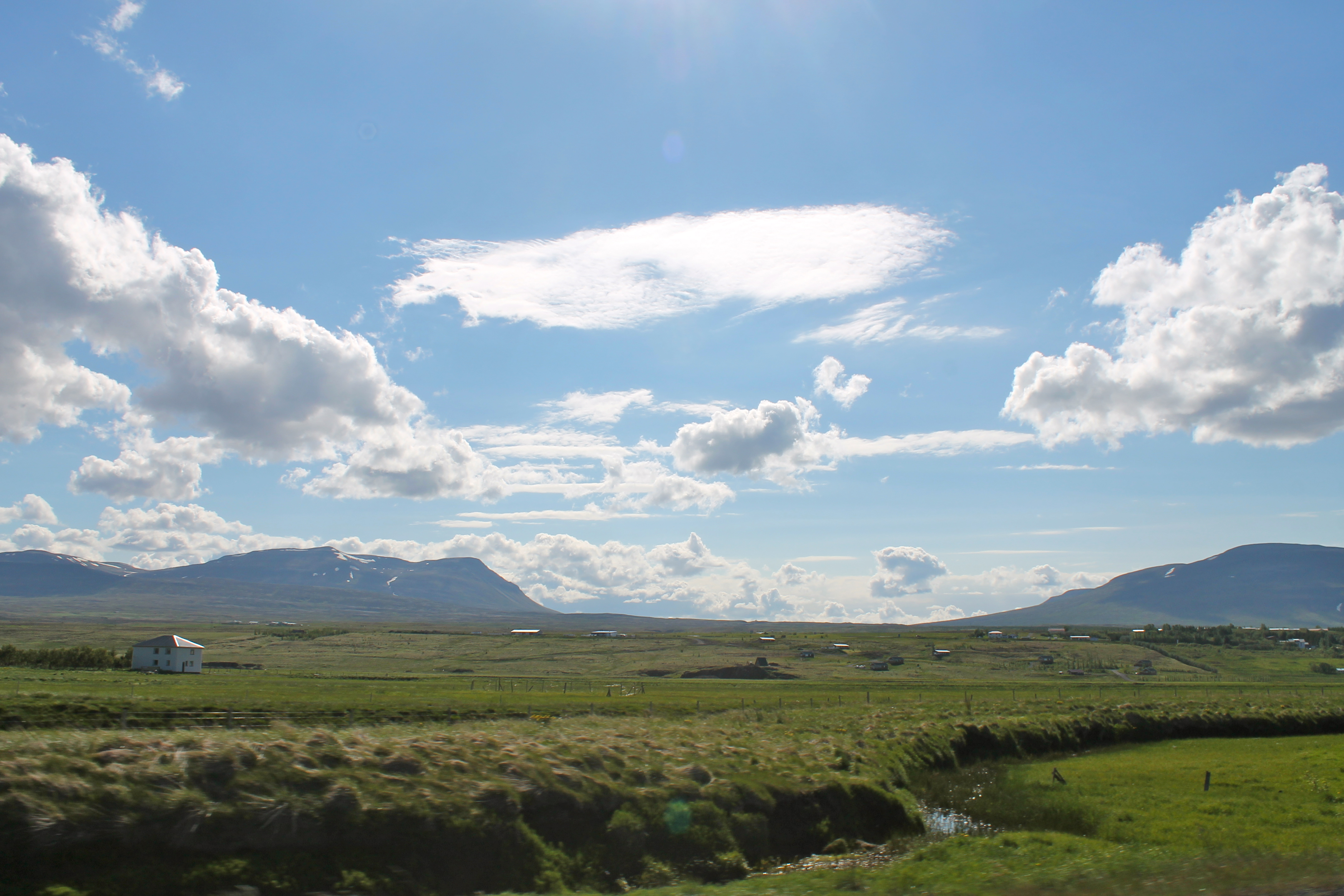
- Interactive map of Vatnsskarð
- Elevation: 420 meters

Third Approach
- Location: Between Húnavatnssýlsa and Skagafjörður Counties in Iceland
- Coordinates: 65°30′34.13″N 19°42′1.98″W

Vatnsskarð is a mountain pass between Húnavatnssýlsa and Skagafjörður Counties in Iceland. Route 1 uses it. There is a lake in the pass named Vatnshlíðarvatn, and the county border is just east of it. A stream (called Arnarvatnslækur or Sýslulækur) runs into the lake and it is on the county border.

== Geography ==
Grísafell is north of the pass and Valadalshnúkur peak is to the south. The Vatnsskarðsá river originates from Vatnshlíðarvatn lake and Valadalur valley, then runs eastward. The river falls in Gýgjarfoss waterfall east of the pass. When the river reaches Sæmundarhlíð, its name changes to Sæmundará river. There are only a few farms in Vatnsskarð and the surrounding area used to be referred to as á Skörðum or "in the pass".

The following farms were, or are still in Vatnsskarð

- Vatnshlíð (in Húnavatnssýsla county)
- Stóra-Vatnsskarð
- Valagerði
- Valadalur (abandoned)
- Valabjörg (abandoned)

== History ==
According to local legend, one time when the census was being taken, a vagabond named Magnús sálarháski ("distress of the soul")—about whom there are many stories—laid down right across the stream and stayed there all through the day of the census so it was not possible to count him in either Húnavatn or Skagafjörður counties.

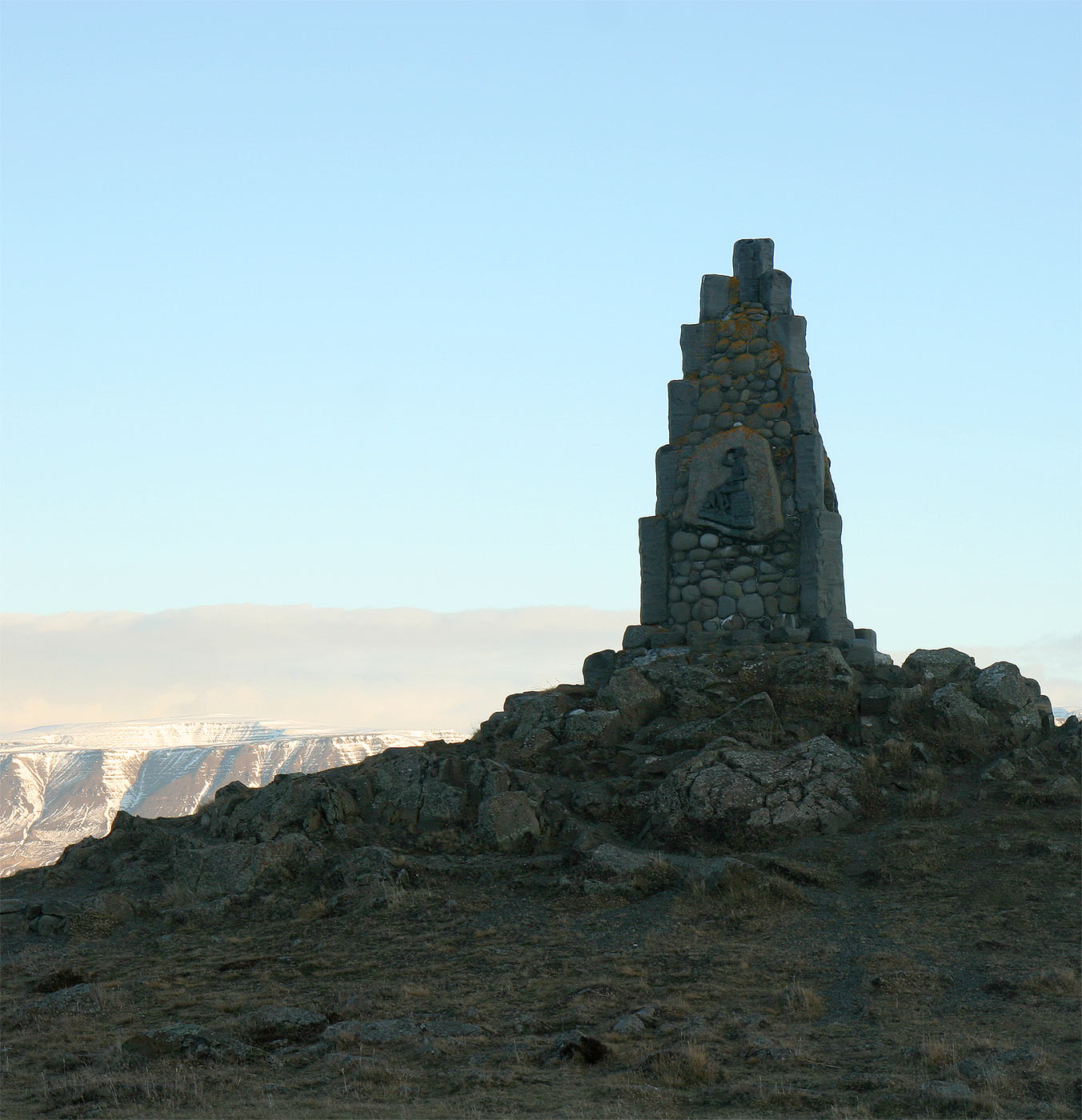
Monument to Stephan G. Stephanson

There is a monument to the poet Stephan G. Stephansson, who grew up in the area where the monument is now, on Arnarstapi hill on the eastern side of the pass. There are very good views over the region from the top of the hill Arnastapi, and there is a panoramic point just a short way from the monument.

Vatnsskarð is also the location of one of the Icelandic Meteorological Office's weather stations.

== Arnarstapi ==
Arnarstapi is a small hill on the eastern edge of Vatnsskarð. The hill is north of Víðimýrarsel, right next to the highway. Arnarstapi was mentioned in Þórðar saga hreðu, in which Þórður and Eindriði the helmsman fought. In Arnarstapi, Þórður fought six men and killed them all except for Eindriði who Þórður transported to the doctor to have his wounds treated after wounding Eindriði nearly to death.

Just below Arnarstapi is Brekkhús, a sheep shed belonging to Brekka. The house staff occasionally lived there and the poet Hjálmar Jónsson from Bóla died there in 1875.
