= Staðarfjöll =

Mountainous grazing land in Skagafjörður, Iceland

Coordinates: 65°38′14.622″N 19°43′43.846″W

Staðarfjöll is the name for grazing lands on the west side of Skagafjörður, Iceland between Sæmundarhlíð in the east and Laxárdalsfjall mountain in the west. The main part of Staðarfjöll used to belong to Reynistaður, which the area is named for, and it is sometimes called Reynistaðarfjöll (Reynistaður mountains). It is now part of the Staðarfjöll plain and is owned by several municipalities in western Skagafjörður.

Multiple valleys run through Staðarfjöll. Víðidalur valley is in the westernmost part of Staðarfjöll and it is around 15 kilometers long, running mostly from north to south. Hryggjadalur valley is northeast of Víðidalur and its outermost part belongs to Staðarfjöll. Háheiði, a mountainous area, is east of Víðidalur and around 10 kilometers long. East of Háheiði are smaller valleys: Rangali and Miðdalur in the north, then Vatnadalur and Valbrandsdalur, and Þröngidalur in the south. To the east, there are the Sæmundarhlíð mountains and north of those, there is Staðaröxl, a mountain overlooking Staðarfjöll.

== Víðidalur ==
One of Staðarfjöll's valleys is Víðidalur. It is a deserted valley on the border between Skagafjörður and Austur-Húnavatnssýsla counties. The valley runs approximately north to south and is just over 15 kilometers long. For the most part, the valley is 250–320 meters above sea level and rather wide, and some areas of the valley floor have lots of vegetation.

Víðidalur was considerably settled in the Middle Ages and one of the farms there, Helgastaðir, even had a church. There was no mention of Helgastaðir in the historical record until a letter from the scholar Björn Jónsson from Skarðsá from the middle of the 17th century. It is uncertain when Víðidalur became abandoned, which may have been the result of a wave of plague that afflicted the whole valley. The valley is now completely abandoned, likely because of the Black Death in 1402 or the second plague during 1495–1496. Afterwards, there were usually only one or two farms left in the area. The Staðarfjöll ridges, which are in Hryggjadalur valley, became abandoned in 1913. Gvendarstaðir, in the very north of the valley and—for the longest time—the only farm in Hryggjadalur, was abandoned in 1898.

There are ruins and hay fields of some of the farms still visible, including: Þverá, Svartagil, Rauðagil, Þúfnavellir, Helgastaðir, Hrafnagil, and possibly Atlastaðir.

The Skagafjörður Travel Association now has a lodge in Þúfnavellir in Víðidalur.
