= Eilífur Örn Atlason =

Ninth century Icelandic settler

Eilífur örn Atlason
- Occupation: Explorer
- Children: Sólmundur Eilífsson; Atli Eilífsson; Eysteinn Eilífsson; Koðran Eilífsson; Þjóðólfur

Eilífur örn Atlason (c. 880) was a viking explorer and Norwegian colonist who founded a settlement in Skagafjörður, Iceland. There is debate surrounding where specifically he settled. Laxárdalur is a probable location, but Gönguskörð, Reykjaströnd, and Mánaþúfu—a name lost to time that has not been able to be connected to any modern location—have also been suggested. Eilífur was the son of Atli Skíðason (c. 840) and the brother of another colonist, Þorkell vingnir Atlason (c. 860). He is mentioned in Ljósvetninga saga, Njáls saga, and Kristni saga.

== Legacy ==
Eilífur produced two sons with his first wife Þórlaug Sæmundsdóttir (born 900), daughter of Sæmundur suðureyski: Atli Eilífsson and Sólmundur Eilífsson.

With his second wife, Þorbjörg Hrafnsdóttir (born 899) of Norway, he had three sons: Þjóðólfur (born 926), Eysteinn Eilífsson, and Koðran Eilífsson.
