= Miklavatn (Skagafjörður) =

Lake in Skagafjörður, Iceland

- Miklavatn í Borgarsveit, Víkin
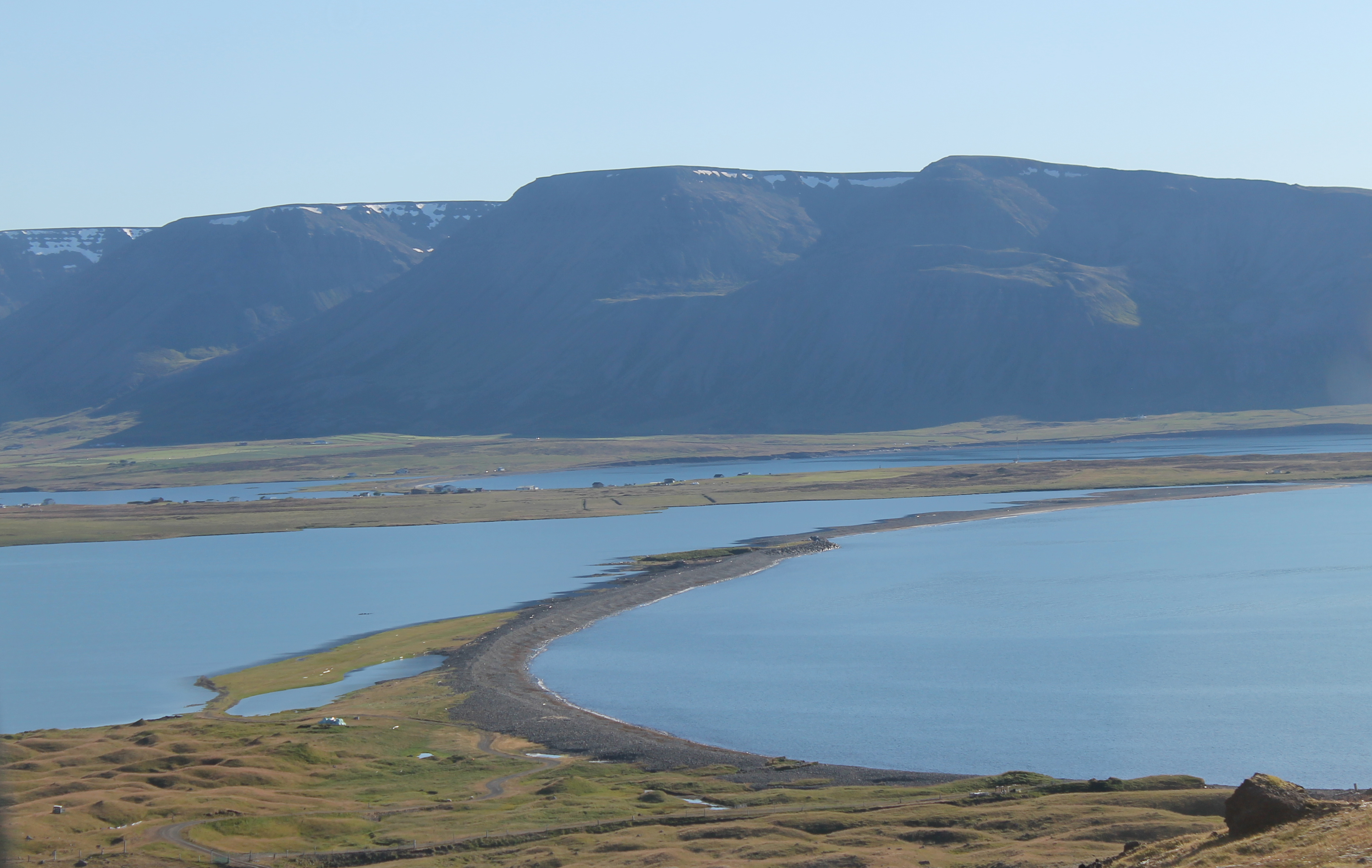
- Miklavatn, towards the west
- Interactive map of Miklavatn
- Location: Skagafjörður, Iceland
- Coordinates: 65°42′05″N 19°34′35″W
- Primary outflows: Héraðsvötn
- Settlements: Borgarsveit

Miklavatn in Borgarsveit is a lake in Skagafjörður, Iceland, near the head of the west side of the fjord. The lake is oblong and lies parallel to the western Héraðsvötn, narrowing slightly in the north. From the northern end, there is runoff into the Héraðsvötn. It is called Víkin, and to the north is the southern end of the Sauðárkrókur Airport.

The area around Miklavatn consists of extensive wetlands with lots of bird life, and the area became a nature reserve in 1977. Traffic in the area is prohibited from May 15 through July 1 every year. The region is registered with BirdLife International as an internationally important bird area.
