= Öxnadalsheiði =

Plateau in Skagafjörður, Iceland

- Plateau
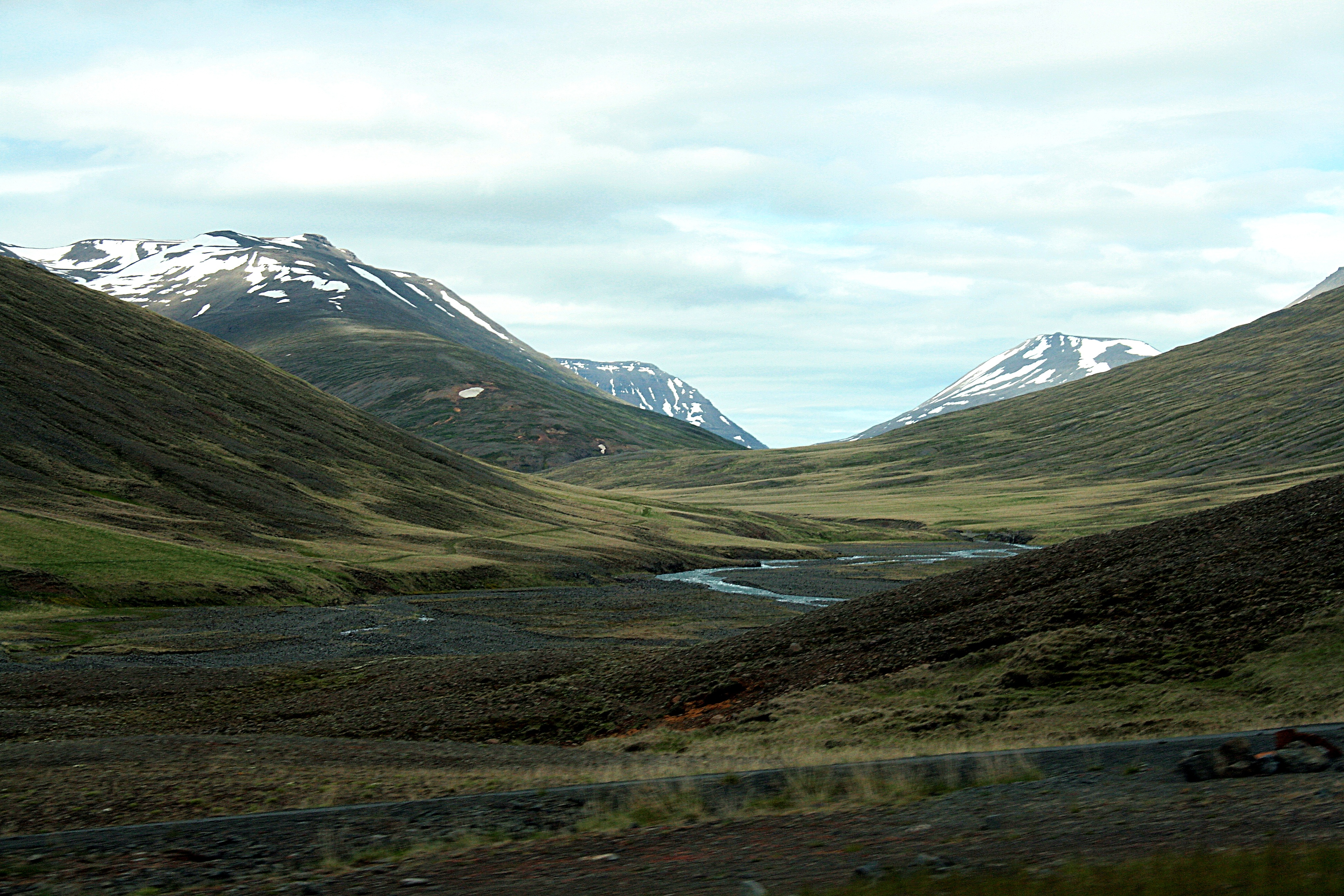
- Öxnadalsheiði
- Interactive map of Öxnadalsheiði
- Coordinates: 65°28′16.338″N 18°40′56.201″W
- Elevation: 540 m (1,770 ft)

Öxnadalsheiði is a plateau (which includes a valley of the same name) in between Norðurárdalur in Skagafjörður and Öxnadalur in Eyjafjörður, Iceland. Route 1 between Skagafjörður and Akureyri goes through the plateau, which is quite snowy and used to be a difficult route to travel.

== Geography ==
The road through Öxnadalsheiði has, at its highest point, an altitude of 540 meters above sea level and, as such, is the second-highest point on Route 1 after Möðrudalur wilderness (in the highlands of north-eastern Iceland). The plateau is narrow towards the west, in Giljareit and Skógahlíð, where the Heiðará river runs through a huge, deep gorge along the road. The river widens towards the east where the border between Skagafjörður and Eyjafjörður counties is, along the Grjótá river. Overlooking the Grjótá is Grjótárhnjúkur, a 1237-meter-tall mountain, to the west of which is located Tryppaskál, overlooking the river in the basin of the ravine, where nearly 30 horses were driven off a cliff in 1870. Their bones are still visible in the basin. Ruins of two farms were found on the plateau. These farms became abandoned sometime in the 13th century.

There was, for a period of time, a mountain house named Sesseljubúð on the plateau around the basin.
