= Hrafnagil =

- Village
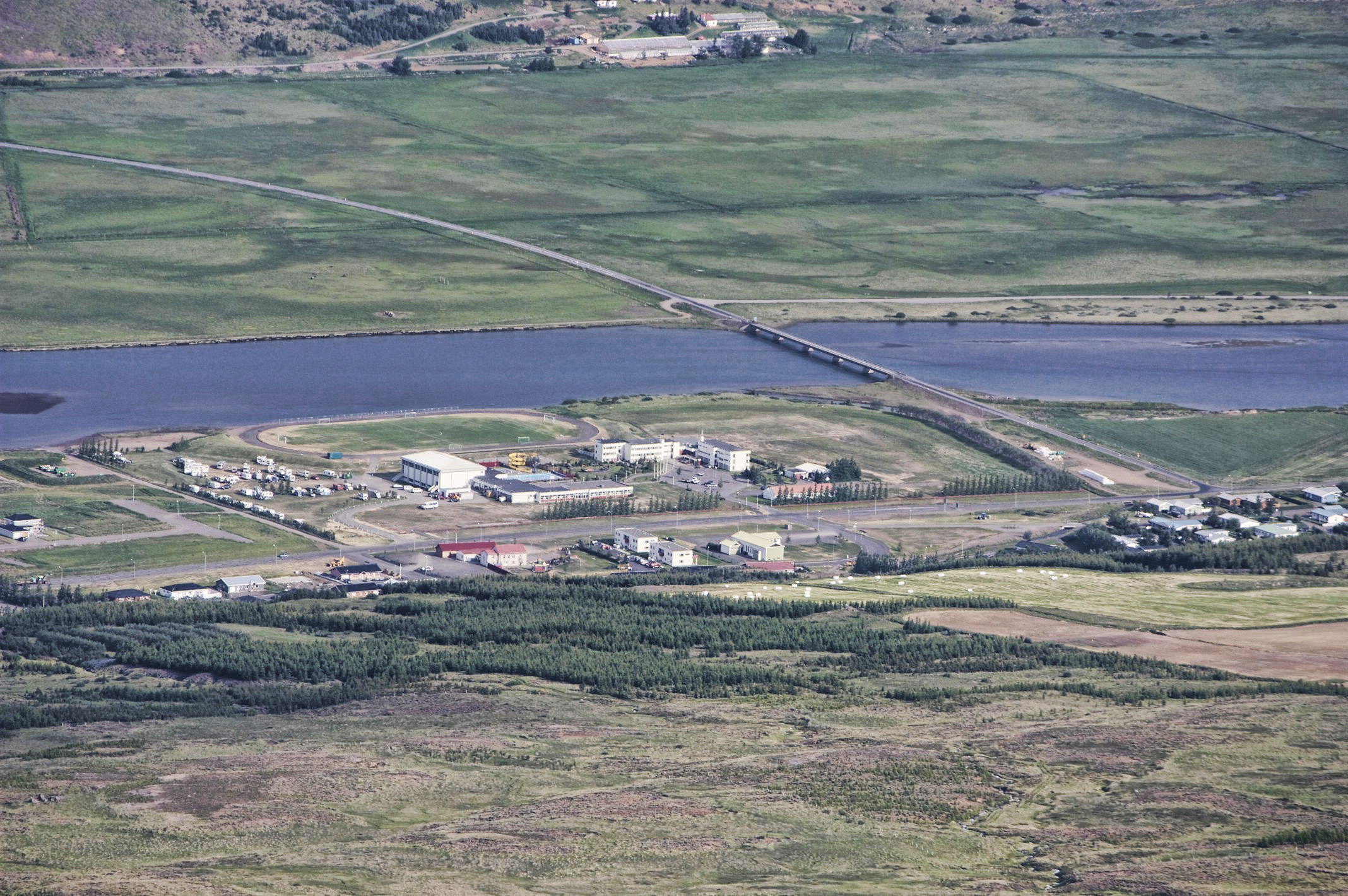

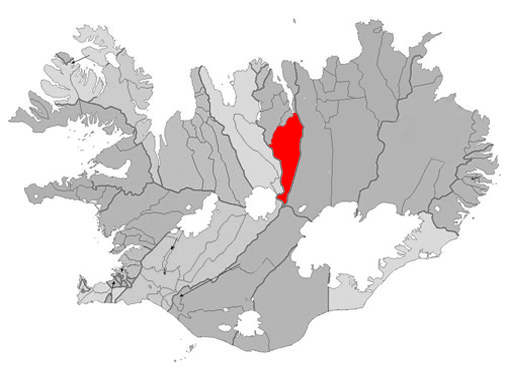
- Location of the Municipality of Eyjafjarðarsveit

- Location of Hrafnagil
- Coordinates: 65°34′25″N 18°05′38″W
- Country: Iceland
- Constituency: Northeast Constituency
- Region: Northeastern Region
- Municipality: Eyjafjarðarsveit

Population (2016)
  - Total: 260
- Postal code: 601
- Website: Official website

Hrafnagil (Icelandic pronunciation: [ˈr̥apnaˌcɪːl̥], also known as Hrafnagilshverfi [ˈr̥apnaˌcɪlsˌkʰvɛrvɪ] and formerly Reykárhverfi [ˈreiːkˌaurˌkʰvɛrvɪ]) is a small village in Eyjafjarðarsveit, northern Iceland, which in 2016 had 260 inhabitants.

The village has a school and a community center. The area has access to high-temperature geothermal heat, which is used to heat houses and greenhouses.
