= Norðurárdalur =

Valley in Skagafjörður, Iceland

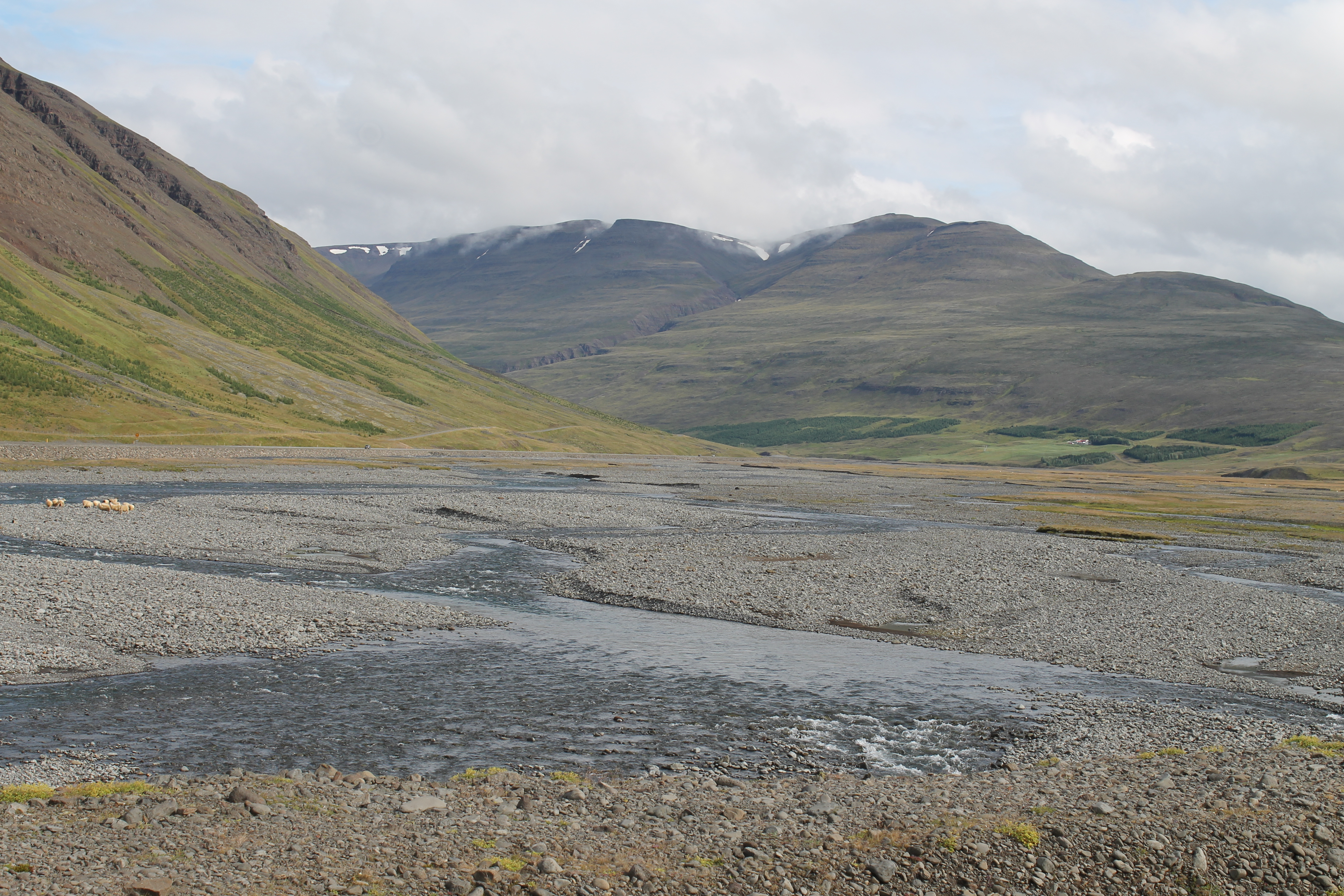
- The Norðurá river in Norðurárdalur
- Long-axis direction: east-west

Naming
- English translation: North river valley, from the Icelandic norður (north), á (river), and dalur (valley)

Geography
- Country: Iceland
- State/Province: Skagafjörður
- District: Akrahreppur
- Population centers: Silfrastaðir, Fremri-Kot, Egilsá
- Coordinates: 65°25′57.00″N 19°2′45.49″W 65°27′13.835″N 18°58′0.743″W
- River: Norðurá
- Interactive map of Norðurárdalur

Norðurárdalur (North River Valley) is a valley in eastern Skagafjörður, Iceland bordered by the Bóluá river, which forms the boundary between Blönduhlíð and Norðurárdalur. Route 1 runs through the valley up to the Öxnadalsheiði plateau.

The valley runs east-southeast and shortly after curves to the northeast. Its northern side, at the start of the valley near Bólugil ravine, is called Silfrastaðafjall mountain and, further on, takes the name Kotaheiði as it approaches the Valgagilsá river. From that point on, it is known as Silfrastaðaafréttur highland pasture. The valley previously belonged to Silfrastaðir, but it is now the property of Akrahreppur. Moving south into the valley features the Krókárgerðisfjall mountain, then the Borgargerðisfjall mountain, and finally Virkishnjúkur peak at the mouth of the valley, which is the furthest from Norðurárdalur. West of Virkishnjúkur peak, there is a deep tributary valley whose northern mountainside belongs to Egilsdalur valley, while the southern is part of Tungudalur valley, and then crosses into Kjálki.

There is some lowland in the valley, although with the smallest amount around the middle, where Norðurá river runs through extensive sandbanks, and the river's bows curve around the sandbanks in several places. Many tributaries flow into it, including the Kotaá, Valagilsá, Króká, and Egilsá rivers. Some rivers, especially Valagilsá, could pose as serious obstacles for travelers before there were bridges. The valley has nice weather and excellent plant coverage. Great reforestation efforts have begun at Silfrastaðafjall mountain. In recent years, over a million trees have been planted there.

On July 6, 1954, there were large landslides following a heavy rainstorm that lasted 24 hours and caused extensive damage, especially at Fremri-Kot, where a landslide came to a standstill right above a residence; and at Ytri-Kot, which was already abandoned.

At most there were seven farms in the Norðurárdalur area, but only three remain: Fremri-Kot, Egilsá, and Silfrastaðir. Egilsá became abandoned in 2009, but was inhabited again in 2010. For a long time, a summer residence for children operated there. It later was also used as a boarding school for mentally disabled teenagers.

== Farms in Norðurárdalur ==
Inhabited:

- Silfrastaðir
- Fremri-Kot
- Egilsá

Abandoned:

- Borgargerði (abandoned in 1974)
- Ytri-Kot (abandoned in 1952)
- Krókárgerði (abandoned in 1898)
- Hálfdanartungur (abandoned in 1876)

Historical farms:

- Ausugerði (abandoned around 1670)
- Skeljungsskáli
- Bessakot
- Ketilsstaðir (abandoned in 1690)
- Haukagil/Grund
- Blómsturvellir
- Vík
- Henglastaðir
- Gerði
- Smáaland
- Bygggerði

== Bibliography ==
- Hjalti Pálsson (editor): Byggðasaga Skagafjarðar, volume IV. Akrahreppur. Sögufélag Skagfirðinga, 2007. ISBN 978-9979-861-15-7
