= Norðurá (Skagafjörður) =

River in Skagafjörður, Iceland

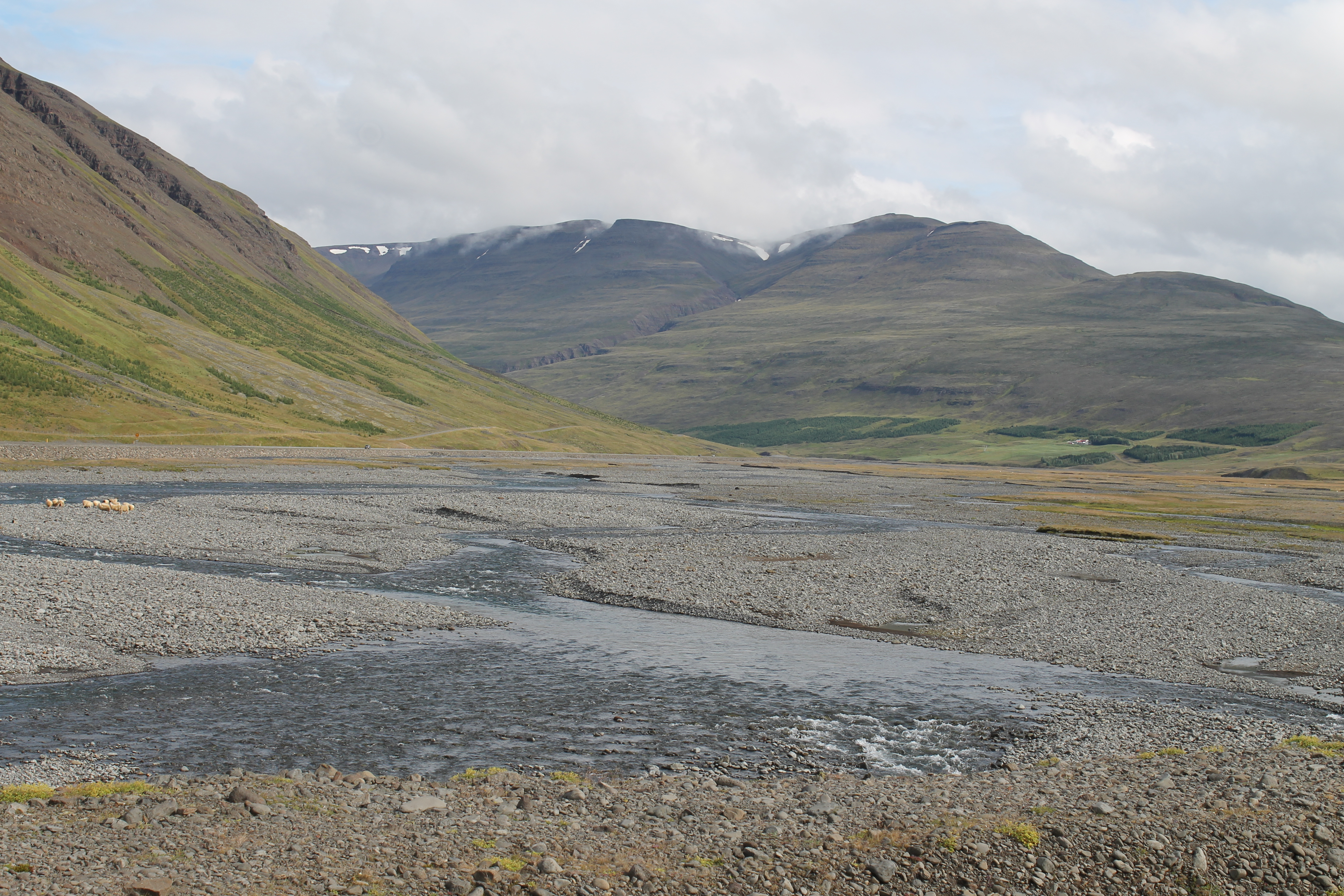
- Etymology: "Northern river." Norður means "north" and á means "river."

Location
- Country: Iceland
- County: Skagafjörður (municipality)
- Region: Skagafjörður

Physical characteristics
- Source
  - coordinates: 65°27′11.056″N 18°58′24.924″W
- Mouth: Héraðsvötn
  - coordinates: 65°26′N 19°11′W

Norðurá is a river that runs the length of Norðurárdalur valley in Skagafjörður, Iceland, where it creates extensive sandbars on the valley floor. The river joins the Héraðsvötn below Flatatunga. Many tributaries flow into the Norðurá, some located in massive ravines, including Kotá, Valagilsá, Horná, Heiðará, Grjótá, Króká, Egilsá, Stóralækur rivers.
