= Eyjafjarðarsveit =

- Municipality
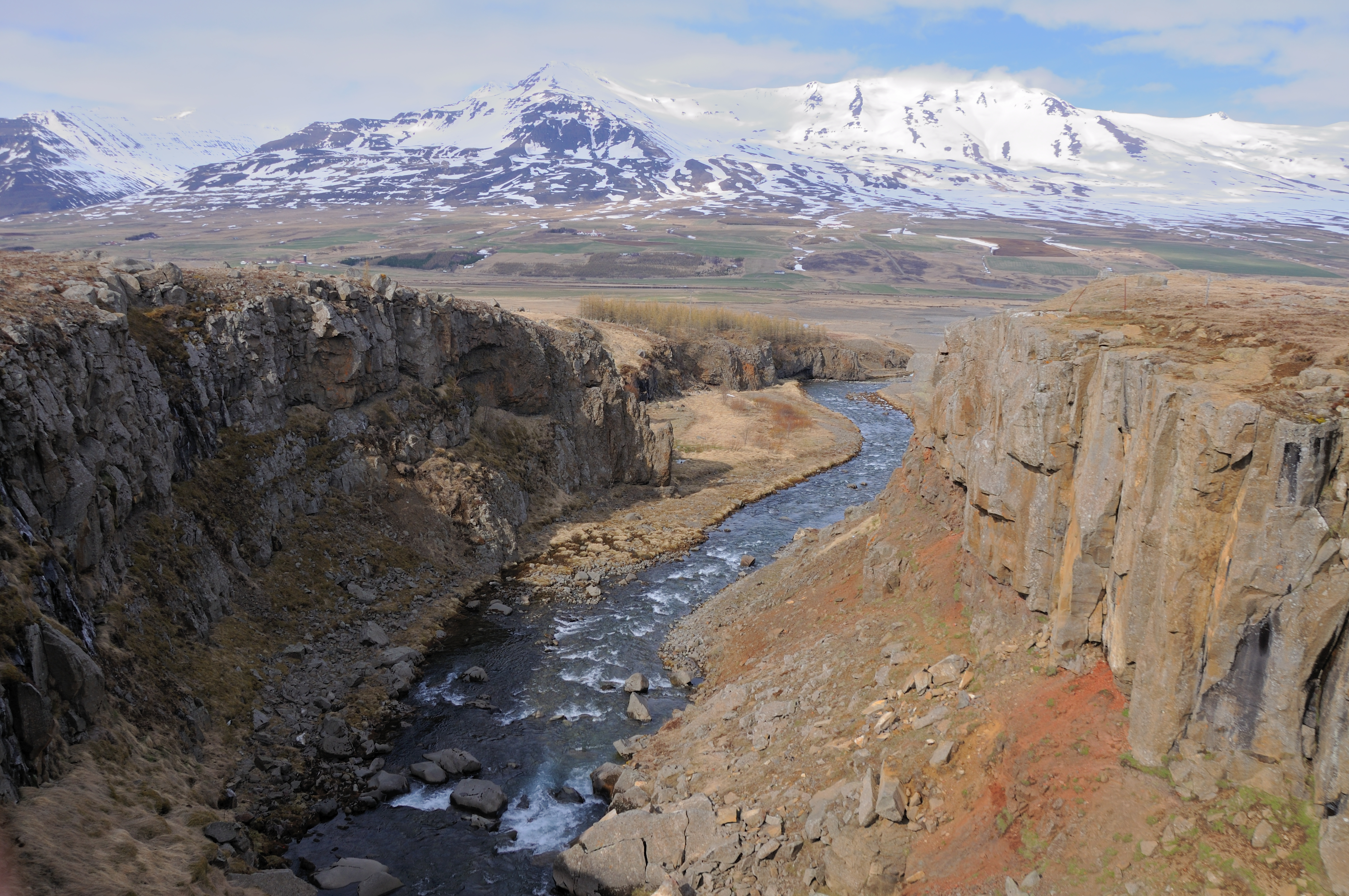
- Skyline of Eyjafjarðarsveit

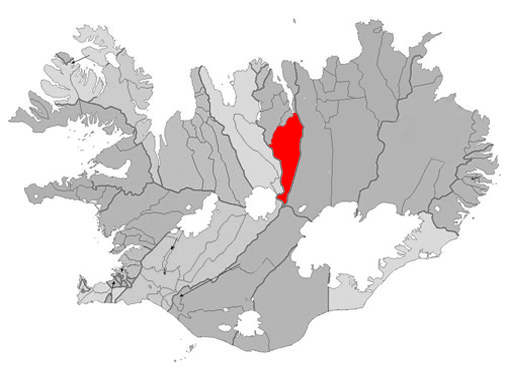
- Location of Eyjafjarðarsveit

- Location within Iceland
- Coordinates: 65°34′22.8″N 18°5′42″W
- Country: Iceland
- Region: Northeastern Region
- Constituency: Northeast Constituency

Government
  - Manager: Karl Frímannsson

Area
  - Total: 1,775 km^{2} (685 sq mi)

Population
  - Total: 1,026
  - Density: 0.58/km^{2} (1.5/sq mi)
- Municipal number: 6513
- Website: esveit.is

Eyjafjarðarsveit (Icelandic pronunciation: [ˈeiːjaˌfjarðarˌsveiːt]) is a municipality located in northern Iceland.

Most of Eyjafjarðarsveit is located inland, but the northern tip borders a fjord. The major villages are Hrafnagil and Öngulsstaðir [ˈœyŋkʏlsˌstaːðɪr̥].
