= Reynistaður =

Town in Skagafjörður, Iceland

- Town
- Interactive map of Reynistaður
- Coordinates: 65°39′24″N 19°33′47″W
- Country: Iceland
- County: Skagafjörður (municipality)
- Time zone: UTC+0

Reynistaður, previously Staður í Reynisnesi ("Site in Reynisnes"), is a town in Skagafjörður, Iceland. Reynistaður is the location of an old manor. Þorfinnur karlsefni ("the makings of a man") was from Reynistaður and lived there for some time with his wife, Guðríður Þorbjarnardóttir after they returned from Vinland. During the Age of the Sturlungs, it was one of the residences of the Ásbirningar family clan. Kolbeinn kaldaljós ("cold light") Arnórsson, also called Staðar-Kolbeinn, lived there as did his son Brandur Kolbeinsson later on.

Gissur Þorvaldsson later acquired Reynistaður, which was said to have become the jarl's residence because Gissur had received the title of jarl. Gissur donated Reynistaður for the establishment of a convent. He died in 1268, but the Reynistaður Abbey was not established until 1295; it operated until the Reformation. Although the abbey was eventually closed down, the nuns received permission to live out the rest of their days there. No artifacts or other visible relics from the abbey have been found in Reynistaður, but there are other place names that link to the abbey.

The abbey acquired a number of estates that the king came into possession of after the Reformation, which his representatives, called abbey magistrates, were in charge of supervising. Many of them lived in Reynistaður, including:

- Oddur Gottskálksson, lawyer
- Sigurður Jónsson (died 1602) and his son Jón Sigurðsson (died 1635), a lawyer
- Jens Spendrup, sýslumaður (sheriff)
- Halldór Vídalín Bjarnason and father of the Reynistaður brothers, who lived in Reynistaður from 1768 to 1800 and whose widow, Ragnheiður Einarsdóttir, was the abbey magistrate from 1803 to 1814
- Einar Stefánsson, a student and grandfather of the poet Einar Benediktsson

When Reynistaður's old barn was torn down in 1935, the barn door, which was built in the typical 18th century stave construction, was kept in place. The door was later moved and a concrete structure was built around it. In 1999, a gate was built near the original location of the barn, turf walls were added, and the roof was also covered in turf. It is now a heritage site held by the National Museum of Iceland.

There has been a church in Reynistaður from the time the town was founded, and the existing church, which is made of wood, was consecrated in 1870. The church is now a protected site. It is said that the jarl Gissur is buried under the church floor.
