= List of valleys of Iceland =

This is a list of valleys of Iceland.

== A ==
- Aðaldalur
- Austurdalur
- Austurárdalur
- Árnabotn

== B ==
- Bárðardalur
- Bleiksmýrardalur
- Blöndudalur
- Botnsdalur (Hvalfirði)
- Botnsdalur (Súgandafirði)
- Böðvarsdalur
- Breiðdalur
- Brynjudalur
- Búrfellsdalur (Snæfellsnesi)

== D ==
- Dalsmynni (við Eyjafjörð)
- Deildardalur
- Djúpidalur (Eyjafirði)

== E ==
- Eilífsdalur
- Elliðaárdalur
- Endalausidalur
- Eyjafjarðardalur

== F ==
- Fagridalur
- Flateyjardalsheiði
- Flateyjardalur
- Fljótsdalur
- Flókadalur (Borgarfirði)
- Flókadalur (Skagafjörður)
- Flugustaðadalur
- Fnjóskadalur
- Fossárdalur (Berufirði)
- Fossvogsdalur

== G ==
- Geithellnadalur
- Geldingadalir
- Glerárdalur
- Gljúfurleit
- Grágæsadalur
- Grændalur
- Gönguskörð

== H ==
- Haukadalur (Bláskógabyggð)
- Haukadalur (Dalabyggð)
- Haukadalur (Ísafjarðarbær)
- Heljardalur
- Herjólfsdalur
- Hítardalur (dalur)
- Hjaltadalur
- Hnappadalur
- Hofsárdalur
- Hörgárdalur
- Hrafnkelsdalur
- Hraundalur
- Hrolleifsdalur

== I ==
- Ingjaldssandur

== J ==
- Jökuldalur

== K ==
- Kaldidalur
- Kálfafellsdalur
- Ketildalir
- Kolbeinsdalur

== L ==
- Langidalur (Húnaþingi)
- Langidalur (Vestfjörðum)
- Laxárdalur (Austur-Húnavatnssýslu)
- Laxárdalur (Skagafjöður)
- Leirdalsheiði
- Línakradalur
- Lundarreykjadalur

== M ==
- Meradalir
- Miðfjarðardalir
- Morsárdalur
- Mosfellsdalur
- Myrkárdalur
- Mýrdalur

== N ==
- Nátthagi
- Norðurárdalur (Borgarfirði)
- Norðurárdalur (Húnaþingi)
- Norðurárdalur (Skagafjörður)
- Norðurdalur (Breiðdal)
- Norðurdalur (Héraði)
- Núpsdalur

== O ==
- Oddsdalur
- Otradalur
- Ólafsdalur
- Öxnadalur

== R ==
- Reykholtsdalur
- Reykjadalur (Þingeyjarsýslu)
- Reykjadalur (Ölfusi)
- Rugludalur

== S ==
- Selárdalur
- Selárdalur (Vopnafirði)
- Seldalur
- Seljalandsdalur
- Seljalandsdalur (Álftafirði)
- Skíðadalur
- Skjaldfannardalur
- Skjóldalur
- Skorradalur
- Skriðdalur
- Snædalur
- Sölvadalur
- Steinadalur (Ströndum)
- Suðurdalur (Breiðdal)
- Suðurdalur (Héraði)
- Svarfaðardalur
- Svartárdalur
- Svartárdalur (Austur-Húnavatnssýslu)
- Svínadalur
- Syðridalur

== T ==
- Tungudalur

== U ==
- Unadalur

== V ==
- Vatnsdalur
- Vesturárdalur
- Vesturdalur
- Víðidalur (Húnaþingi)
- Víðidalur (Reykjavík)
- Víðidalur (Skagafirði)

== Þ ==
- Þorgrímsstaðadalur
- Þórisdalur
- Þjórsárdalur
