= Bær (Höfðaströnd) =

Farm in Skagafjörður, Iceland

Bær Bær á Höfðaströnd
- Farm
- Interactive map of Bær
- Country: Iceland
- County: Skagafjörður (municipality)
- District: Höfðaströnd

Bær is a farm in Höfðaströnd on the eastern side of Skagafjörður, Iceland, just north of Hofsós. Bær owns the coastal land between Hof in Höfðaströnd and Höfðavatn, and half of Þórðarhöfði across from Höfði as well as Bæjarmöl, south of the isthmus that connects the headland and the shore. Bær also has fishing rights in Höfðavatn among other holdings around the lake.

Down past Bær’s field are Bæjarklettar and Bæjarvík cove, where there used to be an excellent landing that was used as a fishing access point. For a long time, there were a number of workman's cottages there, and the people who lived there primarily supported themselves with fishing. In the mid-19th century, a few houses were also built along Höfðavatn on Bær’s land, and the residents lived on what they could hunt. This made Bær, for a long time, one of the largest ports for fishing on Skagafjörður. The settlement became abandoned after harbor facilities were built in Hofsós and people moved there instead.
