= Ásgrímur Magnússon =

17th-century Icelandic poet

- Died: 1679; Kvíabekkur in Ólafsfjörður
- Occupation: Poet
- Notable work: Rímur af Víglundi og Ketilríði, Grýlukvæði
- Spouse: Þóra Erlendsdóttir Þuríður Jónsdóttir
- Children: Sigríður Ásgrímsdóttir Valgerður Herdís Erlendur

Ásgrímur Magnússon (died 1679) was a poet and farmer in North Iceland. He farmed for many years at Höfði in Höfðaströnd but eventually moved to Kvíabekkur in Ólafsfjörður, where he died.

Ásgrímur Magnússon's first wife was Þóra Erlendsdóttir, sister of fellow poet Guðmundur Erlendsson of Fell in Sléttuhlíð. Þóra died as a young woman. They had at least one child, Sigríður Ásgrímsdóttir (c. 1626–after 1703). After Þóra's death, Ásgrímur married Þuríður Jónsdóttir. Their children were Valgerður (1636–1706), Herdís (1638–after 1709) and Erlendur (c. 1644–after 1705).

Ásgrímur composed rímur poetry and is believed to have co-composed Grýlukvæði in c. 1640 with his brother-in-law Guðmundur Erlendsson. Ásgrímur is a speaker in the poem, in which Grýla visits his home at Höfði at Christmas and threatens to steal his young daughters, Valka (Valgerður) and Herdís. His Rímur af Víglundi og Ketilríði have survived in several manuscripts, including AM 142 8vo, which is a copy of Ásgrímur's autograph manuscript.
