= Hofsá (Skagafjörður) =

River in Skagafjörður, Iceland

Hofsá Unadalsá
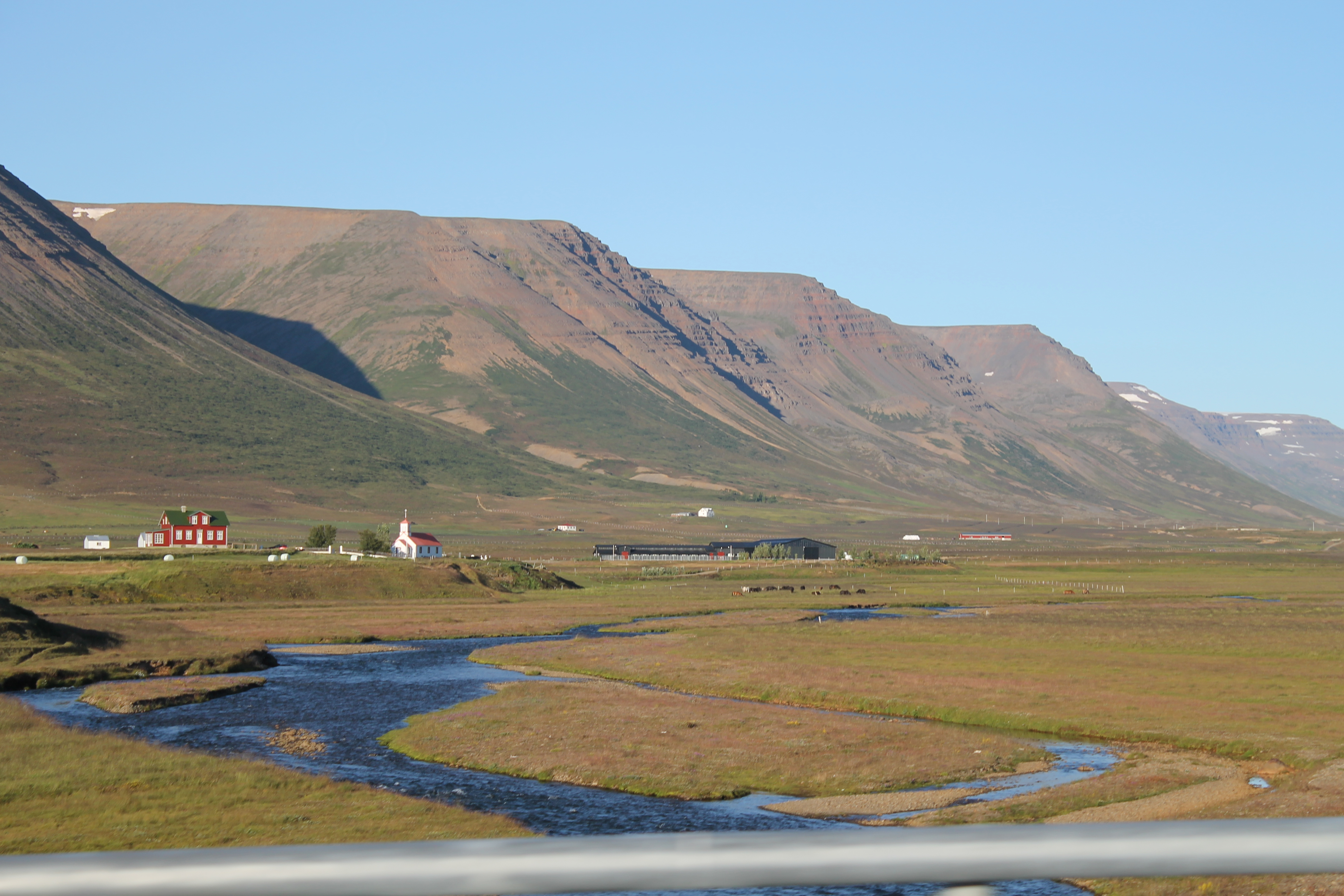
- Hofsá running past Hof
- Etymology: "Hofsá" translates to "Temple River"

Location
- Country: Iceland
- County: Skagafjörður

Physical characteristics
- Source: Unadalsá river in Unadalur
- Mouth
  - coordinates: 65°54′3.04″N 19°22′21.16″W

Basin features
- Cities: Hof, Hofsós

The Hofsá river is a spring creek in Höfðaströnd in Skagafjörður, Iceland. The river originates from Unadalur where it is called the Unadalsá river. When it leaves the mouth of the valley, its name changes to Hofsá. It leads up to flat meadows where it meanders past the church site Hof and continues on to the sea at Hofsós.
