= Grafará =

River in Skagafjörður, Iceland

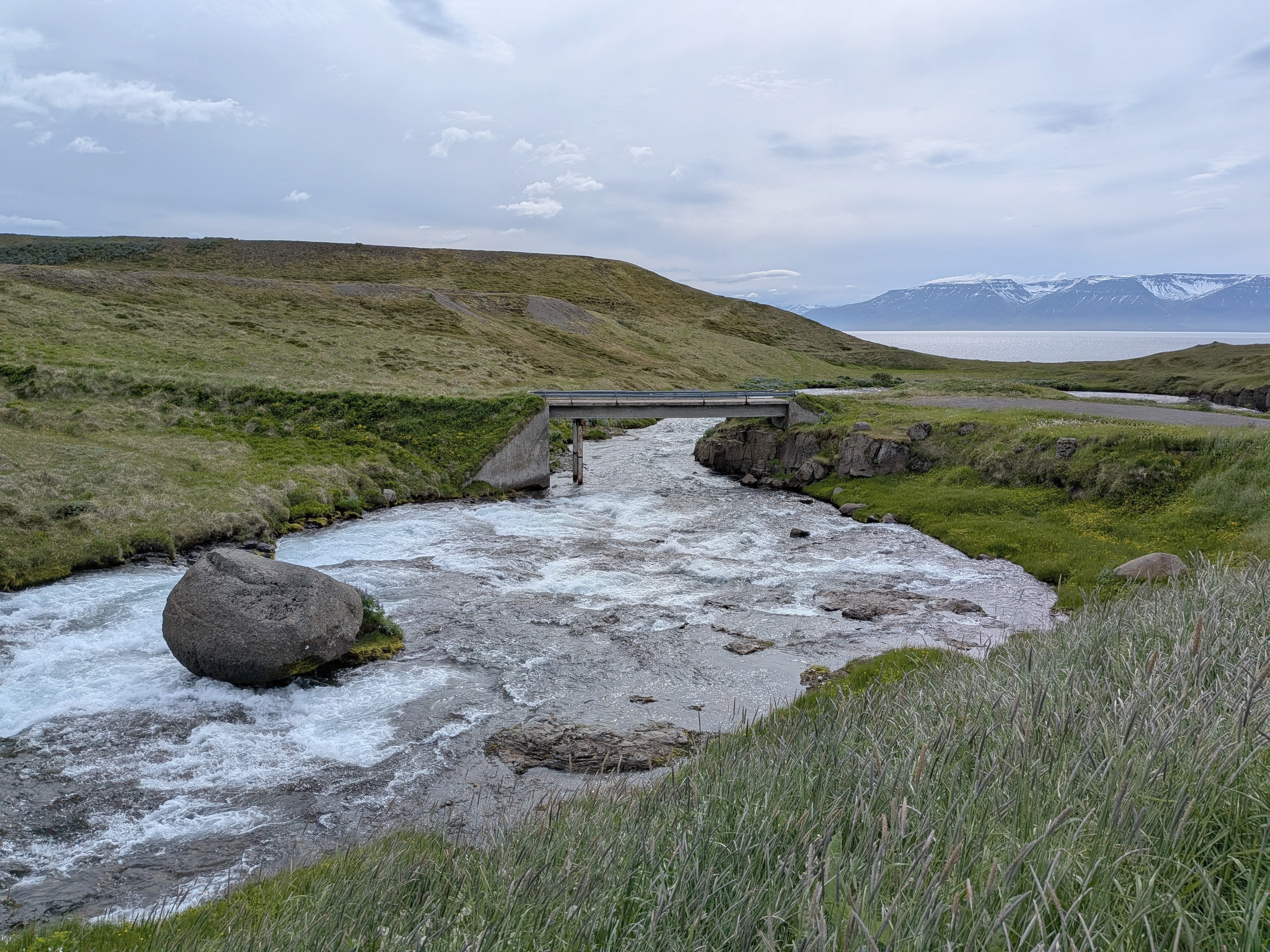

Location
- Country: Iceland
- State: Skagafjörður
- Region: Höfðaströnd

Physical characteristics
- Mouth
  - coordinates: 65°53′13.77″N 19°22′56.47″W
- Length: 11 km (6.8 mi)

Grafará river is a spring creek in Höfðaströnd named after the farm Gröf in Skagafjörður, Iceland.

The river runs along the bottom of Deildardalur valley, where it is called Deildará (Deild river), then continues between Óslandshlíð and Höfðaströnd near Gröf and to the sea in Grafarós, directly south of Hofsós. There is some fishing in the river, especially for arctic char, but both brown trout and salmon have been found there.
