= Flókadalur =

Flókadalur can refer to two places in Iceland:

- Flókadal in Borgarfjarðarsýsla
- Flókadal in Skagafjarðarsýsla
