= Unadalur =

Valley in eastern Skagafjörður, Iceland

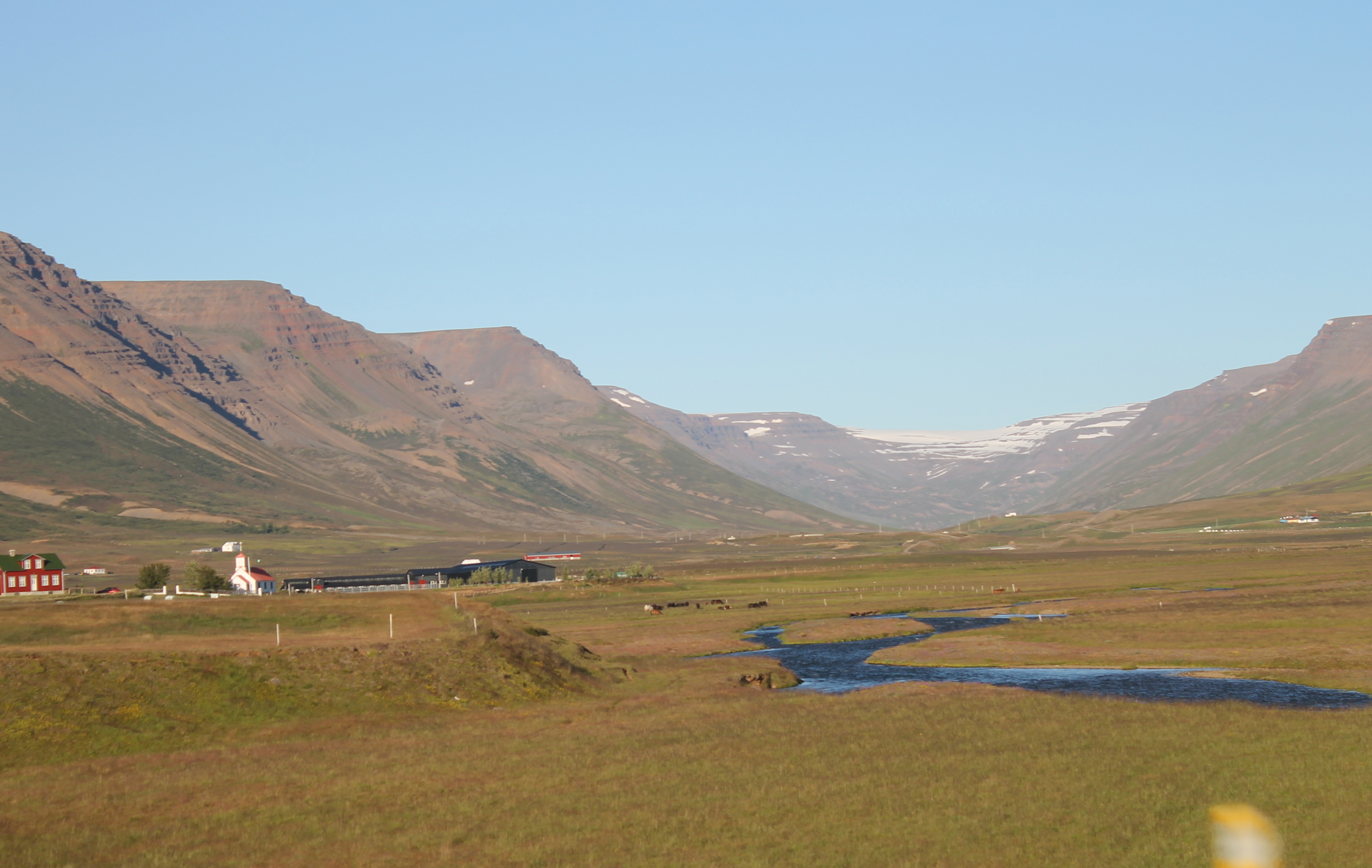
- Unadalur near Hof
- Floor elevation: 150 m (490 ft)

Geography
- Country: Iceland
- State/Province: Skagafjörður
- Population centers: Hofsós, Hof
- Coordinates: 65°52′53.000″N 19°6′13.766″W
- River: Unadalsá, also called Hofsá
- Interactive map of Unadalur

Unadalur ("Uni's Valley" in English) is a valley on the east side of Skagafjörður, Iceland, a short distance up from Hofsós, north of Deildardalur. It is rather wide and there is considerable lowland and several farms. The river that runs through it is called Unadalsá near the top of the valley and Hofsá at the bottom. The valley is often a very snowy area in winter. At the bottom of Unadalur is Unadalsjökull, one of the numerous valley glaciers in Tröllaskagi. There is an old mountain road that runs through Unadalur to Svarfaðardalur.

The Landnámabók does not mention who settled the northern part of Deildadalur or the southern part of Unadalur. However, Uni is mentioned in reference to Unadalur and it may be that he was a settler there, but the authors of the Landnámabók neglected to include his account.
