= Röki =

2020 adventure video game

- Developer: Polygon Treehouse
- Publisher: United Label Games
- Designers: Alex Kanaris-Sotiriou, Tom Jones
- Composer: Aether
- Engine: Unity
- Platforms: Windows; macOS; Nintendo Switch; PlayStation 4; PlayStation 5; Xbox Series X/S
- Release: Windows, macOS; July 23, 2020; Nintendo Switch; October 15, 2020; PS4, PS5, Xbox Series X/S; October 28, 2021
- Genre: Adventure game
- Mode: Single-player

Röki is an adventure video game developed by British studio Polygon Treehouse and published by United Label Games. It follows Tove, a young girl, traveling into the ancient wilderness to rescue her younger brother Lars from Röki, a pitch-black monster from the pages of a fairy tale.

== Gameplay ==
In Röki, the player takes the role of Tove, a young girl journeying into the wilderness to find her brother Lars. Designed to be "a game of brains not brawn", it follows the course of her adventure as she encounters folklore creatures and solves puzzles to unlock paths deeper into the forest.

The gameplay is a modern take on the point and click genre, with players collecting items in a backpack to then be used in the game world to solve puzzles. Players can also collect items in a sort of catalogue, which are scattered about the game's setting and can be viewed in Tove's Journal. The Journal also includes a map of each visit-able location and information about it and the characters found within, based on Tove's perspective. The game features accessible controls, like a toggle that highlights all interactive items and characters in one area. There are also mechanics introduced near the end of the game, including switching between an invisibility mask and a revealing mask to free the Stag, and the ability to switch between Tove and her father, Henrik, to solve the last of the game's puzzles. For the latter mechanic, any item collected by either character can then be used by the other as well as the character who collected it.

== Plot ==
Deep in the mountains, a young girl named Tove lives with her father, Henrik, and her younger brother Lars. When Lars was just a baby, his and Tove's mother, Eva, died, leaving Henrik grief-stricken and spending most of his days asleep in front of the fire. Thus it is left up to Tove to care for her father and her more imaginative younger brother Lars, who loves fairy tales and often acts like he can see the creatures from those folk tales. One night, as Tove is putting Lars to bed, she decides to read Lars their mother's favorite fairy tale, about the Jötnar and the Baby, which Eva had always told Tove was real. The fairy tale goes that there existed four giant guardians of an enchanted forest, Jötunbjörn the Bear of Autumn, Jötunhjort the Stag of Summer, Jötunúlfur the Wolf of Spring, and Jötunravn the Raven of Winter. Soon humans came to the forest, and a humble woodcutter caught the Raven's eye, falling in love with him. The Raven took human form and assumed the name Rörka, marrying the man and becoming pregnant. However, because the child was only half-human, he was wild and dangerous. Horrified, the other three guardians imprisoned Rörka and her son in the prison realm of Utangard.

That very same night, the children's home is attacked by a pitch-black creature. The children managed to escape down the mountain, but Henrik is left trapped beneath debris and surrounded by fire, and he forces Tove and Lars to leave him behind. The two children escape into the forest at the base of the mountain, intending to reach the nearby town for help, but Lars, momentarily forgetting the danger and distracted by his imagination, is separated from his sister and captured by the monster. Tove manages to pursue the two to a portal at the edge of a lake, and sees Lars just as the monster's claw grabs him and drags Lars through the portal. Tove is unable to reach the portal in time as it closes. Lars is taken to Utangard, where the monster is revealed to be Röki the son of Rörka, who intends to use Lars, because he is forest-born and thus touched by magic, as a sacrifice in a ritual of dark magic to transform Röki into a human, intending to give her son the life she believes he deserves as humans cannot accept monsters. The ritual had previously been attempted before, but has failed each time, with the previous children dying before Röki could be transformed. During the ritual, Lars and Röki begin to grow close, and develop a friendly bond, which Rörka writes off and tries to prevent her son from making it more painful than it has to be.

Meanwhile, dawn breaks in the forest, and Tove decides to set off and reopen the portal to rescue Lars, finding she can see the many magical creatures of the forest after nearly getting through the portal, and learns that she needs a Jötunn to fully open the way. Thus, Tove sets off to find the three guardians. During this time she meets and helps various folkloric creatures inhabiting the forest. Tove's adventures in the forest include; meeting the Tree of Many and the Waytrees, which became disconnected from their Great Mother Tree thanks to Rörka's ravens, becoming friends with two trollsisters, the last of the trollfolk that once lived in the forest, reuniting a family of Krokelings with their mother, giving an offering to the Fossegrim, who teaches Tove how to control water, helping the Yule Cat whose black fur has grayed, freeing a Nokken, the spirit of a drowned girl, rescuing a trapped Älva, and defeating the giant spider Widow Drau and freeing her prey, the cave Tomte. During this adventure, Tove also finds mysterious illness spreading throughout the forest, a fungus blight, and meets with a mysterious voice who gives her two recipes to help Tove in her quest, one for a mask of invisibility and another for a mask to reveal hidden beings. After collecting all the ingredients and freeing two of the Guardians, the Wolf and the Bear, from the source of forest's illness, the Nattamare Parasites, the voice reveals itself to be a Shroomi, a living mushroom. With the masks made by the Shroomi, as well as a cure for the blight, Tove is able to free the Stag, the final guardian, and end the forest's illness. While freeing the guardians from the Nattamare Parasites inflicted upon them by Rörka as they slept, Tove undergoes visions that reveal forgotten memories involving her mother, including an old song her mother taught her, that it was Tove and not Henrik who dropped her mother's belongings down a well after Tove's mom passed, and fixing corrupted memories of the events prior to Eva's death.

After awakening all the guardians and getting each to agree to help Tove, as well as the Bear and the Stag revealing regret for banishing Rörka and that she had run after Röki's birth out of fear of her husband's reaction before being imprisoned by her brothers and sister, the guardians open the portal for Tove to Utangard. Henrik is revealed to be alive, and recalling the nights events, rushes down the mountain on foot to find his children, retracing their steps through the forest, and arriving just after Tove passes through the portal as it closes. Seeing that Utangard (the giant castle) is across the lake, Henrik takes a nearby boat and rows towards it. Henrik arrives at the castle, but because he did not pass through the portal, it is simply a normal castle, leaving him and Tove separated on two different planes. Despite only feeling a ghostly presence of one another, which Henrik originally misinterprets to be Eva, the two work on their different sides to get through the castle. While exploring, Henrik finds leftover equipment and notes of a prior expedition to the castle, led by a man looking for his missing son, Elias, though like Henrik, he had not passed through the guardian's portal and was thus unable to enter the true Utangard, meaning he was unable to rescue his son. Unable to go any further, Henrik uses a cage to allow Tove to reach the top of the tower where Röki, Rörka, and Lars are.

At the top of the tower, Tove finds the ritual almost complete, Lars near-death, as is Rörka, the ritual having taken a stronger toll on her than she thought. Despite a plea from Tove to use her instead of Lars, and Lars stating that Rörka is turning her son into something he doesn't want to be, Rörka continues with the ritual. Upset over being called a monster, Rörka sends Tove into her repressed memory of Eva's death; The family's car crashed in the forest as they were on their to the hospital for Eva to give birth. Henrik asked Tove to find a nearby payphone, but Eva stopped her from running off and give birth to Lars in the cold of the winter forest, dying shortly afterward from exposure. Rörka tries to make Tove think she is the true monster for letting her family down and leading to Eva's death, but Tove is able to ward off Rörka's manipulations and convince Röki to stop the transformation and save Lars, his friend. Though the ritual has been stopped and Lars saved, Rörka, still greatly weakened and near death, is greatly angered. However, her brothers and sister, the other guardians, arrive and apologize for what they did to her and to Röki. They explain how Tove helped them, and see that the forest can only be restored with all of them leaving for 'the next realm.' The other three want Rörka to come with them, and convince her that Röki should be allowed to make his own path, free of his mother. The guardians depart, wishing Tove well and Rörka apologizing for all the pain she caused while hoping that her son finds the life he deserves.

Some time later, Tove calls for Lars, alerting to him that its time for dinner, made by Henrik for a change, who has also completed rebuilding the house. As Tove and Henrik run off-screen, Lars hears the footsteps and roar of Röki behind him, and tells him that their 'adventuring' is finished for the day, and time for the two of them to return home. It is left ambiguous whether or not only Lars can see Röki, or if Tove and Henrik can see him too as they did at the start of the game.

== Development ==
Polygon Treehouse pitched and secured funding for Röki as part of the fourth year round of funding from the UK Games Fund. The soundtrack was composed by Scottish composer Aether.

== Reception ==
Reception

Aggregate scores
Aggregator	Score
Metacritic	(PC) 76/100 (NS) 79/100 (PS5) 82/100
OpenCritic	78% recommend

Review scores
Publication	Score
Adventure Gamers	4.5/5
Eurogamer	Recommended
Nintendo World Report	7.5/10
Push Square	8/10
The Guardian	3/5

=== Critical reception ===
Röki received "generally favorable" reviews, according to review aggregator Metacritic. Fellow review aggregator OpenCritic assessed that the game received strong approval, being recommended by 78% of critics.

Tola Onanuga of The Guardian calls the game an "impressively rich point-and-click adventure game". She finds some of the puzzles challenging, but when she took time to survey her surroundings - generally fairly easy. She also likes the game's "striking cel-shaded design". However, she scores the game 3 out of 5 stars.

Pascal Tekaia of Adventure Gamers writes that the cast of characters is impressive. He praises the dialog and voice acting, even though each line of subtitled dialog is accompanied by only one spoken word, or an effect like a sigh or a giggle. The reviewer also praises music (even though it is "a bit lacking in strong themes, particularly during the narrative’s high points") and sound effects. He likes backgrounds that "look like something out of a storybook" and often are animated, however he finds some of the locations too cluttered. As far as the difficulty curve of the puzzles is concerned, the reviewer finds it "pretty gentle". In the end he gives the game 4 and a half of 5 stars.

Eurogamer's reviewer praises scenery, writing: "Caves and temples and forests are hardly new to video games, but they seem freshly wrought here (...)". He appreciates the way the game mixes fairy-tales with reality: "Röki's about woodland ponds, but it's also about pond scum. (...) And it's about magic, but what it's really about is the stuff that magic can't undo." Ultimately he summarises the game: "It's earthy magic. It's fantastic."

PushSquare reviewer writes that mechanically it is another point-and-click game, but "it never strays into the territory of solutions so obtuse no sane person could possibly figure it out like point-and-clicks of yore". The reviewer praises environment design, writing that "This game is beautiful" and presents "a lovingly crafted world", even though "Tove's character and her brother leave a bit to be desired".

Jamie Latour from The Gamer admires the game's user-friendliness, writing: "Roki, in my mind, does adventure game mechanics extremely well." She notes features like the ability to highlight all interactive items nearby "to prevent hours of lost wandering", and access to the journal, containing a map and collectible item lists, stating "it felt like a quality-of-life adjustment that this genre should always have from now on."

=== Accolades ===
The game was nominated for "Best Debut Game" at The Game Awards 2020, nominated in categories "Debut Game" and "British Game" from the BAFTA Game Awards, and won "Best Indie Game" at the DevGamm awards in 2020. It won "Best Traditional Adventure", "Readers' Choice" for "Best Adventure", and nominee for "Best Adventure" at the 2020 Adventure Gamers Aggie Awards. Most recently, Röki was a nominee for "Best Writing in a Video Game" by the Writers' Guild of Great Britain in 2021.
