= Guðmundur Erlendsson =

Icelandic poet and clergyman

Guðmundur Erlendsson (c. 1595–1670) was an Icelandic poet and clergyman. He was born on the church farm of Fell in Sléttuhlíð, where he later served as parson.

His best-known work is Einvaldsóður, a translation of David Lyndsay's poem Ane Dialog betwixt Experience and ane Courteor (or the Monarchie). In 2017, Icelandic composer Guðmundur Steinn Gunnarsson used the full text of the poem for the chamber opera Einvaldsóður, which premiered at the 2017 Sláturtíð festival.

Guðmundur Erlendsson was a versatile and prolific poet who achieved considerable popularity in his day. Although primarily known as a religious poet, he also composed rímur and other poems on subjects as diverse as the life of Aesop, Grýla and the events of the so-called Tyrkjarán in 1627.
