= Höfði á Höfðaströnd =

Farm in Skagafjörður, Iceland

Höfði in Höfðaströnd Höfði á Höfðaströnd
- Farm
- Interactive map of Höfði in Höfðaströnd
- Country: Iceland
- County: Skagafjörður (municipality)
- District: Höfðaströnd
- Named for: Höfða-Þórður Bjarnarson

Höfði á Höfðaströnd (Höfði in Höfðaströnd) is a farm on the eastern side of Skagafjörður, Iceland. It was the homestead of Höfða-Þórður Bjarnarson and a former church site. Höfði is north of Höfðavatn lake, in a dell southwest of Höfðahólar, which was formed from the remains of a landslide from the mountain above it.

== History ==
Höfði was the most remote farm in the former municipality Höfðahreppur, outside of where Fellshreppur used to begin. Half of Þórðarhöfði belongs to Höfði and half to the farm. Höfði also owns Höfðamöl between Höfðavatn and the sea and a share of Höfðavatn, in which they have partial fishing rights.

A church that had been in Höfði since early in Iceland's history was closed down in 1891.

Höfði is featured in the movie Movie Days directed by Friðrik Þór Friðriksson. Friðrik has roots in Höfði and the opening scene in his movie Children of Nature was recorded there.
