= Grafarós =

Estuary in Skagafjörður, Iceland

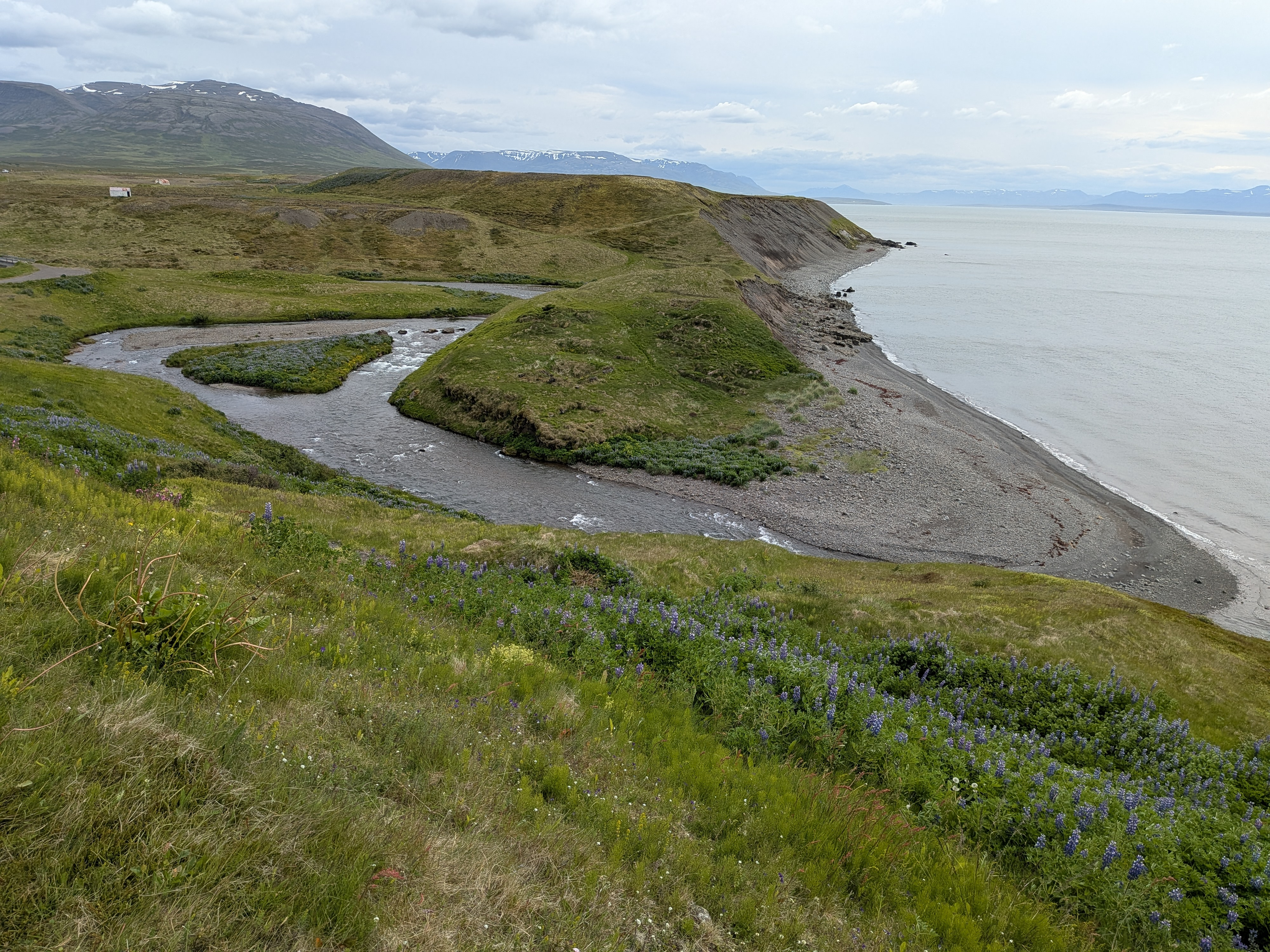
- Location: Höfðaströnd, Skagafjörður, Iceland
- Coordinates: 65°53′21.149″N 19°23′56.386″W
- Type: Estuary
- Etymology: Named for the Grafará river. "Ós" is the Icelandic word for "estuary."
- Primary inflows: Grafará

Location
- Interactive map of Grafarós

Grafarós in Höfðaströnd, just south of Hofsós, is the estuary of the Grafará river in Skagafjörður, Iceland. Ships would sometimes dock there and a market was established there in 1835, but it fell into disuse in 1915. It is possible to see the remains of the market and residences there, which are protected sites.
