= Fellshreppur (Skagafjörður) =

Former municipality in Skagafjörður, Iceland

Fellshreppur Sléttuhlíðarhreppur
- Hreppur
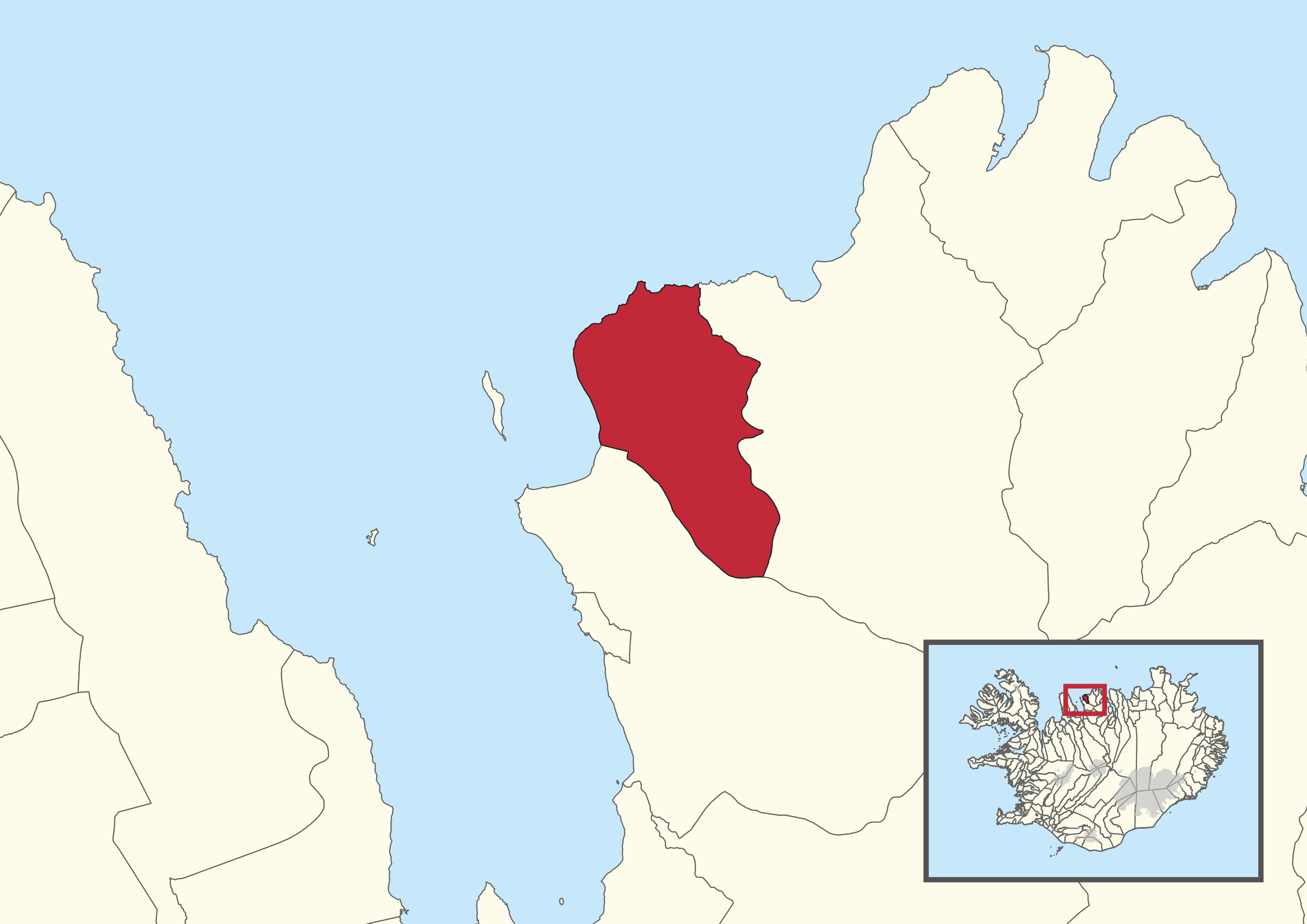
- Fellshreppur
- Country: Iceland
- Country: Skagafjörður
- Merger with Hofshreppur: June 10, 1999
- Named for: Fell í Sléttuhlíð
- Districts: List: Sléttuhlíð, Hrolleifsdalur
- Time zone: UTC+0
- Now a part of Skagafjörður (municipality)

Fellshreppur, previously Sléttuhlíðarhreppur, was a hreppur, an old Icelandic municipality, in Skagafjörður County, Iceland, located on the east side of the fjord. It was named after the church site Fell in Sléttuhlíð. There were two districts in the hreppur: Sléttuhlíð and Hrolleifsdalur, the latter of which has long since been abandoned and become pasture land.

Fellshreppur joined Hofshreppur on June 10, 1990.

== Hreppur Council ==
The last Fellshreppur council was elected in the hreppur committee election on June 14, 1986, in which Eggert Jóhannsson, Jón Björn Sigurðsson, Kristján Árnason, Magnús Pétursson, and Stefán Gestsson were voted into office.
