= Ólafur Davíðsson =

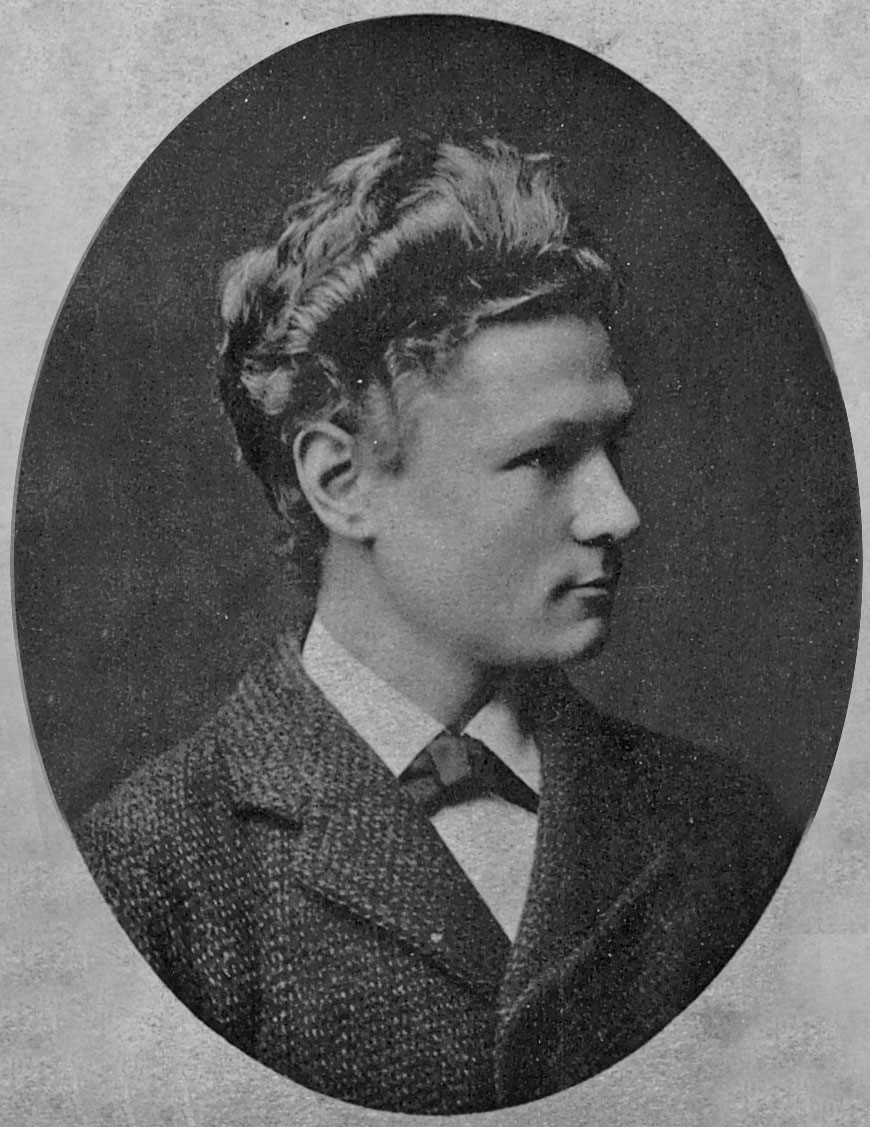
Ólafur Davíðsson

Ólafur Davíðsson (26 January 1862 – 6 September 1903), was an Icelandic natural scientist, ethnographer and folklore collector.

== Biography ==
Ólafur Davíðsson was born on 26 January 1862 at Fell in Sléttuhlíð. He was a student at The Learned School in Reykjavík from 1874 to 1882 and kept a diary of his last year of study there.

Ólafur studied natural sciences at the University of Copenhagen but then immediately turned to ethnology, working at the Arnamagnæan Institute.

In 1897, Ólafur returned to Iceland and was a part-time teacher at Möðruvellir in Hörgárdal, where he also engaged in folklore collecting and other scholarly work. Ólafur drowned in Hörgá, single and childless, on 6 September 1903.

== Works ==
- Íslenskar gátur, skemtanir, vikivakar og þulur: safnað hafa J. Árnason og Ó. Davíðsson ("Icelandic Riddles, Entertainment, Weekends and Rhymes: collected by J Arnason and O. Davidsson"), 1–4, Kaupmannahöfn, Bókmenntafélagið, 1887-1903
- Galdur og galdramál á Íslandi ("Magic and Sorcery in Iceland"), 1–3, Reykjavík, Sögufélag, 1941-1943
- Ég læt allt fjúka: sendibréf og dagbókarbrot frá skólaárunum ("I let Everything Blow: Letters and Diary Extracts from the School Years"), Reykjavík, Ísafoldarprentsmiðja, 1955
- Íslenskar þjóðsögur, 1–4, Reykjavík, Þjóðsaga, 1978-1980
- Hundakæti: Dagbækur Ólafs Davíðssonar 1881-1884. ("Hundakaeti: the Diaries of Olaf Davidsson, 1881-1884"). Reykjavík, Mál & menning, 2018
