= Grýla =

Fictional character in Icelandic folklore

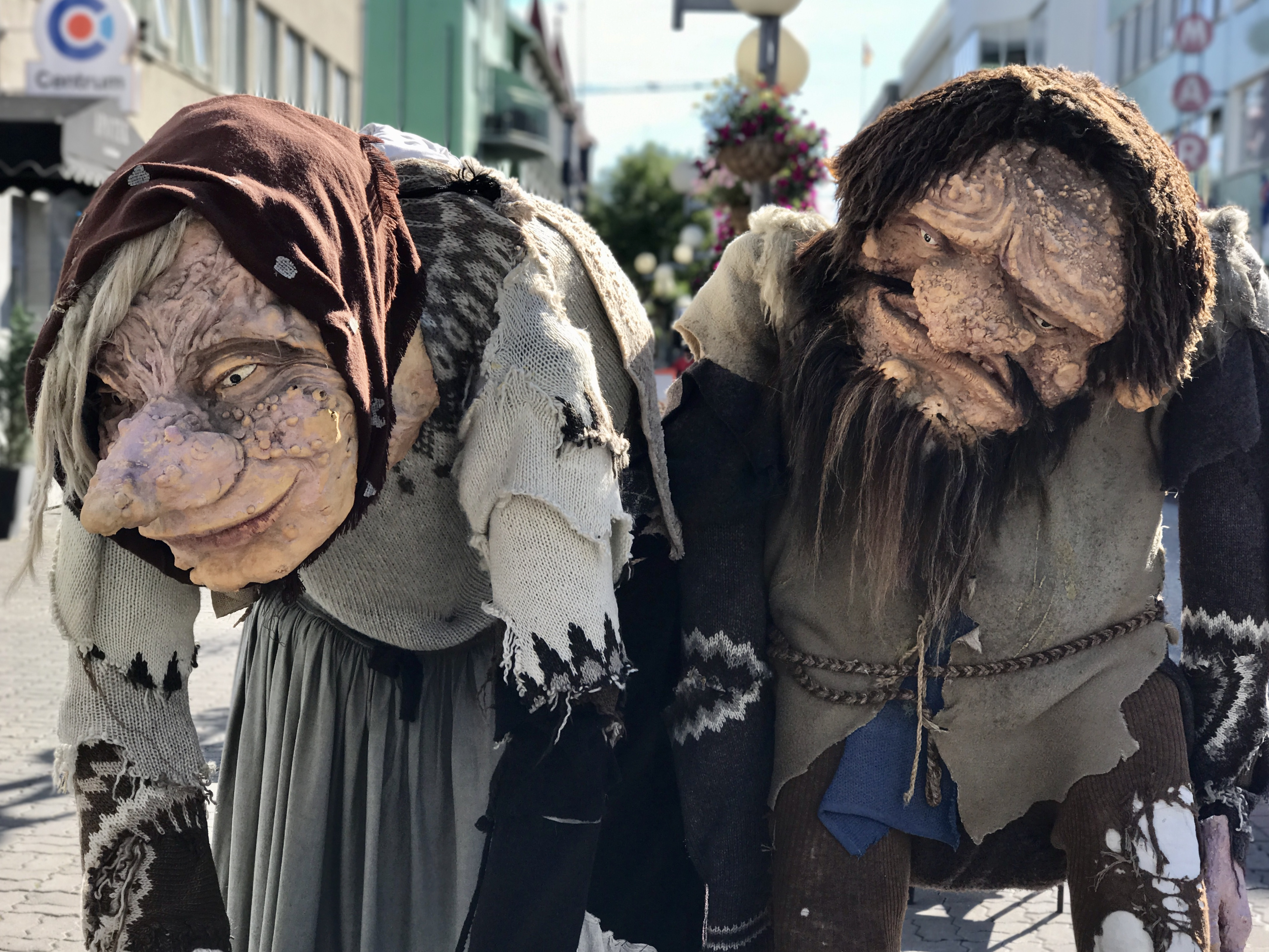
Mascot costumes of Grýla (left) and Leppaluði (right)

In Icelandic folklore, Grýla is a monstrous entity who lives in the wilderness of Iceland. The name Grýla is first attested in medieval sources. The earliest unambiguous references to Grýla's gender and her association with Christmas, though, date only from the 17th century. In 17th-century poems about Grýla, she is generally represented as a hideous and greedy troll-like crone, who wanders between human settlements and demands charity from those she encounters, often asking for naughty children. Modern depictions of Grýla tend to focus more strongly on her role as the mother of the Yule Lads (Icelandic: jólasveinar). Today, the most monstrous aspects of her character and appearance (such as her appetite for children) are generally toned down for younger audiences.

== In premodern sources ==
The name Grýla appears in a list of heiti for troll-women in the Prose Edda, composed in the 13th century by Icelandic skald Snorri Sturluson. However, a list of Grýlu heiti (heiti for Grýla) in one manuscript of the Prose Edda from the early 14th century, gives various terms for foxes, which suggests an association with the Arctic fox.

Poems naming Grýla are known from the Faroe Islands as well as Iceland. The oldest poems belong to the oral tradition. Several parallels to Grýla exist in the North Atlantic region, and these are generally associated with mumming and disguise traditions (see mummer's play). Terry Gunnell hypothesizes that Grýla may once have been associated with similar disguise traditions in Iceland, although such practices have not survived to the present. In contrast to later depictions of Grýla, no explicit mention is made of Grýla's gender. Not all counterparts to Grýla identified by Gunnell are female figures, and Grýla possibly was originally conceived of as a male monster rather than an ogress. In one 17th-century poem about Grýla, which depicts her as wandering between farms in summer rather than at Christmas, she is described as a hermaphrodite.

== In Christmas folklore and popular culture ==
Grýla is closely associated with Christmas folklore in younger traditions. The oldest extant source connecting Grýla with Christmas is a poem that was likely co-composed by the Rev. Guðmundur Erlendsson of Fell in Sléttuhlíð and his brother-in-law Ásgrímur Magnússon, who was a farmer and rímur-poet. This poem, Grýlukvæði, can be dated to around 1638–1644. Several years after this, circa 1648–1649, the Rev. Hallgrímur Pétursson composed a poem, Leppalúðakvæði, in which Grýla's lazy and unpleasant husband, Leppalúði, makes his appearance and claims that Grýla was left bedridden after her journey to Sléttuhlíð. Yet another Grýlukvæði was composed by Stefán Ólafsson of Vallanes (c. 1618–1688).

Since the 20th century, the Yule cat appears as Grýla's pet.

In the Netflix show Chilling Adventures of Sabrina, Grýla (portrayed by Heather Doerksen in part 1 and part 3, Samantha Coughlan in part 4) is a recurring character, appearing at first to collect her children who are invisible, but causing havoc. She subsequently joins the main characters' coven of outcast witches.

Grýla appears as the main villain in the 2024 Christmas action comedy film Red One, portrayed by Kiernan Shipka, who had previously portrayed the titular Sabrina in the aforementioned TV series. In this film, the character referred to as the Christmas witch, who has magical powers, including the ability to shapeshift in to her mythological ogre form, which is voiced by Morla Gorrondona.

Grýla also appears in her eponymous episode of Hilda, in which the Yule Lads ultimately feed her vegetable soup instead of humans.

Grýla also makes an appearance in the 2022 video game God of War: Ragnarök, in which she is the grandmother of Angrboða.
