= Sölvi Helgason =

Icelandic artist, philosopher and drifter (1820–1895)

- Born: August 16, 1820; Sléttuhliíð, Skagafjörður, Iceland
- Died: November 27, 1895 (aged 75); Sléttuhliíð
- Other names: Helgason, Sölvi Guðmundssen; Islandus, Sólon; Hann Vitri, Sjúlvi
- Occupations: Folk artist and drifter

Sölvi Helgason (August 16, 1820 – November 27, 1895) was an artist, philosopher and drifter in Iceland. If he had not been arrested, no more than folk tales about Sölvi's life would have been known. He never went to school, but was known to always be painting and writing. It is posited from his writings that he was mentally ill and suffered from paranoia; he was known to accuse people of stealing his work. He often referred to himself by made-up names as well as names of playwrights, artists, musicians and philosophers: Sókrates, Plato, Sólon, Melanchthon, Sölvi Spekingur, Sjúlvi, Húsfriður, Sjúlvi Hinn Vitri, Húmboldt, Spinoza, Göte, Hegel, Schiller, Schott, Newton, Caesar, Leonardo da Vinci, Vasco da Gama, Kant, Lamertine, Skagfjörð Norðlandíus, Beethoven and Shakespeare. Sölvi was convicted several times for vagrancy, falsifying his traveling papers or passport and for petty theft. He was often flogged and spent three years in prison in Denmark. Today approximately 100 of Sölvi's artworks and manuscripts are in the collection of the National and University Library of Iceland and the National Museum of Iceland.

== Art ==
There are no known artworks dated prior to 1854, when Sölvi first went to prison. Although it is believed that he was drawing from a young age, Sölvi claimed in legal documents that his early artwork was destroyed.

Sölvi's artwork falls into two visual themes: 1) floral patterns with decorative capital letters and 2) figurative drawings.

His floral patterns don't change at all in the documented 30 years. These pieces were typically gifts to the people he was staying with.

The figurative drawings are mainly of people that Sölvi had conflict with. He would add horns and extra eyes in an attempt to portray these people as demonic. These artworks show a more creative and emotional side to Sölvi's artwork.

== Life ==
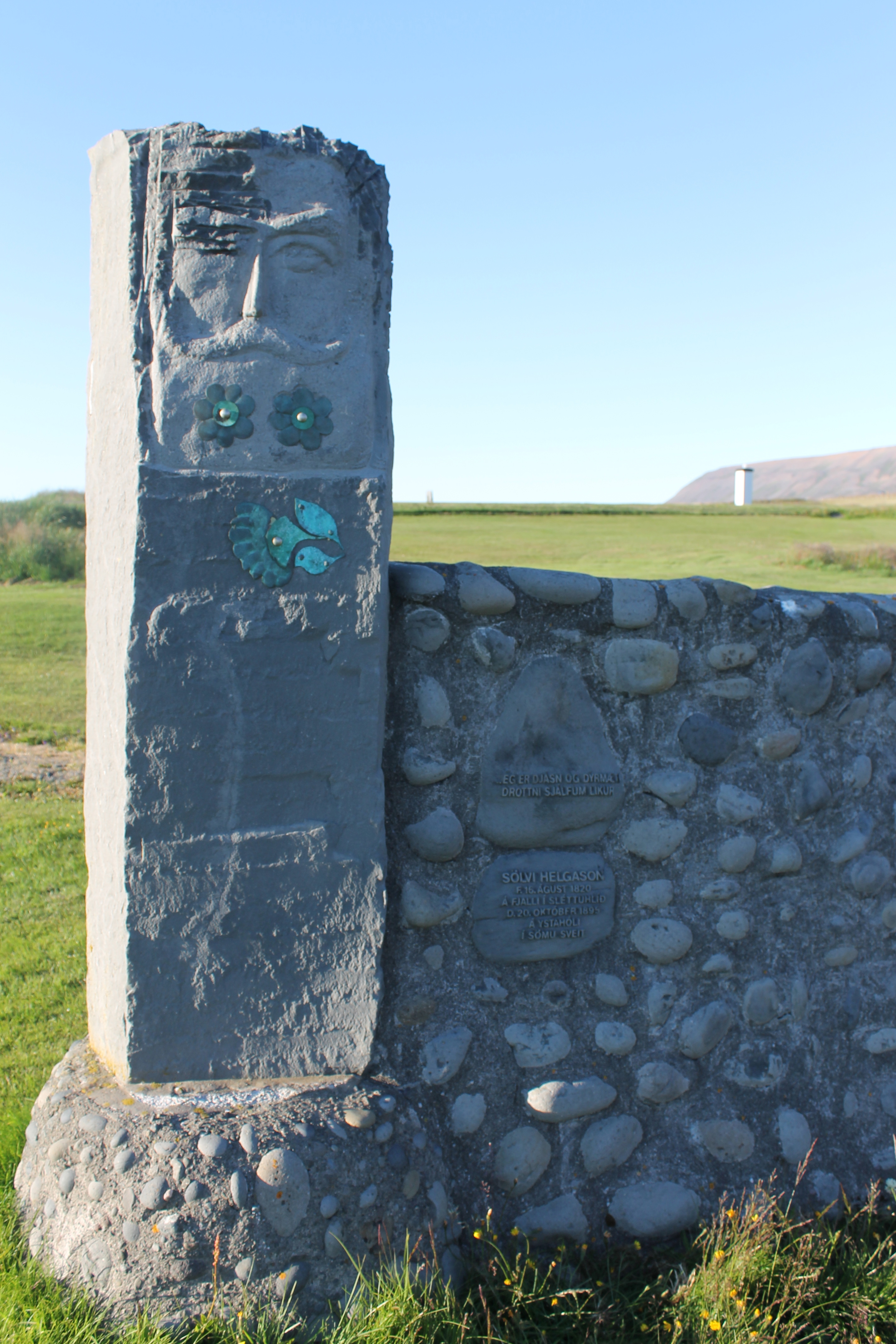
Memorial to Sölvi Helgason at Lónkot in Skagafjörður, Iceland.

=== Early life ===
Sölvi Helgason was born on a farm called Fjall in Sléttuhliíð in the eastern part of Skagafjörður on August 16, 1820. The day after he was born, he was baptized at the nearest church. Sölvi's father was called Helgi Guðmundsson and his mother was called Ingiríður Gísladóttir, they were young, poor farmers who moved often between farms. When Sölvi was three, his father died. He didn't live with his mother from the age of six, he was fostered at various farms in the area around his home. His mother died when he was 14 years old.

Oral history describes Sölvi as reckless and unruly but that he showed signs of intelligence. There are also stories of a harsh upbringing. When Sölvi was 11, he was fostered for two years by a reverend called Ólafur Hjaltason Thorberg in Hvanneyri in Siglufjörður. The reverend he lived with had a library and it is thought that Sölvi's inspiration for his artwork came from viewing illustrated books; he also stated in legal documents that he learned to read both in Icelandic and Danish at this farm.

At the age of 15, Sölvi was fostered at a farm called Undhóll in Óslandshlíð, which wasn't far from a regional trading center in Kolkuós, where Sölvi may have purchased watercolor materials.

Björn Þórðarson, District Administrative Officer at Ystahóll helped Sölvi get confirmed at a local church when he was 16 years old. When he was 18 years old, he was sent to Möðruvellir in Hörgádalur to stay with Bjarni Thorarensen who was a prefect and poet. He stayed there for at least one year before he went east to Þingeyjar and Múlasýslu. From there he started drifting around the country.

=== The drifter ===
Sölvi traveled around Iceland trading drawings of people and decorative letter forms for food and a place to sleep. In October 1843, Sölvi was arrested in Staðarsveit in Snæfellsnes. At that time, it was mandatory to have written permission from the sheriff in order to travel around Iceland; traveling papers or passport. Sölvi's traveling papers weren't acceptable because they contained strange praising writings about him and had an obviously forged signature of the local sheriff. He later admitted that he had falsified this passport. On March 8, 1845, Sölvi was sentenced for carrying a fake passport and for being a drifter. His punishment was 40 lashes and one year of supervision by the authorities. The punishment was reduced by the supreme court to 27 lashes and 8 months of supervision.

In March 1850, Sölvi was arrested again after being accused of stealing books and clothing. The authorities couldn't prove he had done so, however because of his history of petty theft and his continual illegal drifting around Iceland, he was sentenced in 1854 to spend three years in a prison in Copenhagen. In 1858 he came back to Iceland and was sent back to his home region. When he discussed his stay in Denmark, he pretended that he had been a free man and claimed to undergo a period of study in art and philosophy at the University of Copenhagen.

=== Family ===
After his imprisonment in Denmark, sometime after 1860, Sölvi stayed at a farm in Húnavatnssýsla. There he met the Júlíana Sveinbjörnsdóttir, who is described as being both physically and mentally disabled, and who became his lover and traveling partner. Sölvi would carry Júlíana in a sack on his back while they traveled around Iceland; people would laugh and make fun of the pair, but Sölvi and Júlíana ignored the mockery, because there was no better way to travel. Together Sölvi and Júlíana had one daughter, Stefanía Kristín Sölvadóttir, in 1867. Because of his constant drifting, Sölvi didn't raise his daughter; she was considered to look very much like him, but they probably didn't know each other well. Stefanía had two children in Iceland, then just before 1900, she moved to America and had more children.
