= Yule cat =

Huge cat in Icelandic folklore

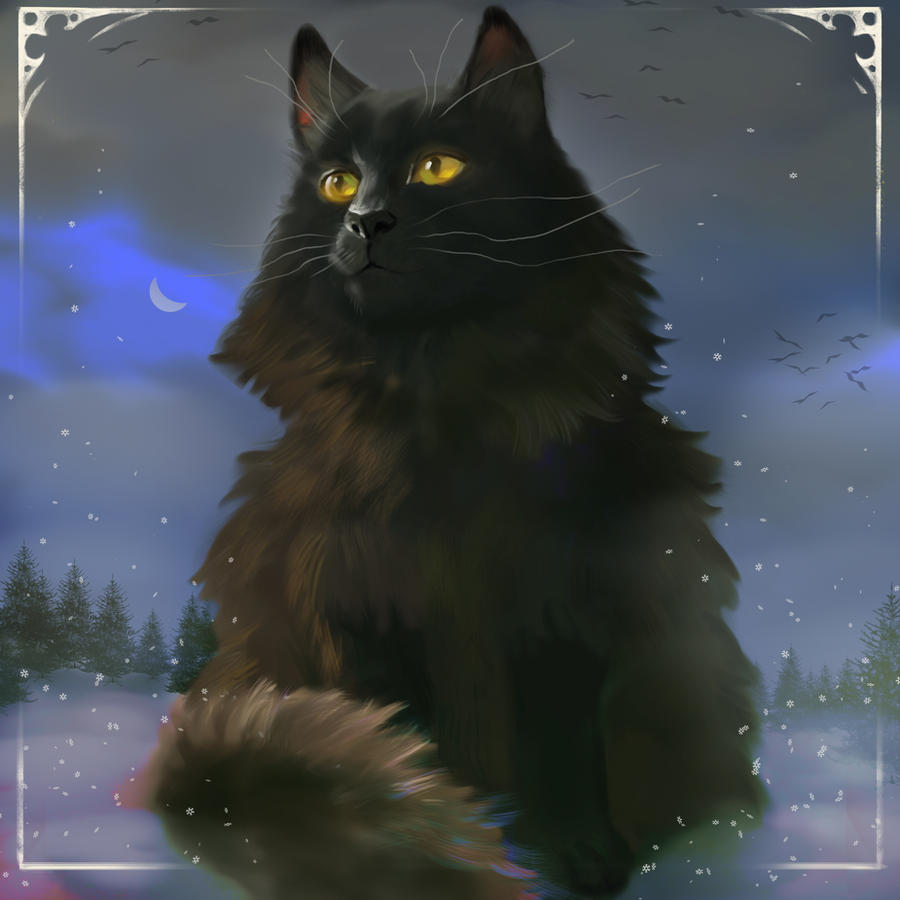
- Artwork depicting the Yule cat

Creature information
- Other names: Jólakötturinn; Jólaköttur; Christmas cat
- Grouping: Monster
- Sub grouping: Icelandic Christmas folklore

Origin
- First attested: Íslenzkar þjóðsögur og æfintýri in 1862
- Country: Iceland

The Yule cat (Icelandic: Jólakötturinn, IPA: [ˈjouːlaˌkʰœhtʏrɪn], also called Jólaköttur and the Christmas cat) is a mythical cat in Icelandic Christmas folklore. It is said to be huge, vicious, to lurk in the snowy countryside during the Christmas season, and to eat people who do not receive new clothing before Christmas Eve. In other versions of the story, the cat only eats the food of the people who had not received new clothing. Jólakötturinn is closely associated with other figures from Icelandic folklore, considered the pet of the ogress Grýla and her sons, the Yule Lads.

== History ==
=== Origins ===
The first definitive mention of the Yule cat is from an 1862 collection of folklore by Jón Árnason, Íslenzkar þjóðsögur og æfintýri. It was described as an evil beast that would either eat those who did not get new clothes for Christmas, or eat their "Christmas bit" (an extra portion of food given to residents of a farm). Jón gave no source for either story.

Two theories have since been proposed for the origin of the story. In one theory, folklorist Árni Björnsson points to a footnote by Jón which uses the figure of speech "to dress the cat". From this footnote and the lack of any written sources about the Yule cat prior to Jón's writings, Árni concluded that the phrase was the source from which Jón created the monster. In another theory, archaeologist Guðmundur Ólafsson connects the Yule cat to various entities that, in other European traditions, accompanied Saint Nicholas. Guðmundur noted that sources for any kind of folklore in history were typically scarce, so the lack of written sources on the Yule cat did not carry much significance.

The Yule cat was traditionally used as a threat and incentive for farm workers to finish processing the wool collected in the autumn before Christmas. Those who took part in the work were rewarded with new clothes, but those who did not would get nothing and thus would be prey for the Yule cat.

=== Christmas is Coming ===
The establishment of the Yule cat as part of classic Icelandic Christmas folklore came in 1932, when Jóhannes úr Kötlum published his poetry collection Jólin koma (lit. 'Christmas is Coming'). One of the poems, Jólakötturinn, centered on the eponymous man-eating monster which subsequently became a common part of Christmas festivities and decorations in Iceland.

While the poem did not associate Jólakötturinn with Grýla, Leppalúði, or the Yule Lads, the characters were also featured in the collection. This commonality led to connections in later stories. By the middle of the 20th century, Jólakötturinn was considered the pet of Grýla and her sons. In some later stories, Jólakötturinn is so disobedient that only Stúfur, the smallest Yule Lad, is able to direct it, and he rides the cat across the countryside.

Ingibjörg Þorbergs composed several songs based on Jóhannes's poems, including one based on Jólakötturinn, around 1970.

=== Modern popularity ===
In 2008, the English-language online newspaper The Reykjavík Grapevine published an article about the Yule cat; this is considered partially responsible for the Yule cat gaining international recognition, and the story of the Jólaköttur was repeated and expanded upon in various other articles. In 2018, the city of Reykjavík set up a 5 m (16 ft) tall iron sculpture of the Yule cat as a Christmas decoration in the city's central square. In December 2023, a film about the Yule cat titled Þið kannist við... (lit. You Know..., localized into English as Krampuss) was released in Iceland.
