= Sléttuhlíð =

District in Skagafjörður, Iceland

- District
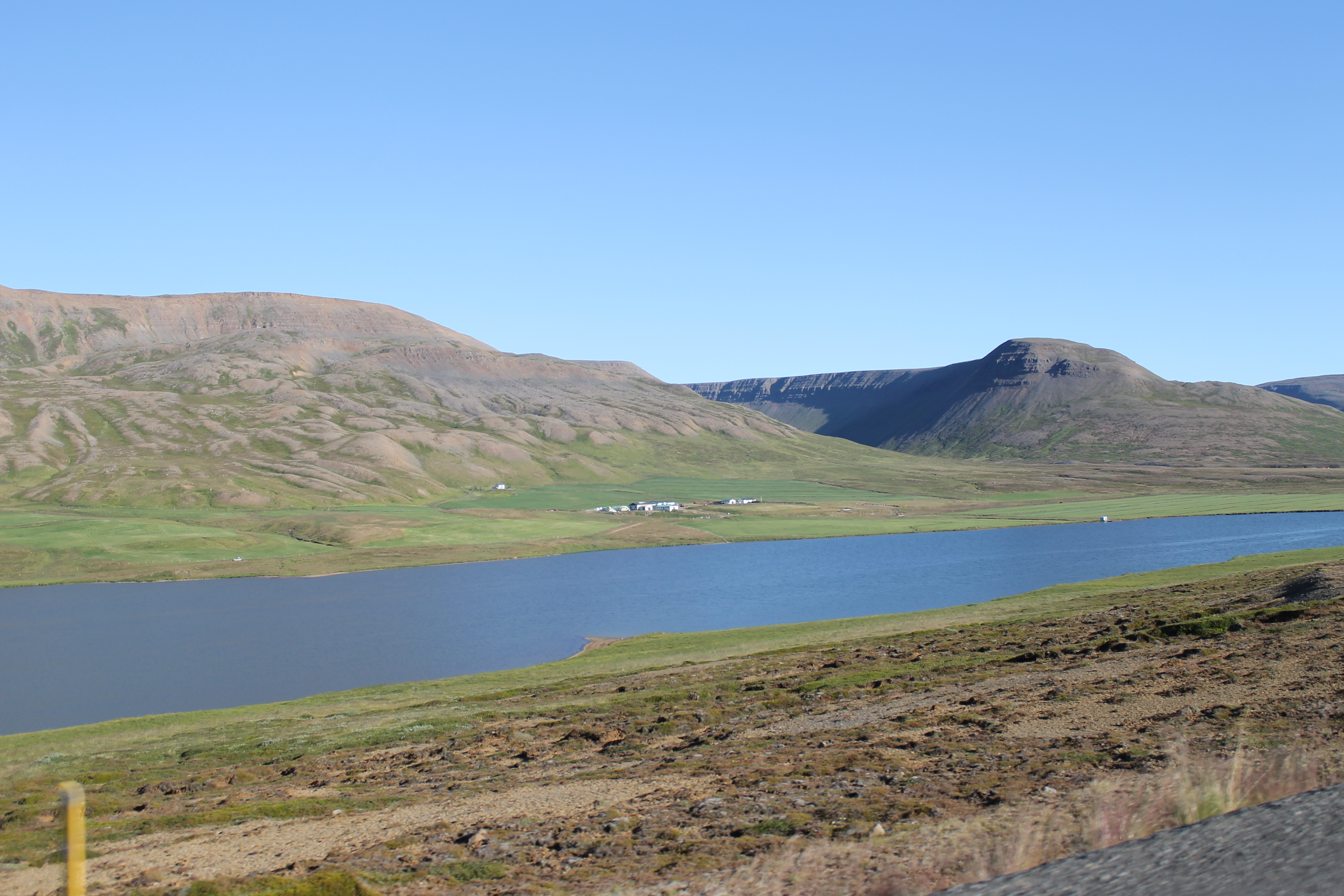
- The view over the lake Sléttuhlíðarvatn
- Interactive map of Sléttuhlíð
- Coordinates: 66°01′11″N 19°23′13″W
- Country: Iceland
- County: Skagafjörður
- Named for: Sléttuhlíð, a hill

Sléttuhlíð is a district on the east side of Skagafjörður, close to Höfðahólar and out towards the Stafá river. The coast there runs considerably toward the west. The mountain, however, curves rather toward the east so that the lowland widens significantly. Although from the western coast of Höfðaströnd the lowlands are level. Sléttuhlíð is a long hill, 173 meters tall, between two oblong lakes called Kappastaðavatn and the Sléttuhlíðarvatn. Between the hill and the mountains there is a low-lying dell, relatively lush, with several farms including the church site Fell. Hálfdan Narfason was a priest there centuries ago and was said to have been skilled in magic. To the west of Fell is the abandoned farm Fjall where Sölvi Helgason (also known as Sólon Íslandus) was born.

Two valleys lead into the mountain range a little ways from Sléttuhlíð. A little to the south is Hrolleifsdalur, which is said to be named after the explorer Hrolleifur, and is now completely deserted. There is also Skálárdalur, a valley that was never inhabited. The Skálá river runs from Skálárdalur and flows into Hrolleifsdalsá river, which meanders southward towards the sea through the countryside.

Sléttuhlíð was previously part of Fellshreppur and is now a part of Skagafjörður County.
