= Gröf á Höfðaströnd =

Town and church site in Skagafjörður, Iceland

- Gröf in Höfðaströnd
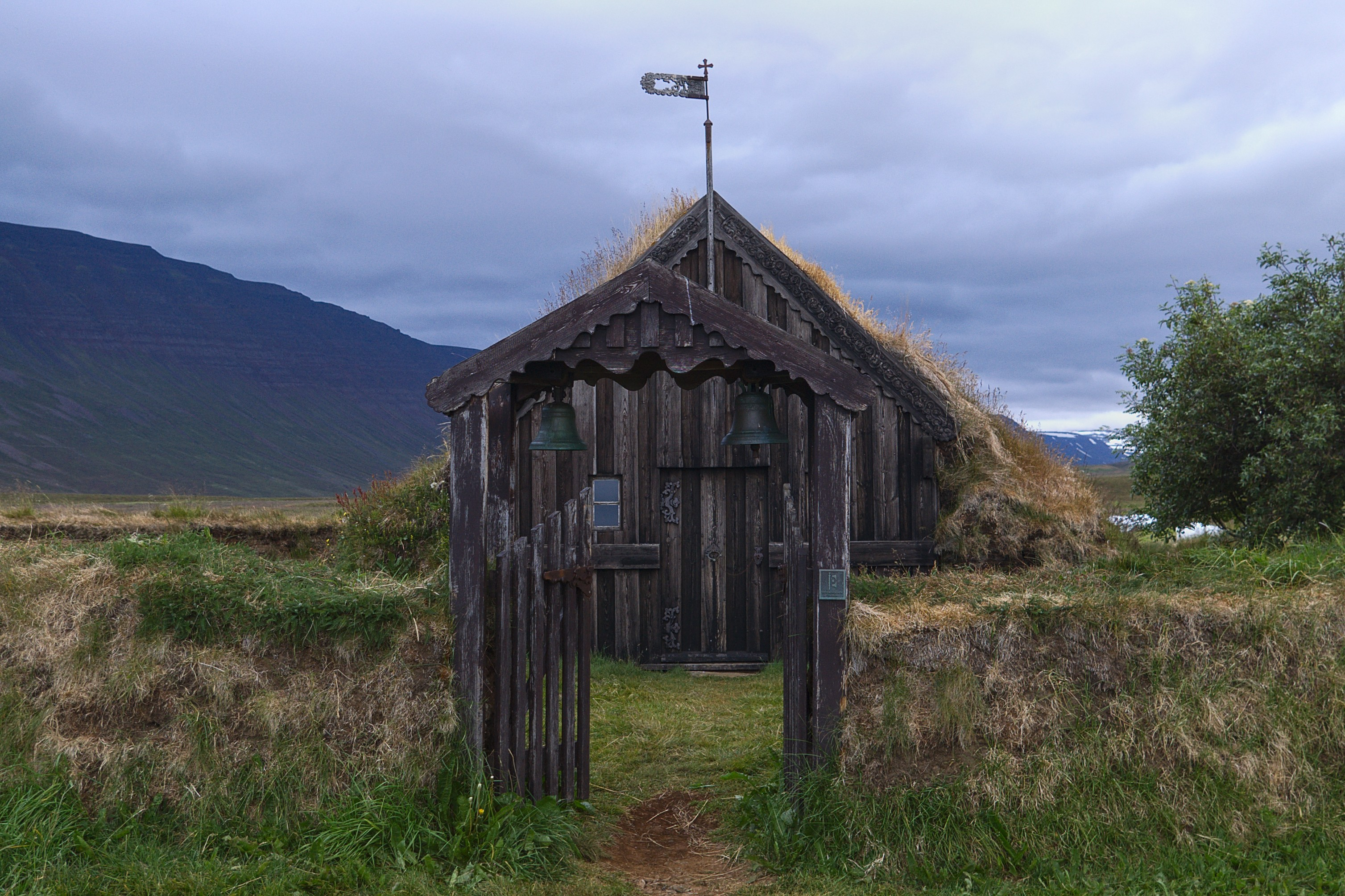
- Interactive map of Gröf á Höfðaströnd
- Country: Iceland
- County: Skagafjörður (municipality)

Gröf á Höfðaströnd (Gröf in Höfðaströnd) is the innermost town in Höfðaströnd on the eastern side of Skagafjörður, Iceland.

== History ==
The hymn writer Hallgrímur Pétursson was born there in 1614. In the 17th century, Gröf took on the role of the residence for bishops' widows; one of the widows who lived there the longest was Ragnheiður Jónsdóttir, widow of Bishop Gísli Þorláksson. Gísli, who died in 1684, was likely the one who had the church or chapel, which still stands in Gröf, built (or rebuilt) from the old church building. There has continuously been a Catholic chapel in Gröf, including into the Reformation.

== Church ==
Gröf's church is among the smallest and is the oldest in the country, according to its foundation, and it is the only stave church. Skagafjörður's leading craftsman in the 17th century Guðmundur Guðmundsson í Bjarnastaðahlíð in Vesturdalur valley, who made the baptismal font in the Hólar Cathedral, is considered to have adorned the church and was possibly one of the builders. The church was dismantled, as were many other churches, on orders from the King of Norway in a 1765 letter and it was long used as a storehouse. The church came into the care of the National Museum of Iceland in 1939 and was retrofitted around 1950; the wood turned out to be so rotten that all of it had to be replaced with new boards that were cut to exactly the same size as the old ones. The church was reconsecrated in 1953. The churchyard was, around the same time, refilled behind the ruins of the circular wall which were still just visible. The bell gate is new, but was built in the style of the church.
