= Hrolleifsdalur =

Valley in Skagafjörður, Iceland

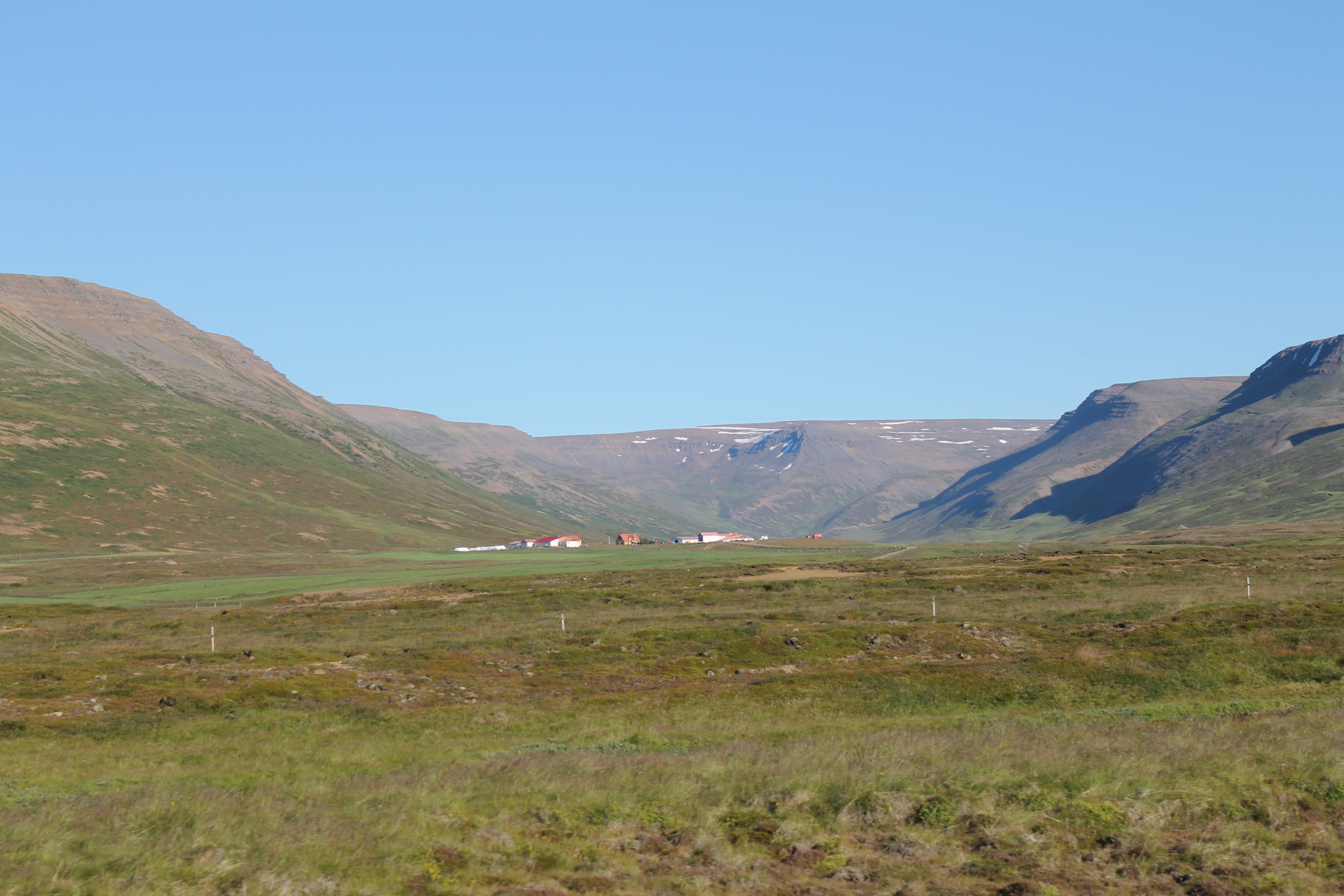
- The view into Hrolleifsdalur

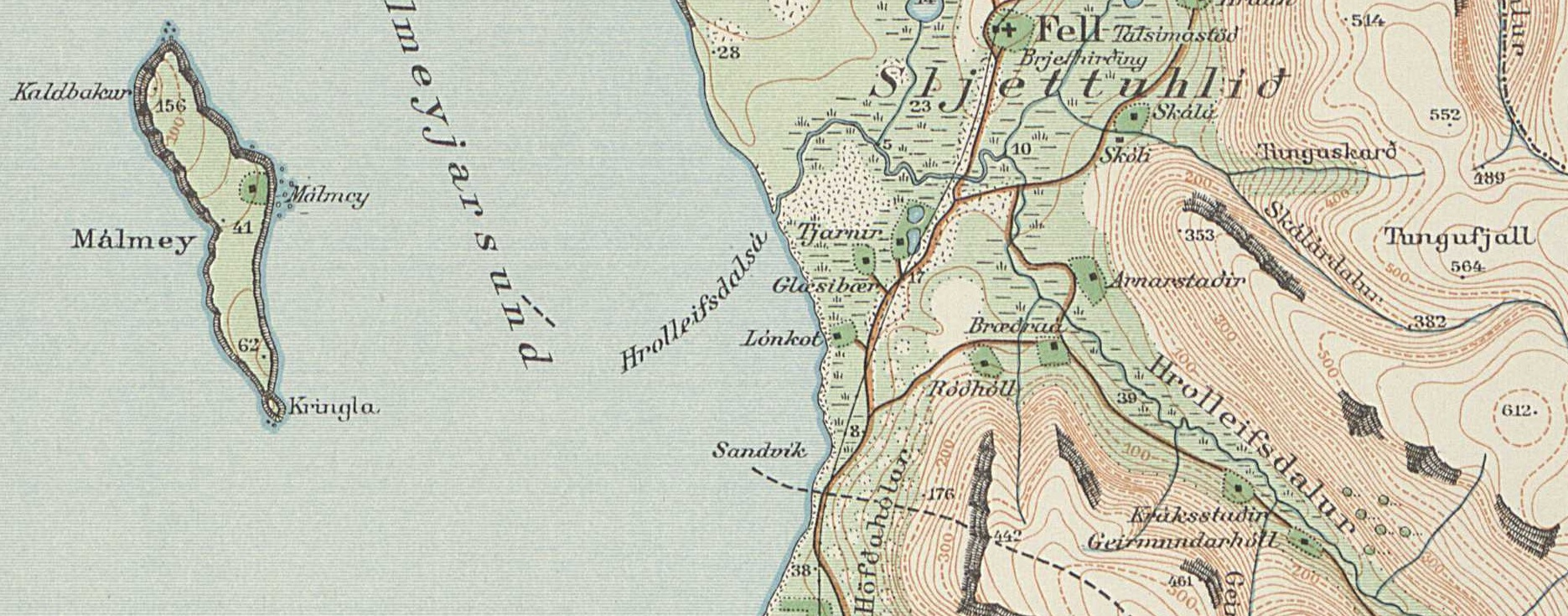

Naming
- English translation: Hrolleifur's valley

Geography
- Country: Iceland
- State/Province: Skagafjörður
- Coordinates: 66°0′28.001″N 19°20′3.998″W 65°59′43″N 19°18′55″W 66°0′0.554″N 19°19′46.646″W
- River: Hrolleifsdalsá

Hrolleifsdalur is a valley that leads from Sléttuhlíð on the east side of Skagafjörður, Iceland heading to the southeast end of Tröllaskagi mountain range. The valley is said to be named after the settler Hrolleifur mikli Arnhallsson. There were a few farms in Hrolleifsdalur, but they have all since been abandoned.

The Hrolleifsdalsá river runs through the valley and then into the ocean in the southern part of Sléttuhlíð. There are some remnants of the forests in the valley, the only ones which can be found in Skagafjörður, except for the ones in Vesturdalur, called the Geirmundarhólsskógur forest. Hrolleifsdalur has been protected for many years, but there have been difficulties because of many heavy snows in the valley.

There is a small amount of geothermal energy in Hrolleifsdalur and a lake that formed in a borehole on the land of the abandoned farm Bræðraá, which now leads to Hofsós.
