= Jóhannes úr Kötlum =

Icelandic author, poet and politician

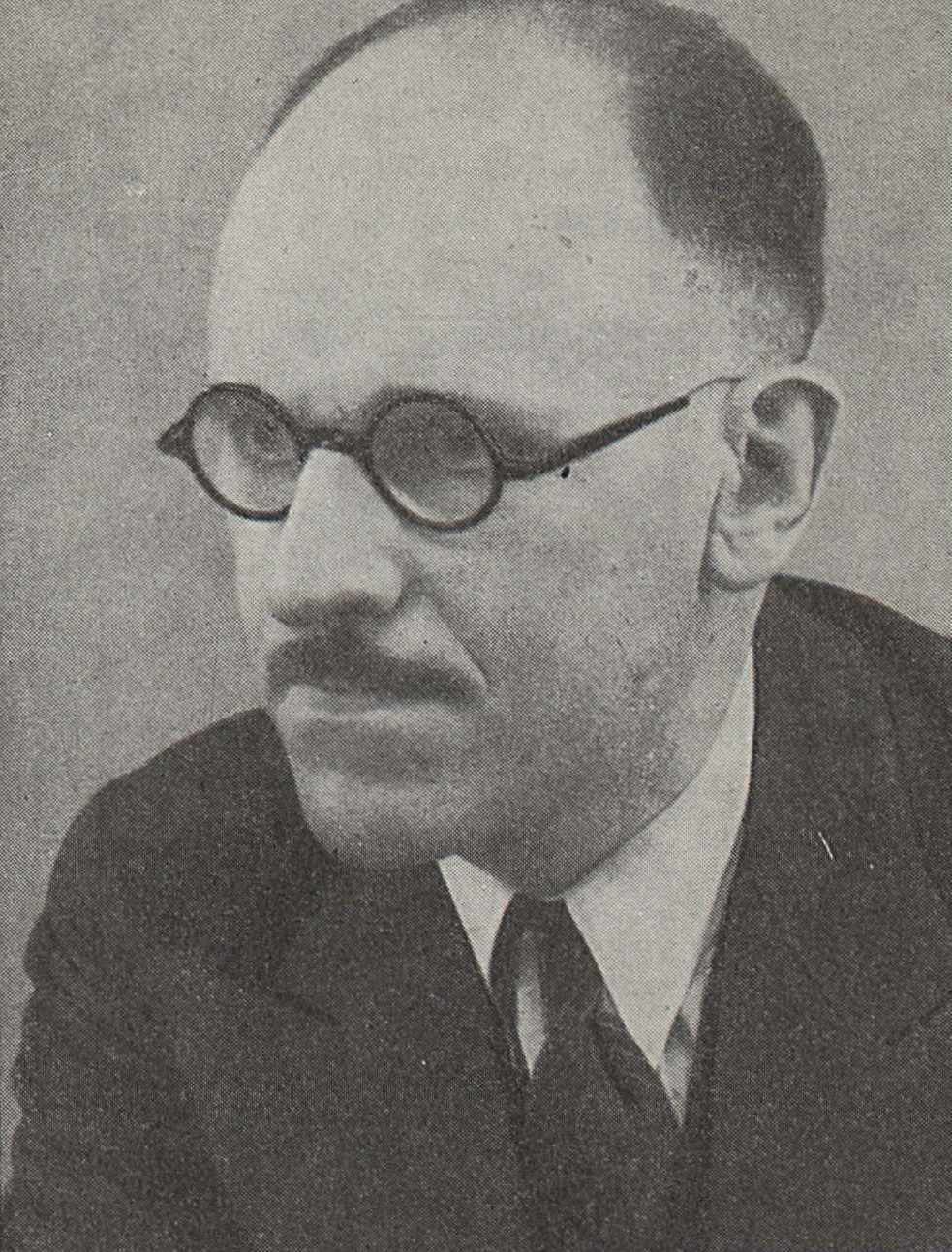
- Jóhannes in 1957
- Born: Jóhannes Bjarni Jónasson; 4 November 1899; Dalabyggð, Iceland
- Died: 27 April 1972 (aged 72); Reykjavík, Iceland

Jóhannes úr Kötlum (born Jóhannes Bjarni Jónasson; November 4, 1899 – April 27, 1972) was an Icelandic author/poet and a member of parliament. He is one of the most loved Icelandic poets – not least for his verse for children and how beautifully his words flow in the Icelandic language making them ideal for songs. His poems have been a constant inspiration for composers, songwriters and musicians in Iceland. More than two hundred songs and compositions have been written based on his poems, some of them performed by internationally acclaimed artists such as Björk performing the song "The Christmas Cat".

One of the salient figures of modern Icelandic poetry, Jóhannes mastered both the intricate traditional forms and the modern, but as an outspoken, idealistic and sometimes scathing critic of political institutions, he courted controversy and often drew the ire of political opponents. Jóhannes began his career as a neo-romantic poet in the 1920s, but later became a leading force among the radical poets of the depression era. After WWII he revolted against the traditional form, renewing his poetry through his originality and artistry. He was a spokesman for peace throughout his life and fought vigorously against Iceland's occupation by foreign armies.

== Life ==
Jóhannes was born in 1899 at Goddastaðir farmstead, near the head of Hvammsfjörður in the Dales of Northwestern Iceland. Despite poverty, Jóhannes was educated and graduated as a primary school teacher in 1921, a profession he practiced for more than a decade, first in the countryside and then in Reykjavík. From then on he worked as an editor and an author, first in Reykjavík and then in 1940 when he moved to Hveragerði, a small town in the South of Iceland which became known as the Artists Colony in the 1940s. He moved back to Reykjavík in 1959 where he lived from then on.

== Works ==
In 1932, Jóhannes úr Kötlum published his best-loved children's book: Jólin koma (Christmas is Coming – Verse for Children). One of the poems in the book, "The Yuletide-Lads," reintroduced Icelandic society to Yuletide folklore and established what is now considered the canonical thirteen Yuletide-lads or Yule Lads, their personalities and connection to other folkloric characters. Since then Christmas is Coming has been an integral part of Icelandic Christmas traditions and helped preserve age-old folklore in modern culture. A seasonal bestseller from the start, few other books have been reprinted as many times in Iceland.

== Awards and nominations ==
Jóhannes received awards for his celebratory verses in the Parliament Millennium Celebrations of 1930 and the Republic of Iceland Festivities in 1944. He was awarded the Silver Horse, the Icelandic Newspapers Literature Award, in 1970. He was nominated twice for the Nordic Council Literature Prize; in 1966 and 1973.

== Bibliography ==
=== Poetry ===
- 1926: Bí bí og blaka
- 1929: Álftirnar kvaka, poems
- 1932: Ég læt sem ég sofi, poems
- 1932: Jólin koma, poems (for children) - established what is now considered the canonical thirteen Yule Lads
- 1933: Ömmusögur (for children)
- 1935: Samt mun ég vaka
- 1937: Hrímhvita móðir
- 1939: Hart er í heimi
- 1940: Eilífðar smáblóm
- 1941: Bakkabræður (for children)
- 1945: Sól tér sortna
- 1946: Ljóðið um Labbakút (for children)
- 1949: Ljóðasafn I-II selected poems
- 1952: Sóleyjarkvæði
- 1952: Hlið hins himneska friðar
- 1955: Sjödægra
- 1959: Vísur Ingu Dóru (for children)
- 1962: Óljóð
- 1964: Tregaslagur
- 1966: Mannssonurinn
- 1970: Ný og nið
- 1972-76: Ljóðasafn I-VIII, selected poems
- 1984: Ljóðasafn IX, selected poems
- 1987: Saga af Suðurnesjum (for children)
- 1988: Segja vil ég sögu af sveinunum þeim (for children)
- 2001: Jólin okkar (for children)
- 2010: Ljóðaúrval, selected poems

=== Novels ===
- 1934: Og björgin klofnuðu
- 1943: Verndarenglarnir
- 1949: Dauðsmannsey
- 1950: Siglingin mikla
- 1951: Frelsisálfan

=== Stories ===
- 1938: Fuglinn segir (for children)

=== Essays ===
- 1958: Roðasteinninn og ritfrelsið
- 1965: Vinaspegill

=== Translations ===
- 1934: Kak I (with Sigurður Thorlacius) Vilhjalmur Stefansson and Violet Irwin
- 1935: Kak II (with Sigurður Thorlacius) Vilhjalmur Stefansson and Violet Irwin
- 1935: Mamma litla I (with Sigurður Thorlacius) Élise de Pressensé
- 1936: Mamma litla II (with Sigurður Thorlacius) Élise de Pressensé
- 1938: Himalajaförin (with Sigurður Thorlacius) Queling
- 1946: Salamöndrustríðið Karel Čapek
- 1946: Fimm synir Howard Fast
- 1948: Annarlegar tungur (various selected poets)
- 1955: Saga af sönnum manni Boris Nikolaevich Polevoĭ
- 1957: Vegurinn til lífsins I Anton Semyonovich Makarenko
- 1957: Vegurinn til lífsins II Anton Semyonovich Makarenko
- 1958: Frú Lúna í snörunni Agnar Mykle
