= Fell í Sléttuhlíð =

Town and church site in Skagafjörður, Iceland

Fell
- Town
- Fell í Sléttuhlíð
- Interactive map of Fell
- Coordinates: 66°1′57.544″N 19°21′59.360″W
- Country: Iceland
- County: Skagafjörður
- District: Sléttuhlíð
- Time zone: UTC+0

Fell (or Fell í Sléttuhlíð) was a farm and church site in Sléttuhlíð in Skagafjörður, Iceland. It was previously a parsonage, but it was shut down in 1891. Fell's current church was built in 1881–1882.

The most well-known priest in Fell was Hálfdan Narfason, who was said to be very skilled in magic. He died in Fell in 1568 and had at that time been the longest serving priest there. Later, Erlendur Guðmundsson (died 1641) and his son Guðmundur Erlendsson (born around 1595, died 1670), were priests in Fell for a little over 80 consecutive years from 1585 to 1668. Quite a lot is recorded of Guðmundur's poetry, including psalms and other spiritual poetry, historical poems, commemorative poems, and more.

The folklorist Ólafur Davíðsson was born in Fell in 1863.
