= Icelandic Christmas folklore =

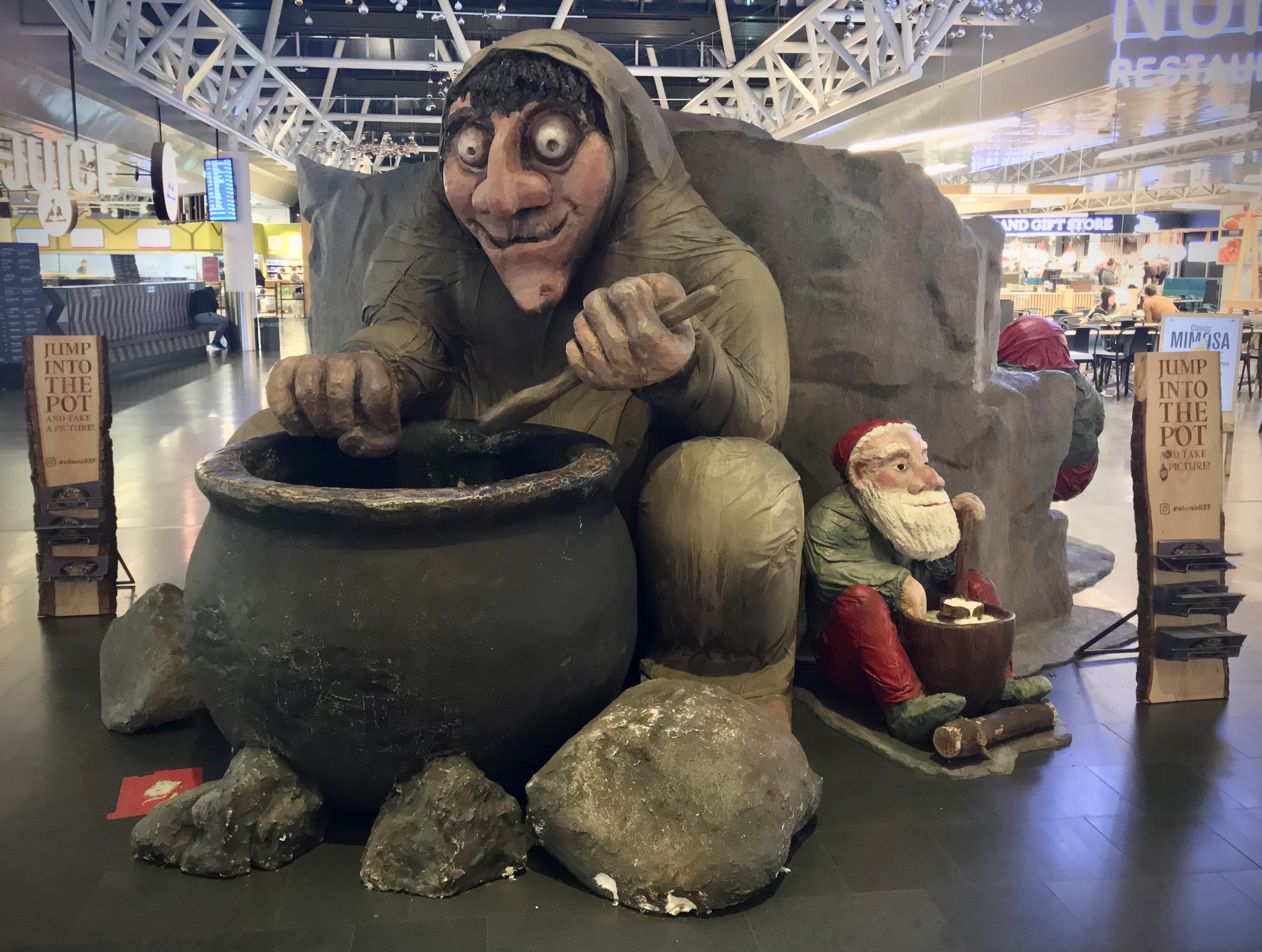
Grýla and Skyrgámur (a Yule Lad fond of skyr) depicted in a sculpture at Keflavík International Airport

Icelandic Christmas folklore depicts mountain-dwelling characters and monsters who come to town during Christmas. The stories are directed at children and are used to scare them into good behavior. The folklore includes mischievous pranksters who leave gifts at night and monsters who eat disobedient children.

The figures are depicted as living together as a family in a cave and include:

- Grýla is an ogress with an appetite for the flesh of mischievous children, whom she cooks in a large pot. Her husband, Leppalúði, is lazy and mostly stays at home in their cave.
- The Yule Cat is a huge and vicious cat that lurks about the snowy countryside during Christmas time (Yule) and eats people who have not received any new clothes to wear before Christmas Eve.
- The Yule Lads are the sons of Grýla and Leppalúði. They are a group of 13 mischievous pranksters who steal from or harass the population; they all have descriptive names that convey their favorite way of harassing. They come to town one by one during the last 13 nights before Yule. They leave small gifts in shoes that children have placed on windowsills, but if the children have been disobedient, they instead leave a rotten potato in the shoe.

These Christmas-related folktales first appeared around the 17th century and displayed some variation based on region and age. In modern times, these characters have taken on slightly more benevolent roles.

== History ==
=== Origins ===
The first mention of the Yule Lads can be found in the 17th-century "Poem of Grýla". Grýla had appeared in older tales as a troll, but had not been linked to Christmas before. She is described as a hideous being who is the mother of the gigantic Yule Lads, a menace to children.

Early on, the number and depiction of the Yule Lads varied greatly depending on location. They were used to frighten children into good behaviour, similar to the bogeyman. The King of Denmark objected to their use as a disciplinary tool. In 1746, the use of the Yule Lads myths to overly instill fear in children was officially banned, leading to the myths being made more benign.

In the late 18th century, a poem mentions 13 of them. In the mid-19th century, author Jón Árnason drew inspiration from the Brothers Grimm and began collecting folktales. His 1862 collection is the first mention of the names of the Yule Lads.

In 1932, the poem "Yule Lads" was published as a part of the popular poetry book Christmas is Coming (Jólin koma) by Icelandic poet Jóhannes úr Kötlum. The poem was popular and established what is now considered the canonical 13 Yule Lads, their names, and their personalities.

== Grýla and Leppalúði ==
Grýla (Note: Icelandic: Grýla; IPA: [ˈkriːla]) is an ogress, first mentioned in 13th-century texts such as Íslendinga saga and Sverris saga, but not explicitly connected with Christmas until the 17th century. She is enormous, and her appearance is repulsive.

Grýla is also mentioned in the Skáldskaparmál section of the 13th-century Prose Edda by Snorri Sturluson. There, she is mentioned only by name in a list of names of "troll-wives". No further description of her is provided in the text.

The oldest poems about Grýla describe her as a parasitic beggar. She walks around asking parents to give her their disobedient children. Her plans can be thwarted by giving her food or chasing her away. Originally, she lived in a small cottage, but in later poems, she appears to have been forced out of town and into a remote cave.

Current-day Grýla can detect children who are misbehaving year-round. She comes from the mountains during Christmas time to search nearby towns for her meal. She leaves her cave, hunts children, and carries them home in her giant sack. She devours children as her favourite snack. Her favorite dish is a stew of naughty kids, for which she has an insatiable appetite. According to legend, a shortage of food for Grýla never occurs.

According to folklore, Grýla has been married three times. Her third husband Leppalúði (Note: Icelandic: Leppalúði; IPA: [ˈlehpaˌluːðɪ]) is said to be living with her in their cave in the Dimmuborgir lava fields, with the big, black Yule Cat and their sons. Leppalúði is lazy and mostly stays at home in their cave. Grýla supposedly has dozens of children with her previous husbands, but they are rarely mentioned nowadays.

== Yule Cat ==
The Yule Cat, known as Jólakötturinn, (Note: Icelandic: Jólakötturinn; IPA: [ˈjouːlaˌkʰœhtʏrɪn]) is a huge and vicious cat that is described as lurking about the snowy countryside during Christmas time and eating people who have not received any new clothes to wear before Christmas Eve. He is the house pet of Grýla and her sons.

== Yule Lads ==
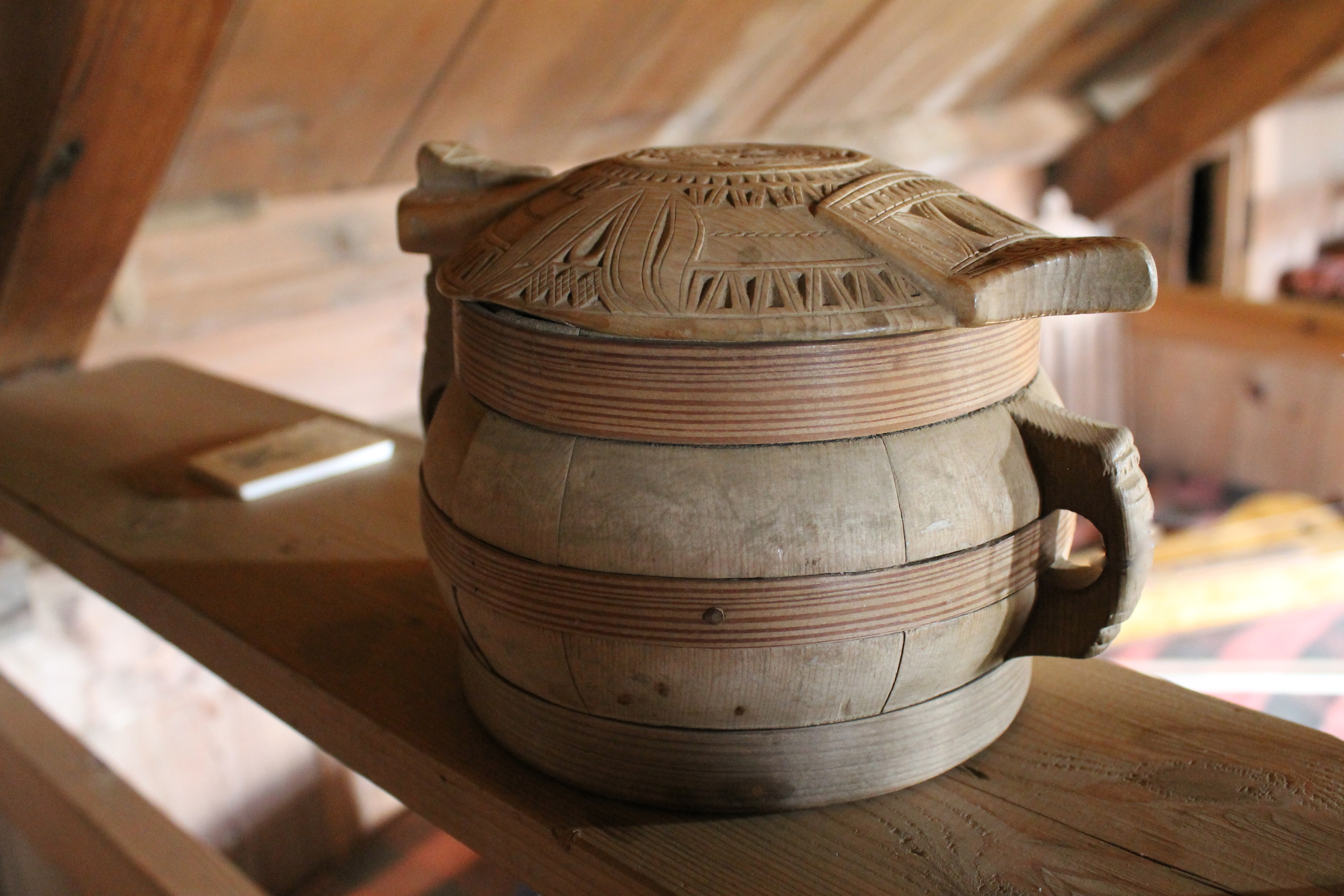
A wooden askur, a lidded food bowl favored by the Bowl-Licker lad.

The Yule Lads (Note: Icelandic: Jólasveinarnir; IPA: [ˈjouːlaˌsveiːna(r)tnɪr̥]) (sometimes known as Yuletide-lads or Yulemen) are the sons of Grýla and Leppalúði. They are a group of 13 mischievous pranksters who steal from or otherwise harass the population. Each has a descriptive name to convey his favourite way of causing mischief. They arrive one by one over the 13 nights leading up to Christmas or Yule. They leave small gifts in shoes that children place on windowsills, although disobedient children will instead find a rotten potato in their shoes.

Much like their mother, the Yule Lads were originally portrayed by the Icelandic folklorist Jón Árnason not as gift-givers, but as kidnappers of children who misbehaved during the Christmas season, along with their usual prankster activities.

In modern times, the Yule Lads have also been depicted in a more benevolent role comparable to Santa Claus and other related figures. They are generally portrayed wearing late-medieval Icelandic clothing, but are sometimes shown in the costume traditionally worn by Santa Claus, especially at children's events.

=== List of Yule Lads ===
Each Yule Lad arrives individually and stays for a visit of 13 days, starting 12 December. Once the first Lad departs on Christmas Day, the rest follow suit each day through 6 January.

Thirteen canonical Yule Lads with their associated dates
Icelandic name	English translation	Description	Arrival	Departure
Stekkjarstaur	Sheepcote Clod	Harasses sheep, but is impaired by his stiff peglegs	12 December	25 December
Giljagaur	Gully Gawk	Hides in gullies, waiting for an opportunity to sneak into the cowshed and steal milk	13 December	26 December
Stúfur	Stubby	Abnormally short, steals pans for the food baked to the bottoms and brims	14 December	27 December
Þvörusleikir	Spoon Licker	Steals wooden spoons being used for cooking, extremely thin from malnutrition	15 December	28 December
Pottaskefill	Pot Scraper	Steals pots to scrape out the leftovers	16 December	29 December
Askasleikir	Bowl Licker	Hides under beds awaiting the wooden food bowls placed on the floor	17 December	30 December
Hurðaskellir	Door Slammer	Enjoys slamming doors, especially during the night, waking up the household	18 December	31 December
Skyrgámur	Skyr Gobbler	Has a great affinity for skyr, a regional style of yogurt	19 December	1 January
Bjúgnakrækir	Sausage Swiper	Hides in the rafters and snatches sausages that are being smoked	20 December	2 January
Gluggagægir	Window Peeper	A snoop who looks through windows in search of things to steal	21 December	3 January
Gáttaþefur	Doorway Sniffer	Has an abnormally large nose and an acute sense of smell, which he uses to locate leaf bread (laufabrauð)	22 December	4 January
Ketkrókur	Meat Hook	Uses a hook to steal meat	23 December	5 January
Kertasníkir	Candle Beggar	Follows children to steal their precious candles, made of tallow and thus edible	24 December	6 January

=== Variations ===
Prior to the popularization of the 13 Yule Lads, regional lore offered variations on their mythos. Some were said to be sons of Grýla; others were her brothers. While each of them is still associated with a characteristic prank, some stories describe only nine Yule Lads. Most of the obscure Yule Lads fall into three groups: those who steal food, those who like to play tricks or harass, and those who seem to be a delusion from nature (for example, Gully Gawk, who just hides in gullies). A folk tale particular to eastern Iceland described the Yule Lads originating from the ocean rather than the mountains. One rare nursery rhyme mentions two female Yule pranksters who steal melted fat by stuffing it up their noses or putting it in socks.
