= Deildardalur =

Valley in Skagafjörður, Iceland

Deilardalur
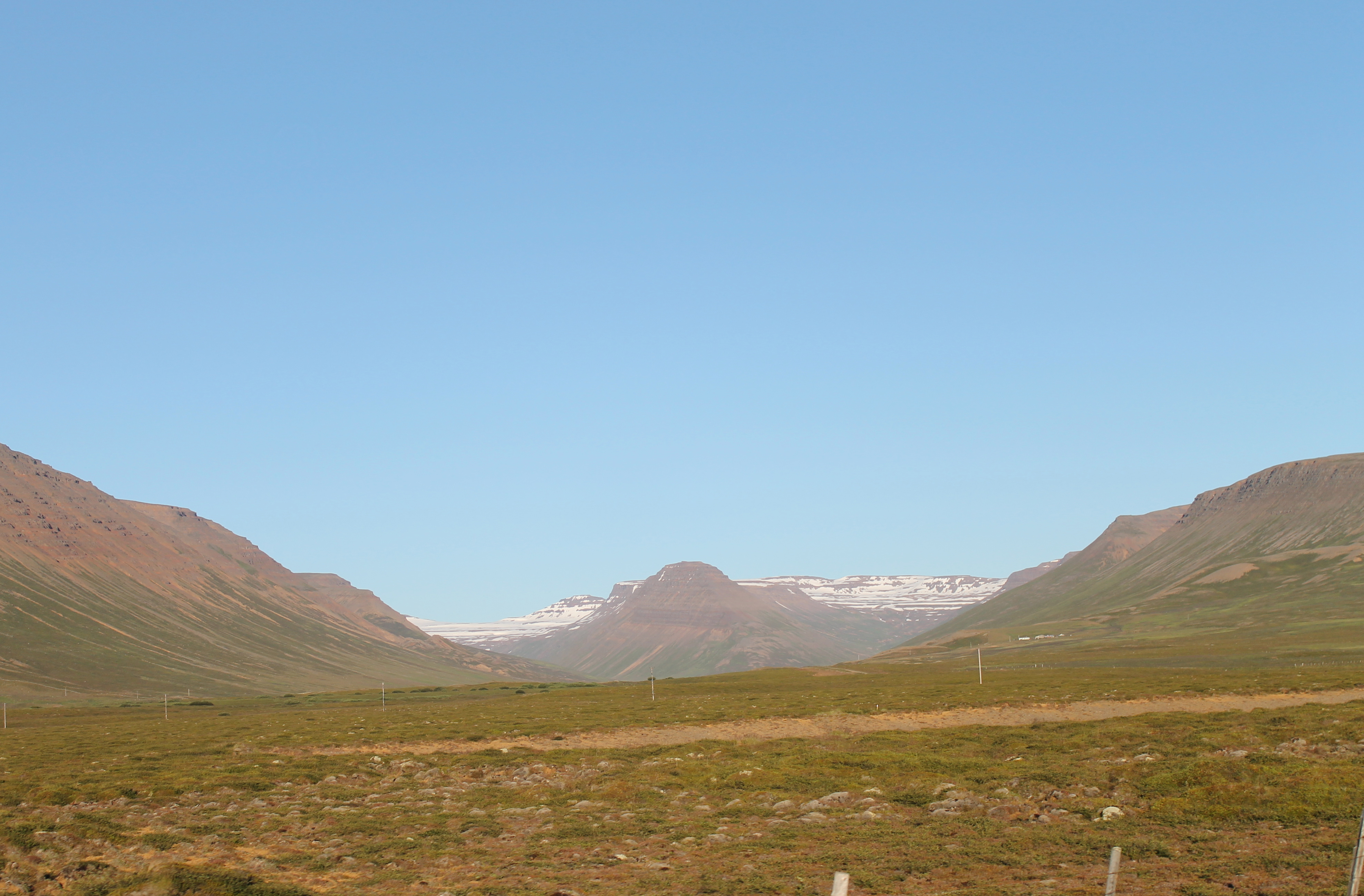
- Deildardalur valley

Geography
- Country: Iceland
- State/Province: Skagafjörður
- District: Höfðaströnd
- Coordinates: 65°51′42.520″N 19°16′4.008″W
- River: Grafará
- Interactive map of Deilardalur

Deildardalur is a valley in on the eastern side of Skagafjörður, Iceland, leading up from Höfðaströnd to the southeast behind mountains of Óslandshlíð. A little farther into the area, it divides in two: Seljadalur (also called Austurdalur), and Vesturdalur. Sharply wedged between them is Tungufjall mountain. The river Deildará, called Grafará further down, runs through the valley. Deildardalsjökull glacier is on the valley floor.

There are a few farms in the valley. A new corral was put in use in Deilardalur as of September 2007, and the valley has quite a lot of pasture land for summer grazing in Óslandshlíð and up to Höfðaströnd.
