= Hof in Höfðaströnd =

Town and church site in Skagafjörður, Iceland

Hof in Höfðaströnd Hof á Höfðaströnd
- Town
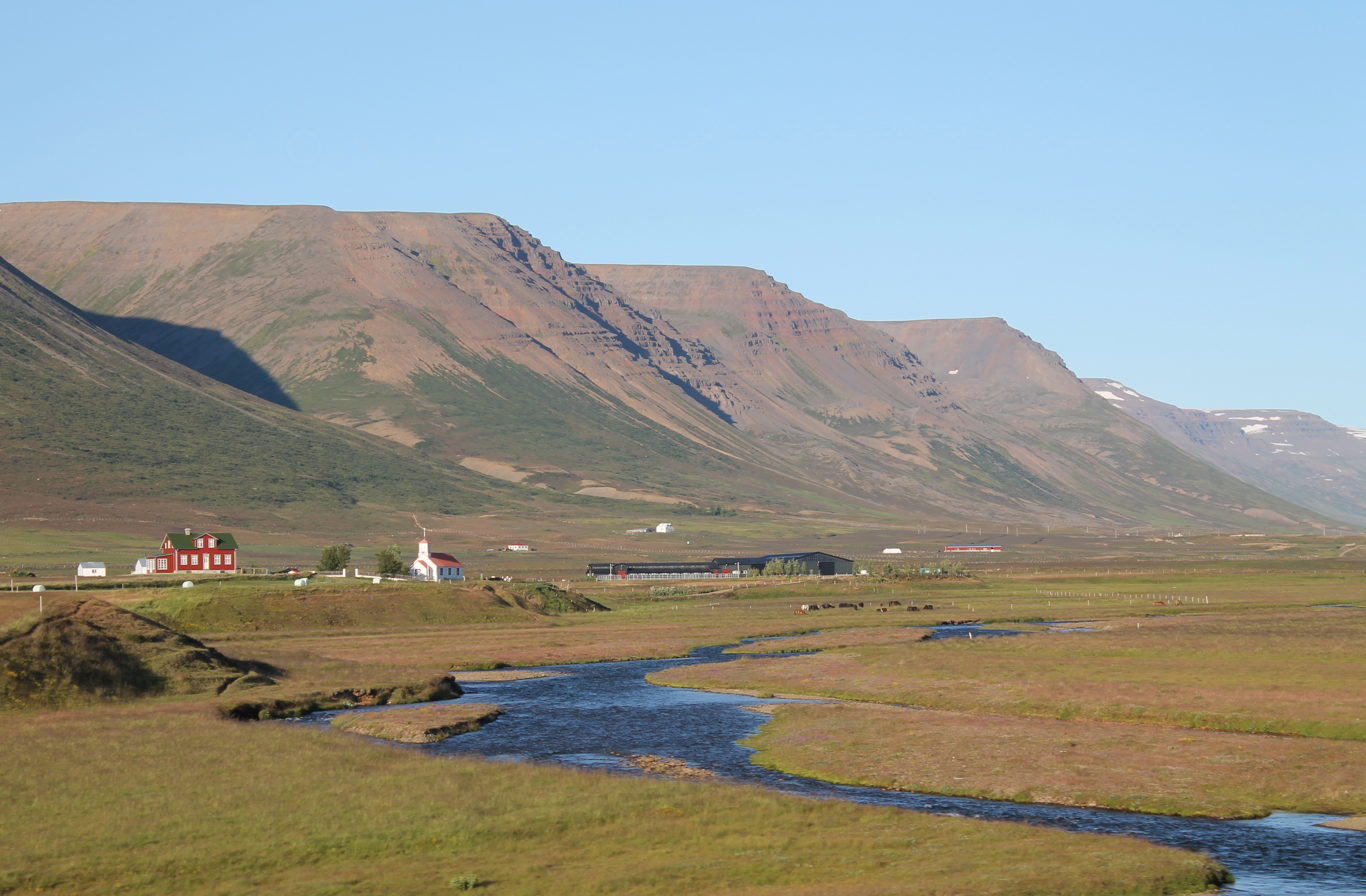
- Hof á Höfðaströnd
- Country: Iceland
- County: Skagafjörður
- Time zone: UTC+0

Hof in Höfðaströnd is a town and church site in Skagafjörður, Iceland, a little ways up from Hofsós. It was previously a parsonage. The Hof church was built from wood between the years of 1868 and 1870 and it is a protected building.

Hof was a manor where many magistrates lived in previous centuries. This included:

- Brandur Jónsson, lawyer (died 1494)
- Hrafn Brandsson the younger, who lived in Hof before he obtained Glaumbær from Teitur Þorleifsson
- Magnús Björnsson, lawyer and grandson of Jón Arason
- Skúli Magnússon, later a treasurer, also lived in Hof the first year that he was the sheriff of Skagafjörður

Pálmi Jónsson, founder of Hagkaup, was born in Hof on June 3, 1923, and was brought up there. His daughter Lilja bought Hof and undertook a considerable number of projects there including building a house designed by Studio Granda, which won a design award in 2007. It was also nominated for the European Union Architectural Awards.
