= Flókadalur (Borgarfirði) =

Valley in Iceland

Coordinates: 64°36′N 21°28′W

Flókadalur (Icelandic pronunciation: [ˈflouːkaˌtaːlʏr̥]) is a valley and region in Borgarfjarðarsýsla. The valley lies between Reykholtdalur and Lundarreykjadalur, and through it flow the rivers Flókadalsá and Geirsá.
