= Flókadalur (Skagafjörður) =

Valley in Skagafjörður, Iceland

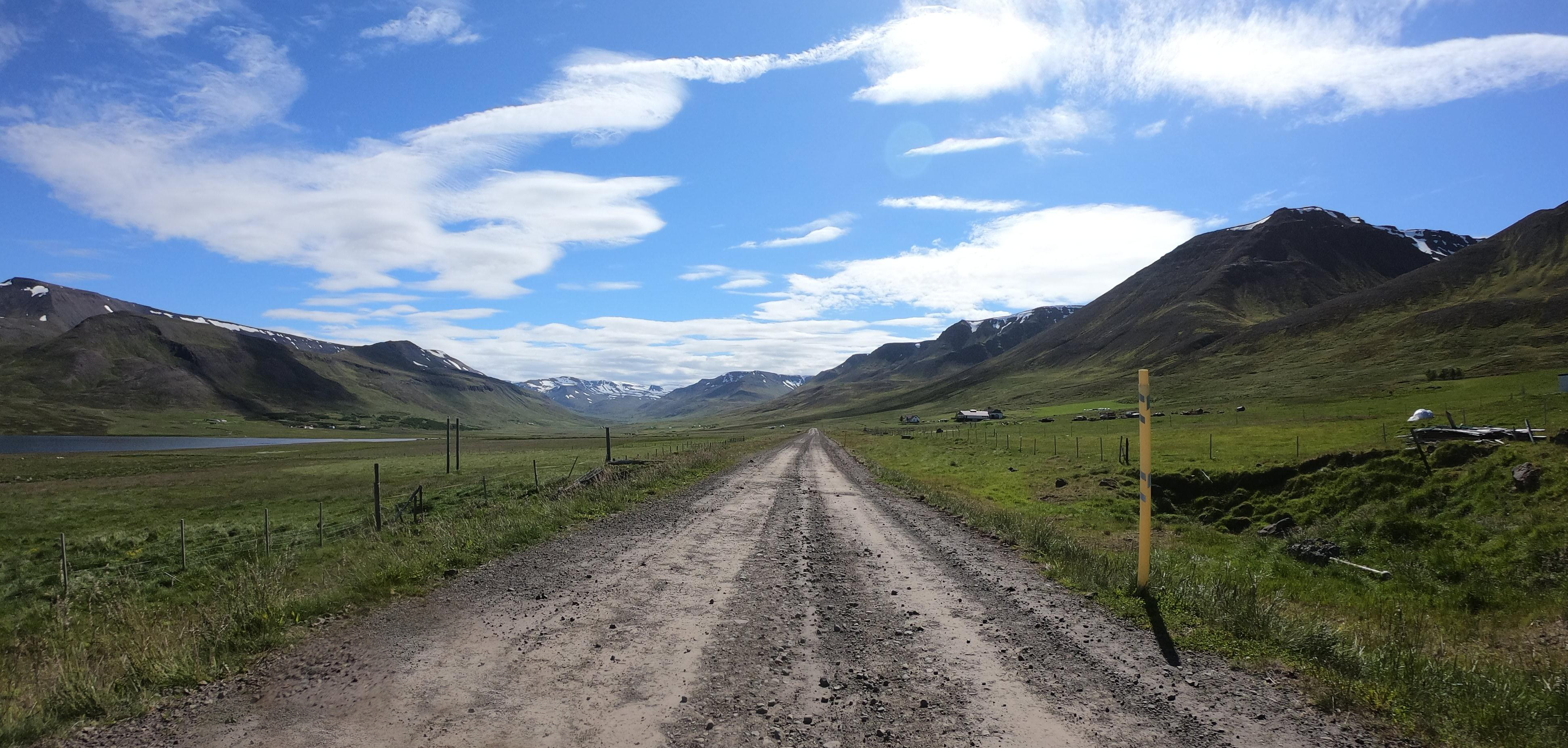
- Flókadalur

Naming
- English translation: Flóki's valley

Geography
- Country: Iceland
- State/Province: Skagafjörður
- Coordinates: 65°59′51″N 19°9′4″W 66°1′37.880″N 19°9′3.514″W
- River: Flókadalsá
- Lake: Hópsvatn
- Interactive map of Flókadalur

Flókadalur (Icelandic pronunciation: [ˈflouːkaˌtaːlʏr̥]) is both a valley and region in Skagafjarðarsýsla that was named after Flóki Vilgerðarson, who is said to have settled the land there when he returned to Iceland, and gave the land its name.

In front of Flókadalur is the lake Hópsvatn [ˈhoupsˌvahtn̥], which is separated from the sea by a low, gravelly isthmus. Inside the valley is Flókadalsvatn [ˈflouːkaˌtalsˌvahtn̥]. Through Flókadalur runs Flókadalsá [ˈflouːkaˌtalsˌauː]. Several towns are in the valley, which is grassy but snowy in the winter.
