= Þórðarhöfði =

Headland in Skagafjörður, Iceland

- Headland
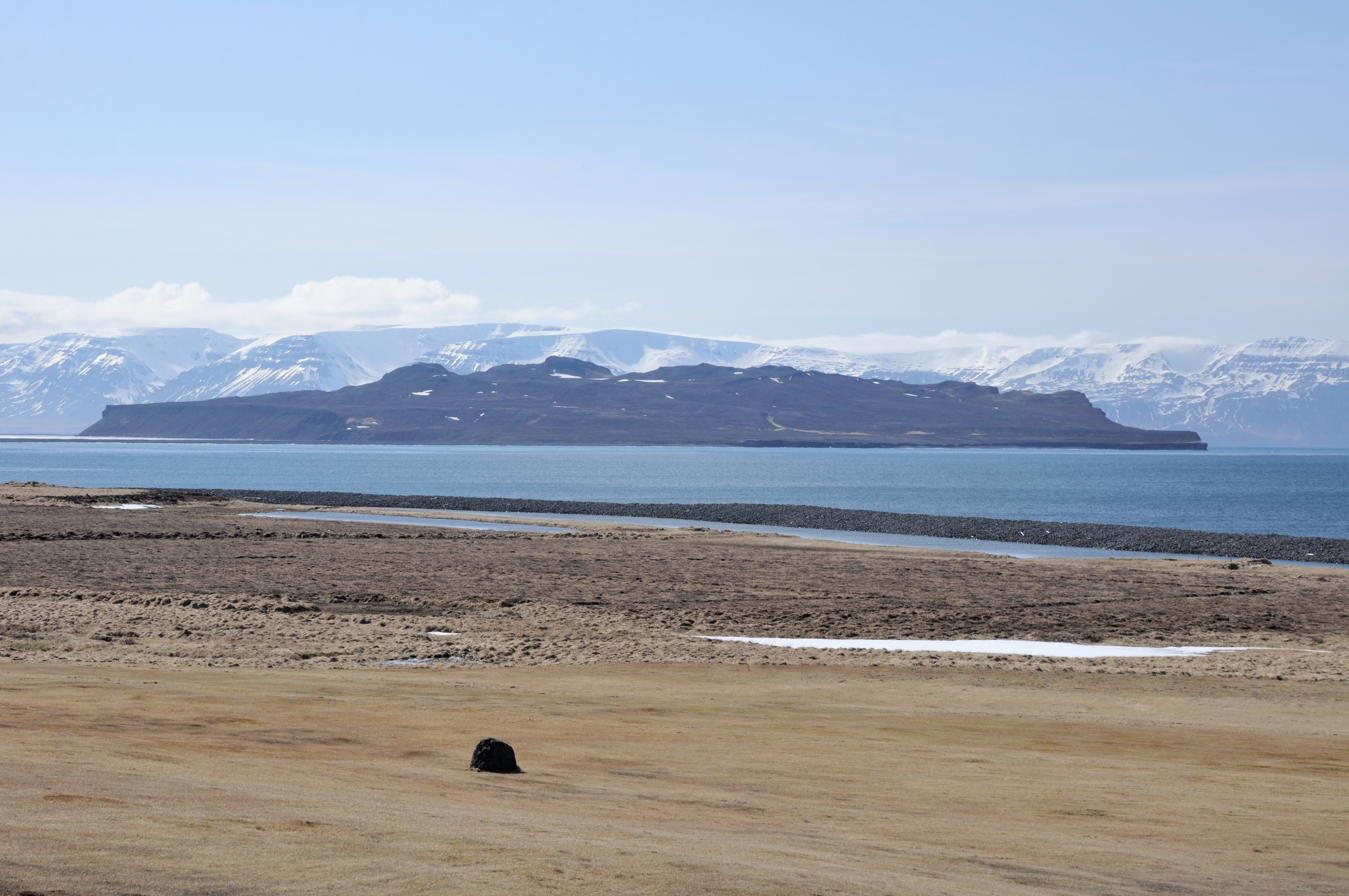
- Þórðarhöfði
- Coordinates: 65°57′39.964″N 19°29′22.628″W
- Location: Höfðaströnd, Skagafjörður, Iceland
- Formed by: Volcanic eruption

Dimensions
  - Height: 202 meters (622 feet)

Þórðarhöfði in Höfðaströnd is a 202-meter-tall rocky headland that runs toward the eastern side of Skagafjörður directly north of Hofsós. At first glance, the headland seems like an island but it is connected to the mainland. Two low isthmuses, Höfðamöl and Bæjarmöl, connect it to the land and there a is a large, 10-kilometer squared coastal lagoon between them called Höfðavatn, where there is excellent fishing for arctic char. In the early 20th century, the poet Jóhann Sigurjónsson proposed that an ocean liner harbor be built, but it did not happen.

Þórðarhöfði is the ruins of an old volcanic eruption. Basalt rock formations are located in the stone, and these are best seen from the sea.
