= Hálfdan Narfason =

Icelandic priest

Hálfdan Narfason (died 1568), was an Icelandic priest and Galdrmaster. He is known in Icelandic folklore, where he is the subject of many folksagas about his alleged magical performances.
