= Höfðaströnd =

Coastal area near Hofsós in Skagafjörður, Iceland

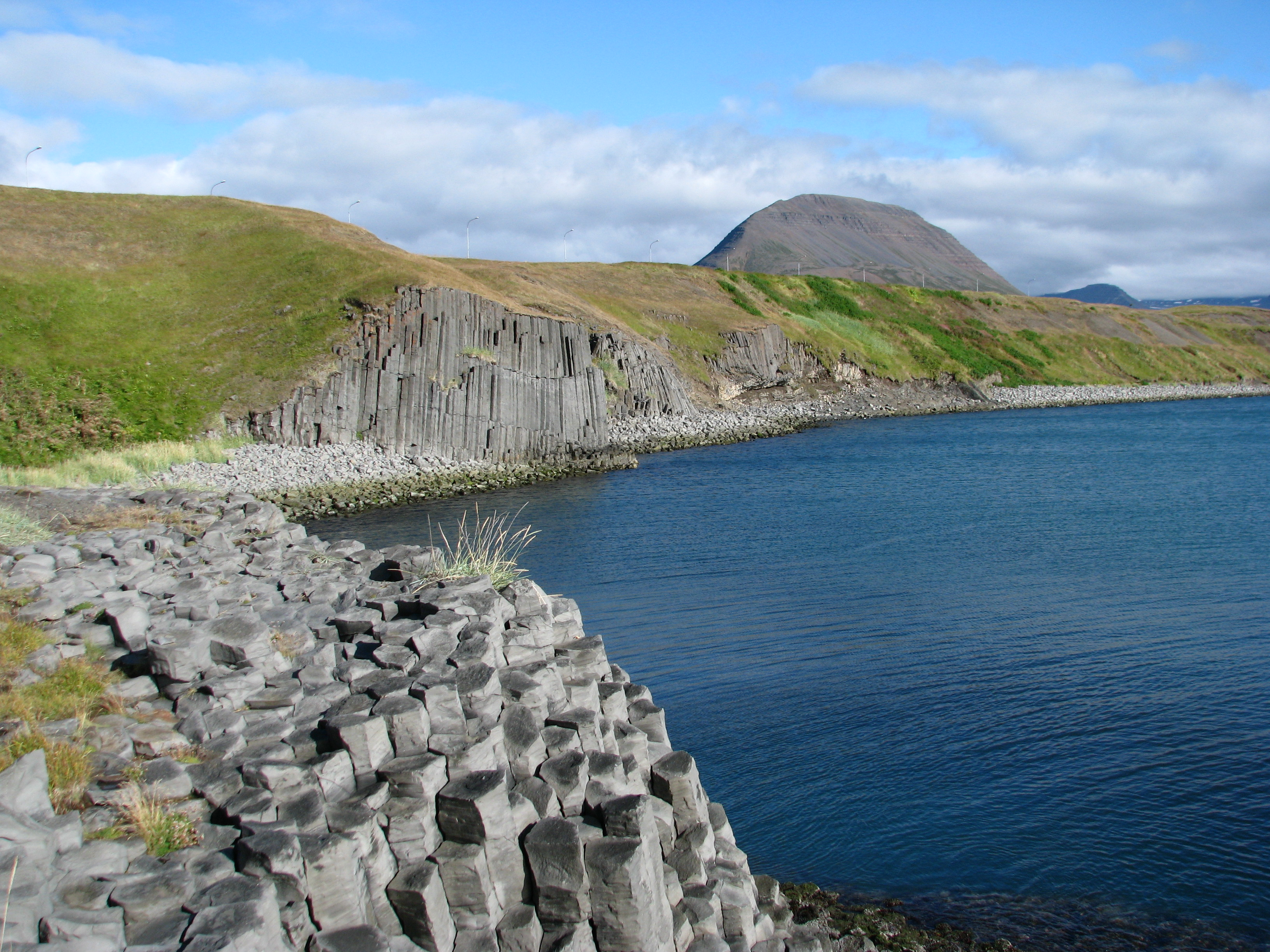
- Columnar basalt on the shore of Hofsós
- Interactive map of Höfðaströnd
- Country: Iceland
- County: Skagafjörður (municipality)
- Named after: Þórðarhöfði
- Farms: Farms: Gröf, Höfði, Bær, Hof in Höfðaströnd

Höfðaströnd is a region on the coast around Hofsós on the eastern side of Skagafjörður, Iceland. Its southernmost farm is Gröf, and the closest to the sea is Höfði. The region is named after Þórðarhöfði, which is a predominant feature of the landscape. Within Höfðaströnd is Höfðavatn, Skagafjörður's biggest lake, which is actually a coastal lagoon.

== History ==
There has long been a considerable amount of fishing based out of Höfðaströnd, both from Hofsós and from Bæjarkletta in Bær in Höfðaströnd, where there were workman's cottages. People there lived on fishing and fowling in Drangey, in addition to certain lichens. The area's general store was in Hofsós in Höfðaströnd since 1600, when Kolkuós's port facilities deteriorated dramatically, and up until the end of the 19th century, when Sauðárkrókur became Skagafjörður's principal commercial area. There were also shops in Grafarós from around 1840 until 1915.

Höfðaströnd was previously a part of Hofshreppur but has belonged to Skagafjörður County since the area's hreppurs unified. There are two church sites in Höfðaströnd, Hof and Gröf, where there is an old chapel dating to the latter part of the 18th century that was re-consecrated in 1953. There has been considerable construction in Höfðaströnd in recent years in, including, for example the Bær Art Center.
