= Höfðavatn =

Lake in Skagafjörður, Iceland

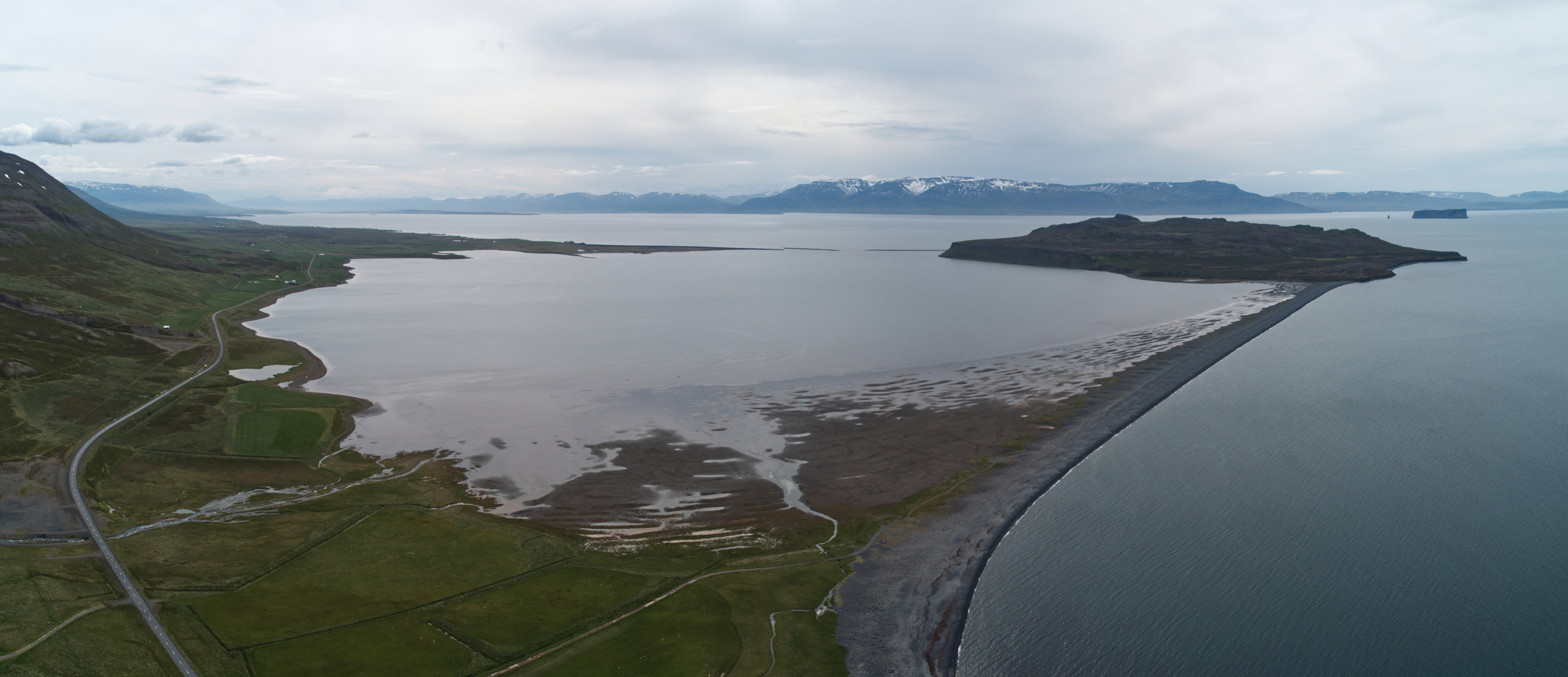
- Höfðavatn

- Location within Iceland
- Location: Skagafjörður
- Coordinates: 65°57′40″N 19°26′35″W
- Basin countries: Iceland
- Surface area: 10 km^{2} (3.9 sq mi)
- Average depth: 6.4 m (21 ft)
- Max. depth: 3.9 m (13 ft)
- Settlements: Hofsós

Höfðavatn (Icelandic pronunciation: [ˈhœvðaˌvahtn̥]) is a lagoon-like lake in northern Iceland. It is located in the municipality of Skagafjörður.

== Geography ==
Höfðavatn lies at the fjord of Skagafjörður about 7 km north of the village of Hofsós.

The surface of the Höfðavatn is about 10 km^{2}; the maximum depth is 6.4 m, the middle depth 3.9 M. North of the lake lies the Málmeyjarsund [ˈmaulmˌeiːjarˌsʏnt], west of Þórðarhöfði [ˈθourðarˌhœvðɪ].
