= Hofsós =

- Village
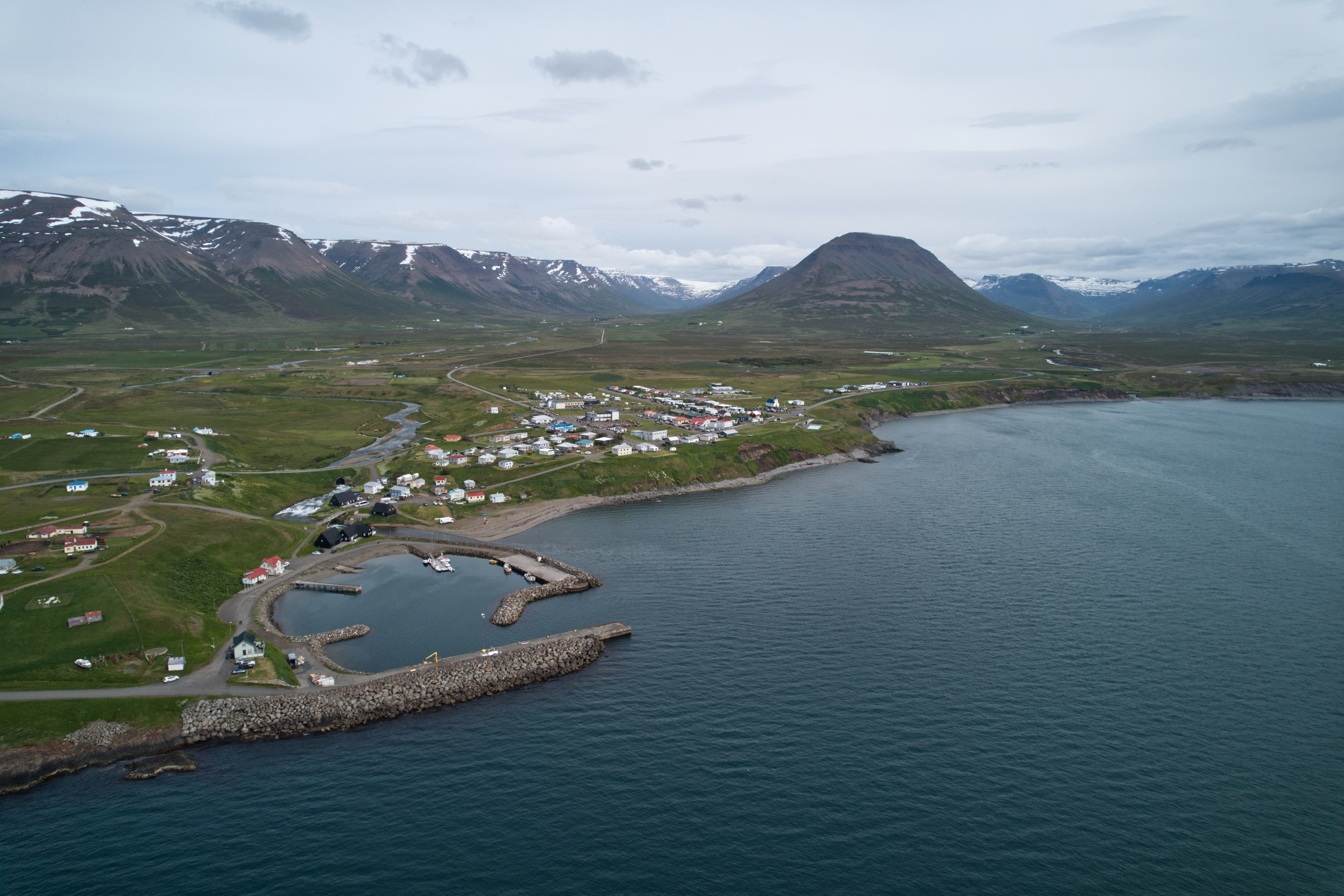

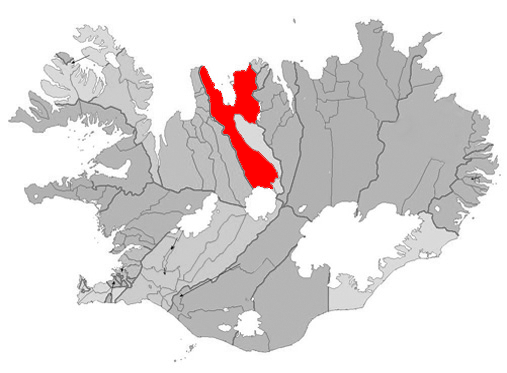
- Location of the Municipality of Skagafjörður

- Location within Iceland
- Coordinates: 65°54′N 19°26′W
- Country: Iceland
- Constituency: Northwest Constituency
- Region: Northwestern Region
- Municipality: Skagafjörður

Population (January 2011)
  - Total: 190

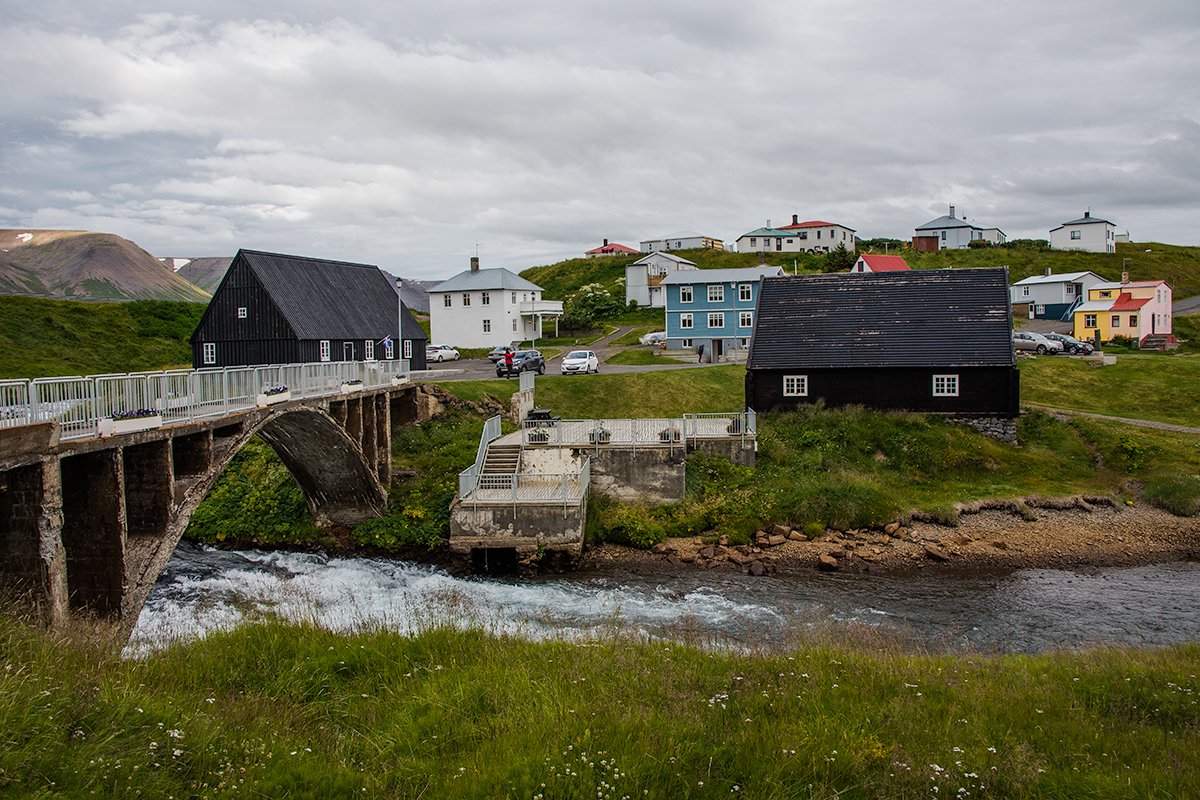
Hofsós is one of the oldest trading places in Iceland

Hofsós (Icelandic pronunciation: [ˈhɔfsˌouːs]) is one of the oldest trading ports in northern Iceland dating back to the 16th century. The tiny village Hofsós in the Northern Region in Iceland was a rather busy trading post in the 17th and 18th century, but despite the merchant activities this small village did not develop into a larger village or a town in the 20th century. Hofsós had all the historical prerequisites to become a large town. It was a trading post for the Danish Trade Monopoly, it was not far away from the fishing grounds, it was central in the region, and it had a relatively good landing spot for boats. The Drangey Exhibition is in Pakkhús, the Hofsós warehouse built in 1777, during the time of the trading monopoly. Massacre hill farm (Mannskaðaholl) at the south end of Lake Höfðavatn, is named for the massacre of English marauders, which took place there in 1431.

Other services offered are accommodation in guesthouses, a restaurant, coffee-house, and a camping site. There are also pleasant walks along the shore with good examples of hexagonal basalt columns. Thorðarhöfði headland rises like an island some distance from the main shore. It is connected to land by low sandpits impounding a considerable lake with rich bird life and good trout fishing.

== Overview ==
Hofsós, with a population of about 200 individuals, is located 37 km east from Sauðárkrókur. The economy has been based mainly on the fishing industry as well as services to the neighboring farms. This was largely due to its natural harbor. In recent years Hofsós has built itself up as a tourist attraction and has The Icelandic Emigration Center (Vesturfarasetrið á Hofsósi), dedicated to the westward migration to North America of Icelanders that reached its peak at the start of the 20th century.
