= Hofsá (disambiguation) =

Hofsá (Icelandic for "temple river") may refer to various rivers of the same name:

- Hofsá, located in Vopnafjörður in the Northeastern part of Iceland
- Hofsá (Skagafjörður), located in Höfðaströnd in Skagafjörður, Iceland
- Hofsá (Vesturdalur), located in Vesturdalur in Skagafjörður, Iceland
