= Önundur vís =

Ninth-century Icelandic settler

Önundur the Wise
- Önundur vís
- Era: Settlement of Iceland

Önundur vís (also víss), or Önundur the Wise, was an early Icelandic settler in Skagafjörður during the 9th and 10th centuries. First, he settled land in the eastern portion of Austurdalur (east valley). Then, according to the Landnámabók, he tried to claim the western part of the valley after becoming aware that Eiríkur Hróaldsson of Goðdalir intended to go and claim the that part of the valley for himself, Önundur rushed to shoot a flaming arrow across the Austari-Jökulsá river and claim the western side of Austurdalur with fire. The Landnámabók states that he lived "in the middle of the river" and Ábær is considered to have been a part of his homestead.
