= Hof í Vesturdal =

Former farm and church site in Skagafjörður, Iceland

Hof in Vesturdalur
- Farm (abandoned), church site
- Hof í Vesturdal
- Interactive map of Hof in Vesturdalur
- Country: Iceland
- County: Skagafjörður (municipality)
- Founder: Eiríkur Hróaldsson

Hof í Vesturdal (Hof in Vesturdalur valley) in Skagafjörður, Iceland, is now an abandoned farm but it was previously a ranch and church site. It was the homestead of Eiríkur Hróaldsson in Goðdalir as well as the ancestral home of the Goðdæla clan—Eríkur's descendants. New farms built on the land of Hof were inhabited; however, the main farm has been abandoned since 1999.

Hof's land holdings are incredibly vast, encompassing all the land between the Hofsá river in Vesturdalur and the Vestari-Jökulsá all the way south to Hofsjökull glacier, which is named for Hof. Furthermore, the estate included Hof's pasture land and was one of the largest properties in Iceland. Hof is about 20 kilometers from Hofsjökull and around 65 kilometers from the sea by Sauðárkrókur.

There is geothermal energy in Hof and the water from there is used to heat two towns.
