= Books in Spain =

In 2018, two firms in Spain ranked among the world's biggest publishers of books in terms of revenue: Grupo Planeta and Grupo Santillana. (Note: The same two also topped the list in 2016 in 2017.) In 2013, there were 524,213 titles in print in Spain, including 76,434 new titles.

== History ==
"The first Spanish press was set up in 1473 at Valencia, where the German trading company of Ravensburg had an important base.... Publishing flourished in the early period at Barcelona, Burgos, Zaragoza, Seville, and the university towns of Salamanca and Alcalá de Henares." The Instituto Nacional del Libro Español (National Book Institute) formed in 1941. As of 2004 Spain had some 2,000+ book publishers in the private sector, including Prensa Española, and Prisa. As of 2013 there were 809 publishing enterprises.

The United Nations Educational, Scientific and Cultural Organization designated Madrid the 2001 World Book Capital.

== Fairs ==
- Feria del Libro de Albacete
- Feria del libro y del disco vasco de Durango
- Feria del Libro de Madrid
- Feria de Otoño del Libro Viejo y Antiguo de Madrid
- Feria del Libro Antiguo y de Ocasión de Madrid
- Feria del libro de Valencia

== Collections ==
- Biblioteca Colombina, Seville
- Museo del Libro Fadrique de Basilea, in Burgos

== See also ==
- Collection (publishing)
- Copyright law of Spain
- Legal deposit: Spain
- Book publishing companies of Spain (es)
- Spanish literature
- Media of Spain
- Printing in Spain
  - Printing in Burgos
  - Printing in Segovia
  - Printing in Seville
  - Printing in Valencia
- Spanish children's books
- University College Dublin's Iberian Books project (est. 2007)

== Bibliography ==
in English

- G.W. Porter; G.K. Fortescue, eds. (1889). "Bibliographies of Countries: Spain". List of Bibliographical Works in the Reading Room of the British Museum (2nd ed.). London. OCLC 3816244 – via Internet Archive.
- Konrad Haebler (1897). Early Printers of Spain and Portugal. Illustrated Monographs. Chiswick Press for the Bibliographical Society.
- Robert Proctor (1898). "Books Printed From Types: Spain". Index to the Early Printed Books in the British Museum. London: Kegan Paul, Trench, Trübner and Company. pp. 698+. hdl:2027/uc1.c3450632. OCLC 6438080 – via HathiTrust.
- Henry Thomas (1920). "Output of Spanish Books in the Sixteenth Century". The Library. 1, 4th series (2). Oxford University Press, for the Bibliographical Society. ISSN 0024-2160.
- Laurence Witten (1959). "Earliest Books Printed in Spain". Papers of the Bibliographical Society of America. 53 (2): 91–113. doi:10.1086/pbsa.53.2.24299724. JSTOR 24299724. S2CID 163403969.
- Frederick John Norton [in German] (1966). Printing in Spain 1501-1520. Cambridge University Press. ISBN 9780521131186. OCLC 58905805.
- Harry Braverman; et al. (10 July 1969), "Publishing in Spain", New York Review of Books, 13 (1)
- V. F. Goldsmith, A Short Title Catalogue of Spanish and Portuguese Books 1601-1700 in the Library of the British Museum. 1974
- D. W. Cruickshank (1976). "Some Aspects of Spanish Book-Production in the Golden Age". The Library. 31, 5th series. ISSN 0024-2160.
- Dennis E. Rhodes (1976), "More light on sixteenth-century printing at Salamanca", British Library Journal, UK, ISSN 1478-0259
- D. W. Cruickshank (1978). "'Literature' and the Book Trade in Golden-Age Spain". Modern Language Review. 73 (4): 799–824. doi:10.2307/3727595. JSTOR 3727595.
- Allen Kent; et al., eds. (1978). "Printers and Printing". Encyclopedia of Library and Information Science. Vol. 23. Marcel Dekker. ISBN 978-0-8247-2023-0.
  - Printing in Spain and Portugal before 1501, p. 359?+
  - 16th Century: Spain and Portugal, p. 412+
  - 17th Century: Spain, p. 441+
  - 18th Century: Spain and Portugal, p. 471+
- Theodore S. Beardsley Jr. (1979). "Spanish Printers and the Classics: 1482-1599". Hispanic Review. 47 (1): 25–35. doi:10.2307/472922. JSTOR 472922.
- Keith Whinnom [in Spanish] (1980). "Problem of the 'Best-Seller' in Spanish Golden-Age Literature". Bulletin of Hispanic Studies.
- Catherine Swietlicki (1993). "Printing in Spain". In Germán Bleiberg [in Spanish]; et al. (eds.). Dictionary of the Literature of the Iberian Peninsula. Greenwood Press. p. 1316+. ISBN 978-0-313-28732-9.
- "Spain: Directory: Publishers". Europa World Year Book 2004. Europa Publications. 2004. p. 3909+. ISBN 1857432533.
- Rosario de Mateo; et al. (2004). "Spain: Book Publishing". In Euromedia Research Group; Mary Kelly (eds.). Media in Europe (3rd ed.). SAGE Publications. p. 228. ISBN 978-0-7619-4132-3.
- Alexander Samuel Wilkinson (ed.). Iberian Books. Brill. OCLC 948629100. 2010-
- Maria Luisa López-Vidriero (2013). "Iberian Peninsula". In Michael F. Suarez; H. R. Woudhuysen (eds.). The Book: A Global History. Oxford University Press. pp. 406–419. ISBN 978-0-19-967941-6.
- Benito Rial Costas, ed. (2013). Print Culture and Peripheries in Early Modern Europe: A Contribution to the History of Printing and the Book Trade in Small European and Spanish Cities. Brill. ISBN 9789004235748.
- Antonio Cordón-García José; et al. (2014). "E-Book publishing in Spain: The paradoxes of a dual model". Electronic Library. 32. doi:10.1108/EL-12-2012-0155. hdl:10366/129764. ISSN 0264-0473.
- Alexander S. Wilkinson; Alejandra Ulla Lorenzo, eds. (2017). A Maturing Market: The Iberian Book World in the First Half of the Seventeenth Century. Brill. ISBN 9789004340374.

in Spanish

- Francisco Méndez [in Spanish] (1861). Dionisio Hidalgo [in Spanish] (ed.). Tipografia española, ó Historia de la introduccion, propagacion y progresos del arte de la imprenta en España [Spanish typography, or history of the introduction, propagation and progress of the art of printing in Spain] (in Spanish). Madrid.
- Cristóbal Pérez Pastor (1891–1907). Bibliografia madrilena del siglo XVI (in Spanish).
- Konrad Haebler (1903). Bibliografía Ibérica del Siglo XV: enumeración de todos los libros impresos en España y Portugal hasta el año de 1500 [Iberian Bibliography of the 15th Century: list of all printed books in Spain and Portugal until the year 1500] (in Spanish). Nijhoff.
- Bibliografía general española e hispano-americana (in Spanish), 1923–1942, OCLC 1112967
- El libro espanol (in Spanish), Madrid: Instituto Nacional del Libro Español, OCLC 243469877 1958-
- Fernando Cendán Pazos (1974). Historia del derecho español de prensa e imprenta (1502-1966) [History of the Spanish press and publications law] (in Spanish). Madrid. ISBN 8427611862.

in other languages

- Raimundo Diosdado Caballero (1793). De prima typographiae hispanicae aetate specimen (in Latin). Rome: Antonium Fulgonium.
