= Merkigil =

Abandoned farm in Skagafjörður, Iceland

- Abandoned farm
- Interactive map of Merkigil
- Country: Iceland
- County: Skagafjörður (municipality)
- Abandoned after the death of Helgi Jónsson: 1997
- Named for: Merkigil gorge

Merkigil is an abandoned farm in Austurdalur valley in Skagafjörður, Iceland and was the northernmost farm in the eastern valley. The land was considered good for farming and it is surrounded by deep and imposing gorges as well as tall mountains. Supplying the area is extremely challenging.

== Geography ==
The Austari-Jökulsá gorge is west of Merkigil gorge, and to the north of the farm of the same name, which split Kjálki and Austurdalur. People generally crossed the gorge to access the town, heading either to Kjálki or Blönduhlíð. There was only a narrow footpath for navigating the edge of the cliff, so it was not possible to transport goods to the market in Skagafjörður, but there were cargo paths over Nýjabæjarfjall into Eyjafjörður and on to Akureyri.

== History ==
Many people ran successful farms in Merkigil in centuries past, but the most well-known farmer there was the widow Monika Helgadóttir who first lived there with her husband Jóhannes starting in 1926. When he died in 1947, leaving her with eight small children—the youngest of which was only a few weeks old—Monika resumed tending to the farm and built a concrete residence there in 1949. The house had everything needed to get across Merkigil by horse. Monika became known throughout the country when Guðmundur G. Hagalín wrote about her in the book Konan í dalnum og dæturnar sjö (The Woman in the Valley and Her Seven Daughters) in 1954.

Monika fought for a long time to have a bridge to Austari-Jökulsá over Merkigil and she ultimately succeeded. The bridge is often called Monikubrú (Monica's Bridge).

In 1972, when all of Monika's children had moved away from home and she was alone, she made an agreement with Helgi Jónsson that he would inherit the land if he helped her with the farming. She died in 1988 and Helgi became the last farmer in Merkigil until he fell to his death in the gorge in 1997. For years, he had been the last parishioner in the Ábær parish.
