= Ábær =

Abandoned farm and church site in Skagafjörður, Iceland

- Village
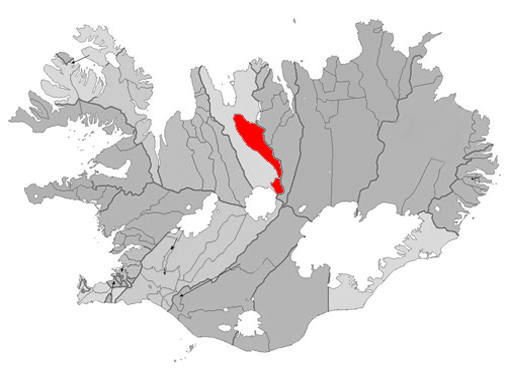
- Location of the Municipality of Akrahreppur

- Location of Ábær in Iceland
- Coordinates: 65°18′N 18°52′W
- Country: Iceland
- Constituency: Northwest Constituency
- Region: Northwestern Region
- Municipality: Skagafjörður
- Time zone: UTC+0 (GMT)

Ábær (Icelandic pronunciation: [ˈauːˌpaiːr̥]) (from Áabær "farm of rivers") is an abandoned farm and church site in Austurdalur, on the eastern bank of the Austari-Jökulsá in Skagafjörður, Iceland. There is a small, concrete church that still stands in Ábær, although it was not consecrated until 1922. The farm itself became abandoned in 1941. The Ábær parish was served by Goðdalir for a time and, in 1907, it was transferred to Mælifell. Önundur the wise, who settled the land in Austurdalur valley, lived in Ábær, according to the Landnámabók.

== History ==
The restaurant Ábær (now N1 Ábær) in Sauðárkrókur derives its name from the farm, and Gunnar Bragi Sveinsson, member of parliament and former foreign minister, managed it, among other things, before beginning his work in parliament.

There are many places named Árbær in Iceland but the name Ábær is unique in the country, and the topic was discussed in a widely known essay by Margeir Jónson called Torskilin bæjanöfn í Skagafjarðarsýslu ("Obscure place names in Skagafjörður County"). He explains that the farm is not only situated on one river, but two, Austari-Jökulsá and its tributaries by the farm, which form Ábæjardalur valley before reaching the farm and continuing slightly farther out of the ravine. Thus, the town was named "the farm between rivers," which in Old Norse was Bær millum á (compared to modern Icelandic: Bær milli áa). Shortly after 1100, there was some haziness surrounding the name, but it was resolved and the farm was given this name.

== Ábær church ==
The church in Ábær was built in 1922, not long before the farm was abandoned. The church, which was designed by the State Architect of Iceland, Guðjón Samúelsson, is small and made of concrete. Its materials came from Skagafjörður, but the wood used for the church, which was previously built in Ábær in 1842, was moved from Akureyri to Leyningsdalur valley in Eyjafjörður, and people hauled it over Nýjabæjarfjall mountain on sleds. It is hard to go over the mountain with cargo because of how steep it is (however there was a frequently traveled horse path), so this was considered a feat.

The church was previously served by Goðdalir, but it was transferred to Mælifell in 1907. The church there always holds one mass per year, on the Sunday of Verslunarmannahelgin ("Merchant’s Weekend," a holiday and festival weekend in August). Often, more than 100 people attend the service and there is coffee served afterwards at Merkigil, which was abandoned in 1997. Merkigil is also where Helgi Jónsson fatally crashed into the ravine. He had been the only parishioner in Ábær for many years. Helgi’s siblings donated a baptismal font to the church in his memory. It was built from birch wood that grew in the Austari-Jökulsá river ravine.

== Ábær ghost ==
The Ábær ghost is a female ghost in Icelandic folklore that is named after the farm. She has played tricks on many people, mainly in inner Skagafjörður, including killing livestock, and frightening people. She is said to have caused multiple deaths.
