= Monika Helgadóttir =

Icelandic farmer (1901–1988)

- Born: November 25, 1901; Árnastaðir farm in Lýtingsstaðahreppur, Skagafjörður, Iceland
- Died: October 6, 1988 (aged 86)
- Other name: Monika á Merkigili (Monika of Merkigil)

Monika Helgadóttir, also known as Monika of Merkigil (Monika á Merkigili) was an Icelandic farmer who was born on November 25, 1901, in Skagafjörður, Iceland. She was a farmer in Merkigil, and was the driving force behind getting a bridge built in the Merkigil gorge. Her life is the subject of the 1954 book Konan í dalnum og dæturnar sjö (The Woman in the Valley and Her Seven Daughters) by Guðmundur G. Hagalín. Monika died in 1988.

== Early life ==
Monika was born on the Árnastaðir farm in Lýtingsstaðahreppur, a rural municipality of Skagafjörður, to Helgi Björnsson and Margrét Sigurðardóttir. She was the seventh of ten children and was known for her strong work ethic. At age 11, she began spending her summers working away from home cutting and baling grass on nearby farms.

When she was a young woman, Monika traveled to Reykjavík to work in a fish factory where her uncle was a foreman. In the summer of 1924, she returned to Skagafjörður to visit her family and took on odd jobs. Although she intended to return to Reykjavík, her boat was delayed and, while she was waiting to leave, she was offered a job taking care of and elderly couple and their farm. She took the job and moved to the farm in Merkigil, where she cared for Sigurbjörg, a 93-year-old woman. In 1926, Monika married Sigurbjörg's son Jóhannes Bjarnarson. They had eight children together: seven daughters and one son. When Jóhannes died at age 47, their youngest child was just 16 days old.

== Accomplishments ==
The farm in Merkigil is surrounded by steep gorges that make travel difficult, and bringing supplies into the valley was especially challenging. Monika designed and, in 1949, began building a concrete house to replace the old turf farmhouse. Her daughters transported all the materials for the house, including a new bathtub and kitchen stove, into the valley by horse. Her daughters were particularly invested in finding a way to bring in a cement mixer with the building materials because they knew that they would otherwise have to mix the cement themselves by hand. Monika finished building the house in 1950. She later sold the property in 1972 after her children had grown up and moved away. She was the last farmer in Merkigil. The property has since been abandoned.

Monika spent many years lobbying for a bridge to be built across the Austari-Jökulsá river in the Merkigil gorge. The bridge was eventually built in 1961 and it is often referred to as Monikubrú (Monika's bridge).

Monika's life was the subject of the book Konan í dalnum og dæturnar sjö (The Woman in the Valley and Her Seven Daughters), by Guðmundur G. Hagalín, published in 1954.

The Skagafjörður Heritage Museum (Byggðasafn Skagfirðinga) has an exhibition featuring a number of Monika's items in the Áshús loft. Monika was an excellent sewer and her embroidery of Ólaf liljurós is part of the exhibition, which "highlights the domestic environment and household items typical of Icelandic farms in the mid-20th century".

== Awards ==
In 1953, Monika was awarded the Knight's Cross of the Order of the Falcon.
