= List of women music publishers before 1900 =

Women music publishers have existed since the late 16th century, but were comparatively rare before the 20th century. Most of these names were extracted from searching WorldCat using prefixes such as "Veuve" or "Witwe" and their variants (both meaning widow in French and German respectively). The years active were determined from the holdings in Worldcat or as indicated in the footnotes. Since Worldcat should not be taken to represent all published works, most of the dates should be considered approximations primarily based on the evidence available.

== Women music publishers before 1900 ==
Sorting surname	Imprint	Birth name or known name	Birth/Death dates	Husband	Approx. years active	Location	Sample OCLC or other number	Remarks
Adams	Elizabeth Adams	Elizabeth Adams	-	Thomas Adams (died 1620)	1620—ca. 1630	London		
Allouel	Veuve Allouel	Marguerite Madeline Prault	born after 1712—died after 1747	Jean-Louis Allouel (died 26 December 1737)	1738–1743 or 1747	Paris	18045712	married 3 May 1737
Anderson	? Anderson			James Johnson (ca. 1750—26 February 1811)	1811–1815	Edinburgh	181768673	
Artaria	Math. Artarias's Witwe	Karoline Gsangler	* 1798	Mathias Artaria (1793—22 April 1835)	1835–1847	Vienna	48709235	she was the widow of Ludwig Maisch (see below); married Artaria on 4 November 1821
Ayscough	Anne Ayscough			William Ayscough (died 1719)	1720–1730	Nottingham	508320492	
Bailey	Lydia Bailey (printer)	Lydia Steele	1 February 1779 – 21 February 1869	Robert Bailey (died 1808)	1808–1861	Philadelphia	11534652	
Baldwin	Printed for A. Baldwin	Anne Baldwin		Richard Baldwin (died 1698)	1698–1725?	London		
Ballard	Veuve Ballard, & Son fils	Lucrèce Dugué	1544?–1598	Robert Ballard (1530–1588)	1588–1598	Paris	41001974	
Barbat	Veuve Barbat					Paris	944271155	
Barbin	Veuve de Claude Barbin	Marie Cochart	approximately 1643—3 December 1707	Claude Barbin (died December 1698)	1698–1707	Paris	1061995451	married 22 February 1669
Beaux	Vve. Beaux					Paris	843221929	
Benavides	ex officina herederos de Paula de Benavides, viuda de Bernardo Calderón	Paula de Benavides		Bernardo Calderón	1656–1700	Mexico City	Iberian Books: C90146	No extant copy of cited music edition
Benoist	Mme. Benoist				1811–1821	Paris	44826530	
Benoît	Veuve Emile Benoît				1897	Paris	842178259	
Bergen	Melchior Bergens Witwe			Melchior Bergen		Dresden	962407950	
Berger-Levrault	Veuve Berger-Levrault					Strasbourg	842228201	
Beroud	Vve. Beroud				1840–1850?	Geneva	1041326734	
Blanc	Veuve Blanc				1868–1877	Paris	763050740	Sold business to J. Iochem in 1877
Bodin	Vve. Bodin				1867	Paris	844069755	
Bohem	Vve. Bohem				1836	Lille	64344961	
Boivin	Veuve Boivin	Elisabeth Catherine Ballard	died 13 February 1776	François Boivin (1693-1733)	1733-1753	Paris		Daughter of publisher Jean-Baptiste-Christophe Ballard; sold firm to Marc Bayard in 1753
Bondeli	Veuve Bondeli				1756–1757	Lausanne	717585641	
Boom	Weduwe van Dirck Boom			Dirck Boom	1690–1702	Amsterdam	498624375	
Bornet	Veuve Bornet			Louis Bournet (died 1798)	1789–1795	Paris	498419873	
Bouchard	Veuve Bouchard				1848–1863	Paris	1027775975	
Bouchot	Vve. Bouchot				1869	Paris	842223903	
Boüin	Veuve Boüin			Boüin (died 1798)	1798	Paris	1061612308	
Brandt	Veuve Brandt				1817	Le Locle	1040146220	
Braun	Veuve Braun				1864–1866	Paris	965378268	
Brome	Joanna Brome			Henry Brome (died 1681)	1681–1684	London	965378268	succeeded by her son, Charles Brome
Bureau	Veuve Philippe Bureau				1678	Niort	14919012	
Burx	Wittwe Burx				1815	Darmstadt	498216836	
Camusat	Veuve Camusat				1649	Paris	JMG 17-189	
Canaux	Veuve Canaux	Flore-Félicité Poiré	27 November 1809—3 June 1851	Charles-François-Toussaint Canaux (30 January 1801—12 November 1842)	1842–1882	Paris	658856515	
Celard	Veuve C. Celard				1893	Paris?	1078354579	
Chabal	Veuve Chabal	Louise-Hyacinth Berthé		Jean-Louis Chabal	1877–1900	Paris	659184268	married Chabal on 5 July 1842
Charles	Veuve Charles				1898	Paris	1018389924	
Chatot	Veuve Chatot				1890	Paris	46665015	
Chavrondier	Vve. Chavrondier et fils				1890–1891	Paris	842137098	
Chiarini	Veuve Chiarini				1855–1862	Paris	763059235	
Clauzier	Vve. Clauzier				1709	Paris	658683404	
Cluppel	Weduwe van Albert Cluppel			Albert Cluppel	1655	Enkhuizen	498307023	
Cnobbart	Weduwe ende Erfghenamen van Jan Cnobbart			Jan Cnobbart	1645	Antwerp	498382558	
Cogniet	Veuve Cogniet	Marie Senez		Victor Cogniet (died 1889)	1895–1910	Paris	971615522	
Colombier	Veuve Colombier	Olympe Masset	died 6 April 1892	François-Jules Colombier (August 1809-19 January 1884)	1884–1892	Paris	659206072	Daughter of the publisher Eugène-Théodore Troupenas (1799–1850)
Conrard	Vve. Conrard			Léon Conrard	1888	Paris	658796040	Married 11 March 1876 to the widow (Veuve) Caisel
Corbaz	Veuve L. Corbaz				1843–1852	Paris	715140685	
Courleux	Veuve G. Courleux				1895–1897	Paris	951174847	
Curmer	Vve. A. Curmer			Alphonse Curmer	1865–1867	Paris	1078378626	
Daullé	Veuve Daullé				1765–1768	Paris	658583270	
Decombe	Veuve Decombe	Marie-Anne Bal(l)iat)		Jacques-François Decombe (died 20 May 1806); married 1791	1806–1819	Paris	498765364	
Delarue	Vve. Delarue				1869	Bayeux	1085383200	
Delcros	Veuve Delcros				1739	Clermont-Ferrand	16883685	
Delormel	Veuve Delormel			Pierre Delormel	1751–1756	Paris	825554169	worked in association with her son Pierre-Nicolas Delormel
De Schippers	Veuve De Schippers				1677–1692	Amsterdam	498641958	
Dieth	Veuve de L[éonard] Dieth				1771	St. Gall	716150334	
Dinquel	Veuve Dinquel				1856-1865	Paris	887564622	
Dondey-Dupré	Veuve Dondey-Dupré				1844	Paris	435935343	
Dorval	Mme. C. Dorval				1821	Paris	57438711	
Dubos	Veuve Dubos et fils				1890	Paris	944274516	
Duchêne	Vve. Duchêne				1879	Paris	948672603	
Duchesne	Veuve Duchesne			Nicolas-Bonaventure Duchesne (died 4 July 1765)	1765–1788	Paris	28176569	
Dufaut	Veuve Dufaut				1830	Paris	68067357	
Duhan	Mme. Duhan	Jeanne-Elisabeth Duhan	1760—22 November 1823		1802—1823	Paris	51958931	
Dumesnil	Veuve Laurent Dumesnil				1789	Paris	498817920	
Dumont	Veuve Dumont				1882		1030607104	
Erard	Melles. Erard or Mlles. Erard	Marie-Françoise Marcoux and Catherine-Barbe Marcoux	1777–1851 ca 1779–1815		ca. 1798–1830?	Paris	842371550	Catherine-Barbe married Delahante
Farrenc	Vve. L. Farrenc (Louise Farrenc)	Jeanne-Louise Dumont	31 May 1804—Paris, 15 September 1875	Aristide Farrenc	1865-1872	Paris	844202912	
Fatout	Veuve Fatout				1893-1901	Paris	816729905	formed a partnership with Léon Girard; after Girard's death (17 March 1920), she appears as "Jenne Veuve Girard (née Fatout)"
Felginer	Felginers Wittwe	Catharina Sophia Felginer		Theodor Christoph Felginer (1686–1726)	1742–1742	Hamburg	62261185	
Fevrot	Veuve Fevrot				1850	Lyon	944277771	
Foucault	Veuve Foucault			Henri Foucault (died 19 October 1719)	1720	Paris	JMF 13-17	in 1722 she married Dallemont, a furrier, and sold her business to François Boivin
Fournier	Veuve Fournier				1886–1887	Paris	842099595	
Freund	G. Freund's Witwe				1868	Prague	497108703	
Gaultier	Veuve Gaultier (Richer)				1672–1673	Paris	30403961	
Garaudé	Vve. [Alexis] de Garaudé	Jeanne-Julie Digout		Alexis-Adélaïde-Gabriel de Garaudé (21 March 1779—30 March 1852)	1853–1888	Paris	854747132	married 4 April 1840
Galante	Veuve Galante				1739–1760	Brussels	1066861400	
García Infançón	Viuda de Juan Garcia Infançon			Juan García Infançón (1676–1707)	1714	Madrid	435943220	
Gaude	Veuve Gaude				1843	Nismes	367473134	
Gauvin	Veuve Gauvin				1887–1894	Paris	658873607	
Genton	Veuve S. Genton				1878–1882	Lausanne	715916903	
Gerlach	Catharinæ Gerlachiæ	Katharina Bischoff, Katharina Schmidin, Katharina Gerlachin	ca. 1520–1592	Nicolas Schmid, Johann vom Berg, Dietrich Gerlach	1564-1592	Nuremberg	751649631	
Gheluve	Veuve Ghéluve	Clémentine Blocquet	1835–1923	Edmond Van Gheluve	1880–1895	Paris	1027768019	
Girod	Veuve E. Girod	Antoinette-Louise Manera	11 November 1838 – 8 March 1906	Etienne Girod (1824?—11 January 1865)	1881–1907	Paris	658941871	
Goulden	Veuve Goulden				1797-1798	Paris	658588006	no further information other than working with Frédéric-Daniel Vogt
Groot	Weduwe van Gysbert de Groot/Veuve G. de Groot			Gysbert de Groot	1705–1716	Amsterdam	498642632	
Hagenaar	Veuve L. Hagenaar				1840	Amsterdam	67012291	
Händel	Peter Händel (Witwe)				1648	Königsberg	856871958	
Hardy	Veuve Hardy				1896–1897	Paris	659145425	
Haslinger	Veuve Haslinger	Caroline Haslinger	5 April 1789 – 24 March 1848	Tobias Haslinger (1787-1842)	1842–1848	Vienna		
Hayard	Vve. Léon Hayard				1903–1907?	Paris	930792229	
Héraud	Veuve Héraud				1888-1889	Paris	659201143	
Herissant	Veuve Herissant				1775–1790	Paris	1016208526	
Heuzé	Veuve Heuzé				1836	Rennes	843724957	
Hirand	Vve. Hirand				1889	Paris	844188339	
Hoffmann	C.L. Hoffmanns sel. Wittwe und Erben			Carl Ludolph Hoffmann (1729–1780)	1784–1786	Weimar	74893716	
Hoffmann	Joh. Hoffmanns's Witwe				1881	Prague	703149634	
Hummel	Veuve de B: Hummel				1797–1800	The Hague	1061644578	
Hüter	Johann Hüters Witwe			Johann Hüter (1605–1677)	1677–1682	Mülhausen	842463770	
Iochem	Veuve Jules Iochem	Aglaé-Célestine Bourcier	died 30 January 1890	Jules-Jean-Mathieu (10 August 1843—22 April 1889)	1889-1890	Paris	948673243	married in 1877
Jacob	Veuve J. Jacob				1700-1799	Liège	23626456	
Jacobsz	Th. Jacobsz Witwe			Theunis Jacobsz	1666—1680	Amsterdam	311492551	
Jolly	Veuve J. F. Jolly				1760	Amsterdam	1061664455	
Joly	Veuve Joly				1823	Paris	419986788	
Johnson	Veuve Johnson et Fils				1740	Rotterdam	1069341201	
Köhler	Henning Kölers Sel. Witbe			Henning Köhler (1599–1656)	1656–1668	Leipzig		
Konynenbergh	Konynenbergh Witwe				1620	Amsterdam	311492306	
Laborda	viuda de A. Laborda				1639	Valencia	Iberian Books: B82180	
Laet	Veuve de Jean Laet				1569	Antwerp	78354663	
Lamaignère	Veuve Lamaignère				1870	Bayonne	68235451	
Landry	Veuve Landry				1702	Paris		
Larouse	Vve. P. Larousse				1885–1889	Paris	844294112	
Launer	Veuve Launer	Marie-Pierre Boissiere	23 May 1787 — 21 May 1863	Jean-Louis-Marie Launer (1785-5 October 1839)	1839–1853	Paris	24074309	married 27 August 1825
Laurent	Veuve Laurent				1740	Berlin	498643155	
Lauster	Vve. Lauster				1848	Paris	842225591	
Lavinée	Veuve Lavinée			Auguste-Jean-Bapsite Lavinée (1805?—3 April 1878)	1878–1883	Paris	762582077	
Leclair	Vve. Leclair				1766	Paris	658646999	
Leduc	Veuve Leduc	Augustine-Julie Bernier	died 16 July 1831	Antoine-Pierre-Auguste (1779—25 May 1823)	1828–1837	Paris	68582431	his 2nd wife; after her death the firm kept operating under her imprint until July 1837
Lemenu (Le Menu)	Veuve Lemenu (Le Menu)	Roze Croisoeuil du Courty		Christophe Le Menu de Saint-Philbert (died 16 September 1774)	1775—1790	Paris	173513257	married 26 June 1752; sold store to Charles-George Boyer on 21 January 1779
Lemoine aîné	Vve. Lemoine aîné	Constance Berger	died 8 September 1849	François Lemoine (Lemoine ainé) (1782—24 May 1839)	1839–1849	Paris	869897782	married 3 April 1839
Levrault	Wittwe Levrault				1842–1868	Strasbourg	844027103	
Lillie	Ludolph Henrich Lillies Wittwe				1765	Copenhagen	485726239	
Loddé	Vve. Lucien Loddé				1890	Orléans	1027766292	
Lorenz	Johann Lorentz nachgelassenen Wittwe			Johann Lorenz (died 1733)	1736	Berlin	498646589	
Lottin	Veuve de Ph. N. Lottin				1752	Paris	740934545	
Lucca	F. Lucca	Giovannina Strazza	1810—19 August 1894	Francesco Lucca (21 December—20 February 1872)	1832—1888	Milan		married Lucca in 1832 and began working with him; sold business to Ricordi in 1888
Magnier	Veuve Magnier				1856-1872	Paris	1043701712	
Maisch	Ludwig Maisch	Anna Maria Carolina [given name unidentified]		Ludwig Maisch (ca. 1776- 18 April 1816)	1810-1822	Vienna		Married 2 May 1800; After Maisch's death, his widow kept running the firm under his name until she married Mathias Artaria
Marais	Veuve Marais				1729	Paris	1065396500	
Margueritat	Veuve Margueritat				1867–1880	Paris	867601931	
Markordt	Veuve Markordt				1785–1800?	Amsterdam	638618795	
Marquerie	Veuve Ch. Marquerie	Mme. Bernardo		Charles-Marie Marquerie (9 October 1817 – 30 November 1853)	1859–1867	Paris	780289683	
Masson	Mme. Masson (Veuve Huet)	Anne-Geneviève Masson			1801–1814	Paris	55908048	
Mechel	Johann Conrad von Mechel sel. Wittwe				1741	Basel	32919270	
Mechetti	Pietro Mechetti Veuve	Theresia Mechetti	baptized 13 February 1788, died 28 June 1855		1850–1855	Vienna	1002885776	
Mechel	Veuve de Jean Conrad de Mechel				1759	Basel	498227456	
Meïs	Vve. Meïs			F. Meis	1881	Paris	842136987	
Mercier	Veuve [Pierre-Gilles] Le Mercier				1781	Paris	1040961171	
Mesen	Weduwe Jacob Mesens			Jacob Mesen	1628	Amsteredam	498451125	
Metzner	Vve. Metzner				1888	Nancy	843049072	
Meyer	J.H. Meyers Wittwe				1757	Lemgo	24829291	
Morel	Vve. Morel				1709	Paris	658662297	
Morhart	Ulrich Morharts Wittib	Magdalena Kirschmann	ca. 1505	Ulrich Morhart (ca. 1490–1554)	1555–1572	Tübingen	165684149	
Morisot	Veuve Morisot				1870	Sens	763059777	
Moucelot	Veuve Moucelot				1872–1873	Paris	1018392529	
Mouret	Veuve Mouret				1732–1744	Paris	21824937	
Mourette	Veuve Md. Mourette				1727–1738	Paris	21824956	
Müller	H.F. Müller Veuve	Dorothea Müller	ca. 1784 – 9 April 1858		1848–1858	Vienna	23165568	
Muraille	Veuve Léopold Muraille				1862–1903?	Liège	JMF 89-887	
Naderman	Veuve de Jean-Henri Naderman	Barbe-Rose Courtois	1755—7 January 1839	Jean-Henri Naderman (1735—4 February 1799)	1799–1825	Paris	421722562	
Nicolo	Veuve Nicolo				1816?–1825	Paris	13295209	sold firm to E. Troupenas
Nolting	Veuve W. C. Nolting et fils				1795–1817	Amsterdam	931915337	
Olivier de Varennes	Veuve d'Olivier de Varennes				1679	Charenton	498641839	
Orga	viuda de Joseph de Orga			Joseph de Orga (1738–1809)	1765	Valencia	803589716	
Ott		Elsbeth Ott	died ca. 1557	Hans Ott (died 1546)	1546–1554	Nuremberg		
Paté	Veuve Paté	Constance Laurent	before 1884	Edme-Nicolas Paté (1800?—2 January 1862)	1859–1870	Paris	936576867	married 21 May 1836
Pichler	A. Pichlers Witwe	Elisabeth Pichler	27 April 1783 – 22 October 1865		1871–1923	Vienna	27351245	
Piermarini	Vve. Piermarini				1876	Paris	842304124	
Plantin	Veuve Plantin				1591	Antwerp	67794880	
Porchet	Vve. E. Porchet			Émile-David Porchet (died 1888?)	1886–1898	Paris	1059289189	
Poussielgue	Vve. Poussielgue			Antoine-Jean-Baptiste-Joseph Poussielgue (died 17 August 1849)	1849–1866	Paris	839250668	ceded operation to her sons in 1866, "Poussielgue Frères" who kept her imprint
Prêtre	Veuve Prêtre				1870–1872	Paris	920036370	
Ramírez	Ramírez, María				1598-1600	Alcalá de Henares	Iberian Books: 54401	
Ravayre-Raver	Vve. Ravayre-Raver			Louis Ravayre (14 June 1794—17 January 1849)	1872	Bordeaux	844196642	
Ravesteyn	Veuve de Paul de Ravesteyn			Paul van Ravesteyn	1657—1659	Amsterdam	716670553	
Régnier	Vve. Régnier	Clara Marquerite Canaux	29 August 1892—after 1864	Jean-Rémi Régnier (1822-19 April 1864)	1864-1869	Paris	842179058	
Remondet-Aubin	Veuve Remondet-Aubin				1837–1874	Aix-en-Provence	908129429	Printed and published Le Mémorial d'Aix
Rheten	Georg Rheten Wittwe				1655	Gdańsk	653113993	
Ribou	Veuve Ribou			Pierre Ribou	1719–1730	Paris	43094865	
Richault	Vve. Richault Mère	Marie-Madeleine-Louise Bastide (also known as Mme. Armand)	30 October 1813—after 1898	Guillaume-Simon Richault (Richault fils) (2 November 1805—7 February 1877)	1895–1897	Paris	658710808	married 24 August 1867
Riedl	Franz Riedl's seel. Wittwe & Sohn	Anna Riedl		Franz Riedl (ca. 1782 – 23 April 1836)	1837–1851	Vienna	1061784396	
Riegel	Veuve de Christoffle Riegel				1752	Nuremberg	65859524	
Rodríguez Lupercio	apud herederos de la viuda de Francisco Rodríguez Lupercio			Francisco Rodríguez Lupercio	1657–1700	Mexico City	Iberian Books: C88913	
Roger	Veuve Roger				1873	Paris	1034782271	
Rolle	"Auf Kosten der Wittwe des Autors"			Johann Heinrich Rolle (1716–1785)	1787	Leipzig	870946320	Only published works by her husband
Rotier	Veuve Rotier				1884	Paris	844200671	
Rouzeau-Montaut	Veuve Rouzeau-Montaut				1775	Orléans	57199414	
Royol	Vve. Royol			Isidore Royol	1856–1872?	Paris	718312361	
Salfeld	Sel. David Salfelds Wittwe				1688–1690	Berlin	1061675363	
Saudinos-Ritouret	Veuve D. Saudinos-Ritouret				1877–1878	Paris	1030601359	
Schiller	Benjamin Schillers Wittwe				1714–1715	Hamburg	497426276	
Schmid	Veuve du feu Balthasar Schmid	Maria Helena Volland	1710–1791	Balthasar Schmid (1705–1749)	1752–1775	Nuremberg	497311897	
Schützen	J. J. Schützens Wittwe			Johann Jacob Schützen	1755–1760	Berlin	909111850	
Sifflet	Veuve Sifflet				1771	Paris	718271849	
Simon	Veuve Simon & fils				1770–1777	Paris	497812218	
Simon	Veuve Simon				1852–1860	Paris	658499512	
Sitzmann	Wittwe Sitzmann				1771–1776	Kleve	58801694	
Someren	Weduwe van Johannes van Someren			Johannes van Someren	1680–1685	Amsterdam	312846643	
Soubre	Vve. Et. Soubre				?	Liège	66885546	
Sprenger	D. Sprenger	Caroline/Karoline Gsangler	* 1798	(Johann) Daniel Sprenger (ca. 1794—21 September 1819)	1819–1821	Vienna		married Mathias Artaria (see above) after the death of Sprenger
St. Hilaire	Vve. St Hilaire				1860–1867	Paris	842214719	
St-Marc	Vve. St-Marc				1797	Rennes	658683505	
Stämpfli	Veuve Stämpfli				1820	Bern	78332313	
Strauss	Anton Strauss's Witwe	Magdalena Strauß	1764–8 March 1845	Anton Strauß (1775–1827)	1828–1836	Vienna	497725899	
Struck	J. Strucks Wittwe				1832	Stralsund	936381495	
Sulzer	Veuve Sulzer				1867–1869	Paris	658811240	
Tarbé	Veuve Tarbé			Pierre-Hardouin Tarbé	1791	Sens	494980453	
Thiébaux	Veuve Thiébaux				1889	Paris	658460513	
Tixador	Vve. Tixador				1897	Perpignan	843196342	
Varennes	Veuve Ollivier de Varennes				1677	Charenton	716158783	
Weidner	Johann Weidners Witwe	Barbara Dreßler		Johann Weidner (1572–1625)	1626	Jena	30403635	
Winter	G. L. Winters Wittwe			Georg Ludwig Winter (–1772)	ca. 1772–1787	Berlin	497668552	
Wouw	Weduwe ende Erfgenamen van wijlen Hillebrant Iacobsen van Wouw				1645	The Hague	312688959	
Zwahlen	Vve. Zwahlen				1842	Lausanne	715140700	
Zumsteeg	“bei der Wittwe des Componisten”	Luise Andreae		Johann Rudolf Zumsteeg (1760–1802)	1797–1803	Stuttgart	1028636034	only published works by her husband

== See also ==
- List of women printers and publishers before 1800

== Sources ==
- Barbier, Frédéric; Juratic, Sabine; Mellerio, Annick; Anfray, Marie-Cécile (2007). Dictionnaire des imprimeurs, libraires et gens du livre à Paris, 1701-1789. Vol. 1. Genève: Droz. ISBN 978-2-600-01336-9.
- Devriès, Anik; Lesure, François (1979). Dictionnaire des éditeurs de musique français. Vol. 1. Genève: Éditions Minkoff. ISBN 978-2-8266-0460-0.
- Devriès, Anik; Lesure, François (1988). Dictionnaire des éditeurs de musique français. Vol. 2. Genève: Éditions Minkoff. ISBN 978-2-8266-0461-7.
- Humphries, Charles; Smith, William C. (1970). Music Publishing in the British Isles from the Beginning Until the Middle of the Nineteenth Century (Second edition with supplement ed.). New York: Barnes & Noble. ISBN 978-0-389-01369-3.
- "Iberian Books". Iberian Books.
- Weinmann, Alexander (1970). Verzeichnis der Musikalien des Verlages Maisch, Sprenger, Artaria. Beiträge zur Geschichte des Alt-Wiener Musikverlages. Reihe 2. Vol. 2. Wien: Universal Edition. OCLC 1105561.
- Frank, Peter R. (2008). Buchwesen in Wien 1750-1850: kommentiertes Verzeichnis der Buchdrucker, Buchhändler und Verleger. Wiesbaden: Harrassowitz. ISBN 978-3-447-05659-5.
