= Austurdalur =

Valley in Skagafjörður, Iceland

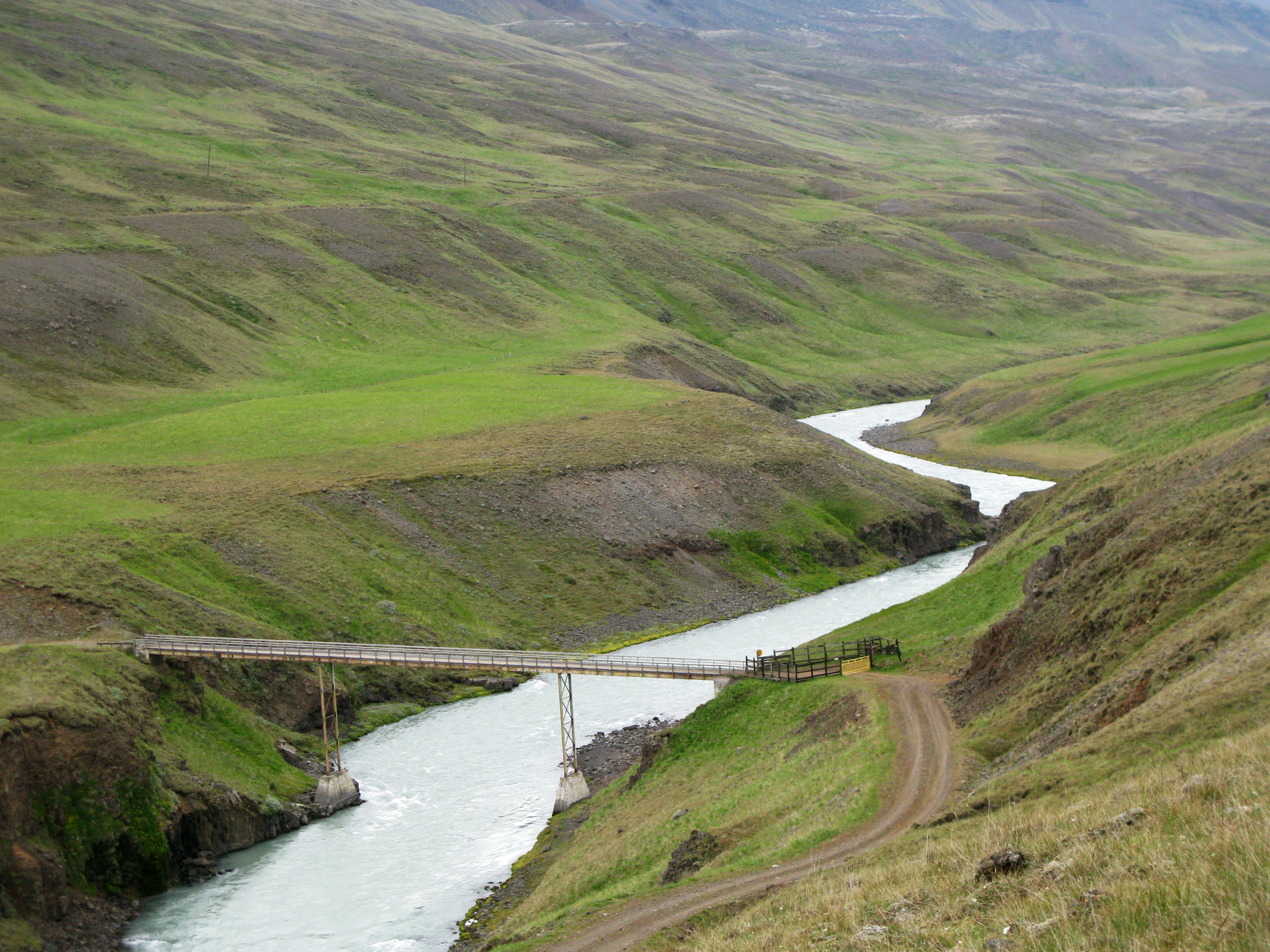
- Monika's bridge over the Austari-Jökulsá in Austurdalur

Geography
- Country: Iceland
- State/Province: Skagafjörður
- Coordinates: 65°19′16.687″N 18°57′42.368″W
- River: Austari-Jökulsá
- Interactive map of Austurdalur

Austurdalur ("east valley") is a valley in interior Skagafjörður, Iceland. The Austari-Jökulsá, one of the two sources of one of the Héraðsvötn's forks, runs through it. The only residence in the valley is at Bústaðir, and there is a church at Ábær.

== Geography ==
The Austari-Jökulsá is a notable feature of Austurdalur's landscape and it runs somewhat to the west along the middle of the valley, although the valley is rather narrow. Inside the valley, the river runs around sandbanks, but when it arrives in Skatastaðir, it forms a very deep gorge, which it rushes through all the way down until it joins the Vestari-Jökulsá, and together they form the Héraðsvötn. There are small birch trees throughout the gorge, and people go white-water rafting there. There is a bridge over the river between Skatastaðir and Bústaðir(both of which are west of the river) often called Monikubrú ("Monika’s bridge") after the influential Monika of Merkigil.

Some tributaries flow into the Jökulsá river, most of which originate at Nýjabæjarfjall mountain, which separates the valley from the interior of Eyjafjörður. The tributaries include Ábæjará, Tinná, Hvíta, Fossá, and other rivers.

The enormous Merkigil gorge in the northernmost part of the valley was, for a long time, the primary obstacle for travelers from the eastern part of the valley getting to town in Skagafjörður. Starting from the southern portion of the valley, there was only a narrow footpath for navigating the edge of the cliff, so it was not possible to transport wool goods to the market in Skagafjörður, but there were cargo paths over Nýjabæjarfjall to Eyjafjörður. This allowed people to travel into Leyningsdalur valley and sell wool in Akureyri. When the farm buildings in Merkigil were built, all the materials were brought in by horse across the gorge. In 1997, Helgi Jónsson, the last farmer in Merkigil, died in the when he fell into the ravine on the way to a meeting with one of his neighbors who was waiting for him on the other side.

The national poet Bólu-Hjálmar built himself a new farm in the valley which he named Nýibær ("new farm") where he lived for a time.

Plant life in the valley is diverse and vegetation has grown along the hillsides. In Fagrahlíð there are natural birch and willow forests, with trees up to six meters tall. Angelica and dwarf fireweed grow in the ravine and on the river's sandbanks.

== Farms ==
Farms on the east side of the valley include Merkigil, Ábær, Nýjibær, Tinnársel, and Hildarsel. Bústaðir and Skatastaðir are on the west side.

== Gallery ==
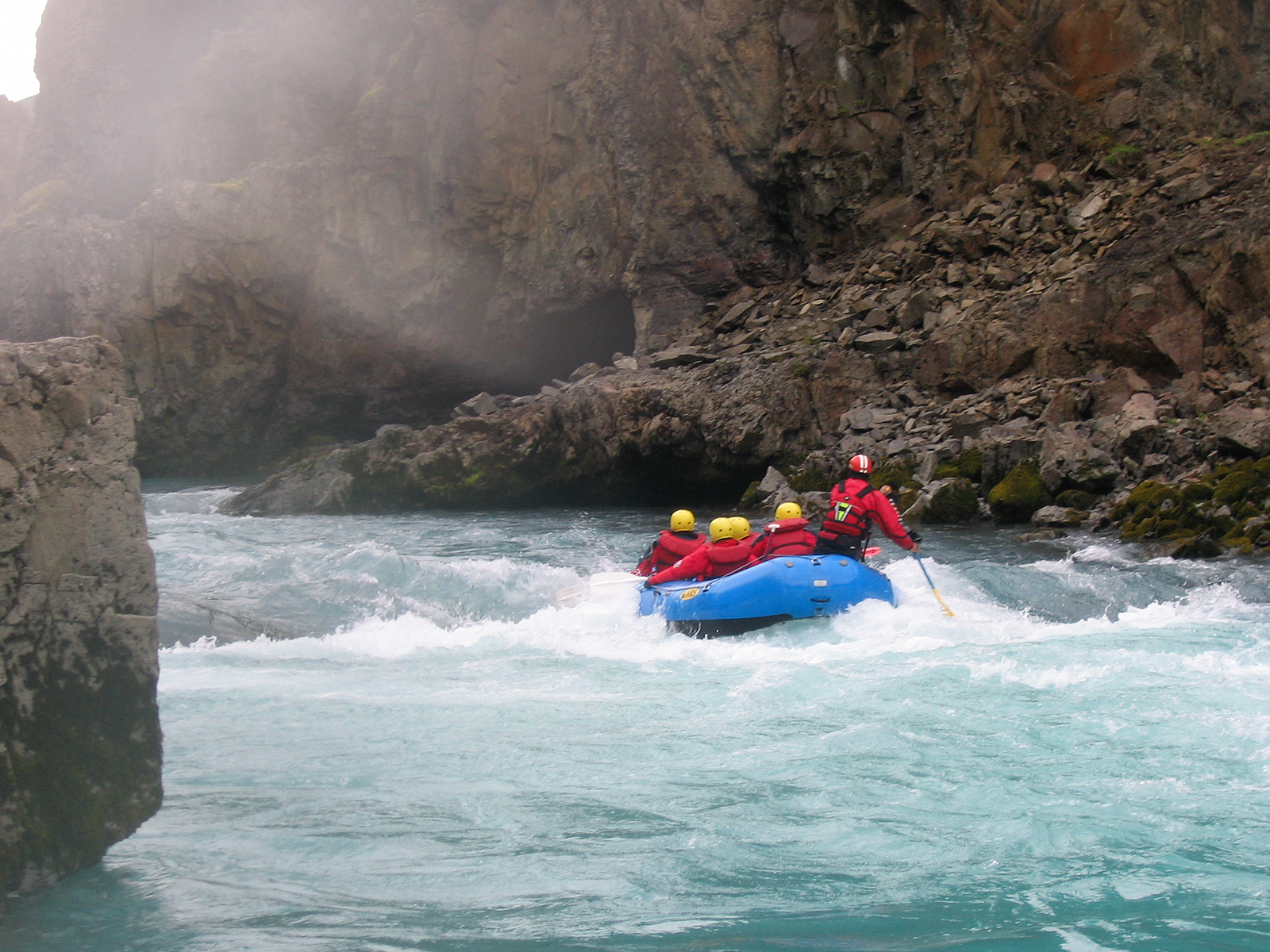
Rafting on the eastern Jökulsá

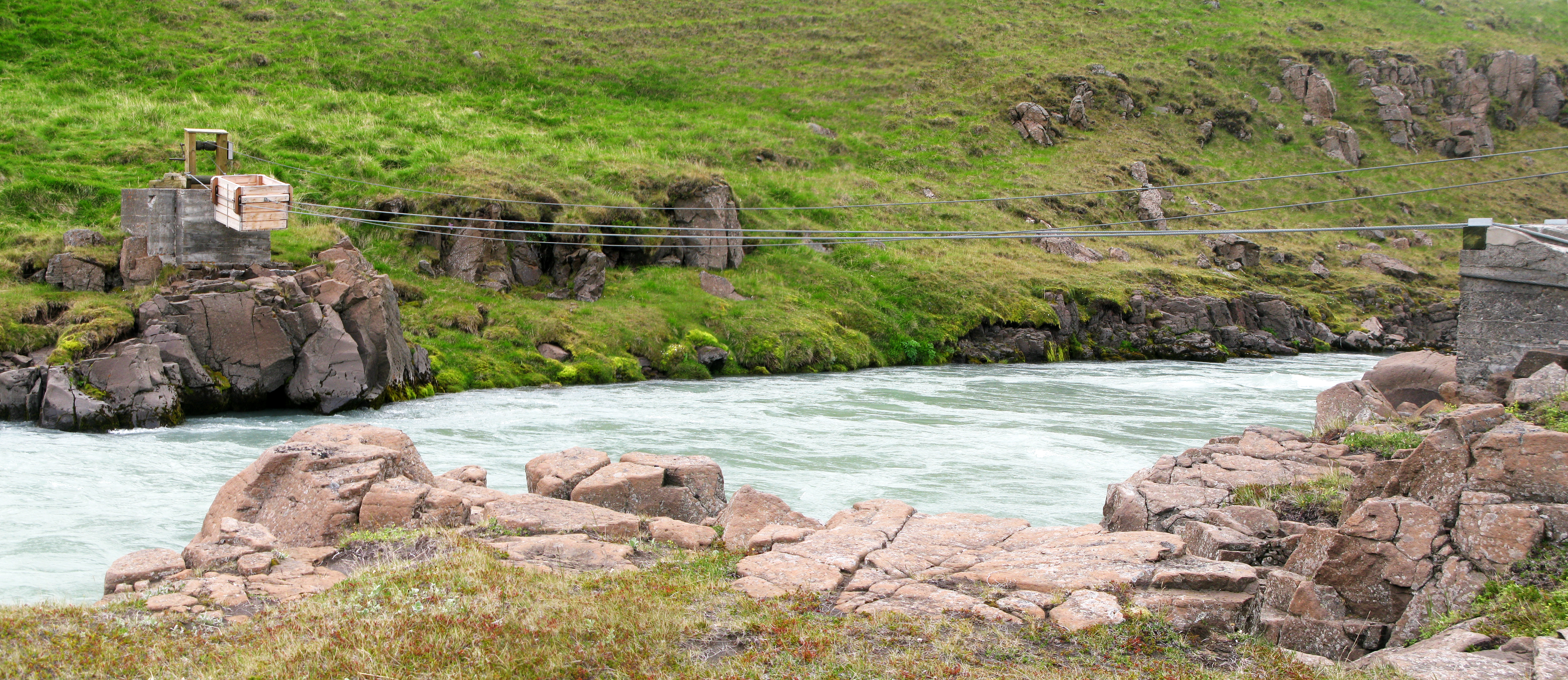
Kálfurinn við Skatastaði

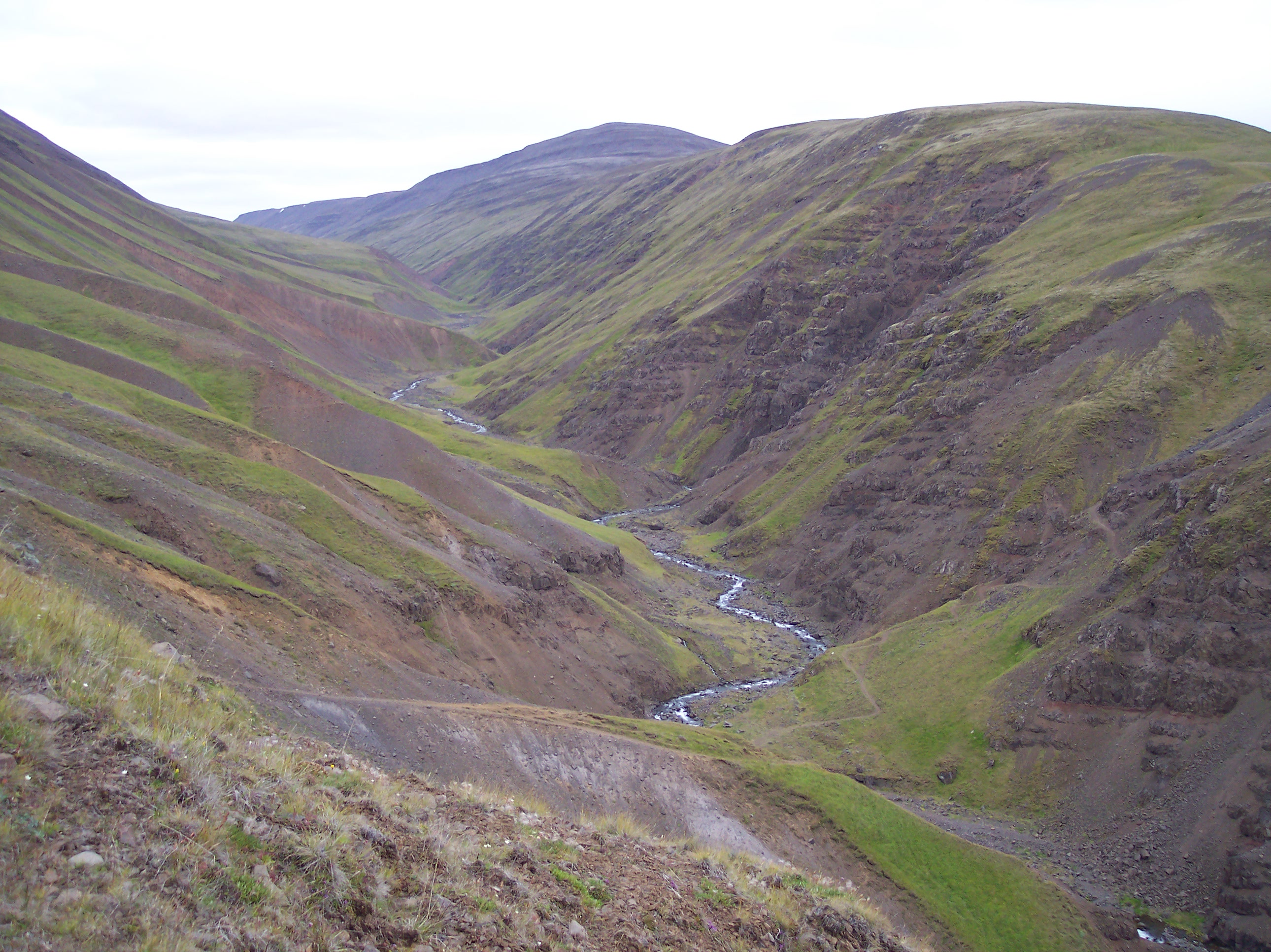
View of a footpath in going up Merkigil

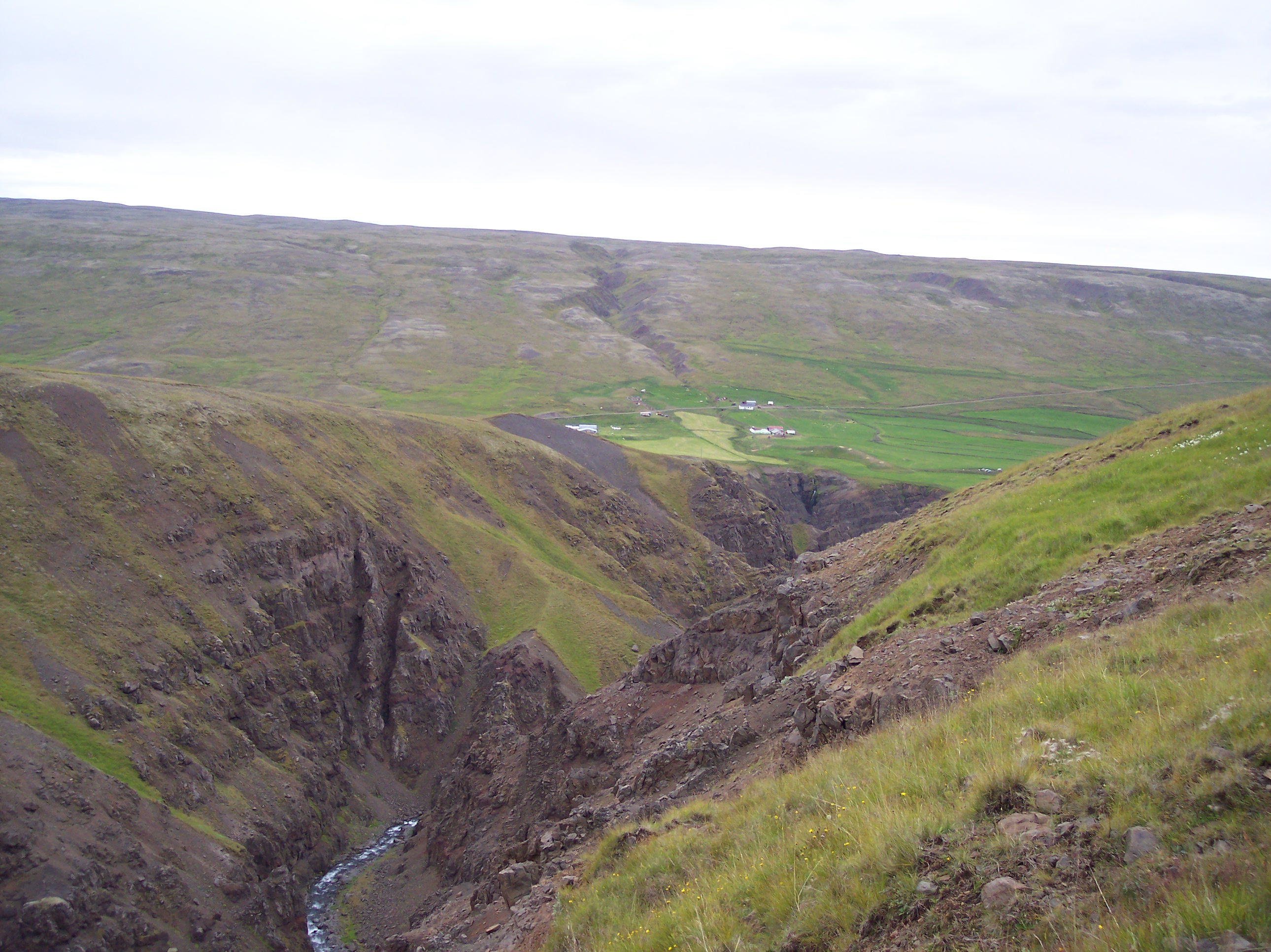
Animal pens west of the river in Bústaðir, west of the river

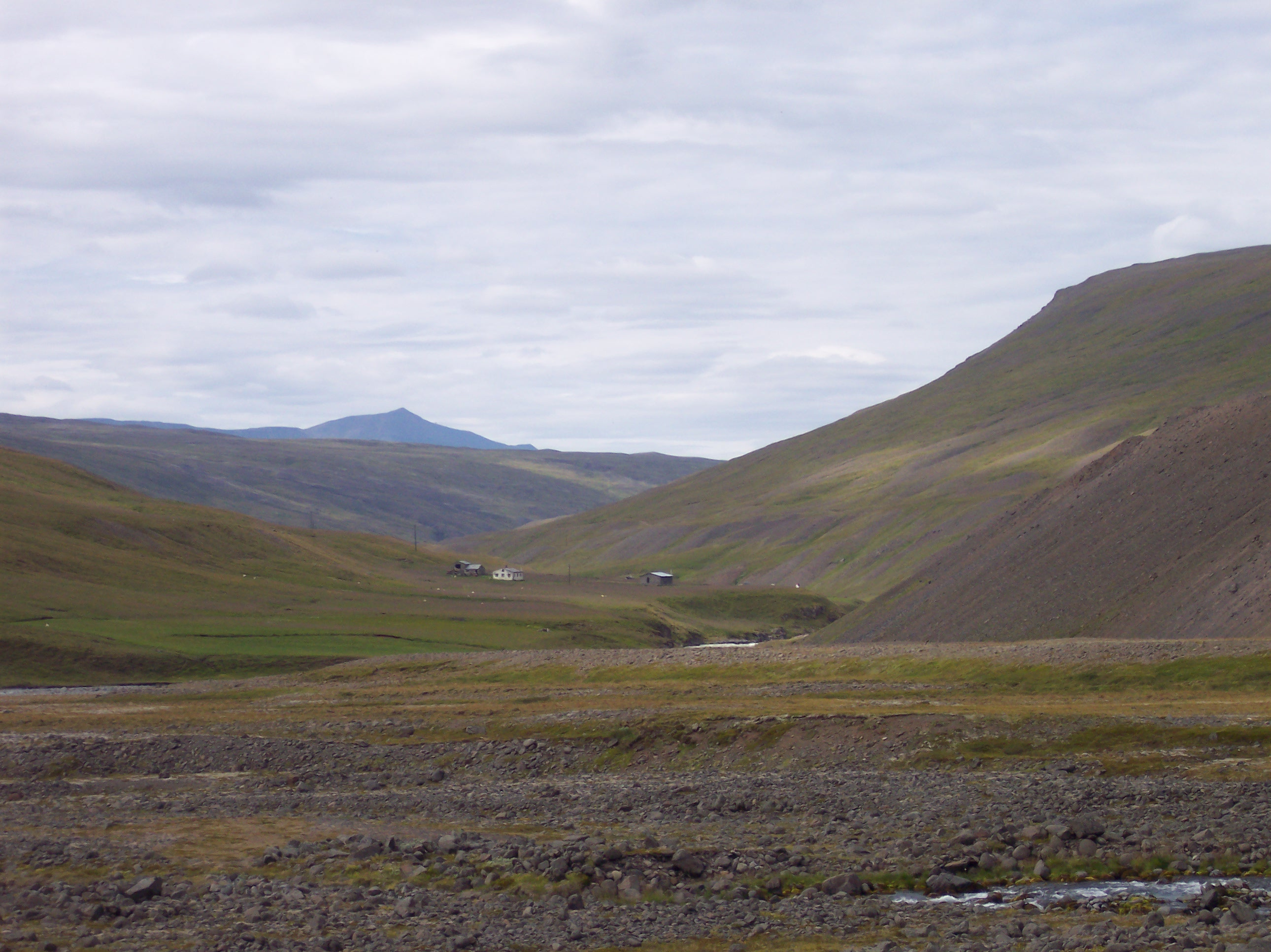
Skatastaðir seen from Ábær

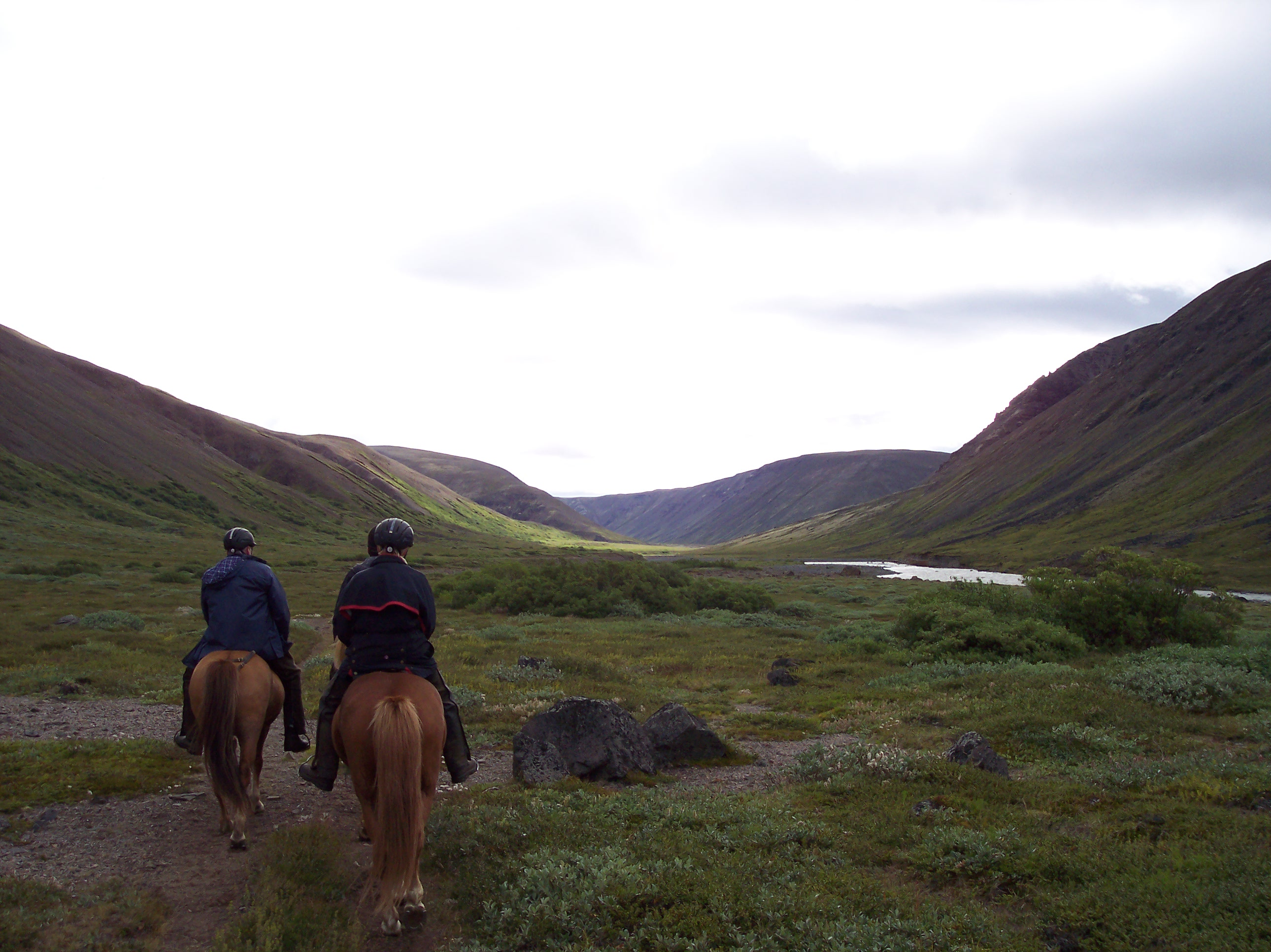
Horse riding in Fagrahlíð, between Hildarsel and Hvítá
