= La veuve Boivin =

Élisabeth Catherine Boivin
- Born: Élisabeth Catherine Ballard; 1704; Paris
- Died: 13 February 1776 (aged 71–72); Chartres
- Other name: La veuve Boivin
- Occupation: Music publisher
- Years active: 1733–1753 (20 years)

"La veuve Boivin" (1704 – 13 February 1776) real name Élisabeth Catherine Boivin, widow of François Boivin and Jean-Christophe Ballard's daughter, was an 18th-century French music publisher in Paris.

The music publishing house was founded in 1721 by François Boivin (circa 1693-1733) and his uncle, Michel Pignolet de Montéclair. It was located rue Saint-Honoré, under the banner "À la Règle d’Or" (at the Golden Rule). At the death of François Boivin, his widow took over the management of the company.

Her mark was found on many scores published and sold in Paris until 1753 when she sold her business to Marc Bayard, another music publisher. She died in Chartres in 1776.

== See also ==
- List of women music publishers before 1900

== Sources ==
- Devriès, Anik; Lesure, François (1979). Dictionnaire des éditeurs de musique français. Vol. 1. Paris: Editions Minkoff. ISBN 9782826604532.
