= Route 85 (Iceland) =

Road in Iceland

Route 85
- Norðausturvegur

Major junctions
- Eastern end: Route 1 Þjóðvegur
- Western end: Route 1 Þjóðvegur

Location
- Country: Iceland

Highway system
- Roads in Iceland

Norðausturvegur (Icelandic pronunciation: [ˈnɔrðˌœystʏrˌvɛːɣʏr̥], lit. 'Northeast Road') or Route 85 is a primary road in northeastern Iceland. It connects Húsavík, Tjörneshreppur, Þórshöfn, Bakkafjörður, and Vopnafjörður to the main road network.
