= Vesturdalur =

Valley in Skagafjörður, Iceland

Naming
- English translation: West valley

Geography
- Country: Iceland
- State/Province: Skagafjörður
- Population centers: Goðdalir
- Coordinates: 65°18′2.239″N 19°2′58.664″W
- River: Vestari-Jökulsá, Hofsá (Vesturdalur)

Vesturdalur ("west valley") is a valley that runs from the head of Skagafjörður, Iceland and cuts far into the central highlands. Austurdalur valley runs parallel to it. The valleys are surrounded by tall, steep mountains.

== Geography ==
The lowest town in western Vesturdalur is the church site Goðdalir. Just inside the valley, the Vestari-Jökulsá river flows out of Hofsdalur valley, which is very long and goes south into the highlands. The valley is narrow and uninhabited. The river that runs along Vesturdalur and flows into Vestari-Jökulsá is, however, named Hofsá and is mostly a spring creek. This river is named for Hof (Hof í Vesturdal), settled by Eiríkur Hróaldsson, who owned all the land south up to Hofsjökull glacier.

The valley's eastern side has a few farms, including Bjarnastaðahlíð, Litlahlíð, and Gil. The abandoned farm Þorljótsstaðir is farther into the valley and was for many years the valley's innermost farm, however there were even more farms deeper into the valley in previous centuries. The valley narrows within Þorljótsstaðir, and it is well covered in vegetation. Because there are good grazing lands there, there are many visible signs of habitation.

== History ==
Hraunþúfuklaustur abbey is on the valley floor. These are ruins that, according to folklore, had once been a monastery that fell into disuse during the Black Plague, but later, several objects were found there, like a church bell. While no sources about the monastery before human habitation, it has been supposed that the ruins are from shelter huts for people walking the area.
