= Lydia Bailey (printer) =

19th-century Philadelphia printer

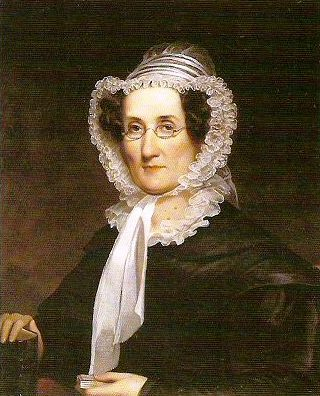
- Born: Lydia Steele; February 1, 1779; Lancaster County, Pennsylvania, US
- Died: February 21, 1869 (aged 90)
- Occupation: Printer

Lydia Bailey (February 1, 1779 – February 21, 1869) was a printer in Philadelphia from 1808 to 1861.

== Early life ==
Lydia Bailey was born Lydia Steele in Lancaster County, Pennsylvania, the daughter of Captain William Steele and Elizabeth Bailey. The Steeles were a prosperous Lancaster family; William, his father, and his brothers all served with distinction in the American Revolution. The brothers Steele established a paper mill in Lancaster County after the war and became important players in Philadelphia politics. Lydia Bailey's mother, Elizabeth Steele, was herself born a Bailey, the sister of the prominent Revolutionary-era printers, Jacob and Francis Bailey. Francis Bailey is now recognized as one of the United States' first type-founders and an official printer for Congress and the Commonwealth of Pennsylvania.

In the spring of 1797 Lydia Steele married her cousin, Robert Bailey, who was managing his father Francis's Philadelphia printing office at the time; they had four children. She worked alongside her husband in his struggling efforts to run a successful printing enterprise until his death in 1808. Contemporary newspapers reported that Bailey was left impoverished with her family to support, but she was able to begin her career by immediately paying off her husband's debts thanks to the important social network of which she was a part. Utilizing the connections already established by her husband and his extended family, not to mention her own blood relatives, she transformed her husband's floundering business into one of the busiest printing establishments in 19th century Philadelphia.

== Career ==
Initially, she turned for help and business to associates such as her uncles Francis Bailey and John Steele (who, as the collector of the Port of Philadelphia and a member of the city's common council, was a man of great influence) and to the publisher Mathew Carey. Philip Freneau, the poet of the Revolution, learned of the young widow's plight and agreed in 1809 to have her publish a third collected edition of his poems, which proved highly successful for both. Favored by the Whig administration, which Steele and Carey in particular supported, she succeeded in getting contracts with a number of government agencies early in her career. In 1813 Bailey obtained the contract to become Philadelphia's official city printer—a post she mostly held until the mid-1850s—further increasing her income and visibility as a printer. Subsequently she acquired steady contracts for job printing with the University of Pennsylvania and various banks and canal companies.

Bailey was a staunch Presbyterian and a member of the Third Presbyterian Church, which she endowed heavily; she printed much material for the church and religious-based charitable organizations such as the Female Tract Society, the Orphan Society, the Indigent Widows' and Single Women's Society, and the Ladies' Liberia School Association. Her father-in-law had helped establish the Swedenborgian Church of North America, and Lydia Bailey for years printed for that church as well.

Although Bailey occasionally published books and pamphlets on her own during the early years, she chose to concentrate her shop's energies on book and job printing for others as she matured. The blank forms, almanacs, annual reports, booksellers' catalogs, broadsides, and chapbooks that she printed provided steady, plentiful business, reflecting mid-century developments in the printing trade in which larger and more specialized firms replaced the small family-run general printing shops of the earlier period.

Bailey was the master printer of a shop that at its peak was one of the largest in the city, employing more than forty workers. Many of her employees went on to respectable careers as bookmen in their own right, among them Alexander Baird, Robert P. King, and John Fagan. Her only son, William Robert, entered the shop around the time of his father's death and eventually became a foreman, but never took over his mother's reins. When he died in 1861, she retired, at the age of eighty-two. By this time printing plants of steam-powered presses were churning out more business at lower costs than even the most established, productive hand-press shops; one obituary romantically reported that "steam presses were fatal to her courage and she surrendered to an instrumentality she could neither comprehend nor compete with." For whatever reasons, Lydia Bailey never embraced the new technology and simply closed her business on her retirement. She died in Philadelphia soon after her ninetieth birthday.

== Legacy ==
Women have been involved in the printing trades since Gutenberg's day, mostly as widows, wives, and daughters. Many of them had highly successful careers, but Bailey's stands out for its five decade tenure. As such she can be seen very much as a part of a long tradition which was based on commercial production patterns prior to the Industrial Revolution that relied heavily on these tradeswomen for their business acumen.

A contemporary printing historian, William McCulloch, reported that Bailey "carried on the printing business with success and reputation." Multiple obituaries noted the respect she had achieved in the printing world and spoke highly of her local reputation. Factory-based modes of production introduced in the late 18th century and the rise of the Victorian Cult of Domesticity deeply affected women's traditional abilities to participate in roles of authority in large commercial operations. Consequently, Bailey has the distinction of being the last of the widow printers.

== See also ==
- List of women music publishers before 1900
