= Robert Proctor (bibliographer) =

English bibliographer

Robert George Collier Proctor
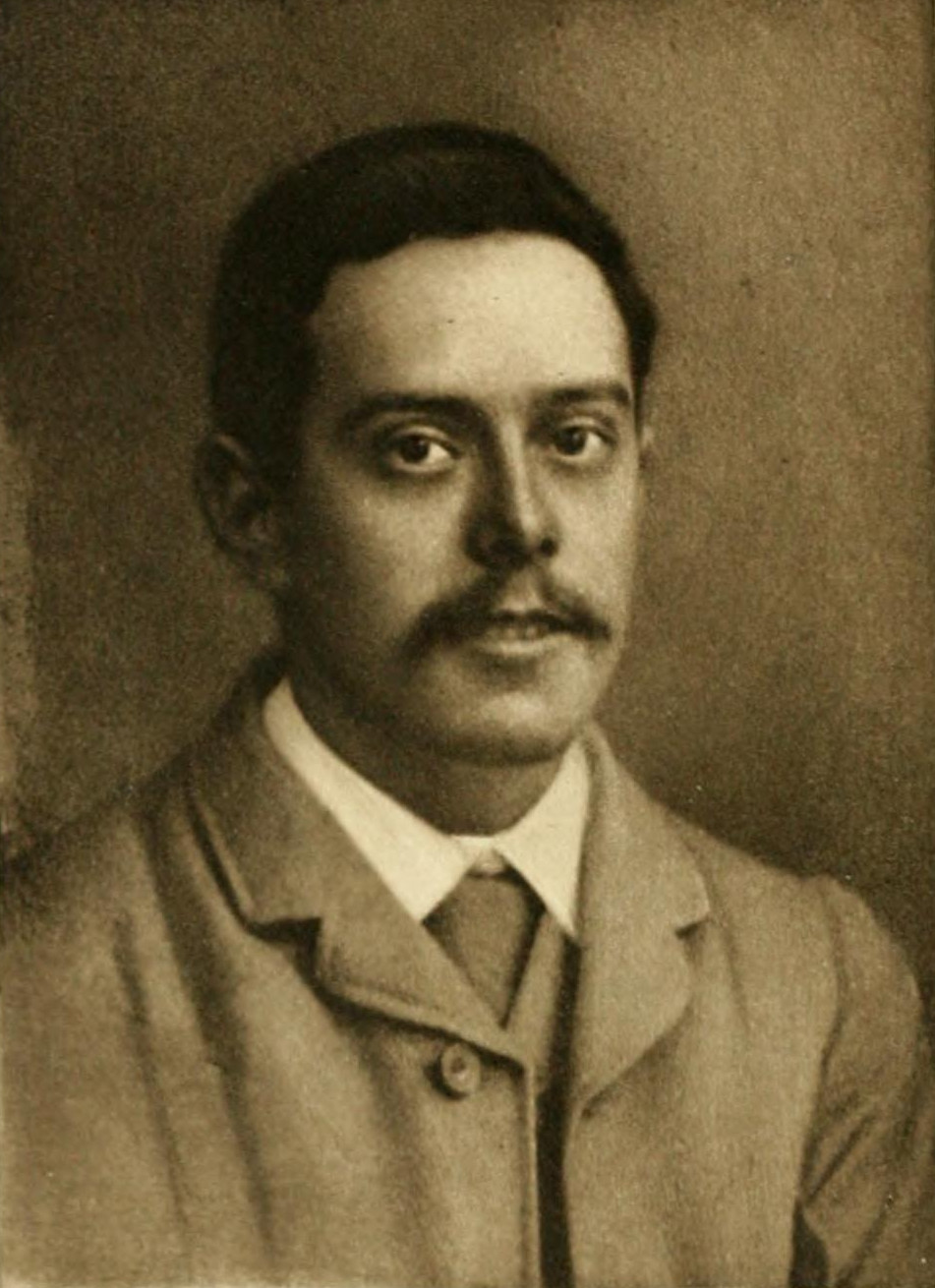
- Born: 13 May 1868; Budleigh Salterton, Devon, England
- Disappeared: 5 September 1903 (aged 35); Near Pitztal, Tyrol, Austria
- Status: Declared dead in absentia 6 September 1903 (aged 35)
- Occupations: Bibliographer and librarian

Robert George Collier Proctor (13 May 1868 – 6 September 1903), often published as R. G. C. Proctor, was an English bibliographer, librarian, book collector, and expert on incunabula and early typography.

== Early life and education ==
Proctor was born in Budleigh Salterton, Devon on 13 May 1868, to Robert Proctor and Anne Tate, and was a distant relative of John Payne Collier. He earned a Bachelor of Arts degree in classics from Corpus Christi College, Oxford, in 1890. While at Oxford, where he was known for his book collection, Proctor's interest in antiquarian studies, archaeology, and bibliography grew and he compiled a catalogue of incunabula and early printed books in the library collection at Corpus Christi College. Proctor continued his studies of early printing at Oxford, cataloging incunabula at the Bodleian Library, New College and Brasenose College.

== Professional life ==
Proctor joined the British Museum on 16 October 1893 as an assistant in the Department of Printed Books. He quickly became an expert on early typography and began describing every known European type fount used before 1520. Proctor rearranged all of the incunabula in the British Museum geographically by place of printing in what is known today as "Proctor order" and he compiled An Index to the Early Printed Books in the British Museum: From the Invention of Printing to the Year 1500 which was issued in four parts from 1898 to 1903. Proctor developed a Greek typeface based on type found in the Complutensian Polyglot Bible. Working with William Morris at the Kelmscott Press, Proctor grew interested in Icelandic literature and published translations of the Vápnfirðinga saga and the Laxdæla saga in 1902 and 1903, respectively.

== Death ==
In August 1903 Proctor began a solo walking tour in the Austrian Alps. He left Pitztal on 5 September without a guide and was never heard from again. In December 1903 a judge granted an order presuming Proctor's death on 6 September of that year. His friend, Sydney Cockerell, speculated that Proctor may have committed suicide.

== Legacy ==
After Proctor's death a memorial fund was established and used to collect and publish (in 1905) his Bibliographical Essays. The fund also provided for the compilation and publication of the three remaining parts of Proctor's index of early printed books covering the years 1501 to 1520. Even today, some large collections of incunabula are arranged in "Proctor order" ("This means that the books are arranged and described in order of country of origin, then of town, then of printer, in chronological order").

== Bibliography ==
Selected writings of Robert Proctor:

- Proctor, Robert (1894). Jan van Doesborgh, Printer at Antwerp: An Essay in Bibliography. Illustrated Monographs 2. London: Printed for the Bibliographical Society at the Chiswick Press.
- Proctor, Robert (1897). A Classified Index to the Serapeum. London: Printed for the Bibliographical Society by Blades, East & Blades.
- Pollard, Alfred W.; Proctor, Robert, eds. (1899). Three Hundred Notable Books Added to the Library of the British Museum under the Keepership of Richard Garnett, 1890–1899. [Edinburgh]: Printed by T. and A. Constable for the editors and subscribers.
- Proctor, Robert (1900). The Printing of Greek in the Fifteenth Century. Illustrated Monographs 8. [Oxford]: Printed for the Bibliographical Society at the Oxford University Press.
- Proctor, Robert (1904). Αἰσχυλου Ὀρεστεια [text of Aeschylus ... prepared by Robert Proctor]. London: Chiswick Press.
- Proctor, Robert (1905). Bibliographical Essays. London: Chiswick Press.
- Duff, E. G.; Greg, W. W.; McKerrow, R. B.; Plomer, H. R.; Pollard, A. W.; Proctor, R. (1913). Hand-lists of Books Printed by London Printers, 1501–1556. London: Printed by Blades, East & Blades for the Bibliographical Society.
- Proctor, Robert (2010). Bowman, J. H. (ed.). A Critical Edition of the Private Diaries of Robert Proctor: The Life of a Librarian at the British Museum. Lewiston: Edwin Mellen Press. ISBN 978-0-7734-3634-3. OCLC 586123221.

== See also ==
- History of books
