= Selá (Vopnafjörður) =

River in Iceland

Coordinates: 65.768889°N 15.006667°W

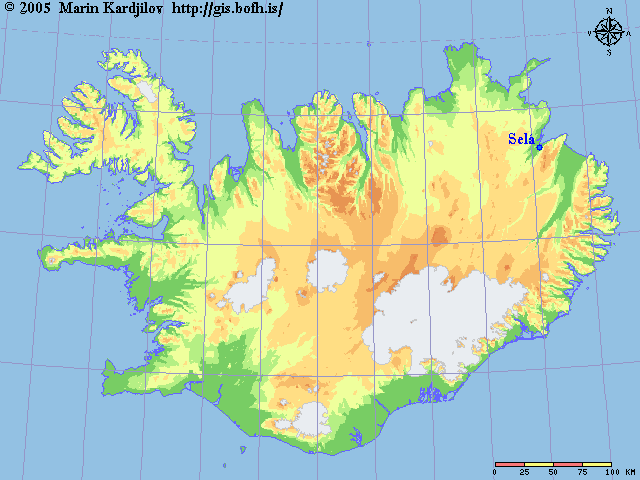
Location of Selá

Selá (Icelandic pronunciation: [ˈsɛːlˌauː]) is a river in Vopnafjörður, Iceland, and one of Iceland's most exclusive rivers for salmon angling.

Selá river is originated from many small rivers coming from the highlands, which run from a mountain area called Dimmufjallgarður (Dark Mountains).

Originally the salmon could go about 20 km up the river. However, two fish ladders have been built in the river adding about 18 more kilometers to the stretch the salmon can run up for spawning. The first ladder was built in 1967 and the second in 2011.

Selá is visited by a number of Icelandic and foreign anglers every summer. In 2004, "The Golden Bear" golf champion Jack Nicklaus fished Selá, and in July 2006 former US president George H. W. Bush spent several days angling.

Icelandic Entrepreneur Orri Vigfússon leads conservation efforts at Selá.
