= Konrad Haebler =

Konrad Haebler (29 October 1857 – 13 December 1946) was a German (Saxonian) librarian, historian and expert on incunabula.

He studied philology in Leipzig and worked in the royal public library in his native Dresden from 1879. He specialized in the history and literature of Habsburg Spain. His research into the economic history of Spain led to an interest in early prints. From 1898, he was in charge of cataloguing the incunabula of the Königliche Öffentliche Bibliothek in Dresden. For this purpose he began to compile a systematic comparison of types. This led to the publication of his 1905 Typenrepertorium. From 1904 to 1920, he chaired the commission editing the Gesamtkatalog der Wiegendrucke. From 1907, he was at the royal library in Berlin, and from 1914 curator of the manuscript section there.

== Bibliography ==
- Die wirtschaftliche Blüte Spaniens im 16. Jahrhundert und ihr Verfall (1888).
- The early printers of Spain and Portugal (1897).
- Typenrepertorium der Wiegendrucke (1905).
- Geschichte Spaniens unter den Habsburgern (1907).
- Handbuch der Inkunabelkunde (1925).
- Rollen- und Plattenstempel des 16. Jahrhunderts (1928–29).
