= Vestari-Jökulsá =

Glacier river in Skagafjörður, Iceland

Vestari-Jökulsá Jökulsá vestri
- Etymology: Western Glacier River

Location
- Country: Iceland
- County: Skagafjörður

Physical characteristics
- Source: Hofsjökull
- Mouth
  - coordinates: 65°22′20″N 19°6′30″W

Basin features
- Progression: Austari-Jökulsá, Héraðsvötn
- Tributaries
  - right: Hofsá

Vestari-Jökulsá or Jökulsá vestri (English: Western Glacier River) is a glacier river in Skagafjörður, Iceland. It originates in the northwest corner of Hofsjökull and is formed from many branches that fall together and flow northward. The beginning of the river runs through relatively low-pitched and level land, through a deep canyon, called Þröngagil. It then follows the length of a valley finally falling into Vesturdalur to the northeast, where Hofsá ("Temple river") flows into it. Hofsá runs briefly along Vesturdalur, before joining the Austari-Jökulsá at Tunguháll, at which point the rivers are known as the Héraðsvötn.

There have been discussions about using both rivers for power plants, with various possible locations under consideration, though most discussions have revolved around a potential power plant in Villinganes, located a little below the confluence. Others want to grant the rivers protected status.

White-water rafting is available on both the Vestari- and Austari-Jökulsá, which are considered particularly well suited to this activity.

== Bibliography ==
- Hallgrímur Jónasson: Árbók Ferðafélags Íslands. Skagafjörður. Ferðafélag Íslands, 1946.
- Hjalti Pálsson (ritstj.): Byggðasaga Skagafjarðar II. bindi. Lýtingsstaðahreppur. Sögufélag Skagfirðinga, 2004. ISBN 978-9979-861-13-4
