= Raimundo Diosdado Caballero =

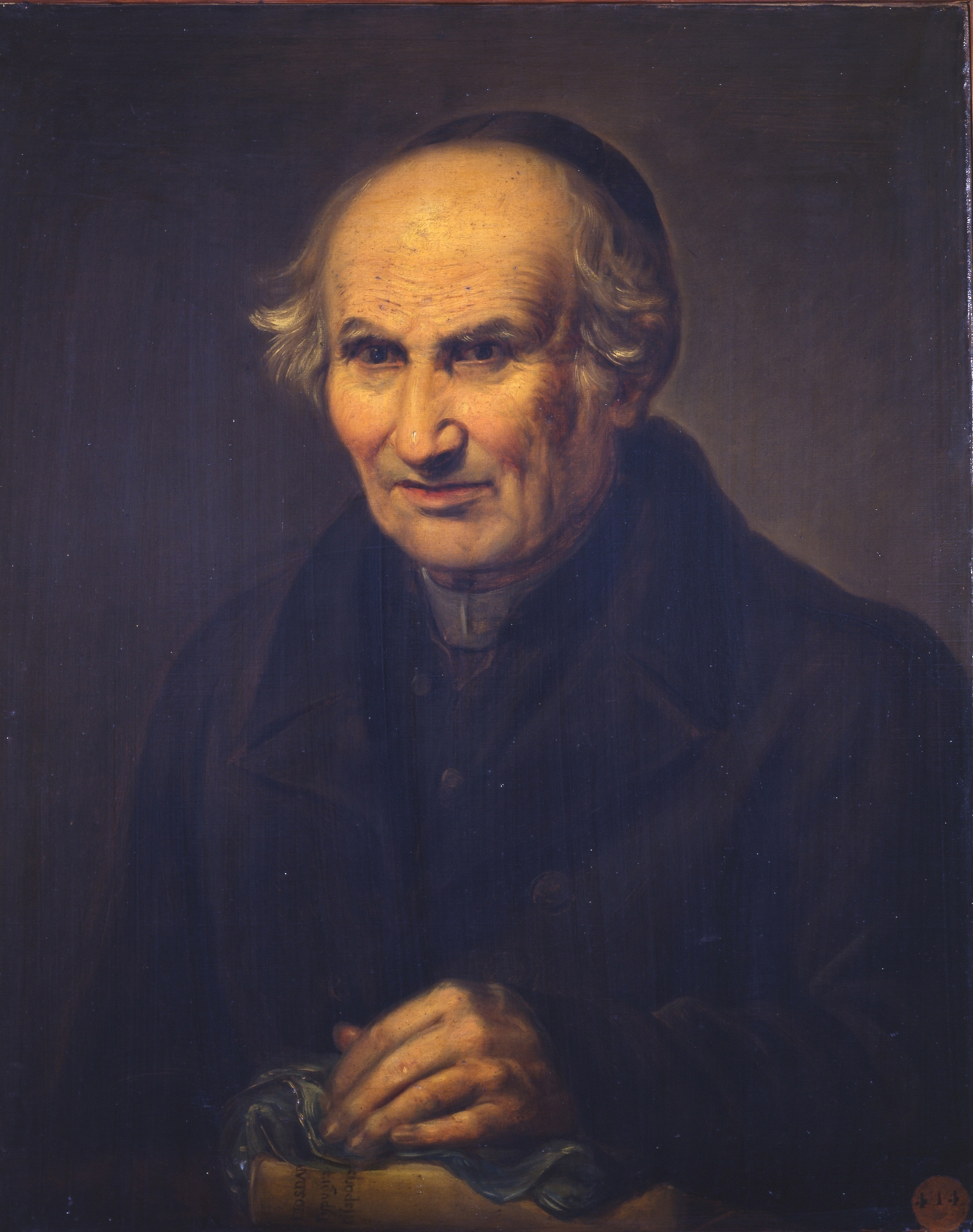
Raimundo Diosdado Caballero

Raimundo Diosdado Caballero (June 19, 1740 – January 16, 1830 or April 28, 1829) was a Catholic miscellaneous writer, chiefly ecclesiastical.

Born at Palma in the island of Mallorca on June 19, 1740. He entered the Society of Jesus on November 15, 1752, held the chair of literature in the Jesuit College at Madrid for several years, and was deported with the other Jesuits to Italy when the Society was suppressed in the Spanish dominions.

The exact date of his death is uncertain, but it is believed he died at Rome on either January 16, 1830 or April 28, 1829.

== Works ==
Caballero's chief works include:

- De Prima typographiae hispanicae aetate specimen (Rome, 1793);
- Commentariola critica, primum de disciplina arcani, secundum de lingua evangelica (Rome, 1798). The author corrects in this work what he considers to be the mistakes of Emmanuel Schelstrate and Hardouin, and offers a proof that the native tongue of Christ and the Apostles was Syriac, not Greek, as Domenico Diodati (d. 1801) had maintained in his De Christo loquente exercitatio (Naples, 1767).
- Bibliothecae Scriptorum Societatis Jesu supplementa. Supplementum primum (Rome, 1814),
  - Supplementum primum (Rome, 1814),
  - Supplementum alterum (Rome, 1816).

On Scriptural topics:

- Tetraglotton D. Marci Evangelium, et Marcologia critica
- El Evangelio de S. Marcos escrito en latin, griego y hebreo, con los tres alfabetos.

On American topics:

- Observaciones americanas, y supplemento critico á la historia de México
- Medios para estrechar más la union entre espanoles americanos y europeos
- Consideraciones americanas.
