= Iberian Books =

Bibliographic database

Iberian Books is a bibliographical research project set up to chart the development of printing in Spain, Portugal and the New World in the early-modern period. It offers a catalogue of what was known to have been printed, along with a survey of surviving copies and links to digital editions. It is funded by the Andrew W. Mellon Foundation. The records created are made available in an open-access database under a Creative Commons license.

Established in 2007 and based in the School of History at University College Dublin, as of December 2016 the project has made available data for the period from the beginning of printing in the Iberian Peninsula around 1472 to the middle of the seventeenth century. In late 2017, the project expects to publish the datasets for the second half of the seventeenth century. The datasets currently available online (1472-1650) hold information on 66,000 items, 339,000 copies, and 15,000 digital copies.

The project works in partnership with the Digital Library Group at University College Dublin and with the Universal Short Title Catalogue Project based at the University of St Andrews.

== Project ==
Iberian Books is a bibliographical resource similar to the English Short Title Catalogue, helping to identify works by a given author or publisher, or on a given subject. In addition, it helps in identifying and mapping broader publishing trends. The datasets are published via a platform that facilitates the Open Archives Initiative Protocol for Metadata Harvesting (OAI-PMH) harvesting of metadata in OAI-compliant Dublin Core and Metadata Object Description Schema (MODS) formats. The datasets have also been incorporated in the open-access Universal Short Title Catalogue (USTC) based at the University of St Andrews.

The dataset has been cited in academic monographs and journal articles, and by major auction houses.

== See also ==
- Books in Spain

== Publications ==
- Alexander S. Wilkinson (ed.), Iberian Books. Books Published in Spanish or Portuguese or on the Iberian Peninsula before 1601, (Leiden: Brill, 2010)
- Alexander S. Wilkinson and Alejandra Ulla Lorenzo, Iberian Books (Volumes II & III). Libros Ibéricos Volúmene II. Books published in Spain, Portugal and the New World or elsewhere in Spanish or Portuguese between 1601 and 1650. Libros publicados en España, Portugal y el Nuevo Mundo o en otros lugares en español o portugués entre 1601 y 1650, (Leiden: Brill, 2015)
- Alexander S. Wilkinson, 'Exploring the Print World of Early-Modern Iberia', Bulletin of Spanish Studies (2012), 89 (4):491-506.
- Fernando Rodríguez-Gallego López and Alejandra Ulla Lorenzo, Un fondo desconocido de comedias españolas impresas conservado en la Biblioteca Pública de Évora (con un estudio detallado de las de Calderón de la Barca) (New York: IDEA (Colección Batihoja), 2016).
- Alexander S. Wilkinson and Alejandra Ulla Lorenzo (eds.), A Maturing Market: The Iberian Book World in the first half of the seventeenth century (Leiden: Brill, 2017).
- Alexander S. Wilkinson, Alejandra Ulla Lorenzo and Alba de la Cruz, ‘A Survey of Broadsheets Printed in Spain, 1472-1700’ in Andrew Pettegree (ed.), Broadsheets in Early Modern Europe (Leiden: Brill, 2017).
- Alexander S. Wilkinson, ‘Peripheral print cultures in Renaissance Europe’, in Crawford Gribben and Kathleen Miller (eds), Dublin - Renaissance City of Literature (Manchester: Manchester University Press, 2016).
- Alejandra Ulla Lorenzo, ‘Juegos, versos y festines de damas en Calderón’, in Bulletin of the Comediantes, 66.2 (2015), pp. 195 - 209.
- Alejandra Ulla Lorenzo, ‘La construcción del espacio en El mayor encanto, amor de Calderón’, Tintas. Quaderni di letterature iberiche e iberoamericane, 5 (2015), pp. 77 – 98.
