= Vopnafjörður =

Vopnafjarðarhreppur
- Municipality
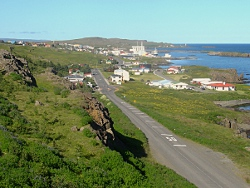
- Skyline of Vopnafjarðarhreppur

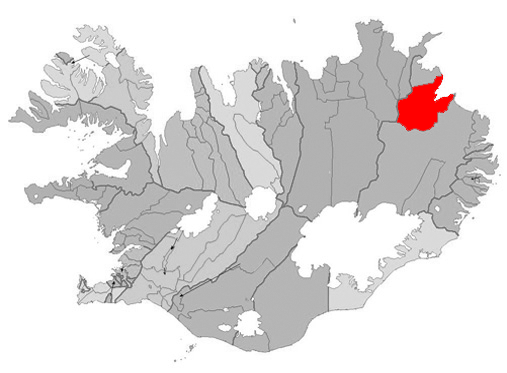
- Location of Vopnafjarðarhreppur

- Location within Iceland
- Coordinates: 65°45′N 14°50′W
- Country: Iceland
- Region: Eastern Region
- Constituency: Northeast Constituency

Government
  - Manager: Sara Elísabet Svansdóttir

Area
  - Total: 1,903 km^{2} (735 sq mi)

Population
  - Total: 695
  - Density: 0.37/km^{2} (0.96/sq mi)
- Postal code(s): 690
- Municipal number: 7502
- Website: vopnafjardarhreppur.is

Vopnafjörður (Icelandic pronunciation: [ˈvɔhpnaˌfjœrðʏr̥], meaning weapon fjord) is a village and municipality in Northeast Iceland, standing on a peninsula in the middle of a mountainous bay by the same name. The main industries of Vopnafjörður are fish processing, agriculture and tourism and other services.

== Overview ==
Vopnafjörður is known for its salmon rivers and large areas of untouched landscape. Hofsá and Selá are two of the most exclusive salmon rivers in Iceland. The salmon rivers and other attractions in and around Vopnafjörður have drawn numerous foreign visitors, including artists, celebrities and politicians such as Charles, Prince of Wales, George Bush, Sr., Jack Nicklaus and Queen Paola of Belgium.

Vopnafjörður is on Route 85 and has an airport with scheduled flights to Akureyri on business days. Other services include Vopnafjarðarskóli primary school with 99 students, Leikskólinn Brekkubær preschool, Landsbankinn bank and Heilbrigðisstofnun Austurlands clinic.

Brim hf., Iceland's largest fishing company, is the largest employer in the area. The company runs a high-tech freezing plant and a fishmeal factory in Vopnafjörður.

== History ==
The bay of Vopnafjörður was first settled by Vikings in the late 9th century CE. The name Vopnafjörður (Old Norse: Vápnafjǫrðr [ˈvɑːpnɑˌfjɔrðr]) literally means "Weapon Fjord" or "Weapon Bay", and comes from the nickname of one of the settlers, Eyvindur vopni.

Disputes between local chieftains led to a number of killings in the 10th century. The story of the disputes is told in Vopnfirðinga saga, one of the classic Sagas of Icelanders, a series of epic family histories written in the 13th century.

Little is known about the history of Vopnafjörður after Iceland lost its independence to Norway in 1264. Foreign merchants sailed to Vopnafjörður in the early modern age, and it was one of three trade ports in East Iceland in the 17th and 18th centuries.

The Danish trading company Ørum & Wulff had extensive operations in Vopnafjörður in the 19th century. A local cooperative, Kaupfélag Vopnfirðinga, was established in 1918, and was one of Vopnafjörður's largest employers throughout the 20th century, but filed for bankruptcy in 2004.

In the late 19th century, poor farmers were forced to move into the mountains above Vopnafjörður, when they could no longer afford living on densely populated land in the lowlands. For several decades, many families lived in the highlands, experiencing extreme hardship. The highland farms inspired the setting of the novel Independent People by Halldór Laxness. The book helped him win the Nobel Prize in Literature in 1955.

Modern infrastructure, including roads, harbors and bridges, was first introduced in Vopnafjörður in the early 20th century. Today, new infrastructure is of highest standards.

=== Emigration to America ===
Vopnafjörður was the largest port of Icelandic emigration to America in the late 19th and early 20th centuries. Thousands of North Americans have ancestors who lived in Vopnafjörður.

== Geography ==
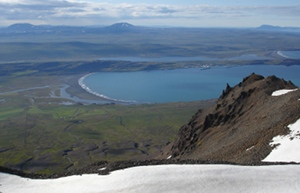
The bay seen from the top of Krossavík Mountains.

Vopnafjörður is located in Northeast Iceland. The Vopnafjörður area coastline is characterized by the Tangi [ˈtʰauɲcɪ] peninsula, coastal rocks, islets, coves, river mouths, and black sand beaches.

During the Ice Age (up to 10,000 years ago) a large glacier covered the bay. The Ice Age glacier carved the diverse mountains and rock formations that characterize the area. After the Ice Age, the land rose as the heavy load of the glacier fell away, and began to look as it does today.

The largest river to run into the bay is Hofsá, one of the best known salmon-fishing rivers in the country. Krossavík Mountains at 1,077 metres (3,533 ft), tower over the bay.

The village of Vopnafjörður is located on the Tangi peninsula in the middle of the bay. Surrounding farms reach far into Hofsárdalur [ˈhɔfsˌaurˌtaːlʏr̥] and Vesturárdalur [ˈvɛstʏrˌaurˌtaːlʏr̥] valleys, and to the northern coast of the bay.

== Climate ==
Vopnafjörður has a rainy, mild winter subarctic climate (Köppen: Dfc; Trewartha: Eolo) or a subpolar oceanic climate (Cfc) depending on the isotherm used, −3 °C (27 °F) or 0 °C (32 °F), similar to the rest of coastal Iceland.Despite its extreme north Atlantic location, Vopnafjörður is much warmer than most locations at a similar latitude. Temperatures very rarely drop below −10 °C (14 °F) in the winter. This is because the Icelandic coastal weather in winter is moderated by the warm waters of the Gulf Stream. Summers are cool, with temperatures sometimes reaching 20 °C (68 °F). The climate has significantly warmed in recent years.

Climate data for Vopnafjörður, 1991–2020 normals, extremes 1964–2024 (Note: All statistics from August 1994 onward are for Skjaldþingsstaðir, 5.5 km (3.4 mi) from Vopnafjörður, where current meteorological observation for the town are made. The averages do not include the period between November 1993 and July 1994 due to lack of data.)
Month	Jan	Feb	Mar	Apr	May	Jun	Jul	Aug	Sep	Oct	Nov	Dec	Year
Record high °C (°F)	16.9 (62.4)	16.4 (61.5)	18.2 (64.8)	20.6 (69.1)	25.6 (78.1)	28.6 (83.5)	28.2 (82.8)	26.2 (79.2)	25.3 (77.5)	21.2 (70.2)	20.6 (69.1)	18.2 (64.8)	28.6 (83.5)
Mean daily maximum °C (°F)	3.4 (38.1)	3.1 (37.6)	3.5 (38.3)	5.8 (42.4)	8.7 (47.7)	12.2 (54.0)	13.9 (57.0)	13.9 (57.0)	11.7 (53.1)	6.8 (44.2)	4.3 (39.7)	3.2 (37.8)	7.5 (45.6)
Daily mean °C (°F)	0.0 (32.0)	−0.5 (31.1)	−0.3 (31.5)	1.7 (35.1)	4.8 (40.6)	8.2 (46.8)	10.1 (50.2)	10.1 (50.2)	7.5 (45.5)	3.6 (38.5)	1.0 (33.8)	−0.1 (31.8)	3.8 (38.9)
Mean daily minimum °C (°F)	−3.5 (25.7)	−3.8 (25.2)	−3.3 (26.1)	−1.4 (29.5)	1.4 (34.5)	4.8 (40.6)	6.9 (44.4)	6.7 (44.1)	4.6 (40.3)	0.9 (33.6)	−2.3 (27.9)	−3.7 (25.3)	0.6 (33.1)
Record low °C (°F)	−21.2 (−6.2)	−16.4 (2.5)	−19.6 (−3.3)	−14.1 (6.6)	−8.3 (17.1)	−2.6 (27.3)	0.2 (32.4)	−1.6 (29.1)	−6.6 (20.1)	−11.6 (11.1)	−16.0 (3.2)	−18.2 (−0.8)	−21.2 (−6.2)
Average precipitation mm (inches)	118.6 (4.67)	79.8 (3.14)	82.1 (3.23)	67.8 (2.67)	78.1 (3.07)	73.1 (2.88)	86.7 (3.41)	101.3 (3.99)	103.9 (4.09)	154.1 (6.07)	132.9 (5.23)	122.5 (4.82)	1,200.9 (47.28)
Source: Icelandic Met Office

== Administration ==
The local government is the municipality of Vopnafjarðarhreppur [ˈvɔhpnaˌfjarðar̥ˌr̥ɛhpʏr̥], which is governed by the municipal council. The council has seven members who are elected in direct elections by the residents of Vopnafjörður for four-year terms. Anyone who is 18 years or older and has his or her legal domicile registered in Vopnafjörður has the right to participate in the local elections. The last municipal elections were held in May 2010.

== Demographics ==
On 1 January 2011, the population of Vopnafjörður was 668, of whom 529 lived in the village, and 139 in the rural part of the municipality. 350 were males and 318 females. 146 were under 18 years of age.

In 2010, the total population was 683, of whom 666 people held Icelandic citizenship. 17 were citizens of other countries, and did not hold dual Icelandic citizenship. Four of those were Danish citizens, one Finnish, three German, one Latvian, one Mexican, one Dutch, one Swiss, three Thai, one British, and one US.

The total population of Vopnafjörður was 987 in 1901, 677 in 1950, 908 in 1990, and 789 in 2000.

== Sports ==
Einherji is Vopnafjörður's sports team. Soccer is the most popular sport, followed by Volleyball.

== Main sights ==
- Bustarfell, folk museum
- Gljúfursárfoss, waterfall on Vopnafjörður's southern coast.
- Highland farms, the setting that inspired Nobel Prize-winning author Halldór Laxness' novel Independent People.
- Ljótsstaðir, childhood home of Gunnar Gunnarsson.
- Múlastofa, a museum about the lives and art of Vopnafjörður-born musicians and playwrights Jón Múli Árnason and Jónas Árnason.

== People from Vopnafjörður ==
- Jón Múli Árnason, musician, playwright and radio host
- Jónas Árnason, playwright and lyricist
- Björgvin Guðmundsson, composer
- Gunnar Gunnarsson, writer
- Pálmi Gunnarsson, pop singer
- Linda Pétursdóttir, businesswoman, Miss Iceland World 1988 and Miss World 1988
- Sigurður Þórarinsson geologist and lyricist
- Pall Thordarson (born 1971), Director of Research in the School of Chemistry, University of New South Wales
- Sigvaldi Thordarson, architect
- Konráð S. Guðjónsson, economist
