= Vápnfirðinga saga =

Saga of Icelanders

Vápnfirðinga saga or Vopnfirðinga saga, named after Vopnafjörður, Iceland, is one of the sagas of Icelanders. It tells the story of Helgi Þorgilsson, a relative of Erik the Red, his murder and subsequent retaliation. The saga provides a window into how a feud might develop between Icelandic chieftains and demonstrates how a dispute could persist over several generations. The saga points at the futility of feud and promotes alternative, more positive forms of conflict resolution.

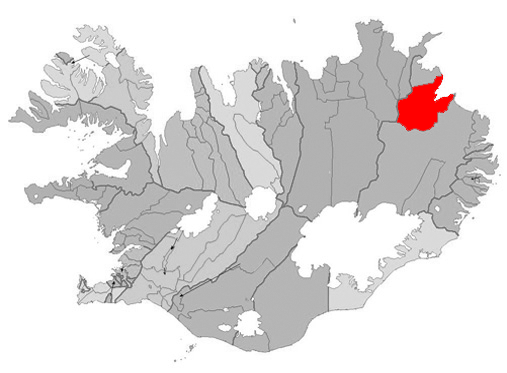
Map of Iceland, Vopnafjord Highlighted

== Synopsis ==
A Note from the Tucker Translation: "The Saga of the People of Vopnafjord is translated from Islendinga sogur. The text is very badly preserved; apart from one vellum leaf, only late paper manuscripts exist, all clearly derived from the same damaged manuscript and sharing the same lacunae, which correspond roughly to two pages of vellum. The resulting gap detracts considerably from the overall effect of the saga, its deft characterisations and dramatic chain of events." The one vellum leaf partially fills the lacunae in the paper manuscripts.

Chapters 1-9

The saga begins by introducing the protagonist, Helgi Þorgilsson (Brodd-Helgi), and describes him as a headstrong, vigilant, and unpredictable. As a youth, Helgi took pity on a bull who was unable to defend himself against the other animals. So, he fixed a spur upon the bulls head, giving it an advantage. It is from this story that Helgi earned the moniker Brodd-Helgi or Spur-Helgi.

When Helgi reaches the age of twelve, he prosecutes a man named Svart, winning conviction and outlawry against Svart. When Svart's subsequent robberies become too much Helgi confronts Svart. He protects himself with a chest-piece made of flagstone and meets Svart in armed combat. Helgi maims Svart who responds by pronouncing a curse upon Helgi and his family, saying that "…Your family will be plagued by such sorrow henceforth that it will be remembered for all ages while the land is inhabited".

Now a wealthy chieftain, Helgi becomes inseparable friends with Geitir Lytingsson of Krossavik, another chieftain, and marries his sister Halla. As a show of goodwill, Geitir fosters Helgi's son, Bjarni.

A ship from arrives bearing Thorleif the Christian and a man named Hrafn, both of whom are supposed to be very wealthy. Helgi offers to host the Hrafn as a guest but is rebuffed because the traders have heard that he is a greedy and arrogant man. Thorleif the Christian has his own farm two days travel to the east. Hrafn then also rejects Helgi's proposition to trade, claiming that Helgi is not of adequate means. Understandably, Helgi becomes angered with the two men. Subsequently, the Norwegian is given room and board by Geitir.

Soon after, it comes to light that Hrafn the Norwegian has been slain. The question of what to do with his riches is discussed between Helgi and Geitir and the two decide to lock up the goods in Geitir's barn until the Spring Assembly where the goods can be legally redistributed. Thorleif the Christian comes and seizes the property, claiming that the goods should be distributed amongst Hrafn's heirs abroad.

It is at this point that the relationship between Helgi and Geitir begins to devolve into enmity. Helgi and Geitir both suspect each other of keeping one of the treasures of Hrafn from the other leading to general mistrust between them. Now that Thorleif the Christian has returned, Helgi is determined to exact revenge on him and so, befriends a man named Ketil whom he tasks with claiming an outstanding temple-tax from Thorleif. Thorleif refuses to pay. When bad travel conditions bring Ketil back to Thorleif's home Thorleif houses him in great hospitality. Ketil chooses to drop the legal complaint against Thorleif. Helgi finds out about this and disowns Ketil as a friend for not following through with his wishes.

Helgi's wife Halla, the sister of Geitir falls ill. Helgi betroths a woman Thorgerd Silver who lives the next valley to the southeast and brings her home while Halla is still alive. Halla sends to her brother Geitir, and leaves to spend her remaining days at Geitir's home. She disowns Helgi when he comes to visit before she dies. Helgi then refuses to return Halla's share of property to Geitir. Feeling betrayed by Helgi, Geitir brings suit against Helgi at the Althing for Halla's share of the property but is defeated.

Two farmers named Thord and Thormod in Helgi's and Geitir's districts, respectively, are engaged in a dispute over tree-cutting and grazing rights. Helgi decides to slaughter all of the cattle belonging to Thormod and cut down the entire forest. Thormod complains to Geitir and Geitir advises summoning Helgi to the thing, a lawsuit. Helgi gets word of this and ambushes Thormod's party. Several of Geitir's thingmen are killed including Thormod.

Geitir sends an envoy of thingmen to Hof to collect the bodies of the slain thingmen. Suspecting that Helgi will be uncooperative, he instructs his thingmen to disguise themselves as charcoal-makers and to carry the bodies away in their charcoal bins. All the while, Helgi and Geitir and their men meet and inform each other that the feud may end if the "lesser man yields to the stronger"'; all this to distract Helgi from what the charcoal men are doing behind him.

Halla is on her deathbed and summons Helgi to visit at Krossavik. Halla's final words to Helgi are, "I do not imagine that many men would finish with their wives as you will do to me."

Chapters 10-19

An accomplished trader named Thorarin arrives in Vopnafjord and Geitir convinces him to come to Krossavik. Helgi hears this and offers Thorarin 5 stud horses in exchange for his friendship but he returns them at Geitir's request. After a few months on the farm, Thorarin speaks for the thingmen and gives Geitir an ultimatum. He says that either Geitir does something about Brodd-Helgi or the thingmen will leave. Geitir takes this to heart and meets with Gudmund the Powerful and Olvir the wise, presumably to plot an attack on Geitir.

As Brodd-Helgi prepares to leave for the Althing the following spring, his foster mother has a prophetic dream. She dreams a white ox (Brodd-Helgi) arose at Hof and was killed at the entrance of Sunnudal valley by a red-flecked ox (Geitir). Then a red ox (Brodd-Helgi's son Bjarni) arose at Hof and killed the red-flecked ox. Next a bull the color of "sea-cattle" (Geitir's son, Thorkel) arose at Krossavik and sought the red ox. Brodd-Helgi correctly interprets this as prophesizing his death at the hands of Geitir but believes the red ox, which avenges him, will be his first son Lyting, when in actuality it turns out to be his younger son Bjarni.

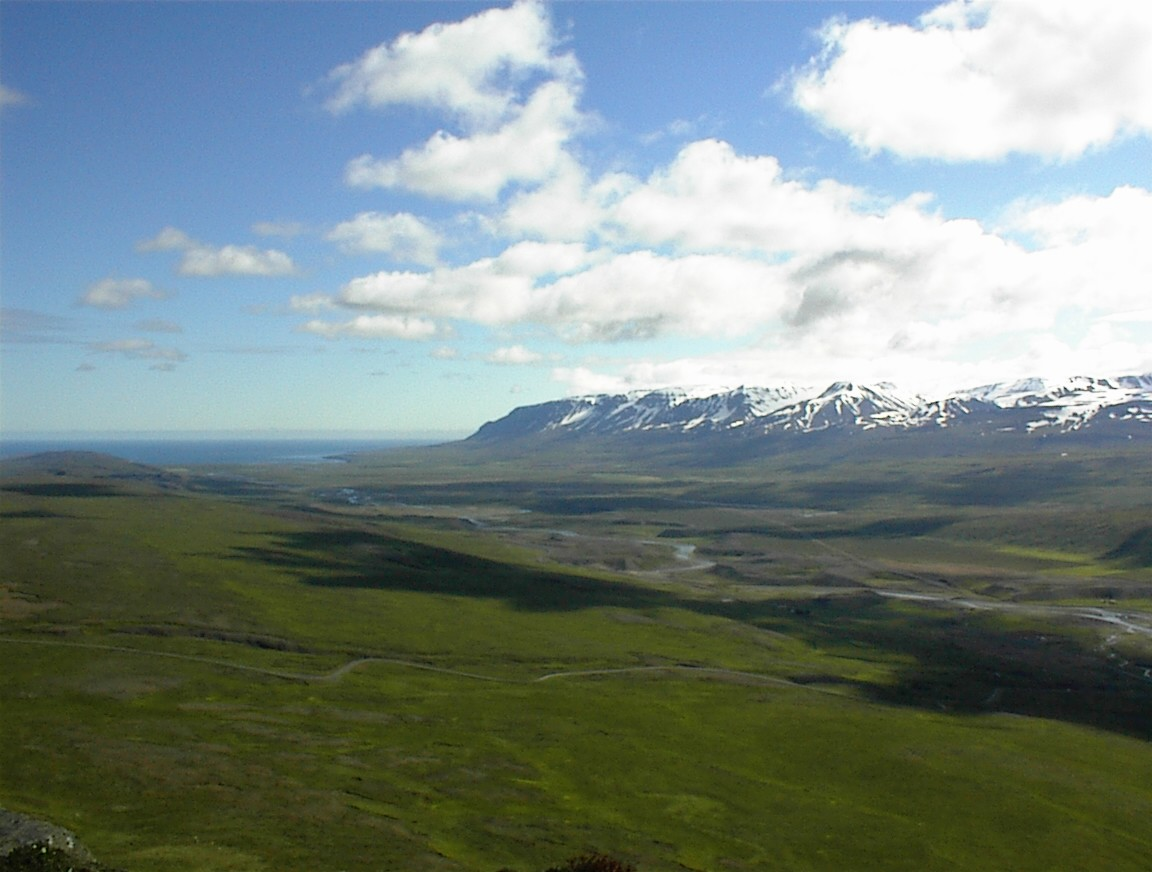
Sunnudal Valley

At this point in the saga the manuscript becomes difficult to read and there is a gap in the story. We can gather than Brodd-Helgi is killed as was prophesied. The resulting lawsuit was adjudicated at the Althing and that dispute seems settled. Bjarni, an adult, is incited by Helgi's widow Thorgerd Siver against Geitir. Bjarni and Geitir went to an annual community meeting at Thorbrand's farmstead. When Bjarni arrived Geitir remarked that he looked angry. During conversation later Bjarni struck Geitir in the head and kills him, an act which he immediately regrets. No compensation is fixed at this time from Bjarni and he returns home to Hof and drives Thorgerd out. Thorkel, Geitir's son, is not in Iceland at the time of Geitir's death but upon his return, denies Bjarni's attempt to compensate for him for the killing.

The next four chapters describe various incidents in which Thorkel attempts to attack and kill Bjarni. Bjarni is able to avoid confrontation with the help of informants and manages to escape an ambush by creating a decoy of himself using a wood chopping block. While traveling from the spring assembly in the Fljotstal district two springs after Geitr's death, Thorkel manages to confront Bjarni and his men at a hay field on farm called Eyvindastadir. The two groups fight until the farm's owner, Eyvind, comes out and throws clothes over their weapons. By this point each side had lost four men and Thorkel's arm has been wounded. The two sides depart in peace and return to their respective farms. A few days later Bjarni sends a healer named Thorvard to Krossavik in order to tend Thorkel's wounded arm. Thorkel was grateful for the healing and "spoke words of friendship with [Bjarni]".

The following summer there was a poor hay harvest at Krossavik on account of Thorkel's wounded arm. Bjarni makes Thorkel two offers of assistance. Thorkel is reluctant but his wife Jorunn insists and travels with Thorkel to Hof to discuss the matter. After discussing their disputes they reach a settlement. Thorkel was allowed to self-judge the case and he awarded himself 100 silver pieces for the killing of Geitir, the same as Geitir had paid for the death of Helgi. The two remained at peace and well-regarded for the rest of their lives and Thorkel moved to Hof when he grew old and ran out of money.

== Themes and motifs ==
Dreams and Fate: This saga features a prophetic dream by Brodd-Helgi's foster mother in which she sees the deaths of Brodd-Helgi and Geitir and how the feud will continue between their sons. Dreams such as this are common in the sagas and provide a mythic element to otherwise realistic stories (Lonnroth). Lonnroth argues this mythic element was included to make the sagas more entertaining. Dreams in the sagas often predict the future and events described in the dreams always occur, though often not as the characters believe they will. This speaks to the medieval Icelandic belief that fate was inescapable. This belief perhaps explains why Brodd-Helgi did not avoid the journey to the Althing despite the prophecy he just heard.

Feuds: Feuds are a common occurrence in the sagas and play a key role in Vápnfirðinga. Feuds in medieval Iceland usually began as a retribution homicide over sexual transgression, insult, or physical injury (Firth). This initial homicide was followed by further murders by the victim's kin or allies. These retribution homicides could continue for generations and often did not end with legal settlement but rather with one side giving in to the power of the other. This helps explain why Thorkel was unwilling to accept compensation from Bjarni in order to end the feud. Doing so would have meant submitting to Bjarni's power and acknowledging him as the greater man. (Firth). Scholars disagree over the function of feuds in medieval Icelandic society. Some back William Miller's argument that chieftains engaged in feuds to "repay insult and injury within a framework of reciprocity" (Firth). Others agree with Samson and Sigurdsson's view that chieftains acted proactively in brutal competition with their neighbors.

The Spur: Helgi gains this nickname from affixing a spur to the head of a bull which had proven itself an underdog. The spur is echoed in Helgi's battle with Svart where he utilizes a flagstone breastplate to gain the upper hand. The name Brodd-Helgi represents his characteristic of using every advantage available to him to triumph over his enemies.

Health: The saga is highly concerned with issues of health, from Halla Lýtingssdóttir's rejection by her husband Brodd-Helgi due to a chronic illness, to Þorkell Geitisson's limited eyesight and bouts with disease, and to the character of Þorvarðr the physician that limits the bloodshed and ends up being a vehicle of peacemaking between the warring kinsmen.

== Translations ==
- The Saga of the People of Vopnafjord. translation by John Tucker. In: Viðar Hreinsson (general editor): The Complete Sagas of Icelanders including 49 Tales (Reykjavík: Leifur Eiríksson Publishing, 1997. Volume IV, pp. 313–334) ISBN 9979-9293-4-0
