= Goðdalir =

Town and church site in Skagafjörður, Iceland

- Town
- Interactive map of Goðdalir
- Country: Iceland
- County: Skagafjörður (municipality)
- Region: Vesturdalur

Goðdalir is a town and church site in Vesturdalur valley in Skagafjörður, Iceland. According to the Landnámabók, the name Goðdalir encompassed a much wider area, even including all of Skagafjarðardalur, Vesturdalur, Austurdalur, and Svartárdalur, however, this is not known with certainty. Goðdalir is the lowest town in Vesturdalur west of the river and the area has flat, wide pastures. The mountain that overlooks the town is called Goðdalakista.

The first mention of a priest in Goðdalir in the 11th century. There was a parsonage there until 1904 where many well-known priests served. One such priest was Skúli Magnússon, grandfather and namesake of sheriff Skúli Magnússon, who was very ostentatious. Sources say that when he would travel, he would call out to anyone he met "Out of the way, ladies and gentlemen, here comes the priest of Goðdalir!"

The parsonage operated in Goðdalir until 1907. The current church there was built in 1904 using lumber from the previous church, which was blown away in a violent storm in 1885. The church was moved and retrofitted between 1994 and 1997, and is now a protected building.

In 1976, a gravestone was provided to the grave of the poet Símon Dalaskáld, who died in 1916, in Goðdalir’s cemetery.
