= Hofsá =

River in Iceland

Coordinates: 65°43′30″N 14°50′20″W

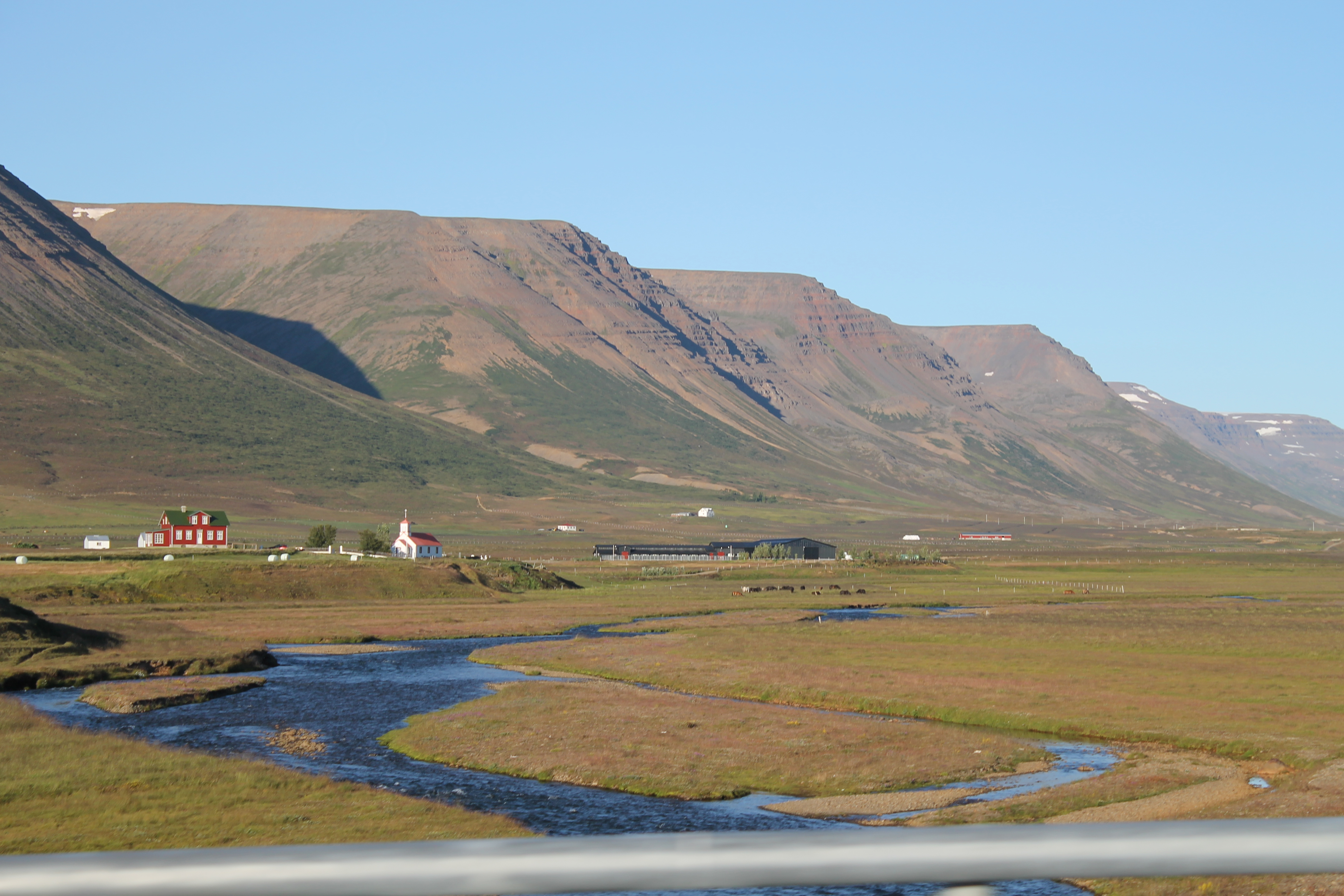
Image of Hofsá river

Hofsá (Icelandic pronunciation: [ˈhɔfsˌauː], "shrine river") is a river in Vopnafjörður in the Northeastern part of Iceland. It is 85 kilometres (53 mi) long and is a productive salmon river.

== Salmon fishing ==
The average annual catch between 1974 and 2013 was 1,119 salmon. The maximum catch during that period was in 1992, when 2,239 salmon were caught. The minimum catch was only 141 salmon in 1980. The average weight is usually between 3.0 and 3.5 kg. The exact number for 2013 was an impressive average of 3.1 kg.

Hofsá has salmon for 30 km up from the river-mouth, and trout for about 6 km. The salmon fishing season in Hofsá starts in early July, and ends in the middle of September.

Charles, Prince of Wales came to fish in Hofsá in his youth. This trip was depicted in the "Gold Stick" episode of in season 4 of The Crown.
