= Guðmundur G. Hagalín =

Icelandic writer

Guðmundur Gíslason Hagalín (Lokinhömrum in Arnarfjörthur, October 10, 1898 – Akranesi, February 26, 1985) was an Icelandic writer who came from the sea-girt Western Fiords of Iceland, where he was a fisherman before attending secondary school. Later, he lectured on Iceland in Norway for a few years (1924–27), and became a superintendent of public libraries. His home was fairly near Reykjavík. His best work concerned portrayals of the simple sturdy seamen and countryfolk of his native region, which are often refreshingly arch in manner. He tended to do this better in short form than long. Hagalín also did well as a narrator able to capture the living speech and characteristic mode of expression of his characters. Strandbúar is one of his collections of short stories. He also had success in recording and editing biographies of very diverse people, based on first-hand accounts of their own lives. In 1960 he was still alive and working on his autobiography.
