= Hofsá (Vesturdalur) =

River in Skagafjörður, Iceland

- Etymology: Icelandic for "temple river"

Location
- Country: Iceland
- Municipality: Skagafjörður (municipality)

Physical characteristics
- Mouth
  - coordinates: 65°15′20.49″N 18°58′50.54″W
- Length: 25 km (16 mi)

Hofsá is a river that runs through Vesturdalur in Skagafjörður, Iceland and joins the Vestari-Jökulsá where it flows out of Hofsdalur valley at Bjarnastaðahlíð, a short distance from the church site Goðadalir.

== Description ==
The river is a spring creek that primarily comes from streams and lakes at the base of Hofsjökull glacier. Although the water is glacier-colored after the Fossá flows into the river, which runs from Hofsjökull, and flows somewhat inward within the area of the abandoned farm Þorljótsstaðir, the river confluence is clear. The name of the mountain slope east of the river is called Runa or Þorljótsstaðaruna, from which the river takes the name Runukvísl fork. There are excellent sites for trout fishing from there and all the way up to Runnfoss.
