= Austari-Jökulsá =

Glacier river in Skagafjörður, Iceland

Coordinates: 65°22′21″N 19°06′21″W

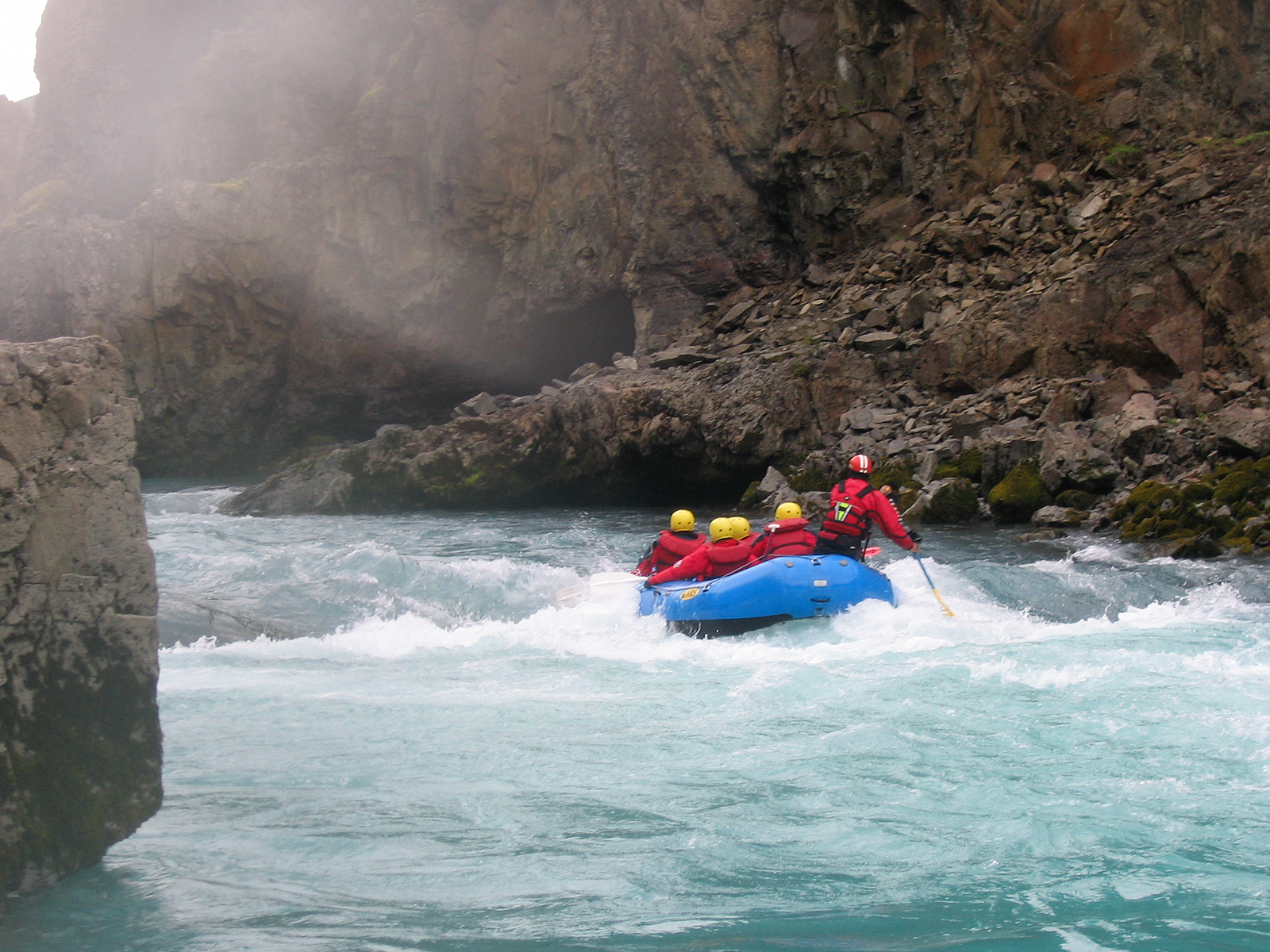
Austari-Jökulsá

Austari-Jökulsá (Icelandic pronunciation: [ˈœysta(ː)rɪ-ˈjœːkʏlsˌauː], "easterly glacier river") is a glacial river in the north of Iceland. After the confluence with Vestari-Jökulsá it forms the Héraðsvötn.

== Name ==
The name means Eastern Glacial River, in comparison to the Western Glacial River (Vestari-Jökulsá) which is situated more to the west.

== Course of the river ==
Some glacial outlet streams of the big ice cap Hofsjökull confluence up in the highland to form the glacial river Austari-Jökulsá. The river discharge is rather important with 60-100 m3/sec in the summer and 20-30 m3/sec in wintertime. A flood went up to 320 m3/sec.

Because of this, the river which has no waterfalls had a bad reputation and was/is very difficult to ford.

In 1970, a bridge was built near Laugafell.

== Sports ==
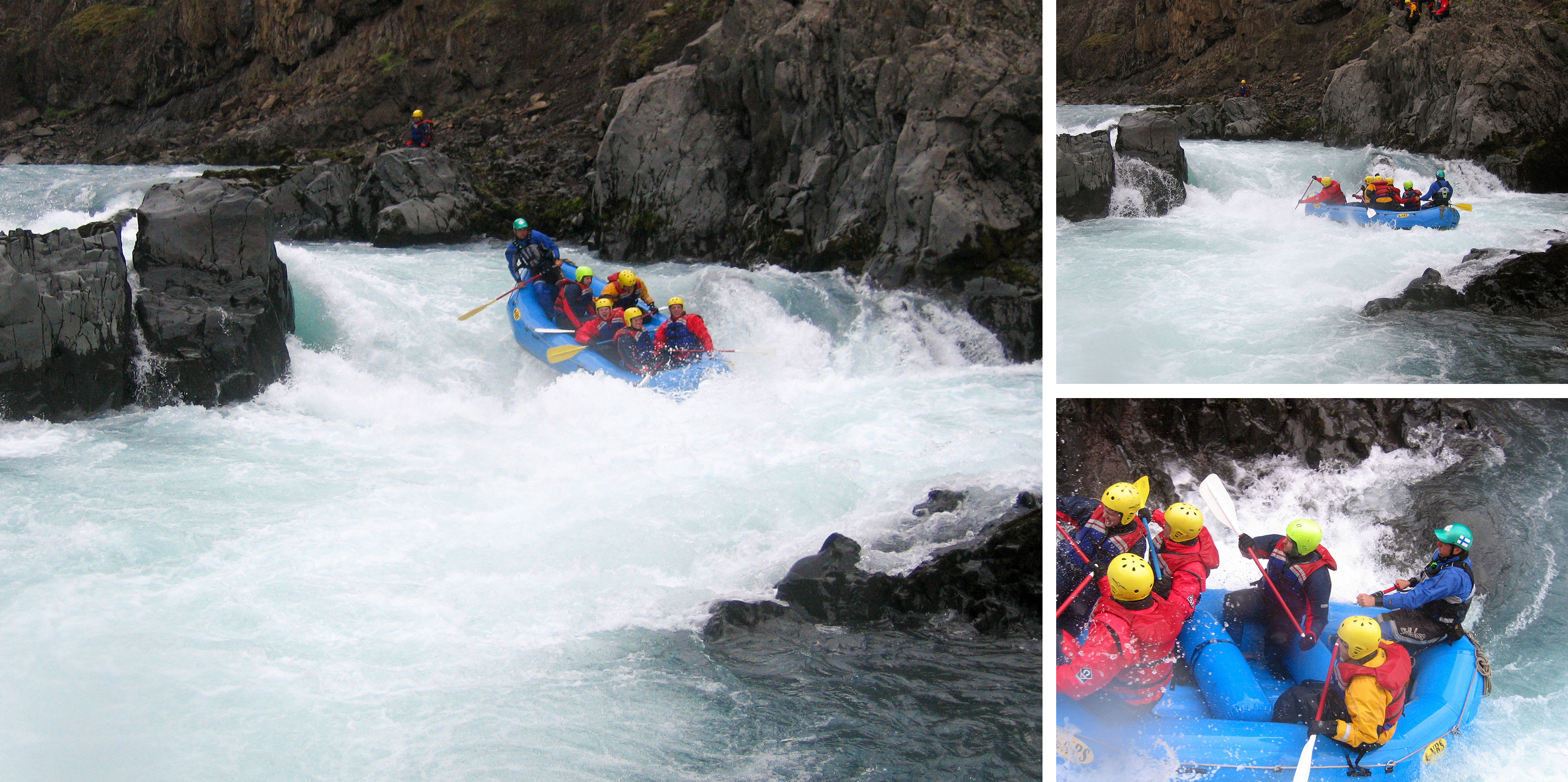
Rafting on Austari-Jökulsá

Today, the river with its fierce currents is popular for rafting tours.
