= Hoff =

Hoff may refer to:

== People ==
- Hoff (surname)
  - Carolyn Ann Hoff (1946-2015), an American philanthropist
  - Christina Hoff Sommers, American author of feminist and sociological studies
  - Rani Hoff, Yale professor of psychiatry
- Von Hoff (surname)
- Benjamin Hoff American author

Nicknamed

- Syd Hoff, cartoonist, known as "Hoff"
- David Hasselhoff, American actor and singer who is sometimes referred to as "The Hoff"
- Noah Hoffman, American Olympic skier, known as "The Hoff"
- Josh Hazlewood, Australian Cricketer, sometimes nicknamed "Hoff"

== Places ==
- Hoff, Cumbria, place in Northern England
- Hoff Township, Minnesota

Structures

- Hoff (station), light rail station on the Oslo Tramway
- Hoff Building (Hotel Boise), an office building in Boise, Idaho, constructed in 1930
- Hoff Church, an 11th-century Norwegian church

== Companies ==
- HOFF Norske Potetindustrier, a Norwegian manufacturer of potato products

== Other ==
- Hoff crab, common name for a species of squa lobster in the genus Kiwa
- Van't Hoff (crater), crater on the Moon
- Van 't Hoff equation
- Van 't Hoff factor, formula used in physical chemistry
- Le Bel-van't Hoff rule

== See also ==
- Drummer Hoff, a children's book
- Jacobus Henricus van 't Hoff (1852-1911) Dutch chemist
- Susanna Hoffs (born 1959) U.S. singer
- Tamar Simon Hoffs (born 1934) U.S. director
- Hof (disambiguation)
- van't Hof
