= Hof =

Hof or HOF may refer to:

== Buildings ==
- Hof Ásatrúarfélagsins, a temple in Reykjavík, Iceland
- Hofburg, the imperial palace in Vienna

== Places ==
=== Austria ===
- Hof, Upper Austria, a settlement in Sankt Marienkirchen am Hausruck
- Hof bei Salzburg, a municipality in the district of Salzburg-Umgebung
- Hof am Leithaberge, a town in the district of Bruck an der Leitha in the state of Lower Austria
- Hof bei Straden, a former municipality in the district of Südoststeiermark in the state of Styria

=== Czech Republic ===
- Hof in Mähren, German name for Dvorce, in the Bruntál District in the Moravian-Silesian Region

=== Germany ===
- Hof (district), a Landkreis (district) in Bavaria
  - Hof, Bavaria, a town in the Hof district of Bavaria
  - Hof (electoral district), comprising the town of Hof and the districts of Hof and Wunsiedel
- Hof, Rhineland-Palatinate, a village in the Westerwaldkreis in Rhineland-Palatinate

=== Iceland ===
- Heathen hof, a type of Old Norse temple
- Hof, Iceland, a small village in the municipality of Sveitarfélagið Hornafjörður
- Hof in Höfðaströnd, a town and church site in Skagafjörður
- Hof í Vesturdal, an abandoned farm and former church site in Skagafjörður

=== Netherlands and Belgium ===
- Hof van Delft, a former municipality west of Delft, South Holland
- Hof van Holland, High Court of the provinces of Holland and Zeeland from 1428–1811
- Hof van Savoye, palace of Margaret of Austria in Mechelen, Antwerp
- Hof van Twente, a municipality in Twente, Overijssel

=== Norway ===
- Heathen hof, a type of Old Norse temple
- Hof Municipality (Hedmark), a former municipality in the old Hedmark county
- Hof, Åsnes, a village in Åsnes municipality in Innlandet county
- Hof Municipality (Vestfold), a former municipality in Vestfold county
- Hof, Vestfold, a village in Holmestrand municipality in Vestfold county
  - Hof Prison, a former prison in Holmestrand municipality in Vestfold county

== Science and mathematics ==
- Higher-order function, in mathematics and computer science
- Horton overland flow, in soil science
- Huisman-Olff-Fresco models, in ecology
- Hypofluorous acid
- Hydrogen-bonded organic framework, in chemistry

== Other uses ==
- Hof (surname), a Dutch and German surname and any of several people
- HOf gauge, 1:87 rail modelling using 6.5 mm track
- Hall of fame
- High on Fire, an American band
- House of Fraser, a British department store
- RPC-TV, formerly HOF-TV, a Panamanian television network

== See also ==
- van 't Hof
- Siege of Hof (1553), during the Second Margrave War
- Battle of Hof (1809), during the Napoleonic Wars
- Hoff (disambiguation)
- Hofgarten (disambiguation)
