= Hoof (surname) =

Hoof is a surname of Dutch or German origin and is a variant of Hoff. It is a topographic surname from North Germany. It is also a Dutch nickname for hoofd meaning head.

- Anne Catherine Hoof Green (c. 1720–1775), née Hoof, printer and publisher in colonial Maryland
- David L. Hoof (born 1945), American novelist
- Jacob Otto Hoof (1768–1839), Swedish Lutheran pastor and Christian revivalist preacher
- William Hoof (c.1788–1855), British civil engineer

== See also ==
- Van Hoof, another surname
- Black Hoof (c. 1740–1831), head civil chief of the Shawnee Indians in the Ohio Country
