= Marney A. White =

American psychologist and epidemiologist

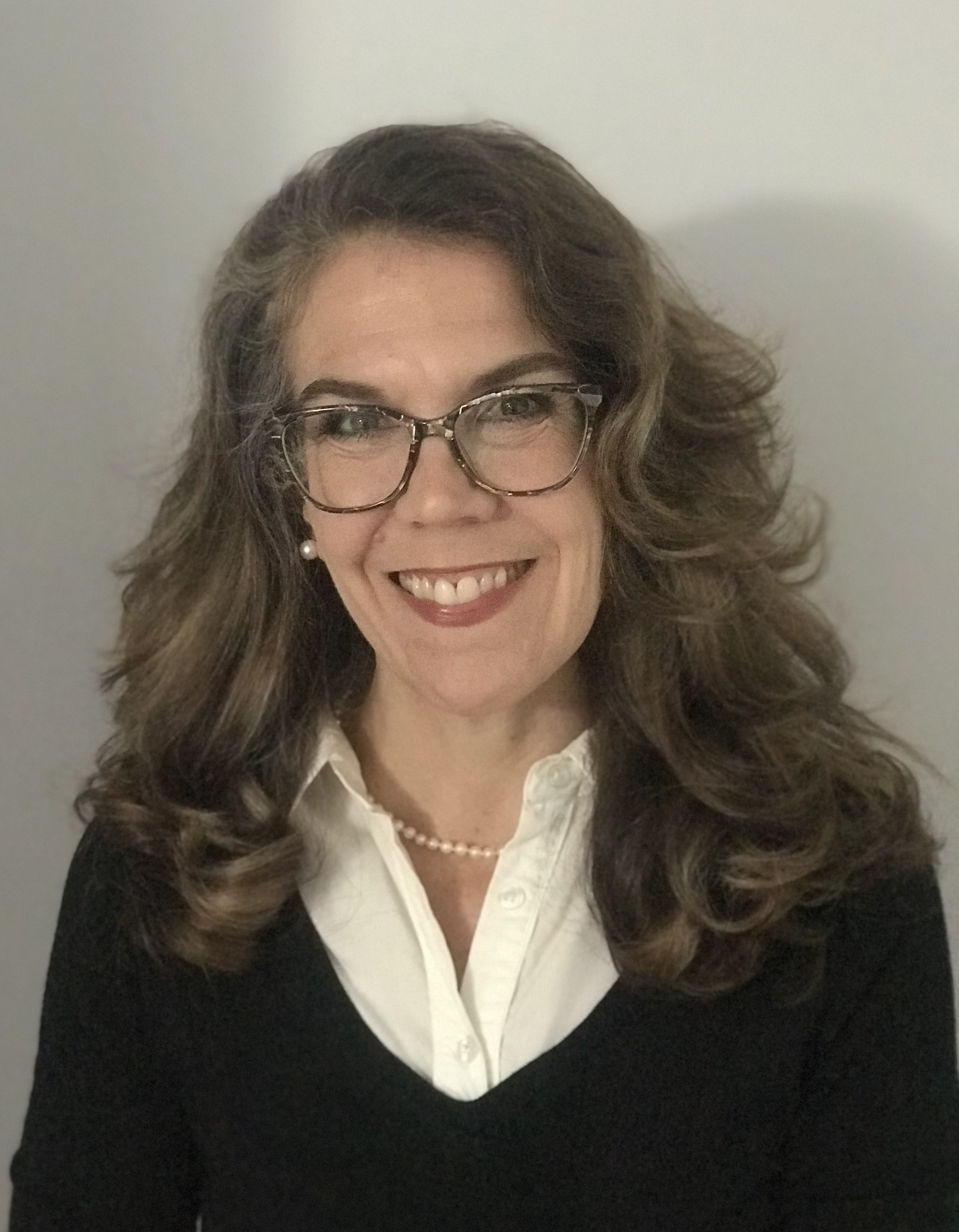
- Born: Virginia, USA
- Spouse: Erik Mayville
- Children: 3

Academic background
- Education: BS, 1991, University of Virginia; MA, 1998, James Madison University; PhD, 2003, Louisiana State University; MS, 2009, Yale School of Public Health, Chronic Disease Epidemiology
- Thesis: Mediators of weight loss in an internet-based intervention for African American adolescent girls (2003)

Academic work
- Institutions: Yale University
- Main interests: Eating disorders, binge eating, mental health, campus mental health

Marney Ann White is an American psychologist and epidemiologist.

== Early life and education ==
White completed her Bachelor of Science degree in 1991 from the University of Virginia and her Master's degree at James Madison University. She obtained her doctoral degree at Louisiana State University and published Development and validation of the food-craving inventory. Following her clinical internship, she completed a postdoctoral fellowship in the Department of Psychiatry at the Yale School of Medicine. She then joined the faculty at the Yale School of Medicine and simultaneously completed a second master's degree at Yale School of Public Health in Chronic Disease Epidemiology.

== Career ==
Upon completing her postdoctoral fellowship, White joined the faculty at the Yale University School of Medicine as an assistant professor. During the 2013–14 academic year, White was promoted to the rank of associate professor and was selected as Teacher of the Year by Yale School of Public Health Class of 2014 and 2020. She was promoted to the rank of professor in 2021.

As an associate professor, White co-authored Stress, cortisol, and other appetite‐related hormones: Prospective prediction of 6‐month changes in food cravings and weight. She was also the first author on Evaluation of a Behavioral Self-Care Intervention for Public Health Students which examined the effectiveness of a behavioral health promotion intervention on health behaviors of postgraduate students.

During the COVID-19 pandemic, White integrated COVID-19 into her undergraduate course: Introduction to Epidemiology and Public Health. She created a case study in which she asked students to compare COVID-19 to SARS and walked them through basic epidemiological procedures. She also created a socially distanced learning course on self-care for the public to cope with the anxiety of COVID-19. White has also published various op-eds on COVID anxiety, mental health, and returning to work and authored COVID-19: When Teaching Public Health Became Personal. In 2021, White was ranked the world's third top expert in binge-eating disorder by Expertscape's PubMed-based algorithms, alongside colleagues Carlos Grilo, Robin Masheb, Marc Potenza, Janet Lydecker, and Valentina Ivezaj.

White's research on behavioral health has spanned multiple areas, from conducting randomized controlled trials for eating disorders and smoking cessation to epidemiological and psychometric studies. Her work also examines psychiatric comorbidities and psychological consequences of chronic disease. Her transdisciplinary work examines psychiatric correlates of severe autoimmune skin diseases and other dermatologic conditions. She currently serves on the Autoimmune Blistering Disease Task Force of the European Association of Dermatology and Venereology and as a statistical and academic consultant for the International Pemphigus and Pemphigoid Foundation.

== Awards and honors ==
White has won multiple awards for her undergraduate and graduate teaching, including Yale School of Public Health's Teacher of the Year award in 2014 and in 2020. She has been lauded for her teaching style; Yale School of Public Health's announcement read, “Her classes, described as interactive, fun, and riddled with story-telling, provided students the opportunity to successfully apply the knowledge they learned to address public health challenges.” White has authored a research publication on the impact of incorporating humor into pedagogy.

== Personal life ==
White and her husband Erik Mayville have one son together and two stepdaughters. She is the daughter of Louise White, a public school science teacher and Bob White, founder of surfboard brand Wave Riding Vehicles and inaugural inductee in the East Coast Surfing Hall of Fame.

In 2016, White generated backlash for her opinion piece about balancing motherhood and academia; specifically, for the composition of a photograph of her with her infant son featured in the Washington Post. White wrote a response piece about bullying in the academic community.

== Health Advocacy ==
Since 2017, White has been an active member of the philanthropic initiative MOMbies Dance to Donate, a collective of mothers who perform dance routines to raise funds for metastatic breast cancer research through the Cancer Couch Foundation.

White gained prominence as an advocate for people with immunocompromised systems during the COVID-19 pandemic.
