= Van Hoof =

Van Hoof is a Dutch toponymic surname. Hoof (modern Dutch hof and hoef, "homestead") may refer to any number of places with the -hof, -hoof, or -hove endings, including the town Hove in Antwerp province, near which the surname is particularly common. It could also be derived from names with a particle, like Van 't Hof ("from the homestead"). Variants include Van Hooff and Vanhoof. Notable people with the surname include:

- Chris Van Hoof, professor of engineering
- Eddie Van Hoof (born 1956), British gymnast
- Elke Vanhoof (born 1992), Belgian BMX bicyclist
- Els Van Hoof (born 1969), Belgian politician
- Frederique van Hoof (born 2001), Dutch Paralympic table tennis player
- Harry van Hoof (1943-2024), Dutch composer, conductor and music arranger
- Henk van Hoof (born 1947), Dutch politician
- Jan van Hoof (1922–1944), Dutch Resistance member
- Jef van Hoof (1886–1959), Belgian composer and conductor
- José van Hoof (born 1952), Dutch footballer
- Lieve Van Hoof, Belgian classical scholar
- Mary Ann Van Hoof (1909–1984), American Marian visionary
- Roger van Hoof (born 1947), Belgian Surgeon General

Van Hooff

- Anton van Hooff (born 1943), Dutch historian of antiquity
- Jan van Hooff (1755–1816), Dutch Patriot politician and statesman
- Jan van Hooff (born 1936), Dutch primatologist
- Renée Van Hoof-Haferkamp (1928–2025), Director-General of the European Commission's interpretation service

== See also ==
- Van 't Hof
- Van Hove
