= Malcolm Woodward =

British Modernist Sculptor (1943–2014)

Malcolm Woodward (1943 - 2014) was a British sculptor in the modernist tradition, a published author and an assistant to sculptor Henry Moore from 1972 until Moore's death in 1986.

== Early life and background ==
Woodward was born in 1943 in Skellow, south Yorkshire, a village five miles north west of Doncaster, strongly associated with the coal mining industry. He attended the local grammar school and was particularly interested in maths and art. Woodward initially went to Doncaster College of Art in 1961 before moving to Leicester College of Art where he met his future wife, animation artist Susan Woodward (née Lakin), in 1963. He then moved to London to study sculpture and bronze casting under Professor Bernard Meadows at the Royal College of Art, graduating in 1967.

== Career ==
Woodward worked primarily in the modernistic idiom, using clay or plaster to create studies and working models that would later be cast as editions in bronze. He also carved individual pieces using alabaster, marble and wood. In later phases of his artistic career he explored primitive and pagan iconography using mixed media and found materials, naturally weathering and corroding them, to create a series of one-off pieces that held particular significance for him. He was also accomplished at drawing and photography.

An interest in Catholicism from childhood was often reflected directly and indirectly in his sculptures, particularly his bronzes. He was commissioned to create Stations of the Cross in 1983 by Coventry Cathedral for display in its new visitor centre. This was a groundbreaking work of its time as each bronze artwork depicting a corresponding station featured an accompanying holographic image that hung in the centre.

Woodward held several individual exhibitions of his sculptural work and drawings and also exhibited in group shows alongside other artists; his sculptures appear in collections worldwide. He successfully entered works in the Royal Academy Summer Exhibition on several occasions.

Henry Moore

Woodward became assistant to Henry Moore in late 1972 and worked long-term with two other assistants, Michel Muller and John Farnham, at Moore's Perry Green studios to realise large-scale bronzes of the artist's sculptural work during this period. These pieces were typically scaled up from Moore's original maquette studies and enlarged then finessed, often in plaster or polystyrene working models, before being cast in bronze. Aspects of this process were captured by various photographers, including Gemma Levine, who documented this in three different published books on Moore

After Moore's death in 1986, Woodward became conservator for the recently established Henry Moore Foundation – looking after conservation of Moore's sculptures in both the UK, including dedicated locations such as the Yorkshire Sculpture Park, and across public and private collections worldwide. Alongside his work as conservator, Woodward also helped to site sculpture at various Moore exhibitions, oversaw outreach for the Foundation's fellowship programme and represented it as a governor at Wimbledon College of Art.

Books

In 2011, Woodward published a book Henry Moore: Plasters with Anita Feldman, then head of collections and exhibitions at the Henry Moore Foundation, in which he contributed a chapter of his own writing, entitled: ‘Thoughts and observations on assisting Henry Moore’.
