= Two-Piece Reclining Figure: Points =

Sculpture series by Henry Moore

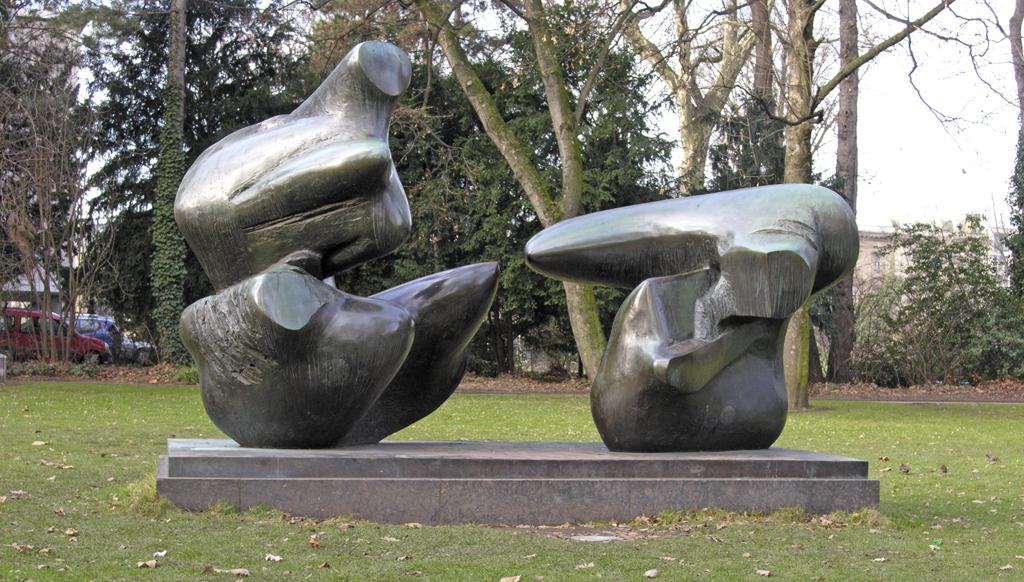
- Two-Piece Reclining Figure: Points; Düsseldorf Hofgarten, Germany
- Artist: Henry Moore
- Year: 1969–70
- Catalogue: LH 606
- Type: Bronze
- Dimensions: 365 cm (144 in)

Two-Piece Reclining Figure: Points is a bronze sculpture by Henry Moore, catalogued as LH 606, and created in 1969–70.

== Editions ==
It was a bronze edition of 7; the artist's copy ("0/7") is in Kew Gardens in London, loaned by the Henry Moore Foundation another in the Hofgarten, Düsseldorf (illustrated), and one at the Hirshhorn Museum and Sculpture Garden in Washington D.C. The plaster model is at the Art Gallery of Ontario. In 2008, an example traveled to the New York Botanical Garden, and the Denver Botanic Gardens.

== History ==
Among Moore's post war abstract bronzes, it is a part of the Two Piece Reclining Figure series. It can be read as one figure or two.

I did the first one in two pieces almost without intending to. But after I had done it, then the second one became a conscious idea. I realised what an advantage a separated two- piece composition could have in relating figures to landscape. Knees and breasts are mountains. Once these two parts become separated you don't expect it to be a naturalistic figure; therefore you can justifiably make it look like a landscape or a rock. If it's a single figure, you can guess what it's going to be like. If it's in two pieces there's a bigger surprise, you have more unexpected views; therefore the special advantage over painting—of having the possibility of many different views—is more fully explored. The front view doesn't enable you to foresee the back view. As you move round it, the two parts overlap or they open up and there's space in between.

== Reviews ==
Gift of Joseph Hirshhorn, 1974

A work like Two Piece Reclining Figure: Points, from 1969, has the feel that Moore aimed at — but didn't always achieve — of form as primal matter.

== See also ==
- List of sculptures by Henry Moore
- List of public art in Washington, D.C., Ward 2
- Two-Piece Reclining Figure No. 9
- Reclining Figure 1969–70
