= Jeanne Hoff =

Jeanne Hoff may refer to:

- Jeanne Ruark Hoff (born 1960), American college basketball player
- Jeanne Hoff (psychiatrist) (1938–2023), American psychiatrist
