= Robin Masheb =

American psychologist

- Born: Paramus, New Jersey
- Spouse: Joel Ira Rudikoff (m. 2002)

Academic background
- Education: BS, 1998, Tufts University; PhD, 1997, St. John's University
- Thesis: Psychosocial functioning in women with vulvodynia (1997)

Academic work
- Institutions: Yale University

Robin Meryl Masheb is an American psychologist. She is a Full Professor of Psychiatry at Yale University and Director of the Veterans Initiative for Eating and Weight (The VIEW). The program is dedicated to addressing eating and weight problems in veterans through research, training and advocacy.

== Early life and education ==
Masheb was born to mother Evelyn, former public school staff development director for reading in the early-childhood grades, and father Clifford M. Masheb, a retired certified public accountant in Paramus, New Jersey. Masheb completed her Bachelor of Science degree from Tufts University and her PhD from St. John's University in 1997. Following her doctoral training, she interned at Brown University and then arrived at Yale University for her Postdoctoral Fellowship].

== Career ==
Upon completing her formal education, Masheb joined the faculty at Yale University as an assistant professor of psychiatry. While serving in this role, she collaborated with Carlos Grilo and Tamara Jackson to study how teasing people about their general appearance could play a role in binge eating disorder. To reach this conclusion, the researchers asked each of the women about teasing they had been subjected to before the age of 18, eating and weight problems, concerns about weight and shape, body dissatisfaction, depression and self-esteem. She was later the lead investigator of a study funded by the National Institute of Child Health and Human Development to research vulvodynia.

Masheb founded the Veterans Initiative for Eating and Weight (The View) in 2013 as a program dedicated to addressing eating and weight problems in veterans through research, training and advocacy. In 2019, Masheb found that the military practice of “making weight” is related to binge eating and eating pathology later in life. Prior to and during the COVID-19 pandemic, Masheb and her research team screened 126 veterans who were referred to an orientation session for a national program called MOVE! for their response to physical pain. They found that 40 percent of veterans screened by Yale researchers overate in response to physical pain at least once in the 30 days prior to being surveyed.

In 2021, Masheb was ranked a top expert in binge-eating disorder by Expertscape's PubMed-based algorithms, alongside colleagues Carlos Grilo, Marney A. White, Marc Potenza, Janet Lydecker, and Valentina Ivezaj. She also began investigated eating disorders in over 1,110 Iraq and Afghanistan war-era veterans through a survey. Her research team found that 14 percent of women and 5 percent of men met the criteria for probable atypical anorexia nervosa.

== Personal life ==
Masheb is married to lawyer Joel Ira Rudikoff, with whom she has two sons.
