= Reclining Figure 1969–70 =

Sculpture series by Henry Moore

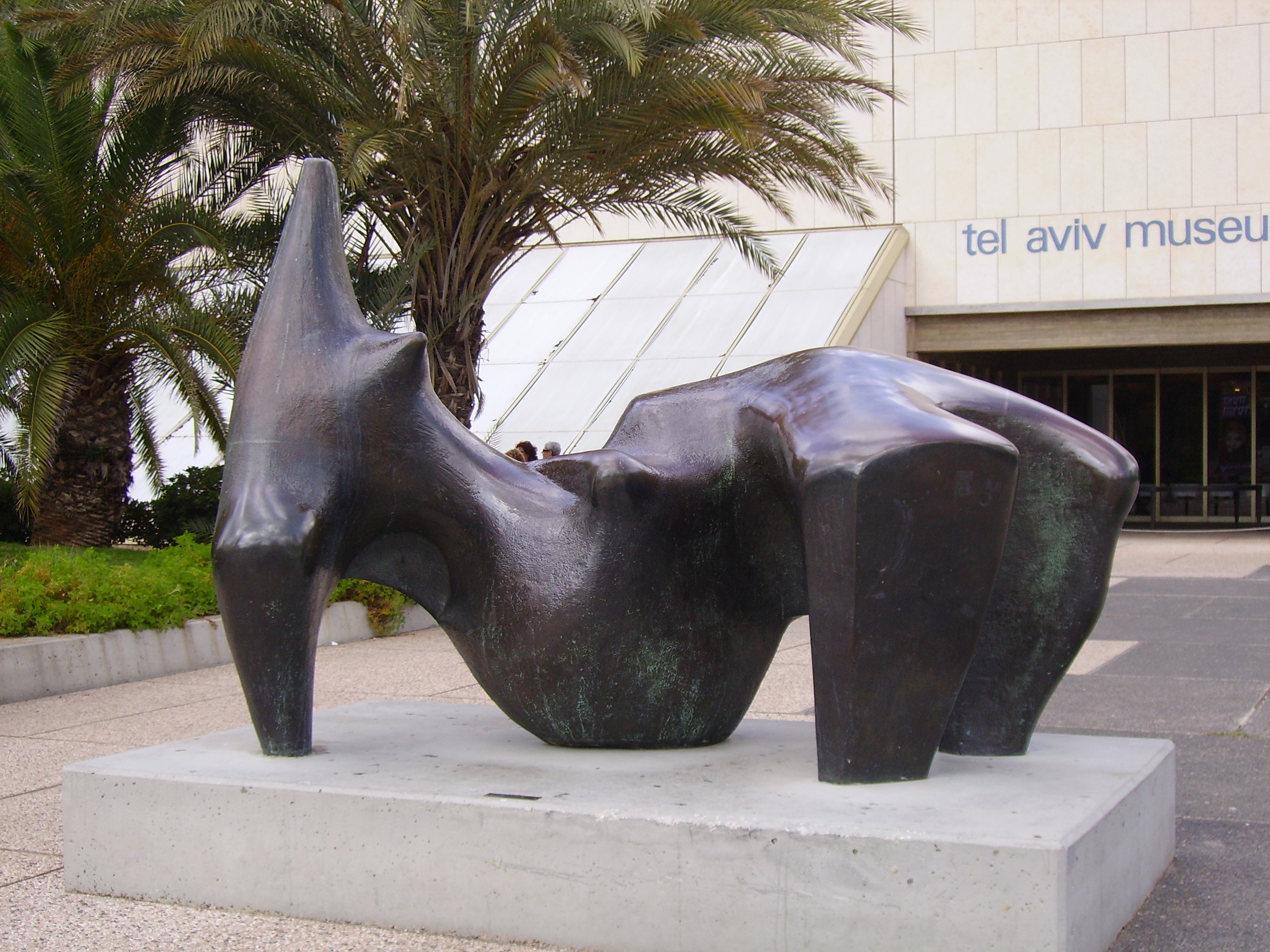
- in the Lola Beer Ebner Sculpture Garden at the entrance of the Tel Aviv Museum of Art.
- Artist: Henry Moore
- Year: 1969
- Catalogue: LH 608
- Type: Bronze
- Dimensions: 343 cm (135 in)

Reclining Figure 1969–70 (LH 608) is a bronze sculpture by English artist Henry Moore.

== History ==
Inspired by the shape of a piece of flint, Moore created a maquette for the sculpture in plaster which was cast in an edition of small bronzes, some 15 centimetres (6 inches) long. The maquette was used to create a full-size version in polystyrene, which was used to create a mould for a monumental sculpture.

The sculpture can be viewed as an abstraction of a reclining female human figure, resting on one arm, hip and two legs, with the second arm raised, and a prominence on the chest suggesting a breast. It has no evident face.

Six full-size copies were cast in 1969 and early 1970, at the Noack factory in Berlin, and an artist's copy was cast shortly before Moore's death in 1986. The sculpture measures 3 × 3.6 × 2 metres (10 × 12 × 6 1/2 ft) and weighs around 2 tonnes (2.2 short tons). One cast was exhibited in a major retrospective of his work at the Forte di Belvedere in Florence in 1972, later described by Moore as the pinnacle of his career.

The artist's cast (0/6) was stolen from the Henry Moore Foundation at Perry Green, Hertfordshire on 15 December 2005. It is believed to have been hoisted onto the back of a stolen flatbed Mercedes lorry using a crane, cut up for scrap the same night, and shipped to Rotterdam, and then probably to the Far East. The sculpture was estimated to be worth £3M, but only £1,500 as scrap. The theft inspired German artist Fritz Balthaus in 2009 to cast bronze ingots of equivalent weight which, arranged in a form approximating Moore's sculpture, are displayed as Pure Moore at the Federal Criminal Police Office in Berlin.

== See also ==
- List of sculptures by Henry Moore
- List of heists in the United Kingdom
- Two-Piece Reclining Figure No. 9
- Two-Piece Reclining Figure: Points
