= Hof (surname) =

Hof is a Dutch and German toponymic surname. Notable people with the surname include:

- Anne Catherine Hof Blinks (1903–1995), American botanist
- Bennie Hofs (1946–2017), Dutch footballer
- Dennis Hof (1946–2018), American brothel owner in Nevada
- Erich Hof (1936–1995), Austrian footballer and coach
- Heinz Hof (born 1944), pseudonym of Werner Janssen, Dutch/German philosopher and poet
- Jennifer Hof (born 1991), German fashion model
- Marjolijn Hof (born 1956), Dutch writer
- Mark-Peter Hof (born 1990), Dutch basketball player
- Norbert Hof (1944–2020), Austrian retired footballer
- Samuel Hof (1870–1937), US Army major general
- Wim Hof (born 1959), Dutch daredevil nicknamed "the Iceman" for his resistance to extreme cold

== See also ==
- Hoff (surname), North German, Dutch, and Danish surname
- Hoffman (disambiguation), German surname
- Van 't Hof, Dutch surname
- Hof (disambiguation)
