= Intergradation =

Connections between subspecies

In zoology, intergradation is the way in which two distinct subspecies are connected via areas where populations are found that have the characteristics of both. There are two types of intergradation: primary and secondary.

== Primary intergradation ==
This occurs in cases where: two subspecies are connected via one or more intermediate populations, each of which is in turn intermediate to its adjacent populations, and also, each exhibits more or less the same amount of variability as any other population within the species.

Adjacent populations and subspecies are subject to cline intergradation. In these situations it is usually taken for granted that the clines are causally related (by natural selection) to environmental gradients.

== Secondary intergradation ==
When contact between a geographically isolated subspecies is reestablished with the main body of the species or with another isolate subspecies, interbreeding takes place as long as the isolate has not yet evolved an effective set of isolating mechanisms. Consequently, a relatively distinct zone or belt of hybridization will develop depending on the degree of genetic and phenotypic difference that was achieved by the previously isolated subspecies.

== See also ==
- Ring species
