= Gradsect =

Sampling method using gradient-directed transects to assess biodiversity

A gradsect or gradient-directed transect is a low-input, high-return sampling method where the aim is to maximise information about the distribution of biota in any area of study. Most living things are rarely distributed at random, their placement being largely determined by a hierarchy of environmental factors. For this reason, standard statistical designs based on purely random sampling or systematic (e.g. grid-based) systems tend to be less efficient in recovering information about the distribution of taxa than sample designs that are purposively directed instead along deterministic environmental gradients.

Ecologists have long been aware of the significance of environmental gradient based approaches to better understand community dynamics and this is reflected especially in the work of Robert Whittaker (1967) and others. Although in practice, life-scientists intuitively sample gradients, until the early 1980s there was little formal theoretical or empirical support for such an approach, sample design being driven largely by traditional statistical methods based on probability theory incorporating random sampling.

== Origins ==
Intensively sampled landscape-based surveys in Australia provided a reference platform for developing and testing a less logistically demanding and yet statistically acceptable gradient-based survey design that avoided the need for random or purely grid-based sampling. These initial studies and subsequently developed statistical support for purposive, gradient-based survey provided a formalized, practical alternative to more logistically demanding traditional designs. It was here the term gradsect was coined that coupled purposive, transect sampling with a hierarchical framework of environmental gradients considered to be key determinants of species distribution.

== Methodology ==
In constructing a gradsect, existing information is initially reviewed in which a hierarchy of environmental gradients is first identified either by visual means (maps, aerial photographs etc..) or through numerical analysis or spatial analysis of institutional or other data sources. A typical regional gradsect for example may be constructed according to a primary climate gradient (temperature, moisture, seasonality) then a secondary gradient (geomorphology, lithology, major and minor drainage systems), a tertiary gradient possibly represented by a local soil catena or local land use farming system or finer scale gradient levels representing local vegetational sequences. Through an inspection of spatial overlays of all gradients, a minimum number of sample locations is then purposively located to reflect, as far as possible, total environmental variation. For logistic and other purposes (such as improving the capacity to locate rare species) the steepest gradients are usually selected. In this way an ideal gradsect is constructed that may then be modified to accommodate logistic tradeoffs. The selection discipline requires that the fullest possible range of each hierarchical level is sampled. This commonly results in a set of progressively nested clusters of sample sites contained within the overarching primary gradient that may not reflect a linear distribution. At relatively local landscape scale, a primary gradients may be represented by salinity levels or water depth as in tidal wetlands or micro-topographic relief as in forest margins or a riparian zone. For most practical purposes, transects are commonly laid out along contours perpendicular to the main direction of the gradient. Iterative spatial analysis of environmental layers over a digital elevation model can then be used to identify areas requiring additional sampling thereby improving environmental representativeness.

== Advantages and limitations ==
Initial studies in gradsect development revealed considerable logistic and other advantages over more traditional non-gradient-based survey designs concerned primarily with random sampling. This finding is now widely supported especially in biodiversity and other areas of environmental surveying and conservation design (see Applications next). Apart from improved logistic efficiency, the gradsect method seeks to maximise environmental representativeness which has the dual advantage of potentially improving location of rarities and enhancing spatial modelling of species distribution. Because the underlying statistical model is not based on probability theory, gradsect sampling cannot be used to estimate numbers of species or other biological attributes per unit area. For that purpose some measure of random sampling needs to be built into the sample design.

== Applications ==
Since the publication of gradsect theory in 1984, subsequent vegetational and landscape studies in regional Australia (Austin and Heyligers 1989); Ludwig and Tongway (1995) were followed by a successful evaluation of the method in faunal surveys in South Africa (Wessels et al.). Since then applications involving gradsects have ranged from habitat suitability studies of fungi (Shearer and Crane 2011 ), termites (Gillison et al. 2003) other macro invertebrates (Lawes et al. 2005 ); birds (Damalas 2005) small and large mammals (Laurance 1994; Ramono et al. 2009). Vegetation studies using gradsects have been widely applied in many countries ranging from tidal wetlands (Parker et al. 2011) and agricultural cropping systems and forested landscape mosaics (Gillison et al. 2004) to infectious diseases (Boone et al. 2000 ). At broader geographic and national scales (Grossman et al., 1998, 2007; USA/NPS 2012) gradsects have been applied to guide field sampling and forest mapping in mountainous terrain (Sandman and Lertzmann 2003) as well as wide-ranging remote sensing applications (Mallinis et al. 2008; Rocchini et al. 2011 ).
