= Transect =

Path along which organisms are recorded

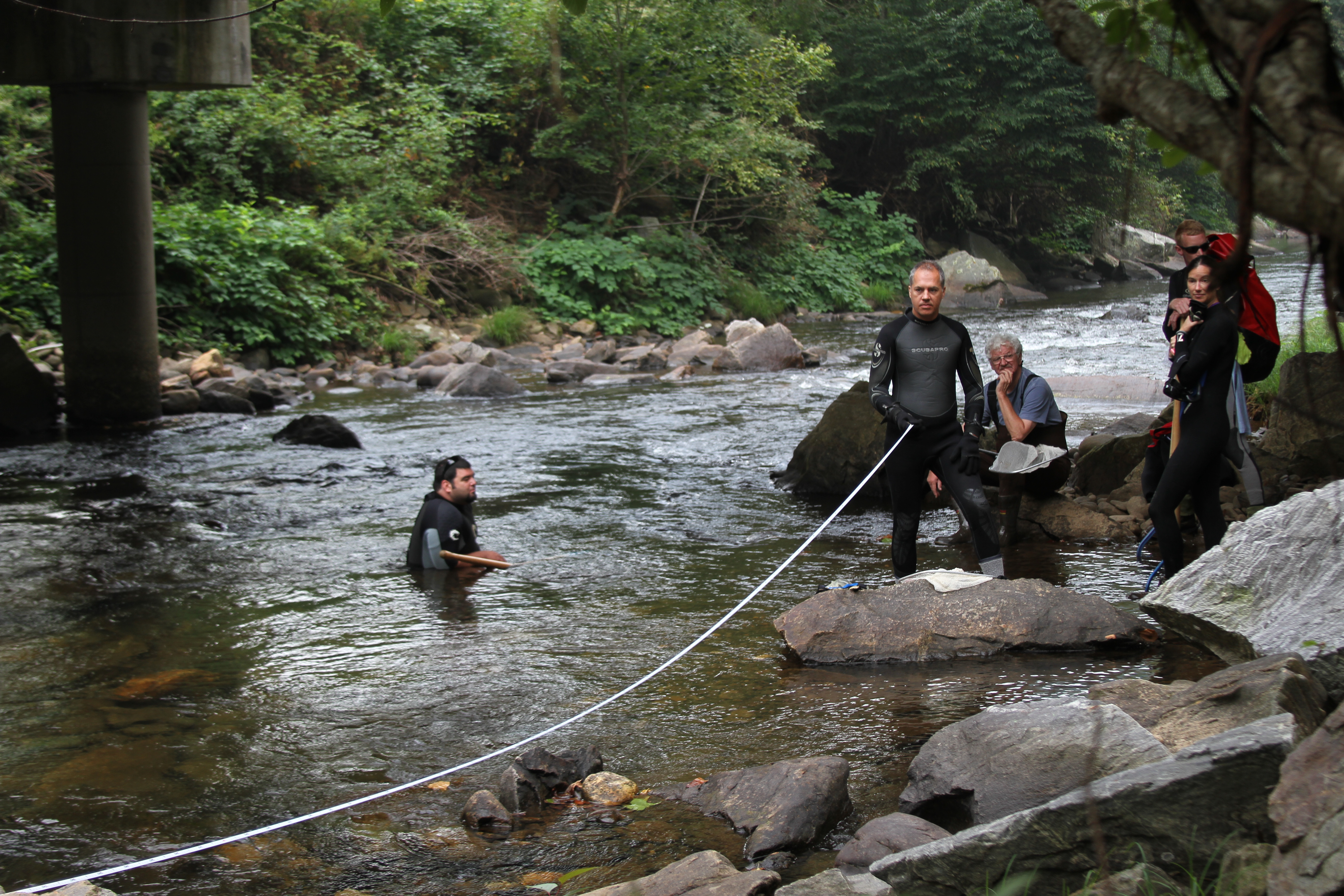
A transect running across a stream.

A transect is a path along which one counts and records occurrences of the objects of study (e.g. plants).

It requires an observer to move along a fixed path and to count occurrences along the path and, at the same time (in some procedures), obtain the distance of the object from the path. This results in an estimate of the area covered and an estimate of the way in which detectability increases from probability 0 (far from the path) towards 1 (near the path). Using the raw count and this probability function, one can arrive at an estimate of the actual density of objects.

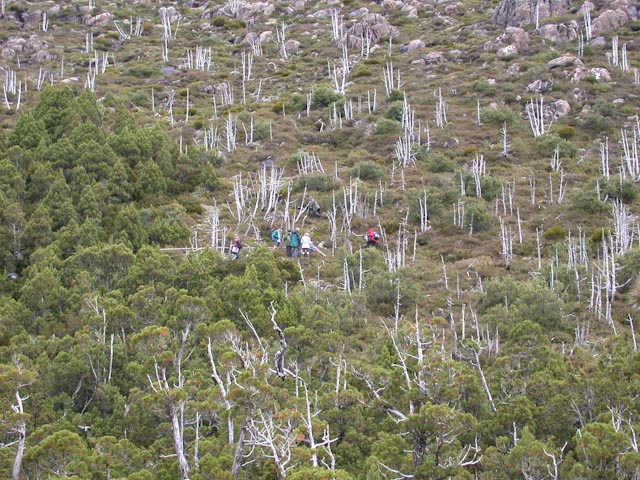
Transects being used to measure the changes around the boundary of a grassland fire near Backhouse Tarn, Tasmania.

The estimation of the abundance of populations (such as terrestrial mammal species) can be achieved using a number of different types of transect methods, such as strip transects, line transects, belt transects, point transects, gradsects and curved line transects.

== See also ==
- Census – Compilation of information about a given population
- Mark and recapture – Animal population estimation method – Method for estimating a species population size
- Distance sampling – Methods for estimating the density and/or abundance of populations
- MegaTransect – 1999 ecological survey of Africa
