= Rani Hoff =

American epidemiologist

Rani A. Hoff is a professor of psychiatry and a director of a national center for Post-traumatic stress disorder (PTSD) at Yale University.

== Life and work ==
Rani Hoff, daughter of Robert and Victoria Hoff, grew up in Erie, Pennsylvania, and first became a concertmaster of the Erie Philharmonic Youth orchestra at the age of 10. She graduated with a BS in mathematics and biology from Mercyhurst University in 1985 at the age of 16, and within the next two months she joined the Army and was reporting to basic training in Fort Jackson, South Carolina, hoping to become a medical specialist.

After her discharge from the Army, she enrolled at Yale University where she received her MPH in chronic disease epidemiology, and her PhD in mental health services research and psychiatric epidemiology. Upon completion of her studies, she joined the staff at Yale and was promoted to full professor in 2013.

Her research examines risk factors and correlates of several psychiatric disorders, paying particular attention to disorders that occur together. This research has included studies on pathological gambling, schizophrenia, substance abuse/dependence, the risk of suicide in psychiatric patients, trauma and comorbidity, criminal justice mental health, and the mental health problems experienced by the homeless.

Hoff is a former associate director of the Robert Wood Johnson Foundation Clinical Scholars Program and the head of the Women and Trauma Core of Women’s Health at Yale.

== Selected publications ==
- Bruce, Martha L., and Rani A. Hoff. "Social and physical health risk factors for first-onset major depressive disorder in a community sample." Social psychiatry and psychiatric epidemiology 29 (1994): 165-171.
- Hoff, Rani A., and Robert A. Rosenheck. "The cost of treating substance abuse patients with and without comorbid psychiatric disorders." Psychiatric Services 50, no. 10 (1999): 1309-1315.
- Leeman, Robert F., Rani A. Hoff, Suchitra Krishnan-Sarin, Julie A. Patock-Peckham, and Marc N. Potenza. "Impulsivity, sensation-seeking, and part-time job status in relation to substance use and gambling in adolescents." Journal of Adolescent Health 54, no. 4 (2014): 460-466.
- Resnick, Sandra G., and Rani A. Hoff. "Observations from the national implementation of Measurement Based Care in Mental Health in the Department of Veterans Affairs." Psychological services 17, no. 3 (2020): 238.
