= Van Hove =

Van Hove is a Dutch toponymic surname meaning "from/of Hove", often referring to an origin in the town Hove in the province of Antwerp; the surname is most common in Antwerp and East Flanders. Notable people with the surname include:

- Bart van Hove (1850–1914), Dutch sculptor
- Bartholomeus van Hove (painter) (1790–1880), Dutch painter
- Benjamin van Hove (born 1981), Belgian field hockey player
- Charlotte Vanhove (1771–1860), Dutch-born French comedy stage actress
- Eric Van Hove (born 1975), Belgian conceptual artist, social entrepreneur, poet and traveler
- Francine Van Hove (born 1942), French painter
- Fred Van Hove (1937–2022), Belgian jazz musician
- Hubertus van Hove (1814–1865), Dutch painter, son of Bartholomeus
- Ivo van Hove (born 1958), Belgian theater director
- Jozef Van Hove (1919–2014), Belgian comics writer and artist known as Pom
- Léon Van Hove (1924–1990), Belgian physicist
  - Van Hove singularity
- Luc van Hove (born 1957), Belgian composer
- Peter van Hove (died 1793), Flemish theologian
- René van Hove (1913–1997), Dutch racing cyclist

== See also ==
- Van Hoof
