= Two-Piece Reclining Figure No. 9 =

Sculpture series by Henry Moore

Coordinates: 43°10′35.0″N 87°56′10.0″W

- Lynden Sculpture Garden, Milwaukee, Wisconsin
- Artist: Henry Moore
- Year: 1967
- Catalogue: LH 576
- Type: bronze
- Dimensions: 140 cm × 230 cm × 130 cm (54 in × 90 in × 50 in)

Two-Piece Reclining Figure No. 9 is a bronze sculpture of 1967 by the English artist Henry Moore, which exists in several versions and is catalogued as LH 576.

== Locations ==
Casts are located at the National Library of Australia, in Canberra, the Norton Simon Museum in Pasadena, California, the Lynden Sculpture Garden near Milwaukee, Wisconsin, and the Kansas City Sculpture Park.

== Description ==
The bronze sculpture is an abstract, androgynous reclining form; it rests on a base installed on the lawn.

== See also ==
- List of sculptures by Henry Moore
- Reclining Figure 1969–70
- Two-Piece Reclining Figure: Points
