= Hofgarten =

Hofgarten is German for "court garden" and refers to the gardens of a seat or Residenz of a noble family, usually a reigning prince or sovereign.

Important court gardens with this name are found in:

- Ansbach
- Augsburg
- Bayreuth
- Bonn
- Coburg
- Düsseldorf
- Eichstätt
- Innsbruck, see Hofgarten, Innsbruck
- Kempten (Allgäu)
- Landshut
- Munich, see Hofgarten (Munich)
- Veitshöchheim, see Veitshöchheim Castle
- Weihenstephan Hofgarten
- Würzburg, see Würzburg Residenz

== See also ==
- Court (royal)
- Hof (disambiguation)
