= Hof bei Straden =

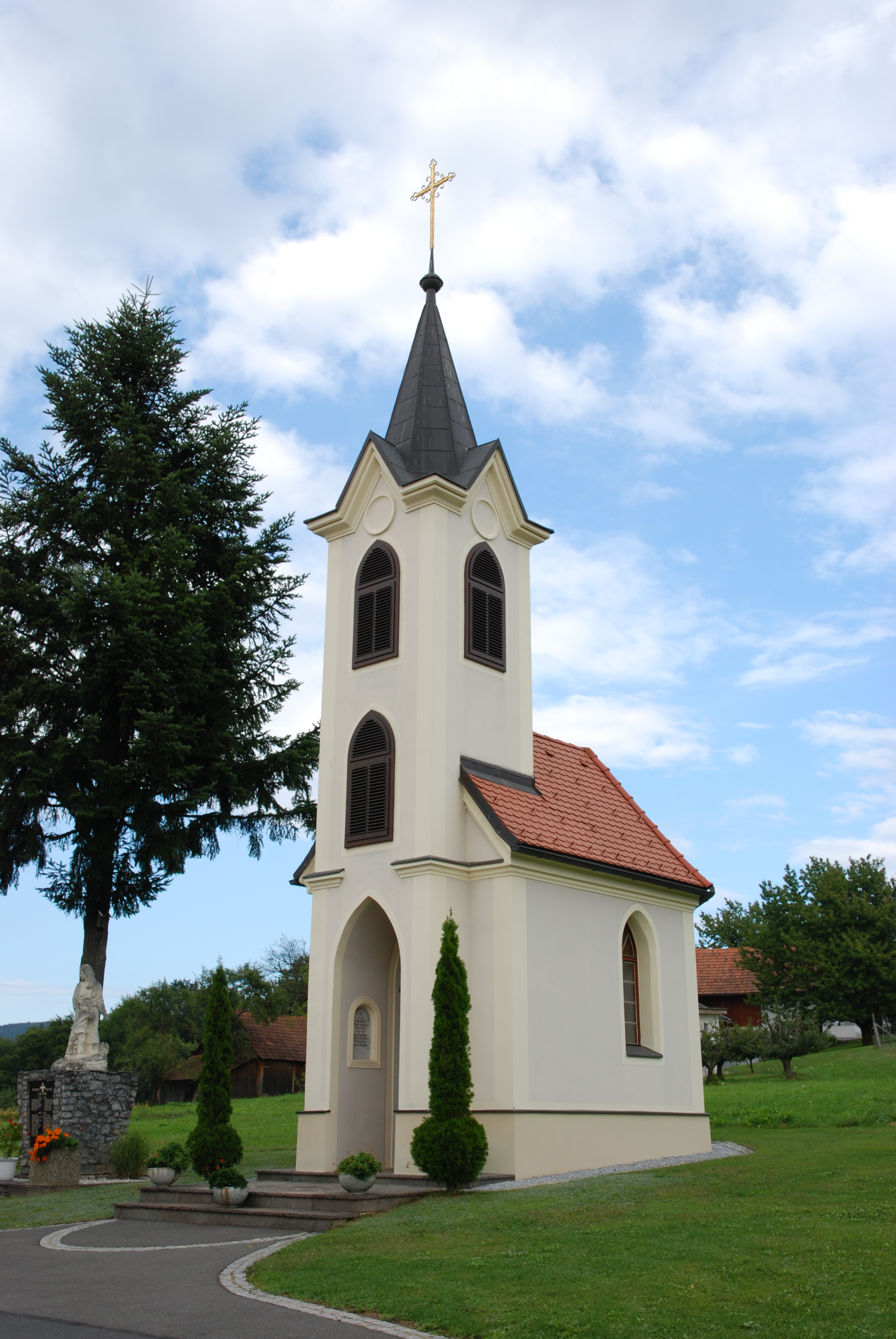
- Chapel in Neusetz (part of Hof bei Straden)

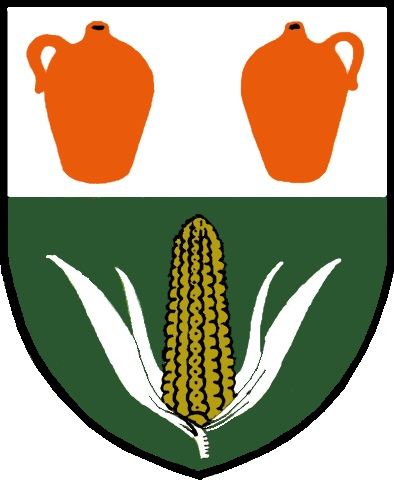
- Coat of arms

- Location within Austria
- Coordinates: 46°48′02″N 15°53′40″E
- Country: Austria
- State: Styria
- District: Südoststeiermark

Government
  - Mayor: Richard Pock (BLH)

Area
  - Total: 17.18 km^{2} (6.63 sq mi)
- Elevation: 250 m (820 ft)

Population (1 January 2016)
  - Total: 880
  - Density: 51/km^{2} (130/sq mi)
- Time zone: UTC+1 (CET)
  - Summer (DST): UTC+2 (CEST)
- Postal code: 8345
- Area code: 03473
- Vehicle registration: RA
- Website: www.hof-straden.steiermark.at

Hof bei Straden is a former municipality in the district of Südoststeiermark in Austrian state of Styria. Since the 2015 Styria municipal structural reform, it is part of the municipality Straden.

== Population ==
Historical population
Year	Pop.	±%
1869	1,386	—
1880	1,428	+3.0%
1890	1,531	+7.2%
1900	1,390	−9.2%
1910	1,392	+0.1%
1923	1,348	−3.2%
1934	1,281	−5.0%
1939	1,188	−7.3%
1951	1,126	−5.2%
1961	1,088	−3.4%
1971	1,031	−5.2%
1981	944	−8.4%
1991	886	−6.1%
2001	890	+0.5%
2012	880	−1.1%
