= Chris Van Hoof =

Chris Van Hoof is a full professor at KU Leuven’s Faculty of Engineering Science, vice-president of Connected Health Solutions, and fellow at IMEC, and general manager of OnePlanet Research Center.

== Education ==
In 1992, Van Hoof received his PhD in Electrical Engineering from the University of Leuven in collaboration with IMEC.

== OnePlanet Research Center ==
Van Hoof is general manager of OnePlanet Research Center. In February 2019, the Dutch government provided a 65 million euro grant to create the research venture, which is a multidisciplinary collaboration agreement between IMEC, Wageningen University & Research, Radboud University, and Radboud University Medical Center.

At OnePlanet, Van Hoof oversees fundamental and applied research and aims to use the latest chip and digital technologies to create novel health and agriculture technology-based solutions. Agrifood and health scientists are developing technologies to help people eat and live healthier, while ensuring a sustainable supply chain.

== IMEC ==
At IMEC, Van Hoof oversees all research that goes into wearables, smart sensors and other connected health-related technology, such as ingestible and invisible body monitoring technologies. Van Hoof previously held positions at IMEC as manager and director leading research on sensors, imagers, 3D integration, MEMS, energy harvesting, body area networks, biomedical electronics, and wearable health. Van Hoof’s research at IMEC has been published in leading scientific journals, such as Nature.

=== Digital Twin Technology ===
Van Hoof is applying digital twin technology to build a more complete picture of an individual’s lifestyle, behavior and environment, with the aim of preventing and intercepting diseases that currently rely on longitudinal recordings.

=== EEG Headset ===
In 2018, IMEC announced that Van Hoof and his team had developed a prototype of an electroencephalogram (EEG) headset that can measure emotions and cognitive processes in the brain.

=== Health Patch ===
In 2016, Van Hoof and his team at IMEC presented a small-form health patch that was reported to have more functionalities than any other patch available on the market. The chip was optimized for low power consumption and was combined with an electrode patch that can stay on the body for long periods of time, including when showering.
