= David L. Hoof =

American novelist (born 1945)

- Born: December 2, 1945 (age 80); Washington, D.C., U.S.
- Education: Deerfield Academy; Cornell University; Purdue University
- Occupation: Novelist
- Writing career
- Pen name: David Lorne; Grace Alter

David L. Hoof (born December 2, 1945, in Washington, D.C.) is an American novelist.

Hoof is a graduate of Deerfield Academy, where he was a successful swimmer, serving as his team's captain one year and earning All American honors three years. He took his bachelor's degree in chemistry at Cornell University as a Meinig National Scholar. Undertaking graduate and post-graduate studies, Hoof matriculated at Purdue University, earning his doctorate. His National Science Foundation postdoctoral fellowship was completed at Georgetown University. Following a stint as a teacher at Montgomery College, Hoof was employed by the United States Department of Energy, where he was part of the nuclear reactor fuel reprocessing program.

== Expertise ==
Hoof wrote nationally for magazines before embarking as a career on a novelist. In 1990, the same year that he published his first novel, Sight Unseen, under the pen name "David Lorne", he left the U.S. Department of Energy to pursue a full-time writing career, though he has also since taught creative writing at Georgetown University and the Writers’ Digest School. In 1991, Hoof released The Last Prisoner, and in 1992, he published Blind Man's Bluff, a sequel to Sight Unseen. Detailing the adventures of Spike Halleck, the books were followed by a third, Blind Rage, published exclusively in Japanese. The series has subsequently been translated into Dutch, Danish and Bulgarian. It has also been optioned for film. In 2005, Hoof published The Suicide Diary under the pen name "Grace Alter", following up in 2006 with Little Gods under his own name. Shadow Line Press then published Triple Jeopardy, his seventh novel, in 2010, just as his screenplay Landfill went into production by Impact Motion Pictures.

== Sample Publications ==
- David L. Hoof, Little Gods (2006);
- David L. Hoof, et alia, "Studies on metal carboxylates. Part IV. Pyridine-2,6-dicarboxylate complexes of cobalt(II), nickel(II), rhodium(II), and rhodium(III). Synthesis, spectral and magnetic properties, and a study of rhodium 3d binding energies by X-ray photoelectron spectroscopy," Journal of the Chemistry Society (1973) at 1035.
