= Werner Janssen (philosopher) =

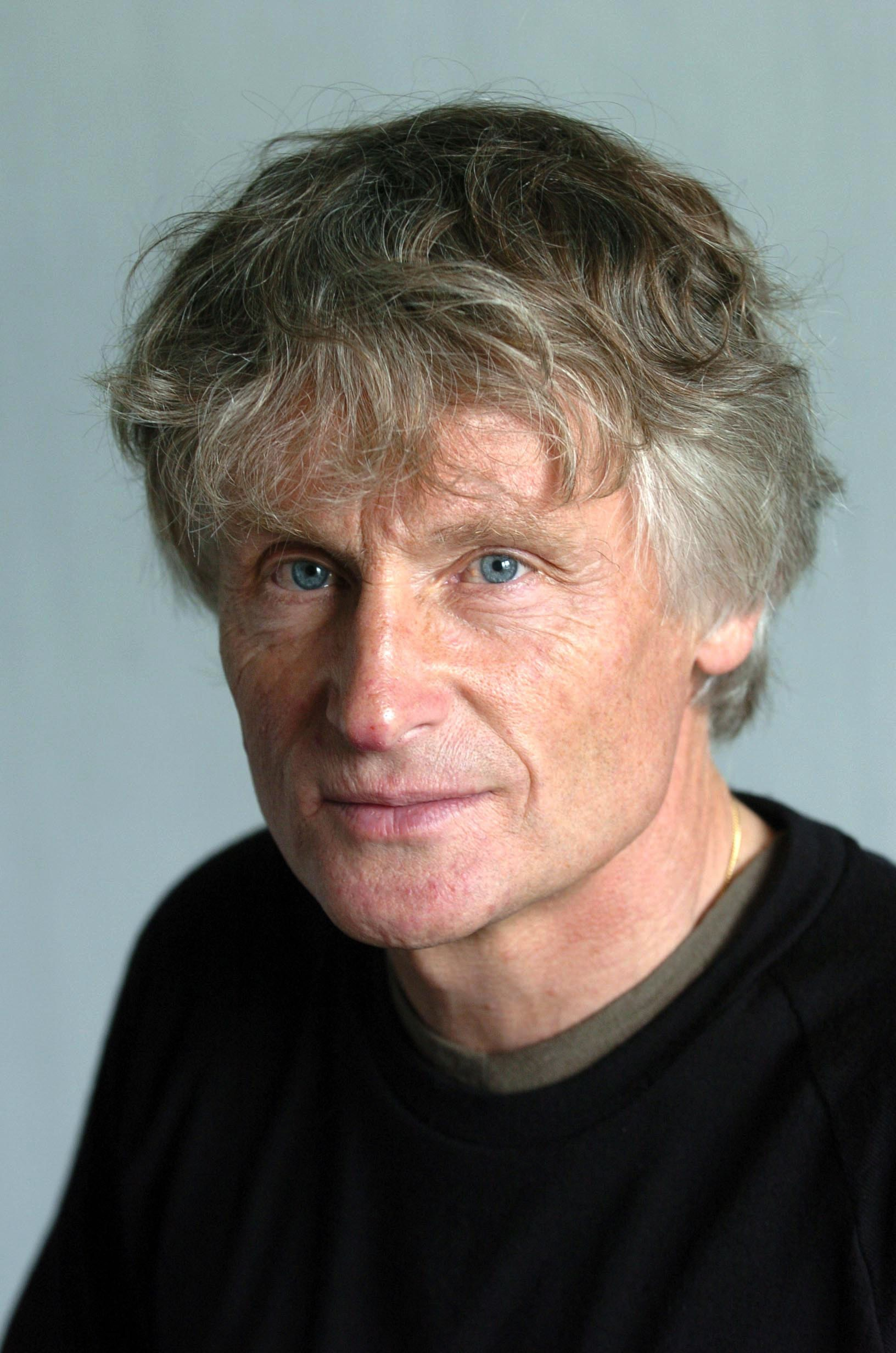
Werner Heinrich Janssen

Werner Heinrich Janssen (born 7 August 1944 in Mönchengladbach) is a Dutch/German philosopher, Germanist, author and poet under the pseudonym Heinz Hof.

== Career ==
Werner Janssen grew up both in Germany (Monchengladbach) and in the Netherlands (Kerkrade/Heerlen). He studied at the Universities of Nijmegen, Heidelberg, Amsterdam and Aachen German language and literature, philosophy, sociology, pedagogy, ethnology, political science, psychology and dialect knowledge.

Very first he graduated in 1984 to Dr. lit. at the University of Amsterdam with the thesis Der Rhythmus bei Heinrich Böll, 1985 published by Peter-Lang-Verlag. At the University of Aachen, the Rhenish-Westphalian Technical University he graduated in 1991 to Dr. phil. with the thesis Kultur und Spiel – die dialogische Erweiterung des natürlichen Spielraums, also published by Peter Lang.

He is chairman of the Curatorium of the Martin Buber-Award, which is annually granted since 2002 at the International Culture and Science Festival Euriade, which was set up by him in 1981 and which director he is, just as he is the director of the International Chamber Music Festival AmadèO – Academia Musica da Camera.

He taught German Language and Philosophy at Bernardinuscollege in Heerlen, and is now professor of Philosophy and Germanistics among others at the Lomonosov University of Moscow.

He gave/gives guest lectures at the Universities of Perm (Ural), Vienna, Graz and Heerlen.

With the pseudonym Heinz Hof he writes poetry.

== Excerpt of his publications ==
- Der Rhythmus des Humanen bei Heinrich Böll. Peter Lang, Frankfurt am Main 1985, ISBN 3-8204-7498-6
- Kultur und Spiel. Die dialogische Erweiterung des natürlichen Spielraums. Peter Lang, Frankfurt am Main 1991, ISBN 3-631-44209-2
- Een bloem tussen het puin. Inleiding tot de verhalen en romans van Heinrich Böll. Walva-Boek, Laren 1991, ISBN 90-6675-157-6
- Lies und sprich! Gespreksvaardigheid voor de onderbouw. Walraven, Apeldoorn 1995, ISBN 90-5564-015-8
- Von der Straße in die Baracken … und dann? Lang, Frankfurt am Main 1995, ISBN 3-631-48293-0
- Eine Blume zwischen den Trümmern. Einführung in das Leben und Werk von Heinrich Böll. Erebodos, Voerendaal 2005, ISBN 90-809495-1-5
- Du. Gedichte. Eine Begegnung zwischen dem Dichter Heinz Hof und dem Maler Antonio Máro. Erebodos, Voerendaal 2006, ISBN 90-809495-3-1
- Mozartina. Neue Mozartbriefe zur Zeit. Erebodos, Voerendaal 2006
- Kind, Gedichte exercises about child with paintings and photos by Antonio Máro, Rafael Ramírez and Jorgen Polman. 2007
- Liebeslicht. Gedichte and Märchen by the 80th anniversary of Antonio Máro. 2008
- Symphonia, Die Kunst des Dialogs. Philosophische Betrachtungen. Erebodos, Voerendaal 2009. ISBN 978-94-90456-01-6
- Essays und Betrachtungen in several magazines of the EURIADE-Magazine for Culture and Science „EuriArtes“.
