= MOMbies Dance to Donate =

Philanthropic initiative to support breast cancer research

MOMbies Dance to Donate is a philanthropic initiative spearheaded by a collective of mothers in Fairfield, Connecticut, who dress as "ghastly zombies" and hold dance performances to raise funds to support metastatic breast cancer research. Originating with a flash mob performance on Halloween night in 2016, the initiative supports the Cancer Couch Foundation. As of Halloween 2023, Mombies Dance to Donate had successfully raised over $180,000 and created an annual tradition in their New England community.

== History ==
In fall 2016, Terry Davis, the creator and director of MOMbies, envisioned a flash mob of spooky moms surprising their kids and neighbors on Halloween. A group of local mothers began regular rehearsals. On Halloween night, dressed in homemade costumes, the moms emerged as zombies from bushes, driveways, and front porches to dance in the street. The choreography of the MOMbies' performances was orchestrated by Vinny Patino and Paul Herman.

The MOMbies' dance performances have gone viral online, attracting national and international attention. Their annual Halloween performances have changed over the years, featuring new music and choreography, and including Fairfield University students and local first responders.

=== The Cancer Couch Foundation ===
The core mission of MOMbies is to "dance to donate"; they raise funds for metastatic breast cancer research through the Cancer Couch Foundation. The Cancer Couch Foundation was founded in 2015 by Dr. Rebecca Timlin-Scalera, who was battling stage four metastatic breast cancer; Timlin-Scalera died in 2019. The foundation funds research at Dana-Farber Cancer Institute and Memorial Sloan Kettering Cancer Center.
