= Hoff (surname) =

Hoff is a surname. Notable people with the surname include:

- August Bernhard Carl Hoff (1886–1971), Lutheran pastor of Koonibba Mission in South Australia
- Benjamin Hoff, American author whose works are influenced by Taoism
- Bobby Hoff, American professional poker player
- Charles Hoff (1902–1985), Norwegian athlete, coach, sports journalist, novelist and sports administrator
- Chet Hoff, American baseball pitcher
- Christian Hoff, American actor
- C. Clayton Hoff (1908–1983), American arachnologist
- Ebbe Hoff, American doctor who researched neurology, substance abuse and diving medicine
- Edwin H. Hoff (1921-2007), American politician
- Elke Hoff (born 1957), German politician (FDP)
- Gustav A. Hoff (1852–1930), American politician
- Hans Hoff (1897–1969), Austrian psychiatrist and neurologist
- William Cooper (novelist), known as Harry Hoff, English novelist
- Jan Gunnar Hoff, Norwegian jazz pianist, composer, arranger and professor
- Jeanne Hoff (1938–2023), American psychiatrist
- Karl Hoff (1838-1890), German painter
- Katie Hoff, American swimmer
- Marcian Hoff, American co-inventor of the microprocessor and Intel executive
- Max Hoff, German sprint kayaker
- Philip H. Hoff (1924–2018), American lawyer and Governor of Vermont
- Rayner Hoff, Australian sculptor
- Ron van der Hoff, Dutch Olympic archer
- Susan Dew Hoff, American physician
- Susanna Hoffs, American musician
- Syd Hoff, American children's author and cartoonist
- Thomas Hoff, 2008 Olympic volleyball gold medalist & session chair of the FOB Workshop Week.

== See also ==
- Hof (surname)
- von Hoff surname
- Van 't Hof, a Dutch surname
- Jacobus Henricus van 't Hoff, Dutch winner of the first Nobel Prize in chemistry
