= Lieve Van Hoof =

Research Professor at Ghent University

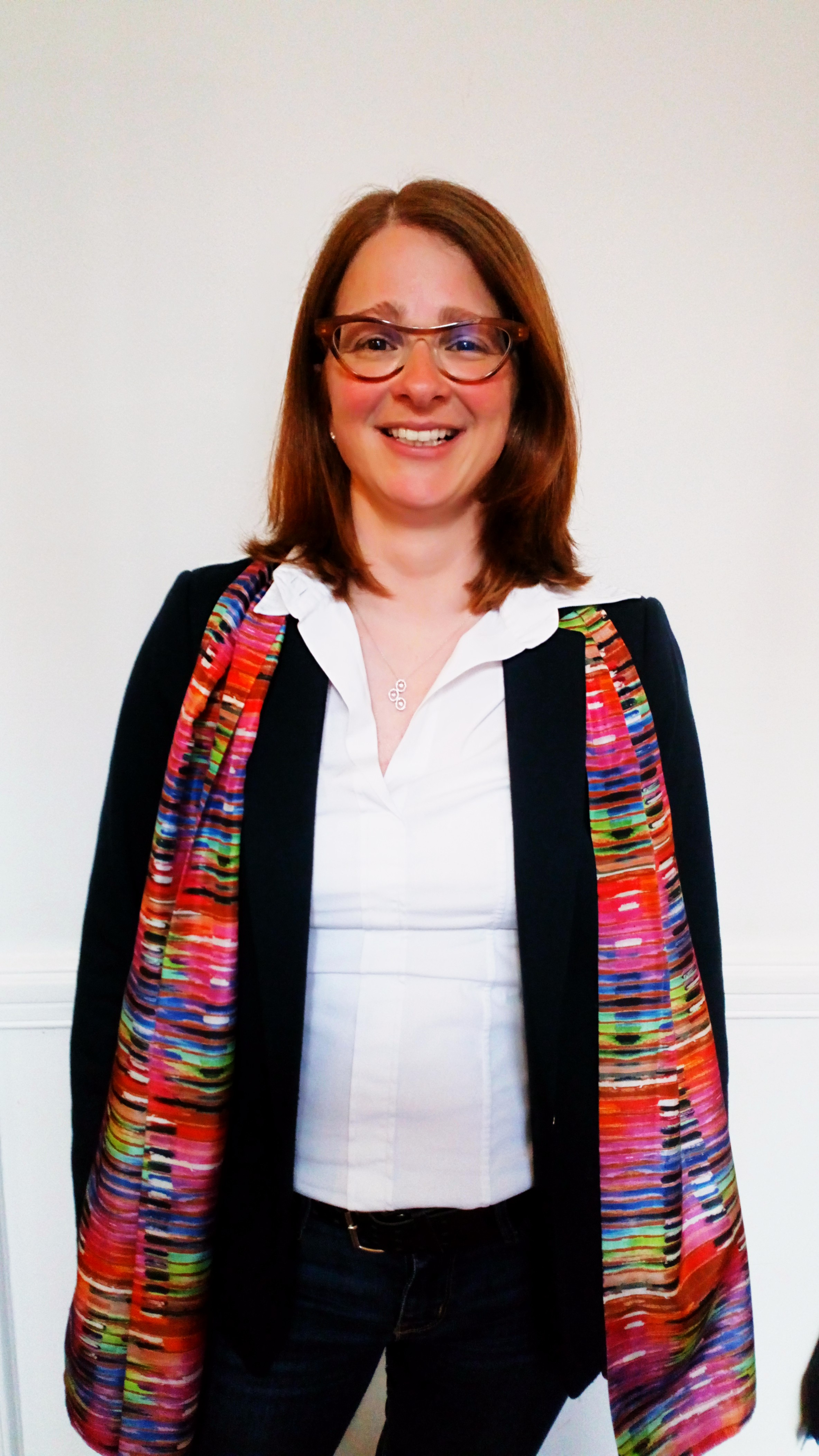
- Professor Lieve Van Hoof

Academic background
- Education: KU Leuven
- Thesis: The Social Dynamics of Philosophy. Reading Plutarch's 'Popular-Philosophical' Writings
- Doctoral advisor: Luc Van der Stockt, Tim Whitmarsh

Academic work
- Discipline: Classics
- Institutions: Ghent University
- Notable works: Plutarch's Practical Ethics: The Social Dynamics of Philosophy (2010)

Lieve Van Hoof is a Belgian classical scholar and Research Professor at the University of Ghent. She specialises in work on the socio-political role of Greek and Latin literature in the Roman Empire. Van Hoof is currently engaged in examining Greek and Latin letters in order to understand lobbying in late antiquity. Van Hoof is known in particular for her work on Plutarch and Libanius.

== Career ==
Van Hoof was awarded her PhD at KU Leuven in 2006 with a thesis on The Social Dynamics of Philosophy. Reading Plutarch's 'Popular-Philosophical' Writings. The work was subsequently published in 2010 as Plutarch's Practical Ethics: the Social Dynamics of Philosophy. The monograph was recognised as the first time a scholar had taken work by Plutarch, often dismissed as "popular philosophy", and seriously evaluated its effect on non-philosophical Graeco-Roman elites.

Van Hoof spent the academic year 2011-12 as a Senior Humboldt Research Fellow at the University of Bonn working on the social role of literature in the fourth century CE, and 2012-13 as a Fellow in Residence at the Göttingen Institute for Advanced Study working on Late antique epistolography.

Van Hoof was President of the University of Ghent Postdoc community 2015–17, and in 2016 she won the Hermes Award for Public Engagement and Knowledge Transfer for "extraordinary spirit and effectiveness with which the proponents of this initiative push forward the improvement and visibility of the postdoc status. This combination of policy and professional service, and a grassroots platform has since developed into an international best practice."

On 1 April 2017 Van Hoof was elected as co-chair-person of De Jonge Academie, a role she held for two years. In 2018 the academy celebrated their five-year anniversary, and Van Hoof hosted the King Philippe of Belgium.

Van Hoof's current research project (2019-2022), Lobbying in late antiquity. Letters, networks and decision processes (4th - 5th c. A.D.), takes a fresh approach to the institution structures and powers of late antiquity to focus on individuals and interest groups who sought to influence those in power. The project uses collections of letters, such as those of Quintus Aurelius Symmachus, to examine how official decisions could be influenced.

== Selected publications ==
- Peter Van Nuffelen and Lieve Van Hoof, The Greek Fragmentary Chronicles After Eusebius : Edition, Translation, and Commentary (Cambridge: Cambridge University Press, 2019)
- Lieve Van Hoof and Peter Van Nuffelen, The Latin Fragmentary Historians of Late Antiquity (300 – 650 A.D.): Edition, Translation, and Commentary (Cambridge: Cambridge University Press, 2019)
- with Peter Van Nuffelen "The historiography of crisis: Jordanes, Cassiodorus and Justinian in mid-sixth-century Constantinople" in Journal of Roman Studies 107 p. 275-300 (2017)
- "Maximian of Ravenna, Chronica" in Sacris Erudiri: A Journal of Late Antique and Medieval Christianity 55 p. 259-276 (2016)
- Libanius: a critical introduction (Cambridge University Press, 2014)
- (ed.) with Peter Van Nuffelen Literature and Society in the Fourth Century AD: Performing 'paideia', Constructing the Present, Presenting the Self (Mnemosyne supplements. Monographs on Greek and Latin language and literature, 373. Leiden; Boston: Brill, 2014)
- "Performing paideia: literature as an instrument for social promotion in the fourth century A.D." in Classical Quarterly 63(1). p. 387-406 (2013)
- "Why the EU is Failing in its Neighbourhood: The Case of Armenia" European Foreign Affairs Review, 17 Issue 2, pp. 285–302 (2012)
- with Peter Van Nuffelen "Monarchy and mass communication: Antioch A.D. 362/3 revisited" in Journal of Roman Studies 101. p. 166-184 (2011)
- Plutarch's Practical Ethics: The Social Dynamics of Philosophy (Oxford/New York: Oxford University Press, 2010)
