= Von Hoff =

Von Hoff or von Hoff is a surname. Notable people with the surname include:

- Bruce Von Hoff (1943–2012), American baseball player
- Karl Ernst Adolf von Hoff (1771–1837), German natural historian and geologist
- Steele Von Hoff (born 1987), Australian road racing cyclist

== See also ==
- Hoff (surname)
- van 't Hof
