= Huisman–Olff–Fresco models =

Huisman–Olff–Fresco models (HOF models) are a hierarchical set of five models with increasing complexity, designated for fitting unimodal species response curves on environmental gradient.

A implementation of the model including extension for bimodal distributions exists as an R module downloadable from CRAN.
