= Jeanne Hoff (psychiatrist) =

American psychiatrist

- Born: October 16, 1938; St. Louis, Missouri, U.S.
- Died: October 26, 2023 (aged 85); San Francisco, California, U.S.
- Education: Washington University in St. Louis (BA); Yale University (MS); Columbia University (MD); University College London (PhD)

Jeanne Hoff (October 16, 1938 – October 26, 2023) was an American psychiatrist. She was the first openly transgender psychiatrist to treat transgender patients.

== Early life and education ==
Hoff was born in St. Louis, Missouri, in 1938, the only child of James and Mary Hoff. She served as a member of the Coast Guard.

Hoff attended Washington University with support from a scholarship, graduating with a B.A. in 1960. She went on to earn a Master's of Science at Yale. She graduated from Columbia University with a medical degree in 1963. She earned her doctorate in solid state chemistry from University College London. Hoff's psychiatry training and residency was undertaken at Washington University School of Medicine in St. Louis.

== Career ==
Hoff worked with sexologist and endocrinologist Harry Benjamin, later taking over his practice in New York City in 1976. She later founded her own practice out of her home in the Manhattan neighborhood of Chelsea, which existed until the 1980s.

After closing her practice, Hoff worked in a Brooklyn psychiatric ward before moving to Hudson, New York. She was employed by a state-run outpatient clinic in nearby Kingston. She subsequently relocated to Pittsburgh and finally to Oakland, California, where she worked as a psychiatrist in the California prison system. She retired in 1999, after being assaulted by an inmate during a psychiatry session.

== Activism ==
Hoff was a member of the Harry Benjamin International Gender Dysphoria Association when it formed in 1979. Unlike some other psychiatrists at the time, Hoff recognized that sexual orientation and gender identity were independent of one another, and criticized psychiatrists who pressured transgender women to enter into relationships with cisgender men.

Hoff was the subject of the 1978 half-hour NBC documentary, Becoming Jeanne: A Search for Sexual Identity, which was hosted by Lynn Redgrave and Frank Field. The documentary covered Hoff's gender affirming surgery in December 1977. The documentary won an Ohio State Broadcasting Award in 1979, and was nominated for a New York Emmy in the category of Outstanding Documentary Program.

== Personal life ==
Hoff described herself as a "devout" Catholic, and was a member of the Catholic LGBT group Dignity. She also taught classes on sexuality at Dignity.

== Death and legacy ==
Hoff died in 2023 in San Francisco, from Parkinson's disease.

Her archives are held at the Kinsey Institute.
