= Perry Green, Hertfordshire =

Hamlet in Hertfordshire, England

Coordinates: 51.840°N 0.085°E

Perry Green is a scattered hamlet in Hertfordshire, England, near Much Hadham.

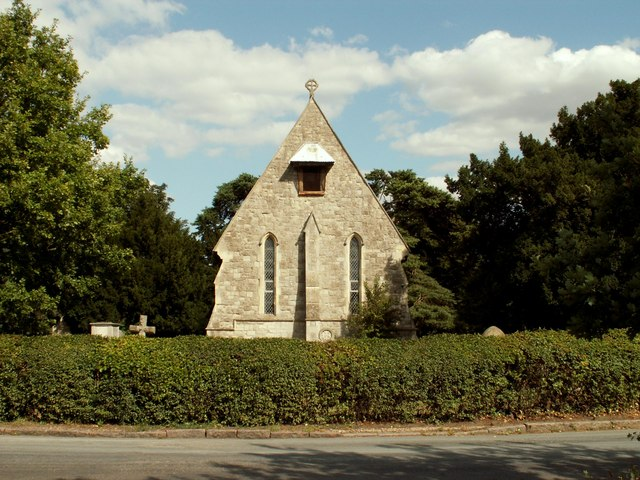
St. Thomas's Church, Perry Green.

The sculptor Henry Moore settled there in 1941. His house Hoglands now forms part of a sculpture garden featuring his work, run by the Henry Moore Foundation.

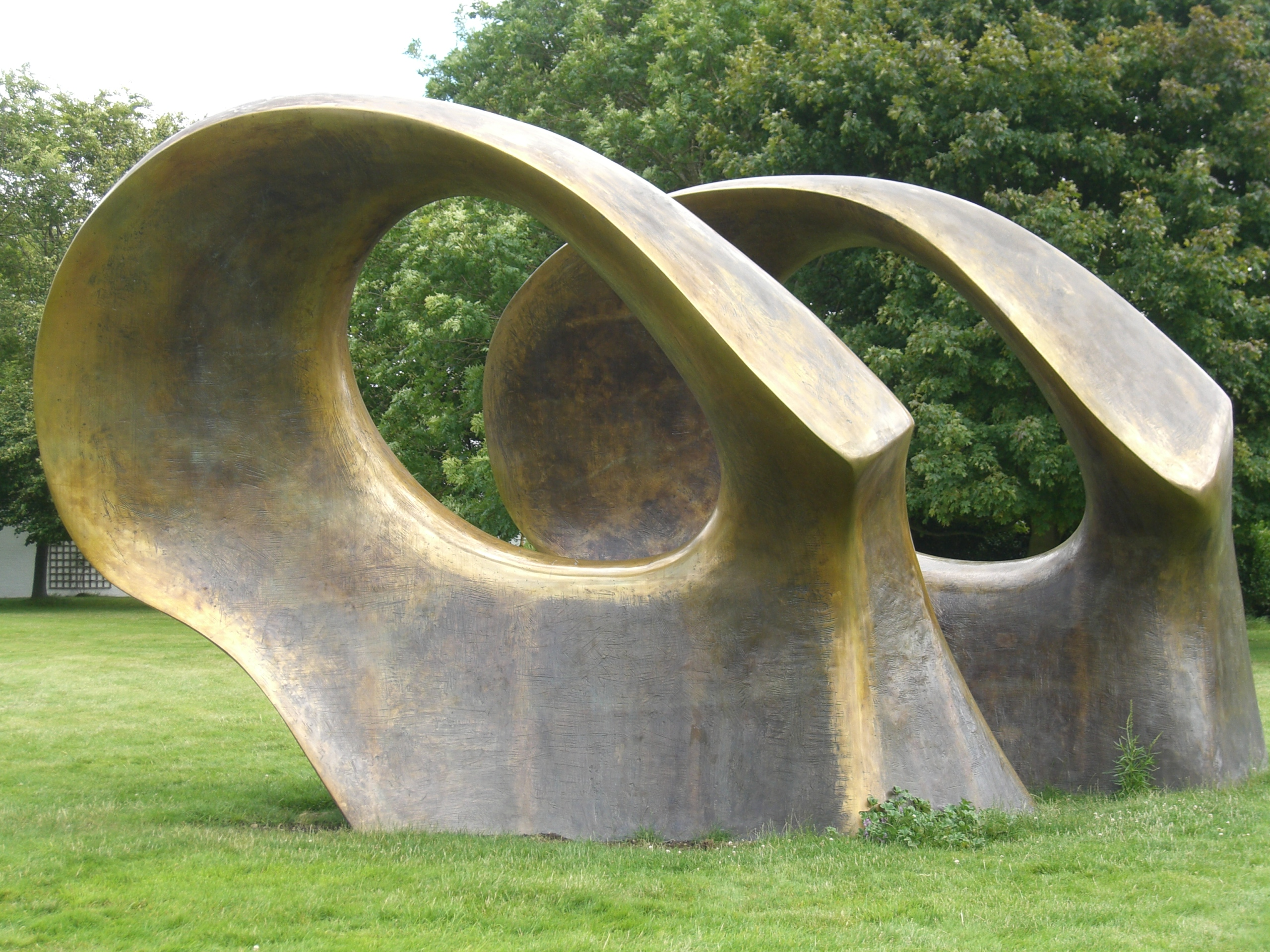
Double Oval by Henry Moore, from Henry Moore Sculpture Perry Green.
