= Henry Moore Foundation =

Art foundation in England

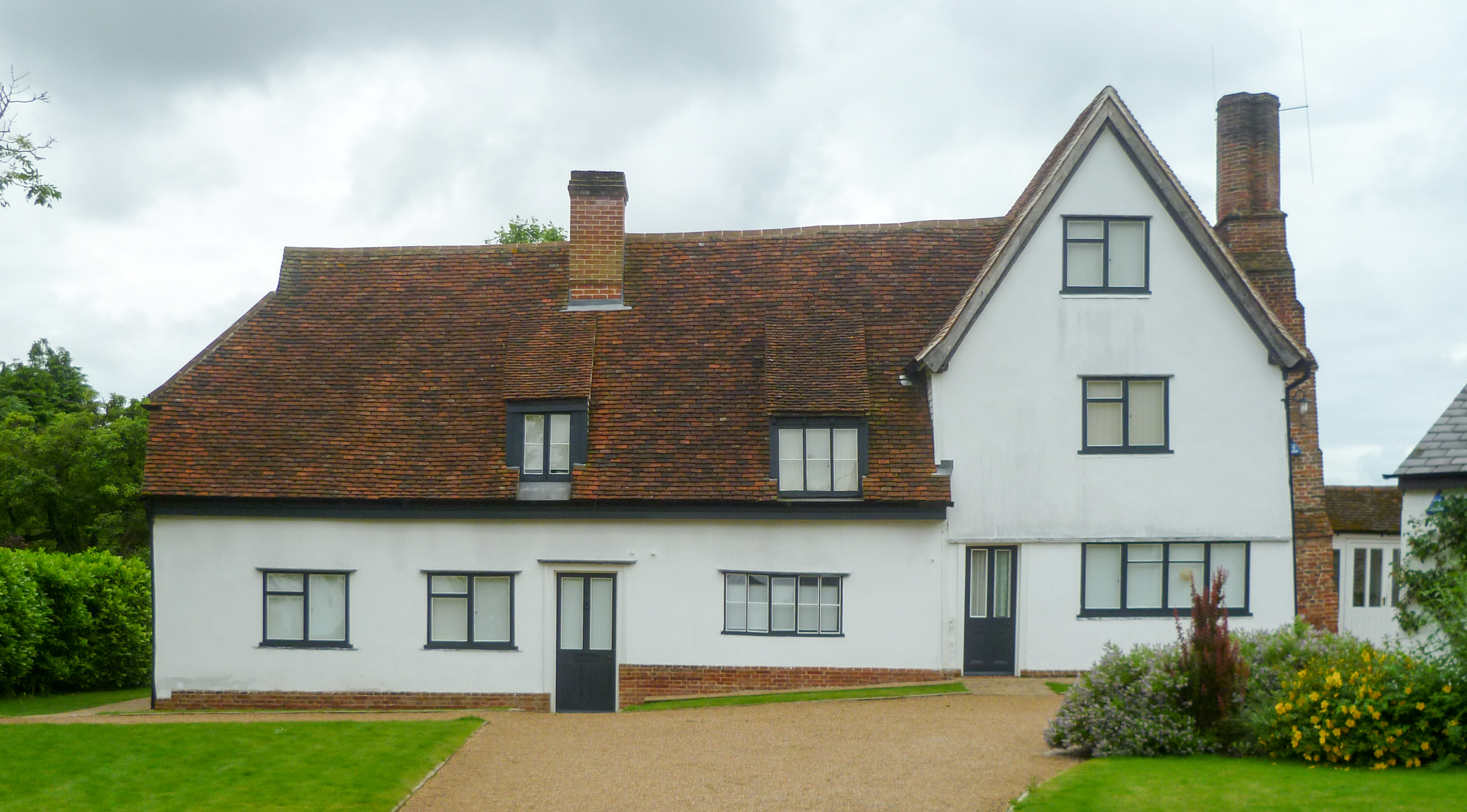
- Henry Moore's former home Hoglands, now the Foundation headquarters
- Named after: Henry Moore
- Established: 1977
- Type: Charitable organization
- Legal status: Foundation
- Headquarters: Hoglands, Perry Green, Hertfordshire, England
- Location(s): Perry Green, Hertfordshire and Leeds, West Yorkshire
- Coordinates: 51°50′13″N 0°05′11″E
- Region served: UK
- Fields: Visual arts
- Director: Godfrey Worsdale
- Website: www.henry-moore.org

The Henry Moore Foundation is a registered charity in England, established for education and promotion of the fine arts — in particular, to advance understanding of the works of Henry Moore, and to promote the public appreciation of sculpture more generally. The Foundation is also tasked with administering the sale, exhibition and conservation of Moore's work in perpetuity.

The charity was set up with a gift from the artist and his family in 1977. The Foundation supports a wide range of projects, including fellowships for artists and art historians and financial grants to various arts institutions. It is based in the UK and operates from two locations: Henry Moore Studios & Gardens in Perry Green in rural Hertfordshire, and the Henry Moore Institute in Leeds, West Yorkshire.

The current director of the Henry Moore Foundation is Godfrey Worsdale.

== Henry Moore Studios & Gardens, Perry Green ==
Henry Moore Studios & Gardens, Perry Green
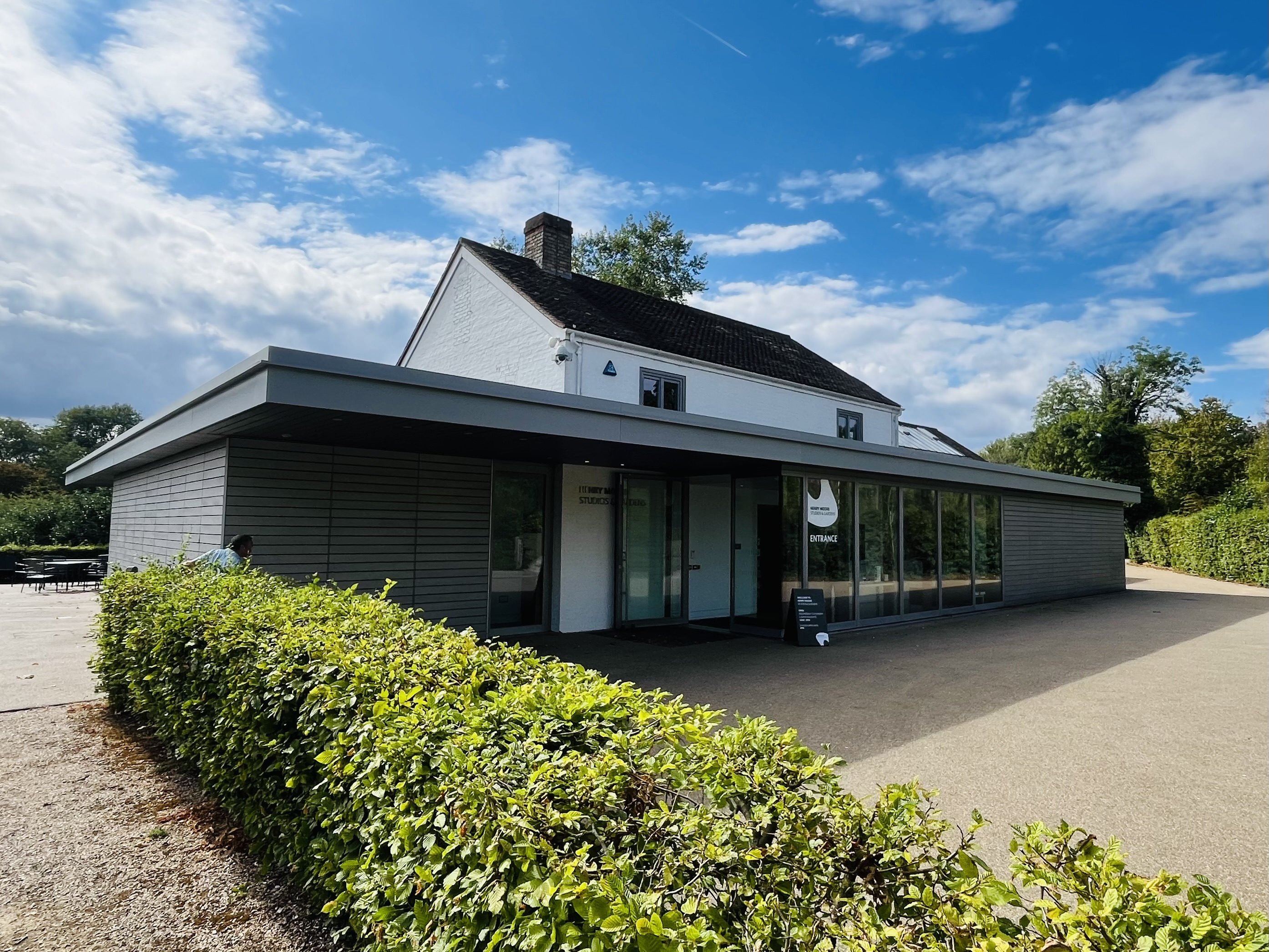
- The visitor centre

- Henry Moore Studios & Gardens location
- Location: Perry Green, Hertfordshire
- Coordinates: 51.837178°N 0.086189°E
- Type: Sculpture park
- Website: henry-moore.org/studios-and-gardens

Situated on the site of Moore's former home and studios in Perry Green, rural Hertfordshire, Henry Moore Studios & Gardens is the headquarters of the Henry Moore Foundation. The estate is open seasonally to everyone, with an admission fee.

=== Background ===
Henry and Irena Moore moved to Perry Green during the Second World War after their street in Hampstead was bombed, renting part of a farmhouse called 'Hoglands'. Though originally they planned to return to London when the war ended, they ended up staying in Perry Green for the rest of their lives. As Moore became more famous and sold more works over the following years, he bought Hoglands, followed by gradually buying more land and buildings in the surrounding area which he converted into studios for making different kinds of artwork.

=== Public operations ===
Around twenty of Moore's large-scale sculptural works are on display at Henry Moore Studios & Gardens, often changing depending on whether they are loaned elsewhere for exhibitions. The gardens span more than 70 acres, including Irena Moore's flower gardens, fruit trees, landscaped lawns, and less formal gardens and fields shared with local sheep.

There is a large, modern and fully accessible visitor centre, with a cafe and interpretation room.

Visitors can explore Moore's former studios, which have been preserved as the artist would have used them in his lifetime. The studios include:

- Top Studio – Moore's primary workspace after moving to Perry Green, now preserved as a carving studio.
- Etching Studio – converted from the old village shop and used by Moore to experiment in printmaking.
- Yellow Brick Studio – a multifunctional space used variously as a sculpture store, a space for photography and showing work to clients, and primarily as a carving studio.
- Plastic Studio – Moore often used temporary plastic, metal-framed structures while working on large-scale sculpture outdoors. One such structure is preserved on site, with examples of artworks and tools Moore worked with inside.
- Bourne Maquette Studio – Moore lined the walls of this studio with hundreds of smaller models and his ‘library of natural forms’ – the collection of bones, stones, shells and driftwood which captured his imagination and informed his work.
- The Summer House – a wooden summer house in which Moore produced drawings, originally mounted on a turntable so that Moore could always find the best source of light.

Alongside the studios, the grounds also include:

- Hoglands – the artist's restored home.
- The Aisled Barn – a sixteenth-century timber-framed barn, which has been converted to display nine large tapestries produced by Moore and skilled weavers from West Dean Studio.
- Sheep Field Barn – a gallery space with changing exhibitions, which is currently being refurbished to add an educational workshop space.
- The Henry Moore Archive – a modern archive purpose-built to contain over 750,000 objects and documents relating to Moore, dating back to 1914.
Perry Green Studios & Gardens

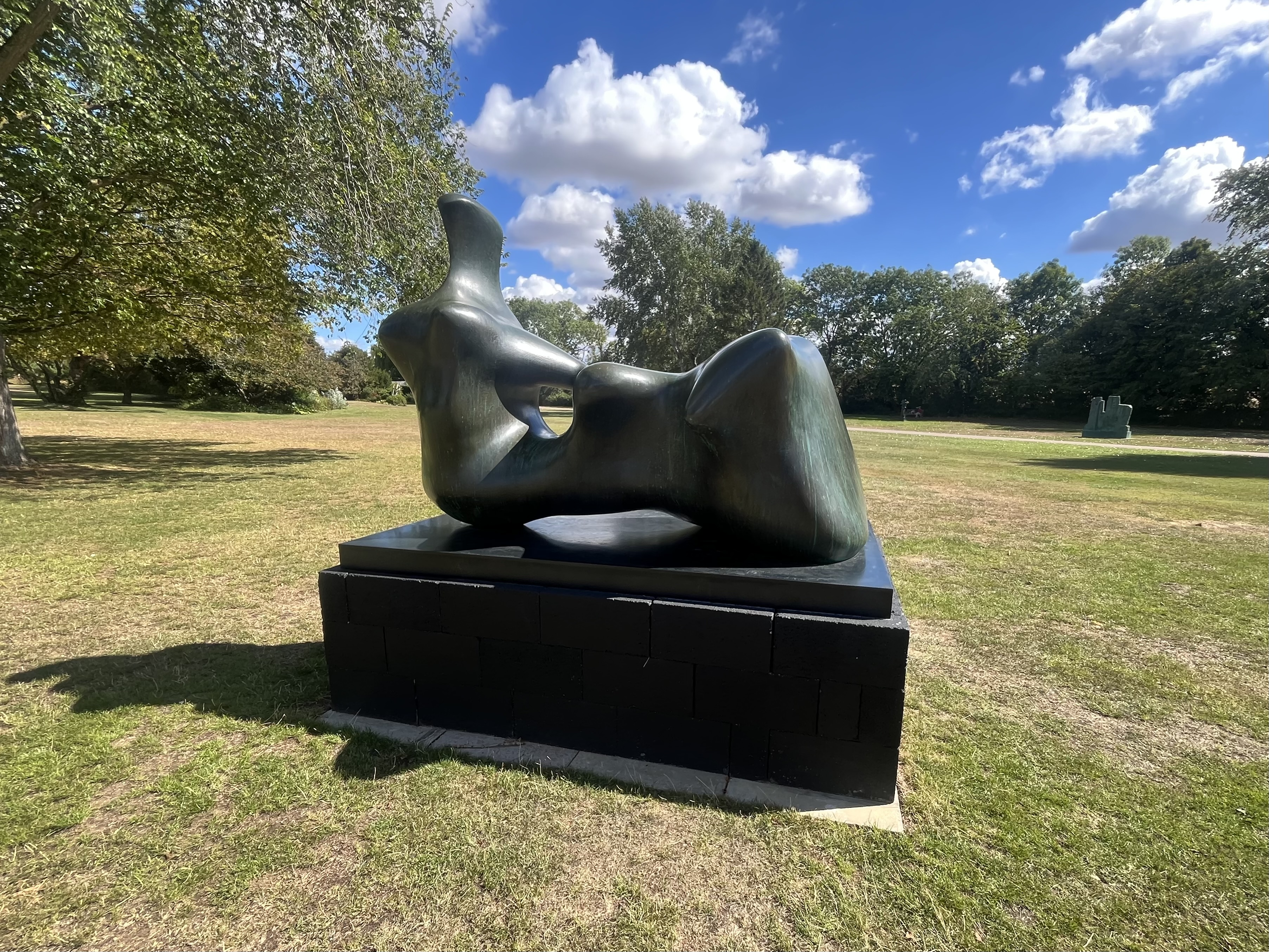
Reclining Figure - Hand

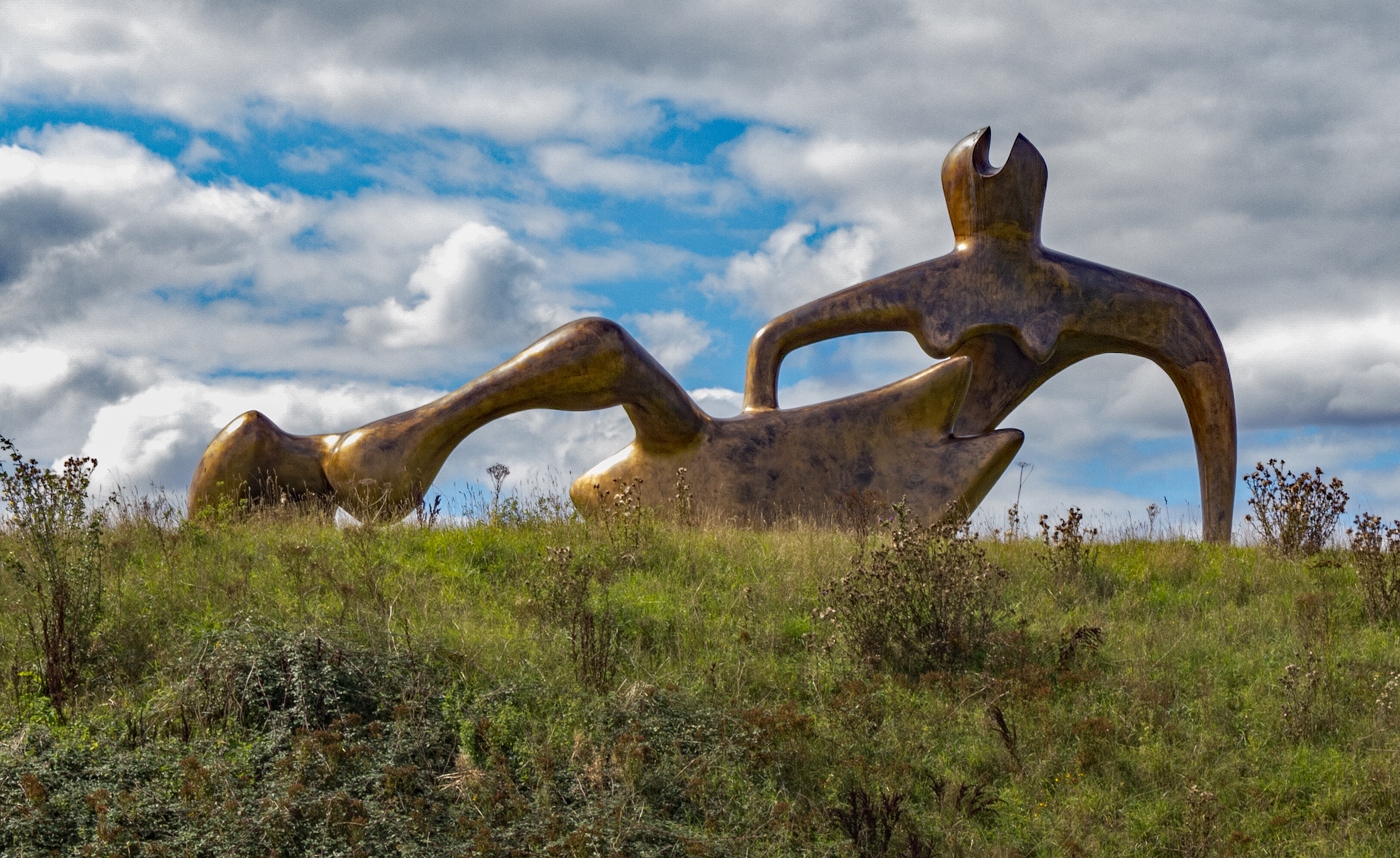
Large Reclining Figure

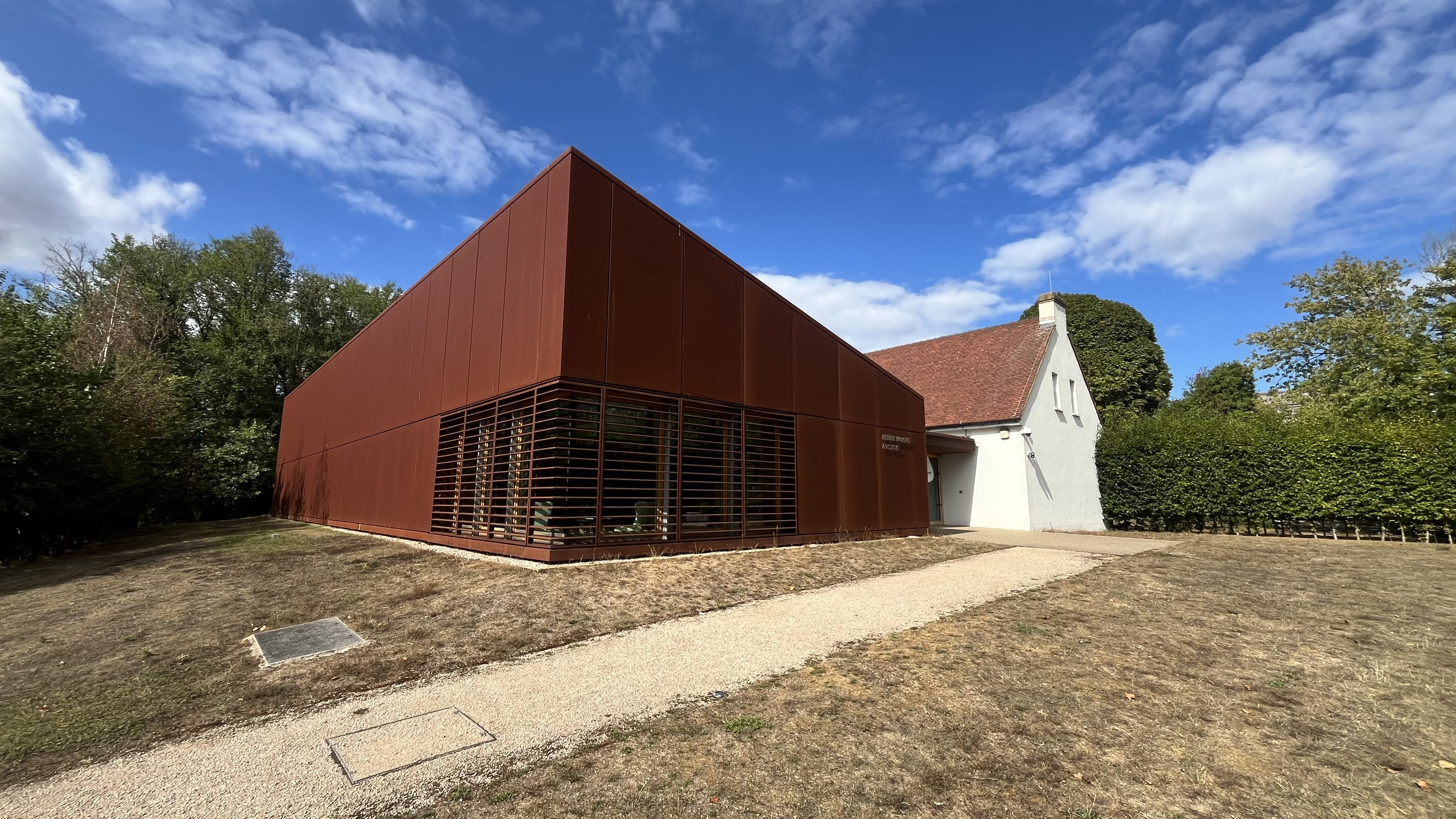
Henry Moore Archives

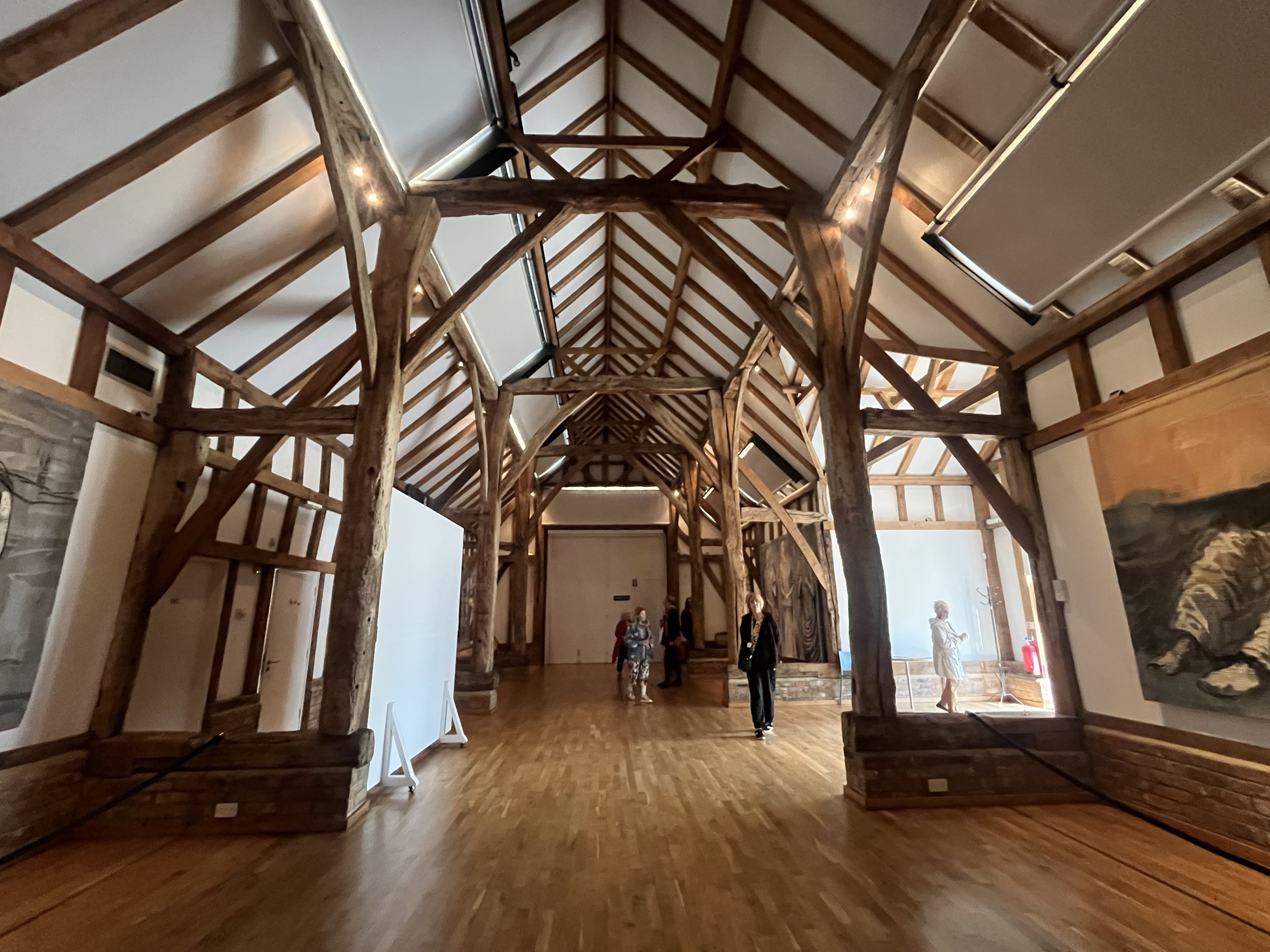
The Aisled Barn

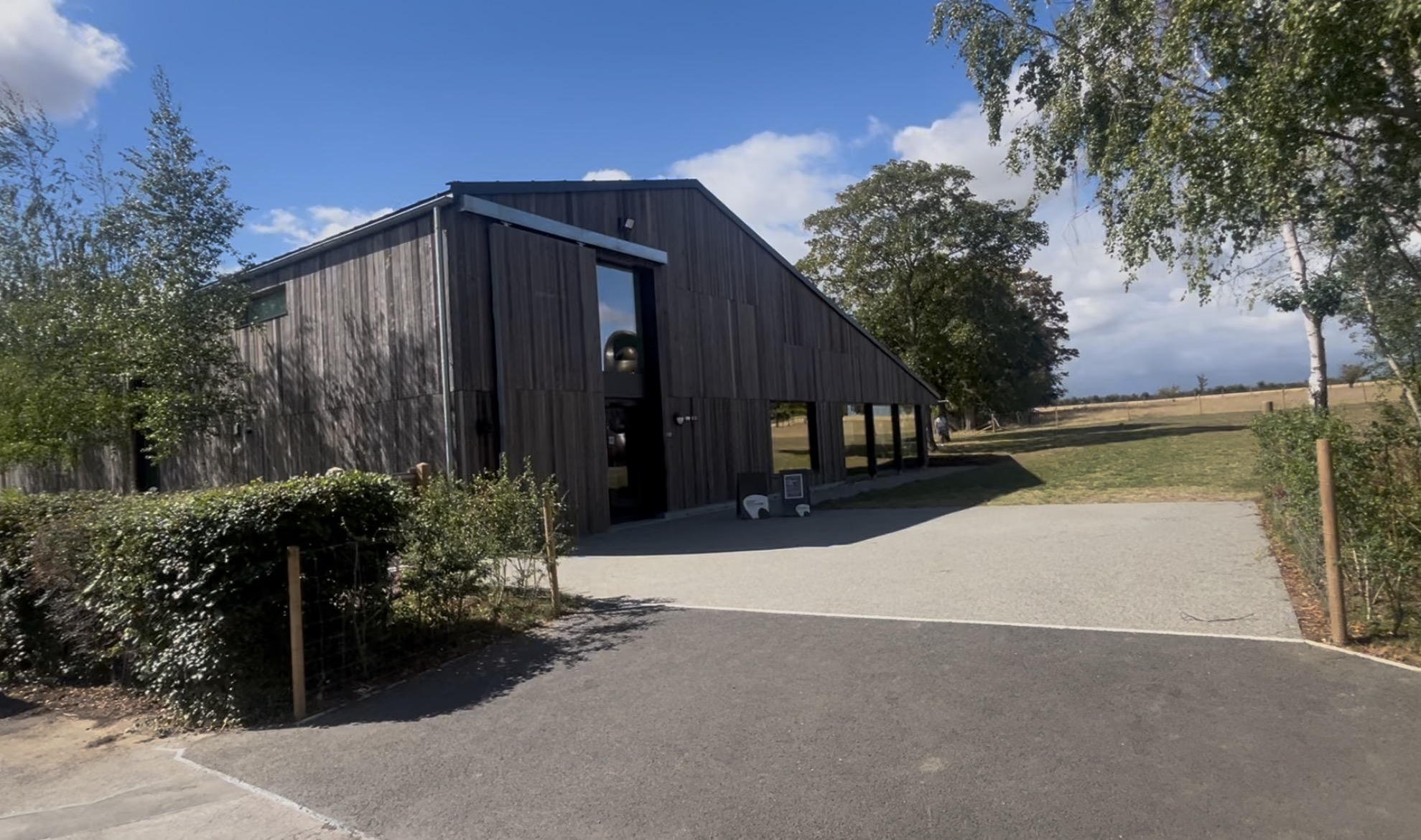
Sheep Field Barn

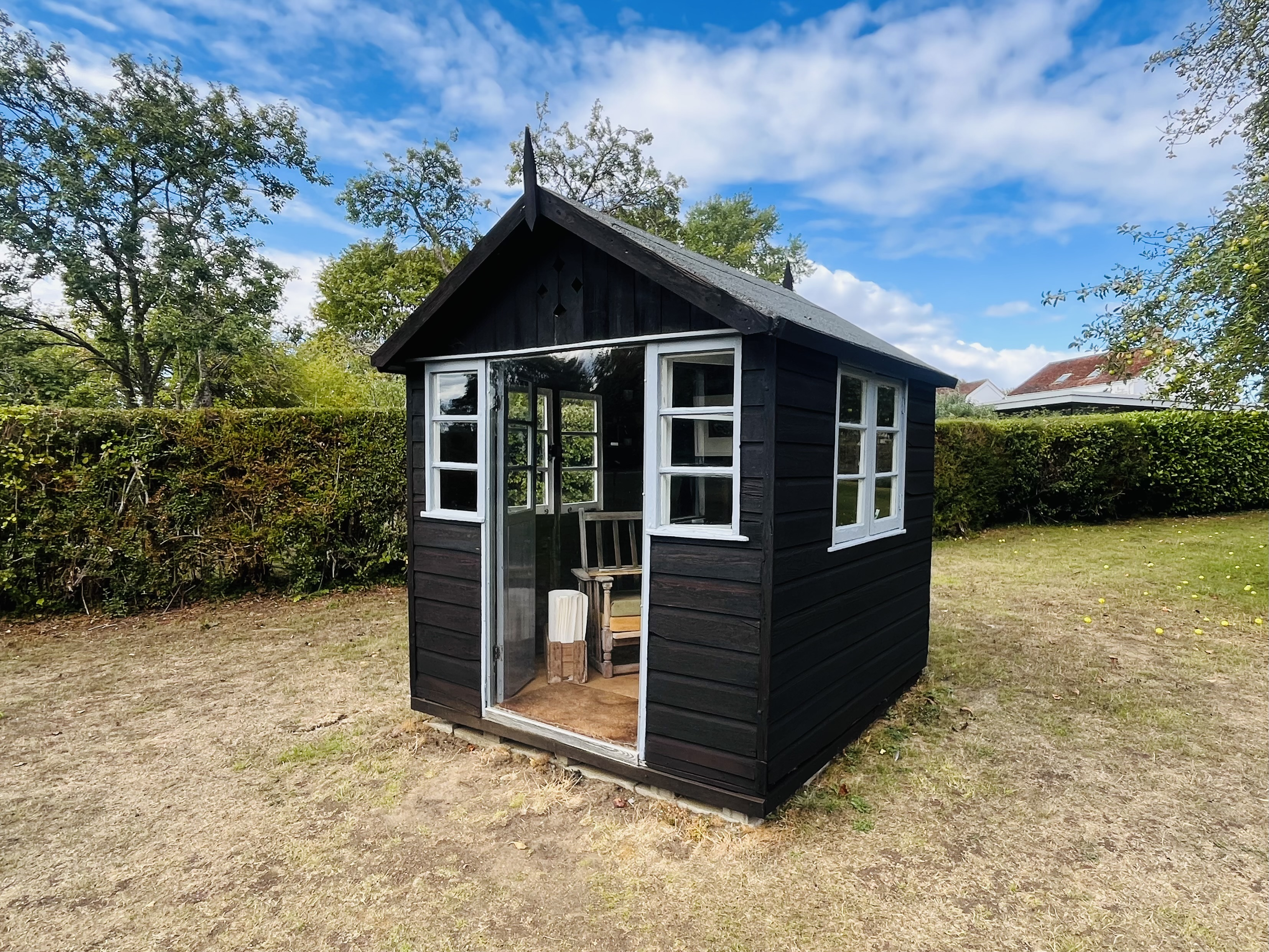
Moore's summer house

== Collection of Henry Moore's work ==
The Foundation holds around 15,000 works by Henry Moore in its collection at Perry Green, including monumental sculpture, maquettes and working models, drawings, prints, tapestries, textiles, graphic work and sketchbooks.

The Henry Moore Archive contains over 750,000 objects, including books and publications, letters and documents, clothing, exhibition posters, photography, film and audio recordings, and preparatory materials such as found objects.

The Foundation is active in loaning works and touring exhibitions both nationally and internationally.

== Henry Moore Institute, Leeds ==
Henry Moore Institute, Leeds
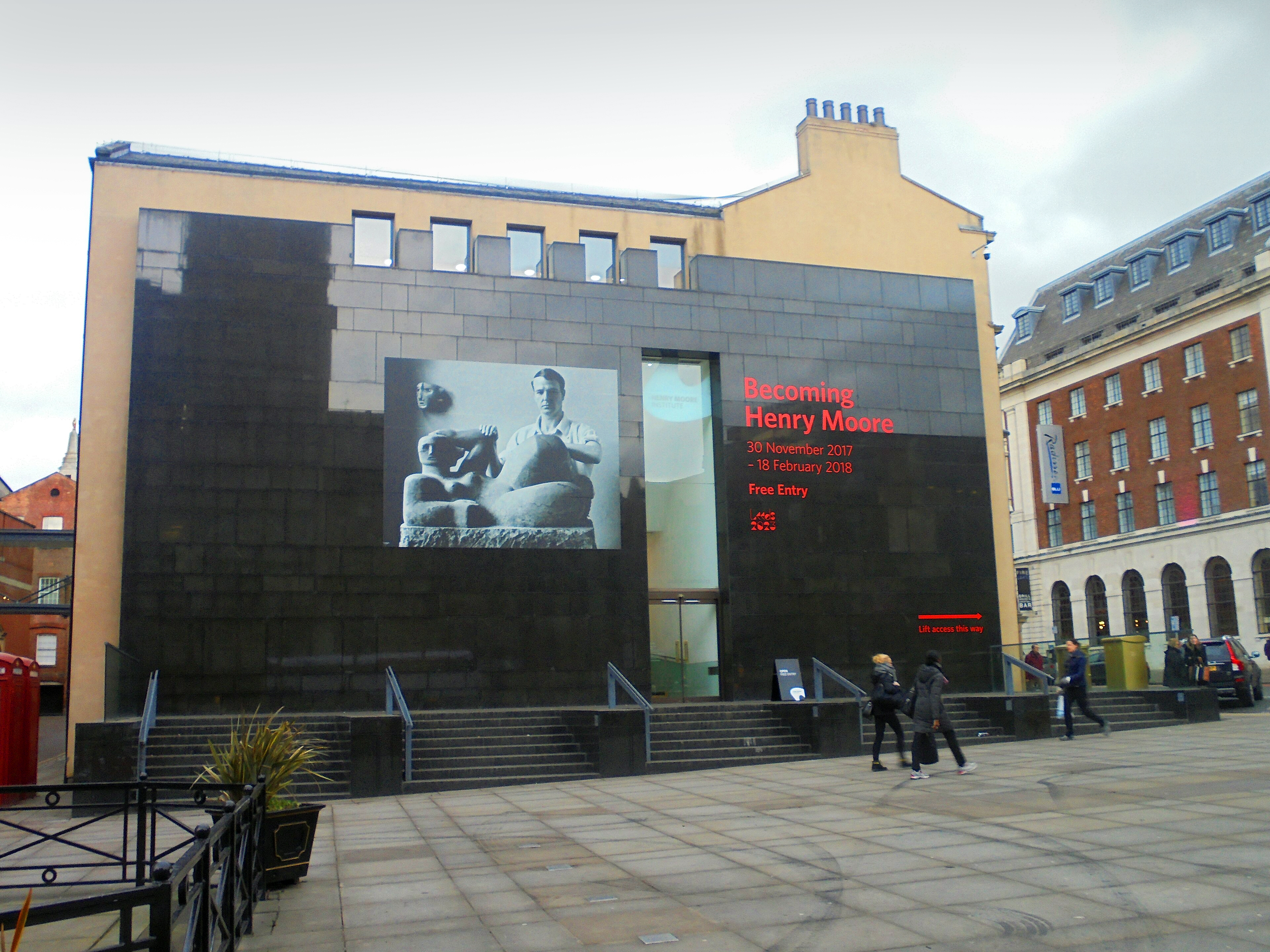
- The Leeds Institute

- Henry Moore Institute location
- Location: 74 The Headrow, Leeds LS1 3AH
- Coordinates: 53.800086°N 1.547993°W
- Type: Art museum
- Website: henry-moore.org/henry-moore-institute

The Henry Moore Institute is a centre for the study of sculpture in Leeds, located next door to Leeds Art Gallery on The Headrow. The Institute opened to the public on 22 April 1993. It is housed in a grade II listed building, converted from three former wool merchants' offices and designed by architects Jeremy Dixon and Edward Jones. It is connected via a bridge to Leeds Art Gallery. Admission is free.

=== Background ===
The Institute was born out of an earlier partnership between the Foundation and Leeds Art Gallery in 1982, which led to the creation of the Henry Moore Centre for the Study of Sculpture within Leeds City Art Gallery. In 1988, the Foundation established the Henry Moore Sculpture Trust as a 'public face' of the Foundation, which operated out of a basement room in Leeds City Art Gallery. In the following year, the Trust opened the Henry Moore Studio in Dean Clough, designed to give opportunities to contemporary artists. The Henry Moore Studio closed in 1999, at which time the Henry Moore Sculpture Trust and the Henry Moore Foundation amalgamated under the Foundation's name.

=== Public operations ===
The Institute operates a changing programme of mainly sculptural exhibitions, and also features a research library and an archive of sculptors' papers and ephemera. Staff at the Institute are also responsible for administering the sculpture collections of the neighbouring Leeds Art Gallery. The Institute hosts seasonal programmes of events, based on current exhibitions or other research interests, including lectures, seminars, conferences and practical workshops.

In 2023 the Institute underwent refurbishment in order to provide a dedicated education space. It reopened in summer 2024.

== Grant giving ==
The Foundation supports the growth and development of sculpture through grants to museums, galleries and individual art historians and researchers.

== 2005 sculpture theft ==
Reclining Figure 1969–70, a bronze sculpture, was stolen from the Foundation at Henry Moore Studios & Gardens on 15 December 2005. Thieves are believed to have lifted the 3.6 m by 2 m by 2 m, 2.1-tonne statue onto the back of a Mercedes lorry using a crane. Police investigating the theft believe it could have been stolen for scrap value.

== See also ==
- List of single-artist museums
