= Marc Potenza =

American psychiatrist

- Born: April 27, 1965 (age 61)

Academic background
- Education: BSc, MSc, Molecular Biochemistry and Biophysics, Yale University; MD, Yale University School of Medicine; PhD, Cell Biology, 1993, Yale University
- Thesis: Development of melanophore-based bioassays for the study of G protein coupled receptors (1993)

Academic work
- Institutions: Yale University School of Medicine
- Main interests: Addiction psychiatry

Marc Nicholas Potenza (born April 27, 1965) is an American psychiatrist who specializes in addiction psychiatry. He is Professor of Psychiatry, Child Study and Neurobiology at the Yale University School of Medicine, where he also serves as director of the Problem Gambling Clinic and the Center of Excellence in Gambling Research. He is also the director of the Women and Addictive Disorders Core of Women's Health Research and the Program for Research on Impulsivity and Impulse Control Disorders, both at Yale University.

== Early life and education ==
Potenza was born on April 27, 1965. He completed his medical degree at the Yale University School of Medicine along with his fellowship, residency, and PhD. In the fourth year of his residency at Yale, Potenza received a grant from the National Alliance for Research on Schizophrenia and Depression to study the link between the response to stress and the onset of mental illnesses.

== Career ==
Upon completing his formal education at Yale, Potenza joined the Department of Psychiatry as an assistant professor of psychiatry and schizophrenia. In this role, he was appointed the director of the Problem Gambling Clinic and the Women and Addictive Disorders Core of Women's Health Research at Yale. In 2003, Potenza worked alongside Marvin Steinberg to publish the first neuroimaging study of individuals with gambling disorders. Potenza was eventually promoted to associate professor as he began studying the differences in the brain of individuals suffering from addictive habits compared to the healthy population. His research soon developed into understanding which drugs worked as a potential treatment for problem gambling. He has also worked closely with Steinberg and others to develop an assessment instrument for diagnosing individuals with gambling disorder and to understand youth and adult problem gambling behaviors in Connecticut. As such, Potenza was named the Director of the newly created Center of Excellence in Gambling Research in 2009. the Center was reaffirmed of its status in 2013 and gained more funding.

In 2016, Potenza was named the recipient of the Lifetime Research Award from the National Council on Problem Gambling. He was later honored by the Society for the Advancement of Sexual Health and by the Turkish Green Crescent Society for his research work on addictions. In 2018, Potenza received the Marvin A. Steinberg Lifetime Achievement Award from the Connecticut Council on Problem Gambling. The following year, he received an honorary professorship from Eotvos Lorand University in Budapest. During the COVID-19 pandemic, Potenza continued to study the habits of those with gambling addictions. In September 2020, Potenza was named the Director of Division on Addictions Research at Yale. He was also recognized by Expertscape as being among the world’s top experts in binge-eating disorder.
