= Van 't Hof =

Van 't Hof and Van 't Hoff are Dutch toponymic surnames meaning "from the homestead". Other variants are Van Hoff, Van den Hof, Van der Hoff, Van't Hof and Vanthof. Notable people with these surnames include:

Van 't Hof / Van't Hof

- Erik Van't Hof (born 1960), Dutch-born American tennis player
- Jasper van 't Hof (born 1947), Dutch jazz pianist and keyboard-player
- Kaes Van't Hof (born 1986), American tennis player
- Robert Van't Hof (born 1959), American tennis player

Van 't Hoff

- Dilano van 't Hoff (2004–2023), Dutch racing driver
- Ernst van 't Hoff (1908–1955), Dutch jazz pianist and bandleader
- Jacobus Henricus van 't Hoff (1852–1911), Dutch physical chemist and Nobel Prize laureate
  - among others known for the van 't Hoff equation, van 't Hoff factor and Le Bel-van't Hoff rule
- Robert van 't Hoff (1887–1979), Dutch architect and furniture designer

Van der Hoff

- Dirk Van der Hoff (1814–1891), Dutch-born South African Protestant minister
- Frans van der Hoff (born 1939), Dutch missionary who launched the first Fairtrade label
- Ron van der Hoff (born 1978), Dutch archer

Van Hoff

- Arthur van Hoff (born 1963), Dutch computer scientist and businessman
- Nestor Nielsen van Hoff (born 1972), Uruguayan show jumping rider

Vanthof

- John Vanthof (born 1963), Canadian (Ontario) politician

== See also ==
- van't Hoff (crater), a lunar crater named for Jacobus Henricus van 't Hoff
- Gerard 't Hooft
- Hof (surname)
- Hoff (surname)
- von Hoff surname
