= Ólafur Daníelsson =

Icelandic mathematician (1877–1957)

Ólafur Dan Daníelsson (31 October 1877 – 10 December 1957) was an Icelandic mathematician. He was the first Icelandic mathematician to complete a doctoral degree. He was also the founder of the Icelandic Mathematical Society.

== Life ==
=== Early life and education ===
Danielsson was born in Viðvík in Viðvíkursveit in Skagafjördur. In 1897, he finished his secondary education in Reykjavík, and in the same year, went to study mathematics in the University of Copenhagen. Hieronymus Georg Zeuthen and Julius Petersen were his university tutors. In 1900, his first scientific paper was published in the Danish journal Nyt Tidsskrift for Matematik B. In 1901, he was awarded a gold medal for his mathematical treatise at the University of Copenhagen. In 1904, he was awarded a master's degree, which enabled him to teach in Danish high schools.

Returning to Iceland, he applied to be a mathematics teacher at Reykjavik Junior College, where he had studied a few years previously. However, he did not get the job. The successful applicant was an engineer, Sigurður Thoroddsen.

He started undertaking PhD research. His thesis built upon the earlier works of Zeuthen and other scientists, such as Rudolph Clebsch, Guido Castelnuevo and Luigi Cremona. In 1909, he submitted his thesis and graduated from the University of Copenhagen. He was the first Icelandic mathematician to be awarded a doctorate.

=== Career ===
He became a private tutor and began writing textbooks. In 1906, his first textbook, Reikningsbók/Arithmetic, was published. In 1908, he became the first mathematics teacher in the Iceland Teacher College when it was first established. The students were experienced teachers, but had been lacking formal education themselves. In 1914, his textbook Arithmetic (Reikningsbók) was republished for the students' needs.

In 1919, a mathematics stream at Reykjavík Junior College was founded in response to Danielsson's and his friends' initiative. He was tasked with its development, with the goal of enabling students to attend the Polytechnic College in Copenhagen and to pursue university studies in sciences. Prior to that, students needed to spend a preparatory year abroad.

At the same time, Danielsson started writing high school mathematics textbooks. In 1920s, his 4 textbooks were republished, including a rewritten version of the Arithmetic book. Additionally, three new subjects were introduced in Icelandic: Um flatarmyndir/On plane geometry, Kenslubók í hornafræði/Trigonometry, and Kenslubók í algebru/A textbook in algebra. These three textbooks were groundbreaking, being the first of their kind in Icelandic. They were adopted for use at Reykjavík High School, along with the advanced Danish textbooks. Later, when Akureyri High School was established in 1930, these textbooks were also incorporated into its curriculum. The mathematician Sigurdur Helgason commented that, "The geometry textbooks by the remarkable mathematician Ólafur Daníelsson, the pioneering founder of mathematics education in Iceland, were written by a man with a real mission".

In 1941, Daníelsson concluded his teaching career and retired. His remarkable influence extended over almost seven decades, starting in 1906 when he published his initial textbook and continuing in 1908 when he commenced teaching at Iceland's Teacher College. His significant impact on mathematics education persisted until 1976 when his textbooks were excluded from the reading list of the national entrance examination. There is no doubt about his enduring legacy as a devoted mathematician, as his visionary approach helped shape mathematics education in Iceland.

== Research ==
In the 1920s, Daníelsson dedicated himself to advancing the field of algebraic geometry through his research. He actively participated in the Scandinavian Congress of Mathematicians held in 1925 and 1927. His contributions were instrumental in fostering the development of mathematics in Iceland, which ultimately led to Iceland becoming a full member of the Nordic Congress of Mathematicians in the 1980s.

He published several papers in the Danish Matematisk Tidsskrift, with notable contributions in the years 1926, 1940, 1945, and 1948. His research work also appeared in esteemed journals such as Mathematische Annalen, specifically in volumes 102 (1930), 109 (1934), 113 (1937), and 114 (1937).

In 1925, Daníelsson participated in the Sixth Scandinavian Congress of Mathematicians held in Copenhagen. Two years later, in 1927, he also attended the seventh congress held in Oslo. He delivered presentations at both congresses, accompanied by the publication of his papers. His first paper, titled "En Lösning af Malfattis problem" [A solution of Malfatti's Problem], was published in Matematisk Tidsskrift. Subsequently, he contributed to Matematische Annalen with a paper entitled "Überkorrespondierende Punkte der Steinerschen Fläche vierter Ordnung und die Hauptpunkte derselben" (Corresponding Points of Steiner's Surface of Fourth Order and their Principal Points). This journal featured the works of renowned mathematicians such as Einstein, van der Waerden, von Neumann, Landau, Ore, and Kolmogorov, among others, and Daníelsson's paper was among the 44 articles published. It is worth noting that Danielsson was the only mathematician from Iceland contributing to Scandinavian mathematical journals before the second world war.

Daníelsson's fascination with elementary geometry was evident, as he remarked that "it is difficult to find tasks simpler and more elegant than skillful mathematical problems." His final paper was published in both the Journal of the Icelandic Society of Engineers in 1946 and Matematisk Tidsskrift in 1948.

== The Icelandic Mathematical Society ==
On 31 October 1947, the Icelandic Mathematical Society was founded in Reykjavik when Daníelsson was 70. The society records:

“On Friday, 31 October 1947, which was the seventieth birthday of Ólafur Daníelsson, he gathered in his home several men and set up a Society. The purpose of the Society is to promote co-operation and promotion of people in Iceland who have completed a university degree in a mathematical subject. The Society holds meetings at which individual members explain their mathematical topics and, if desired, discussions on the topic will be conducted.”

The first lecture was delivered by Ólafur Daníelsson himself. He spoke "about the circle transcribed by the outer circumference of the triangle" and calculated its length relative to the radius of the inscribed circle and the circumference of the triangle. This result has been published in the Matematisk Tidsskrift. However, this had been a longstanding interest of him, as the initial foundations of this subject could be traced back to an article he wrote in 1900, published in the same journal. In this regard, the topic itself carried a sense of antiquity, yet it had recently witnessed a fresh comprehension shortly before his presentation.
