= Sleitu-Björn Hróarsson =

Ninth century Icelandic settler

- Born: c. 890
- Known for: Settling Skagafjörður, Iceland
- Spouse: Þuríður Steinólfsdóttir
- Children: Arnbjörn Björnsson, Arnfríður Björnsdóttir, Örnólfur Björnsson, Arnoddur Björnsson, Sigríður Björnsdóttir, Þjóðrekur Björnsson

Sleitu-Björn Hróarsson (born c. 890 - date of death unknown) was a viking chief and the first to found a settlement in Skagafjörður, Iceland in the ninth century. It was one of the largest settlements of this period, spanning from the Gljúfurá river (Grjótá in the Landnámabók) through half of Viðvíkursveit, Hjaltadalur, Kolbeinsdalur, and Óslandshlíð, and part of Höfðaströnd and Deildardalur. Later on, three more settlers joined him: Öndóttur, Kolbeinn Sigmundarson, and Hjalti Þórðarson. Sleitu-Björn divided part of the settlement and his estate was founded in Sleitustaðir.

There is a historical controversy in which various researchers believe that Sleitu-Björn is the same person as Sléttu-Björn, a colonist who settled in Saurbær, Dalasýsla who abandoned his settlement in Skagafjörður to relocate to the west. However, others maintain, either based on his list of descendants and the sagas, that these are two different people. Sléttu-Björn also appears in the Gull-Þóris saga.

== Legacy ==
The name of Sleitu-Björn's first wife is unknown, but he had at least five children:

- Arnbjörn Björnsson (born 890), mentioned in the Laxdæla saga. Arnbjörn would become the father of Þuríður, wife of Þorleikur Höskuldsson and mother of Bolli Þorleiksson.
- Arnfríður Björnsdóttir (born 924).
- Örnólfur Björnsson (born 928).
- Arnoddur Björnsson (born 934), appears as a character in the Víga-Glúms saga.
- Sigríður Björnsdóttir (born 936), became the wife of Þorkell Þorbjörnsson.

He had a second marriage with Þuríður Steinólfsdóttir (born 895), daughter of Steinólfur lági Hrólfsson. Their son was Þjóðrekur Björnsson.
