= Hólahreppur =

Former municipality in Skagafjörður, Iceland

- Hreppur
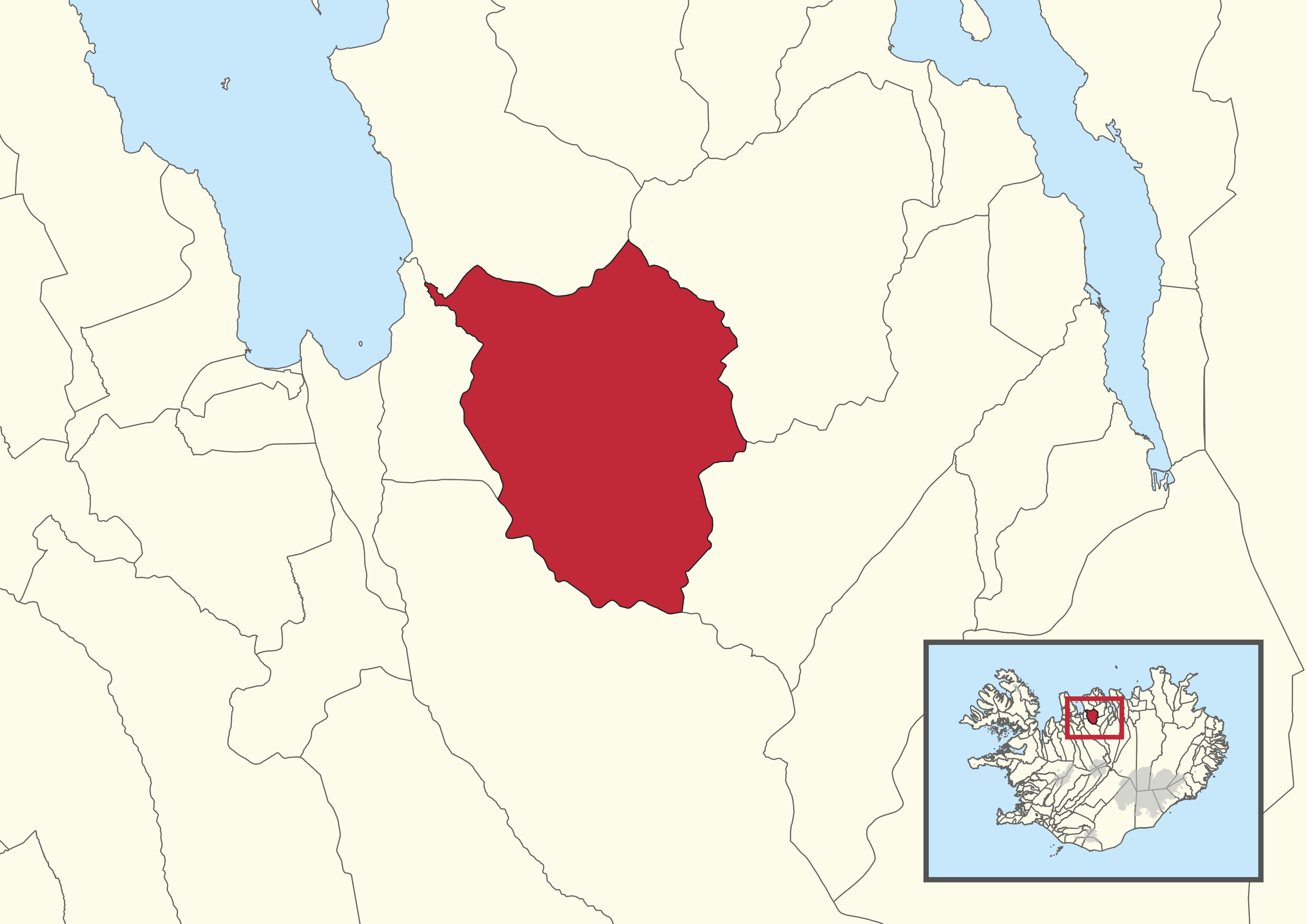
- Hólahreppur
- Country: Iceland
- County: Skagafjörður
- Unification of Skagafjörður (municipality): June 6, 1998
- Named for: The town of Hólar
- Towns: List: Hólar, Skúfsstaðir, Skriðuland, Sleitustaðir, Kálfsstaðir, Neðri-Ás, Hrafnhóll, Laufskálar
- Time zone: UTC+0

Hólahreppur was a hreppur, an old Icelandic municipality, in the east of Skagafjörður County, Iceland. It was named after the old bishop's residence, Hólar, in Hjaltadalur.

Hólahreppur consisted of two inhabited valleys: Hjaltadalur and Kolbeinsdalur, the latter of which has predominantly become deserted.

On June 6, 1998, Hólahreppur joined ten other local governments to form Skagafjörður county: Skefilsstaðahreppur, Sauðárkrókur, Skarðshreppur, Staðarhreppur, Seyluhreppur, Lýtingsstaðahreppur, Rípurhreppur, Viðvíkurhreppur, Hofshreppur, and Fljótahreppur.

== Hreppur council ==
The last Hólahreppur council was elected in the hreppur committee election on May 28, 1994, in which Bryndís Bjarnadóttir, Einar Svansson, Gunnar Guðmundsson, Sverrir Magnússon, and Valgeir Bjarnason were voted into office.

=== Council chairs ===
- 1874–1876 Kristján Kjærnested in Hólar
- 1876–1878 Jón Tómasson in Hólar
- 1878–1881 Jón Ásgrímsson in Skúfsstaðir
- 1881–1885 Sigurður Gunnlaugsson in Skriðuland
- 1885–1886 Magnús Ásgrímsson in Sleitustaðir
- 1886–1889 Jón Sigurðsson in Skúfsstaðir
- 1889–1892 Árni Ásgrímsson in Kálfsstaðir
- 1892–1910 Jón Sigurðsson in Skúfsstaðir
- 1910–1916 (Geirfinnur) Trausti Friðfinnsson in Hólar
- 1916–1922 Árni Árnason in Kálfsstaðir
- 1922–1928 Páll Zóphóníasson in Hólar
- 1928–1934 Steinn Stefánsson in Neðri-Ás
- 1934–1962 Friðbjörn Traustason in Hólar
- 1962–1963 Páll Sigurðsson in Hof I
- 1963–1980 Guðmundur Stefánsson in Hrafnhóll
- 1980–1982 Trausti Pálsson in Laufskálar
- 1982–1990 Hörður Jónsson in Hof II
- 1990–1994 Trausti Pálsson in Hólar
- 1994–1998 Valgeir Bjarnason in Hólar
