= Hólar University College =

Icelandic university

Coordinates: 65.7336°N 19.1135°W

Hólar University
- Hólaskóli - Háskólinn á Hólum
- Type: Public
- Established: 1106 / 1882 / 2007
- Rector: Erla Björk Örnólfsdóttir
- Location: Hólar, Iceland
- Campus: Rural
- Colors: Maroon and Gold
- Nickname: Hólaskóli
- Website: www.holar.is

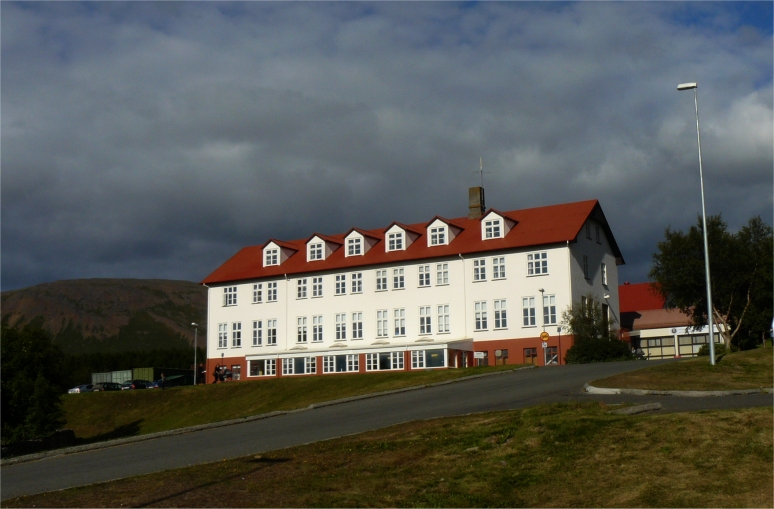
Hólar University College

Hólar University is located in Hólar, Iceland, an important historical centre of education. The university was the first post-secondary school in Hólar, founded in 1106. It was renamed Hólar Agricultural College in 1882 and became Hólar University in 2007. Established in the 12th century, Hólar is one of the oldest universities in Europe; the oldest is University of Bologna since 1088 AD.

== History ==
Hólar in Hjaltadalur has a long history of schools and education. Bishop Jón Ögmundsson's cathedral school was founded in 1106 AD, and after the Reformation in 1550 AD, the school was converted to a Latin school that remained in operation until 1801. In 1882, an agricultural school was established at Hólar, and Hólar University College traces its roots to that institution. During the past 15 years, the school at Hólar has developed from a conventional agricultural school to a modern university-level institution.

=== Architecture ===
The campus has architectural examples from throughout the history of Iceland, from traditional turf houses to the present, and the school has a policy of safeguarding this heritage through sustainable use. The main building, which houses the Department of Tourism, is the work of two of the first architects in Iceland. Hólar Cathedral, consecrated in 1763, is among most important architectural landmarks in Iceland.

=== Early settlement ===
Although Hólar is not mentioned in the Icelandic sagas, it is thought that it was settled by people from the early settlement of Hof, which is about 2,5 km south of Hólar. Hof, which is mentioned in the sagas, was settled by Hjalti Þórðarson, whose sons became famous for their generosity and gallantry. The story tells that when they buried their father they gave the largest known burial feast in heathen times. Twelve hundred guests were invited and after the feast all men of distinction were sent on their way with valuable gifts. There is no doubt that their nobility and that of their descendants helped establish the fame and prosperity of Hólar.

In the middle of the eleventh century Oxi Hjaltason, a kinsman of the Hof family who lived in Hólar, built a great church there. Around the year 1100, Hólar was owned by Illugi Bjarnason. When a bishop's seat was established in northern Iceland, gave Hólar to the Church for that purpose.

=== Bishop's seat and the bishops ===
During the Catholic times, Hólar accumulated great wealth and was densely populated. During the peak of the bishop's seat era, Hólar owned 352 estates that accounted for about a quarter of all the estates in the north of the country. Apart from that it enjoyed the privilege of driftwood (a valuable resource) along with rights to other advantages in several surrounding areas. The first printing press in Iceland was installed here around 1530 and Hólar was the last stronghold of the Catholic Church during the Reformation. The present cathedral, consecrated in 1763, is the oldest stone church in Iceland.

Hólar remained a bishop's seat for almost seven centuries from 1106 until 1802 when Hólar was sold. During that era Hólar was the true centre of northern Iceland and one of the major cultural centres of the area. This status was partly due to the school that was around there for most of this time. Of the thirty six bishops who resided at Hólar, twenty three were Catholic and thirteen Lutheran. Many of these have left their mark in Icelandic history. Among the most well known are Jón Ögmundsson, the Sacred (1106-1121), Guðmundur Arason the Good (1203-1237), Jón Arason (1524-1550) and Guðbrandur Þorláksson (1571-1627).

The first bishop in Hólar was Jón Ögmundsson the Sacred, who was ordained in 1106. He established and ran a seminary at Hólar and became very well known for this as well as his management of the church. The commonly used phrase "heim að Hólum" or "back home to Hólar" dates back to him. Guðmundur Arason the Good was famous for his rivalry with some of the most respected chieftains in northern Iceland. Guðmundur went on to lead a band of followers in what became a semi vagrant life.

Jón Arason was the last Catholic bishop, he fought strongly against the Reformation and was finally beheaded along with his two sons in Skálholt in November 1550, and the resistance against the Reformation came to an end. Jón was a well known poet and it was he who brought the first printing press to Iceland in around 1530.

Guðbrandur Þorláksson was famous for his active book publishing, among of them was the first translation of the Bible into Icelandic, which was printed in 1584. The printing of this Bible is thought to have played a crucial role in the preservation of the Icelandic language.

Hólar became a vicarage after the bishop's seat was abolished until 1861 when the vicarage was moved to Viðvík. In 1952 Hólar was re- established as a vicarage and in 1986 it became the residence of the ordained bishop of the Hólar benefice. The present bishop at Hólar is Solveig Lara Guðmundsdóttir.

=== Cathedral school - Latin school - Agricultural school - University ===
Hólar in Hjaltadalur has a long history of schools and education. Bishop Jón Ögmundsson's cathedral school was founded in 1106, and after the Reformation in 1550 the school was converted to a Latin school that remained in operation until 1801. In 1882 an agricultural school was established at Hólar, and Hólar University College traces its roots to that institution. During the past 15 years, the school at Hólar has developed from a conventional agricultural school to a modern university-level institution. In 2003, the college was granted permission to graduate students with an undergraduate degree, and on 1 July 2007 Hólar University College formally commenced operations.

== Social ==
There is a beer club open on the grounds of the university.

=== Beer Club ===
The beer club, on the grounds of Hólar University College, is not hard to find. The tiny club, housed in a former cow shed, is part dorm-room, part man-cave, but scrubbed clean. The annual membership fee is 5,000 krónur (US$40) a year. It started out as a club for faculty and students, but is now open to the public. They keep a notebook with tabs on who drinks what, and members get beer at a discounted price. It is a beer club and not a bar because "there is no pub culture in Iceland" - Guðmundur. He also states that the club pools its resources so they can buy cases of great beer from around the world that otherwise wouldn't be available to them. The beer offerings are impressive for such a small place, and for northern Iceland. They also make their own brew on occasion. The brewmaster—the college's IT guy—gets the yeast from Germany or Belgium. “We need to add minerals to the water because the water is so pure here it is dead, no taste,” said Guðmundur.

== Departments ==
There are three departments in the university.

=== Department of Aquaculture and Fish Biology ===
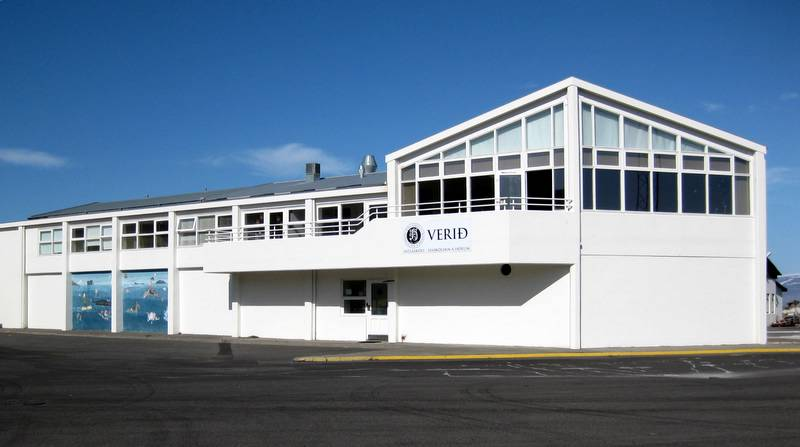
Verið - The main building for the Department of Aquaculture and Fish Biology. Located in Sauðárkrókur.

The objective of the Department of Aquaculture and Fish Biology is to gather and disseminate knowledge in the fields of aquatic biology, aquaculture, and fish biology. The department is an international centre for research, instruction, and continuing education in aquatic biology, aquaculture, and fish biology. The department promotes the professional development of aquaculture in the spirit of sustainable development.

The department approaches its objective through the integration of research and teaching, collaboration with other higher education institutions, connections with industry, and options for students to control their own studies.

=== Department of Equine Studies ===
The objective of the Equine Science Department is to provide professional education in the fields of horse breeding, horse training, horsemanship, as well as in teaching and coaching riding. Furthermore, the department works towards development and innovation within the field of equine science, through research activities. It also promotes increased profitability in the sector, the spread of equestrian activities, and the welfare of horses. The department is an international centre for education and research in the fields of horse breeding, horse training, horsemanship, and riding instructions.

Hólar College has a formal collaboration agreement with The Icelandic Horse Trainers Association regarding further development of the programs and quality control of the education provided by the college

=== Department of Tourism Studies ===
It is the department's mission to train students to be professionals and prepare them for active participation in policy making and development of the tourism sector and for research based graduate programs. The department provides the industry with well educated people who will improve the professionalism and quality of Icelandic tourist services.

This is achieved by two main emphases: An emphasis on teaching methods based on student involvement and training communication skills, analytical thinking and critical evaluation. Students are expected to participate in the on-line educational community in a professional manner, and they are expected to participate actively in the quality measures and course development. An emphasis is placed on providing practical education that leads to employment opportunities. Many of the courses have practical components. The diploma programs both have an extended practicum (15 and 30 ECTS respectively) where students are expected to be reflective practitioners in the field under supervision of faculty as well as a workplace mentor.

In the program offerings these aims are addressed by course offerings on four foundations of tourism: Infrastructure and development; Management, marketing and business skills; tourist experience – demand, expectations and experiences; Supply of services, events and products. Quality, sustainability and professionalism are the underlying principles of the programs. Each of those four streams offers both general courses as well as courses focused on more specific matters. Tourism is a very diverse sector and offers range of opportunities to engage in specialized fields. The aim of the diploma programs is to give the students a broad overview of the sector and insight in topics of relevance. Specific subjects are more common during the second half of the BA program, in particular with a focus on various types of niche tourism.

The programs progress from the general to the specific. The diploma programs open with an overview course; Tourism and Festivals and events, respectively. There the practicum and for the Event management, the final project are the in-depth, individual study components. The first year offers the overview and in years 2 and 3 more specific issues are raised and the demand for personal input and individual research increases.

== Living at Hólar ==
The community at Hólar has grown in tandem with the growth of Hólar University. The ecclesiastical site, community and farm-land at Hólar is operated by Hólar University, whose objective is to maintain the dignity and sanctity of the site. To that end, an ambitious environmental policy has been set.

The community at Hólar is small and close knit. The campus at Hólar in Hjaltadalur has excellent residential housing, both for individuals and for families. There is a primary school and a pre-school on campus, serving Hólar and the neighbouring rural area.

There are diverse opportunities for outdoor activities in the area. Hólar forest borders the campus so it is easy to walk, jog, or go cross-country skiing and there are various longer hiking trails in the immediate area. There is also a sports hall and swimming pool. Facilities for horse riding are excellent.

Most of the students and employees of Hólar University and other institutions located at Hólar live in the area. Hólar is a popular destination and tourist services are operated there in the summer months. At Hólar the cafeteria where students and employees can purchase lunch is operated year-round. There is also a beer club.

The nearest town and service centre is Sauðárkrókur, 30 km from Hólar. In the Sauðárkrókur campus there is a large dining room with a kitchen for students and employees, as well as easy access to the town shops and restaurants.

== See also ==
- Skemman.is (digital library)
