= Kolbeinsey =

Island of Iceland

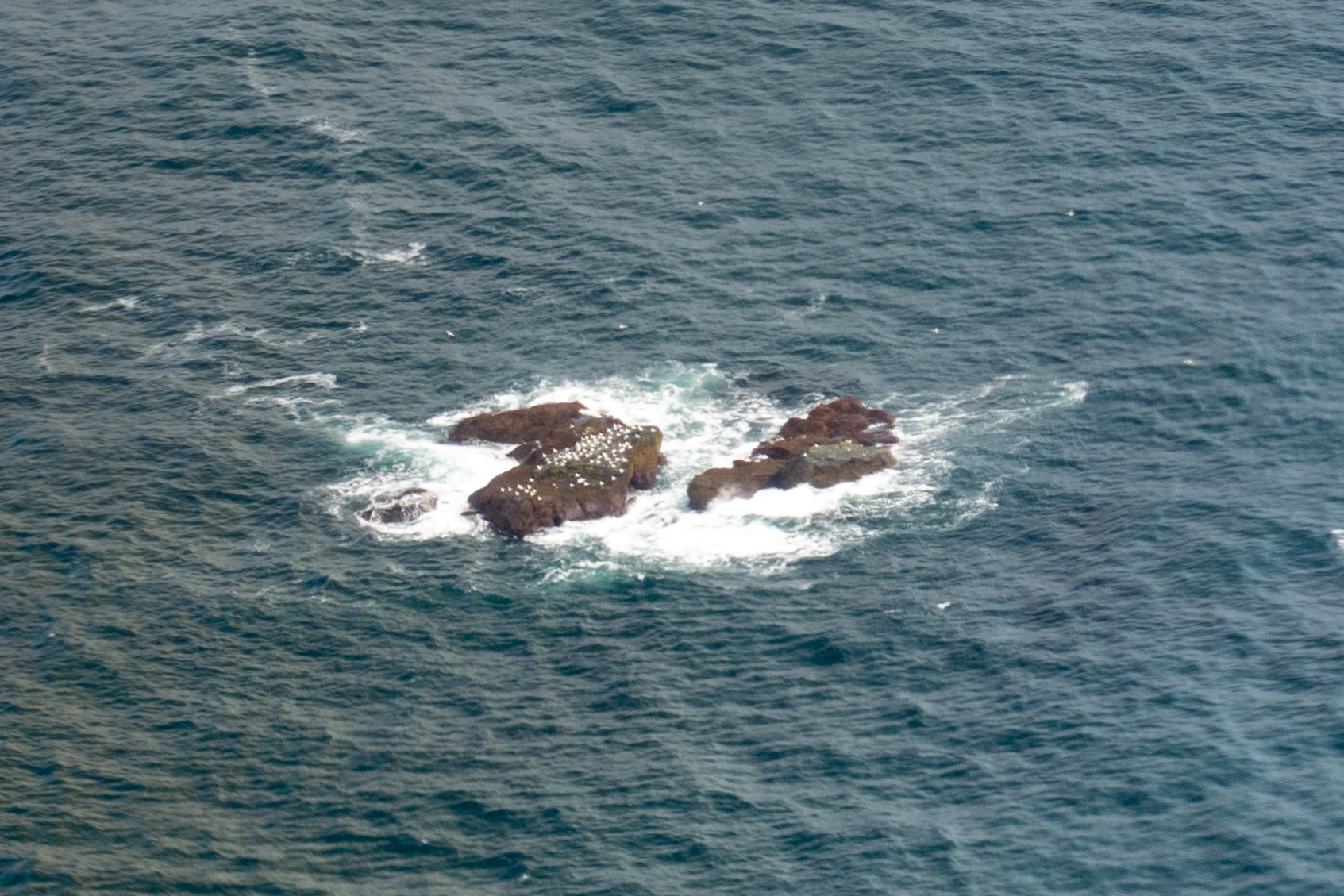
- Eroded remnants of the island in 2020

- Location within North Atlantic

Geography
- Location: Greenland Sea
- Coordinates: 67°09′02″N 18°41′01″W
- Length: 0.0145 km (0.00901 mi)
- Width: 0.02 km (0.012 mi)

Administration
- Iceland

Demographics
- Population: 0

Kolbeinsey (Icelandic: [ˈkʰɔlˌpeinsˌeiː]; also known as Kolbeinn's Isle, Seagull Rock, Mevenklint, Mevenklip, or Meeuw Steen) is a small Icelandic islet in the Greenland Sea located 105 kilometres (55 nautical miles) off the northern coast of Iceland, 74 km (40 nmi) north-northwest of the island of Grímsey. It is the northernmost point of Iceland and lies north of the Arctic Circle. The islet is named after Kolbeinn Sigmundarson, from Kolbeinsdalur in Skagafjörður, who according to Svarfdæla saga is said to have broken his ship there and died with his men.

A basalt landform, devoid of vegetation, Kolbeinsey is subject to rapid wave erosion and is expected to disappear in the near future. Erosion rate data from 1994 suggested that this would happen around 2020; however in 2020 the continued existence of the island was confirmed, with two skerries still visible at low tide. As of April 2021, two small skerries remained visible at low tide.

== History ==
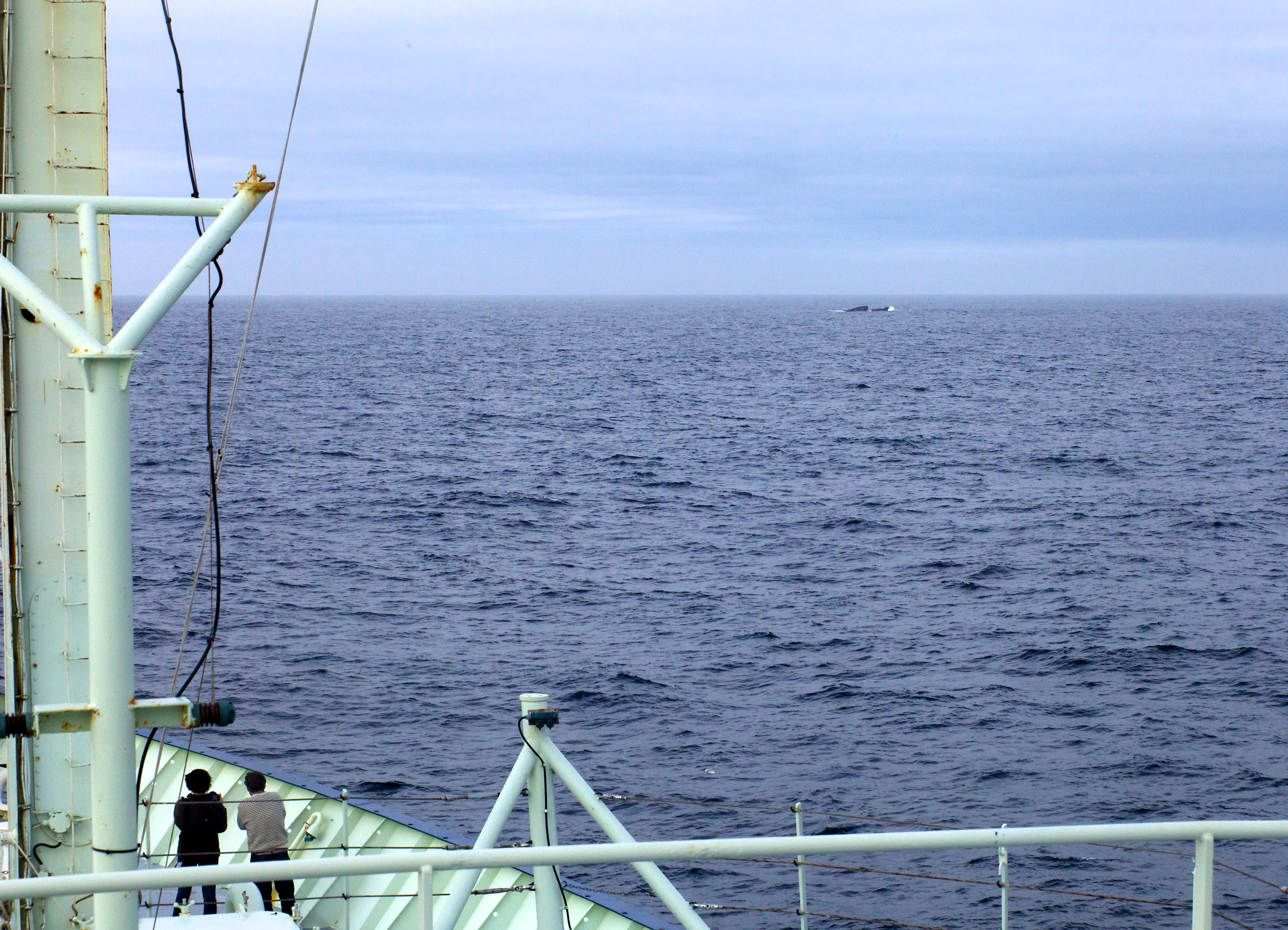
Kolbeinsey seen near the horizon from the deck of RV Knorr, 2011

The original size of Kolbeinsey is unknown. When it was first measured in 1616, the island was 700 metres (2,300 ft) in length from north to south and 100 m (330 ft) east to west. By 1903, it had already diminished to half that size. In August 1985, the island was recorded as being 39 m (128 ft) across. At the beginning of 2001, Kolbeinsey had been reduced to an area of 90 m^{2} (970 sq ft), corresponding to the size of a circle of about 10.7 m (35 ft 1 in) in diameter. The island had a maximum elevation of 8 m (26 ft).

In 1952, Iceland declared Kolbeinsey to be a baseline point for the purposes of defining its exclusive fishery limits, originally set at 4 nmi (7 km) from the baseline. Iceland would eventually declare a 200-nautical-mile (370 km) exclusive economic zone (EEZ) in 1975, using Kolbeinsey as the baseline point. Denmark (on behalf of Greenland) objected to the use of Kolbeinsey as a baseline point as doing so gave Iceland control over 9,400 km^{2} (2,700 sq nmi) of sea area that would otherwise belong to Greenland. A helipad was constructed in 1989 and further efforts to reinforce the island were discussed in the Icelandic parliament in the 1990s. However, an agreement was reached in 1997 between Iceland, Denmark and Greenland (which was a party to the agreement in its own capacity) that permanently fixed the EEZ boundary in the area, giving Iceland control over 30 percent of the disputed area, while Greenland would control the remaining 70 percent. Since that agreement, Kolbeinsey has not been relevant to the definition of EEZ boundaries and there were no further efforts to reinforce the island.

In March 2006, it was reported that helicopters were no longer able to land on Kolbeinsey. It had been found that almost a half of the helipad that was laid with concrete in 1989 had been destroyed when a large piece of rock separated from the rest of the island. In 2010, it was reported that the helipad had collapsed completely and that the island was now actually two skerries, separated by a gap of about 4 m (13 ft).

External videos
- Kolbeinsey mæld hátt og lágt – The Icelandic Coast Guard measuring Kolbeinsey in 2021

In an August 2020 video, Tom Scott, an English YouTuber, chartered a plane to confirm the continued existence of Kolbeinsey; the two skerries were still visible. In April 2021, the Icelandic Coast Guard visited the island and measured it as 20 metres (66 ft) wide from west to east and 14.5 metres (48 ft) long from north to south.

== Geology ==
A submarine eruption was reported in 1999 near the Kolbeinsey Ridge northwest of Grímsey. Kolbeinsey is the only subaerial expression of this portion of the Mid-Atlantic Ridge. It formed during the late-Pleistocene or Holocene. Dredged glass shards indicate submarine eruptive activity during the late-Pleistocene until at least 11,800 radiocarbon years ago.

== See also ==
- Extreme points of Iceland
- Geography of Iceland
- Geology of Iceland
- List of islands of Iceland
- Volcanism of Iceland
  - List of volcanic eruptions in Iceland
  - List of volcanoes in Iceland
