= Icelandic Mathematical Society =

Mathematical society in Iceland

- Íslenzka stærðfræðafélagið
- Formation: 31 October 1947; 79 years ago
- Type: Mathematical society
- Headquarters: Reykjavík, Iceland
- Location: Iceland
- Members: approx. 300 (2017)
- Website: http://www.stae.is

The Icelandic Mathematical Society (Icelandic: Íslenzka stærðfræðafélagið) is the umbrella organization for mathematicians in Iceland. In 2017, the Society had nearly 300 members. It is based in Reykjavík and hosts several conferences related to mathematics.

== History ==
=== Formation ===
The Society was founded in Reykjavík on 31 October 1947 at the home of, and in honour of, Ólafur Daníelsson, whose 70th birthday it was. The society records:

On Friday, 31 October 1947, which was the seventieth birthday of Ólafur Daníelsson, he gathered in his home several men and set up a Society. The purpose of the Society is to promote co-operation and promotion of people in Iceland who have completed a university degree in a mathematical subject. The Society holds meetings at which individual members explain their mathematical topics and, if desired, discussions on the topic will be conducted.

The founders of the Society were:

- mathematicians Sigurkarl Stefánsson, Leifur Ásgeirsson, Kr. Guðmundur Guðmundsson, Guðmundur Arnlaugsson and Björn Bjarnason;
- physicists Thorkell Thorkelsson, Sveinn Þórðarson and Thorbjorn Sigurgeirsson;
- astronomers Stein˛ór Sigurðsson and Trausti Einarsson;
- actuaries Brynjólfur Stefánsson and Árni Björnsson;
- engineers Bolli Thoroddsen and Gunnar Böðvarsson.

=== Early years ===
The Society adopted the name "Icelandic Mathematical Society" in 1952 when it was entering collaborations with other Scandinavian mathematical societies to found Mathematica Scandinavica.

The aim of the Society was that people should engage in discussions about their mathematical endeavors and share their ideas with one another. During the first decade of the Society, four or five lectures were delivered each year. The first lecture was delivered by Ólafur Daníelsson himself. He spoke "about the circle transcribed by the outer circumference of the triangle" and calculated its length relative to the radius of the inscribed circle and the circumference of the triangle. This was a topic he had worked on since 1900 but he had recently published a new result on it in the Danish Mathematical Journal.

The Society experienced rapid growth as new members soon joined and contributed by presenting their lectures. During the first few years, Bjarni Jónsson and Sigurður Helgason often delivered lectures and attended meetings regularly in the subsequent years.

== Activities ==
The Society holds monthly meetings, during which either a member or a guest delivers a talk. The talks cover diverse topics and are intended to reflect the Society's commitment to showcasing a wide array of mathematical topics and fostering an intellectually stimulating environment for its members and guests. Several well-known mathematicians, such as André Weil, have given guest talks at such meetings. Paul Erdős delivered three talks during his first visit to Iceland and an additional talk on a subsequent visit.

Since 1952, the Society has presented a book award to recognize exceptional performance in mathematics at the matriculation examination, encouraging and celebrating academic excellence.

In 1984, the Society played a pivotal role in organizing the Nineteenth Nordic Mathematical Congress in Reykjavík, a significant event that brought together mathematicians from the Nordic countries to foster collaboration and exchange of ideas.

In 1990, the Society organized a conference at Laugarvatn to commemorate Bjarni Jónsson on his 70th birthday.

Since 2001, the Society has been hosting the biannual conference "Stærðfræði á Íslandi"/"Mathematics in Iceland." This conference attracts 40–50 participants and features a program conducted in Icelandic. The talks encompass diverse topics, including mathematical research, teaching, and the practical applications of mathematics in industry.

Since 2003, the Society has collaborated with the Physics Association of Iceland, the Chemical Society of Iceland, and the Stjarna Sciences Association of Iceland to publish RAUST, the journal of science and mathematics.

== Collaborations ==
Since 1953 the Society has collaborated with other Scandinavian mathematical societies to publish Mathematica Scandinavica and Nordisk Matematisk Tidskrift. Sigur-karl Stefánsson was appointed as the first editor.

The committee of Danish Mathematical Society wrote a letter to inform Ólafur Daníelsson about the journal and the financial support they would provide. The funding was planned to be allocated in proportion to the number of inhabitants in each country, resulting in a 1% share of the costs for Iceland. The Ministry of Education in Iceland was the pioneering entity to provide financial support for the establishment of Mathematica Scandinavica. Subsequently, significant grants were provided by the Icelandic Life Insurance Companies to facilitate its setup.

During the Annual General Meeting of the Society on January 12, 2010, the Statutes of the Icelandic Mathematical Society were revised:

The Society is called the Icelandic Mathematical Society. Its home and base is in Reykjavík. The purpose of the Society is to:

(i) Be a forum for professional discussions for mathematicians and others interested in mathematics.

(ii) Introduce and promote mathematical research in Iceland.

(iii) Promote mathematical education and general mathematical knowledge in Iceland.

(iv) Promote the relationship between mathematicians within and outside the country and represent the members of the Society to related non-governmental organisations.

Members are required to have completed a university degree in mathematics or related subject and are then only considered after at least three years of university studies following graduation.

The Board of Directors of the Company shall be composed of five members, i.e. a chairman and four co-chairs. The chairman shall be elected for one year at each annual general meeting, but the board of directors for two years. The chairman handles the day-to-day management of the Society. The Annual General Meeting has the supreme authority in the affairs of the Society and will be held in January each year.

Those who have worked outstandingly for the Society's goals may be chosen as honorary members.

== Honorary membership ==
The Society has bestowed honorary membership upon three individuals: Ólafur Daníelsson, Leifur Ásgeirsson and Sigurður Helgason.
