= Linda Dröfn Gunnarsdóttir =

Icelandic executive

Linda Dröfn Gunnarsdóttir is an Icelandic executive who has managed development projects involving refugees, municipal support work and European-based initiatives. Recently appointed executive director of the Icelandic Association for Women's Shelters which is focused on providing accommodation for women subjected to violence in their homes, she is charged with finding new specially designed facilities to extend future support. As a result, she become one of the women included in the BBC's 2024 listing of 100 women.

== Education ==
Linda's qualifications include a B.A. in Spanish from the University of Iceland, an M.A. in European Studies from Denmark's Aarhus University and a business and finance degree from the Open University programme at Reykjavik University. She also holds a teaching diploma from the University of Iceland.

== Career ==
Linda has gained experience in project management as a result of municipal projects involving refugees and employment in the police commissioner's department of international affairs. Postings have included project manager at the Icelandic government's Evris Foundation, designed to encourage international collaboration. In late 2022, she was hired as a temporary director at Efling, an important trades union. She has also served as deputy director at the Multicultural Information Centre which helps newcomers adapt to life in Iceland.

In June 2022, Linda was appointed executive director of the Association for Women's Shelters. Her responsibilities extend to Iceland's two centres, one in Reykjavik and the other in Akureyri. In October 2024, Linda succeeded in finding new accommodation for the Akureyri shelter, ensuring operations for the next three years.

In December 2024, Linda was included in the BBC's 2024 listing of 100 women. She was quoted as explaining that "20 years ago, 64% of women who stayed at the shelter eventually went back to their abusers, but that figure is now down to 11% as a result of improved support and services."
