= Hjaltadalsá =

River in Skagafjörður, Iceland

- Etymology: Hjalti's valley river, named for Hjalti Þórðarson

Location
- Country: Iceland
- County: Skagafjörður (municipality)
- Region: Skagafjörður

Physical characteristics
- Source: Hjaltadalsjökull glacier
- Source confluence
  - coordinates: 65°42′24.05″N 19°6′43.89″W
- Length: 33 km (21 mi)
- Basin size: 303 km sq.

Basin features
- Tributaries
  - left: Víðinesá, Hofsá, Héðinsá, Heiðará
  - right: Suðurá, Grjótá, Hvammsá, Nautabúsá, Skúfsstaðaá

Hjaltadalsá is a river in Hjaltadalur valley in Skagafjörður, Iceland. It originates from Hjaltadalsjökull glacier and runs the full length of the valley, before many tributaries and lakes flow into it. Further down the river there are lots of rapids and small waterfalls and the current is strong and rough in many places. A little past the town of Sleitustaðir, the Hjaltadalsá and Kolka rivers run together. The river is known as Kolka from that point until it reaches the ocean. Hjaltadalsá often contains outwash, but Kolka has much more of it, which results in a significant color difference where the rivers converge.

Hjaltadalsá is a fishing river (as is Kolka). There is fishing for arctic char in particular, and sometimes salmon. The Reykjavík Fishing Club manages the river, and it is possible to buy a fishing permit.
