= Biskupslaug =

Natural warm spring in Skagafjörður, Iceland

Biskupslaug í Hjaltadal
- Interactive map of Biskupslaug í Hjaltadal
- Location: Reykja, Skagafjörður, Iceland
- Coordinates: 65.6623°N 19.0826°W
- Type: Warm water spring

Biskupslaug (Bishop Warm Water Springs) is a small, filled-in warm pool in Hjaltadalur, Iceland. It is situated on the property of Reykir in the heart of Hjaltadalur valley. It is round with a flagstone-paved bottom and there were, since ancient times, sedimentary beds out of the loaded wall. It is said that the bishops of Hólar had bathed there since the Middle Ages.

The so-called Vinnufólkslaug (Hjúalaug), or the servants’ bath, was a short way from there. It was larger but much colder and uncomfortable. Biskuplaug is a protected site.
