= Hjaltadalsheiði =

Plateau in Skagafjörður, Iceland

Coordinates: 65°36′21.676″N 18°53′41.032″W

Hjaltadalsheiði is both an old mountain road and the plateau between Hörgárdalur and Hólar in Hjaltadalur.
