= Kolbeinn Sigmundarson =

Ninth century Icelandic settler

Kolbeinn Sigmundarson (or Sigmundsson) was a viking chief and one of the first Icelandic settlers in the 9th century. His history is intertwined with that of Sleitu-Björn Hróarsson and the Skagafjörður region.

== History ==
According to the Landnámabók, Sleitu-Björn acquired Hjaltadalur and Kolbeinsdalur valleys, the latter of which is named for Kolbeinn, although Hjaltadalur was subsequently ceded to Hjalti Þórðarson. Very little is known about his genealogy, only that his wife was Þorsteinn svarfaður Rauðsson's sister. The Svarfdæla saga mentions that Kolbeinn was shipwrecked and died on the island Kolbeinsey, which is also named for him.

== Bibliography ==
- Ólafur Lárusson (1940), Landnám í Skagafirði, Sögufélag Skagfirðinga (in Icelandic)
