= Viðvík =

Farm in eastern Skagafjörður, Iceland

Coordinates: 65°45′54″N 19°16′40″W

- Farm, church site
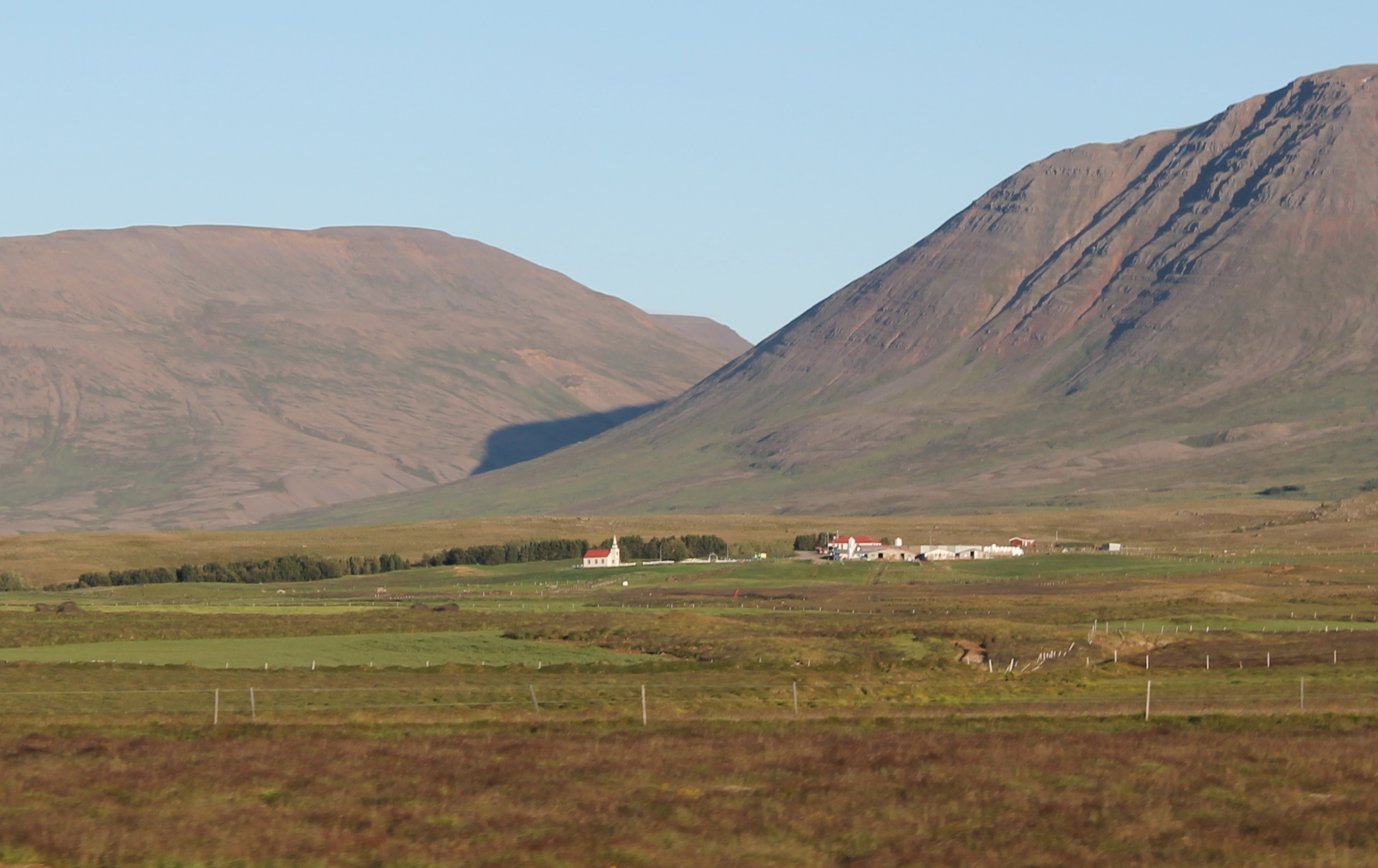
- Viðvík
- Interactive map of Viðvík
- Country: Iceland
- County: Skagafjörður
- District: Viðvíkursveit
- Founder: Öndóttur

Viðvík is a farm in Viðvíkursveit on the eastern side of Skagafjörður, Iceland right at the opening of Hjaltadalur valley, and south of Hjaltadalsá river. It was home the area's manor in past centuries.

== Description ==
There has been a church site in Viðvík for a long time; the first mention of the church was in 1189 and Guðmundur "the good" Arason was the home priest there. The parsonage was located there for a time, but now the church is served by priests from Hólar. The current church was built in 1886 and the tower in 1893.

Viðvík was the homestead of Öndóttur who settled Viðvíkursveit, but later, Þorbjörn "the fishhook" Þórðarson, who killed Grettir "the strong" Ásmundarson, lived there. Accordingly, Grettis saga mentions that Þorbjörn moved Grettir's head to his home in Viðvík and preserved it in salt during the winter in a storehouse, which was later called Grettisbúr (Grettir's cage).

In the Age of the Sturlungs, Þorgils skarði Böðvarsson lived in Viðvík for a time and the land there is often mentioned in the Sturlunga saga including, among other things, the lively social scene of 1255:

In Viðvík there was a lot of fun and merriment, games, and large crowds. It came to pass that one Lord’s day, a large group of people gathered together and danced. Hámundur, the priest from Hólar, had sung at Miklibær in Óslandshlíð that day; and had ridden to Viðvík to dance, and the people there were at play and many admired his dancing. Upon his arrival to Hólar, Bishop [Heinrekur] admonished him and expelled him from the church and was unwilling to see him. When Þorgils learned of this, he invited the priest to his home. The priest Hámundur appeared before his friends, then the bishop reconciled with him at the people’s behest; but he never treated him quite as well as he had before.
