= Nauthólsvík =

Neighbourhood in Reykjavík, Iceland

Coordinates: 64.1212°N 21.9285°W

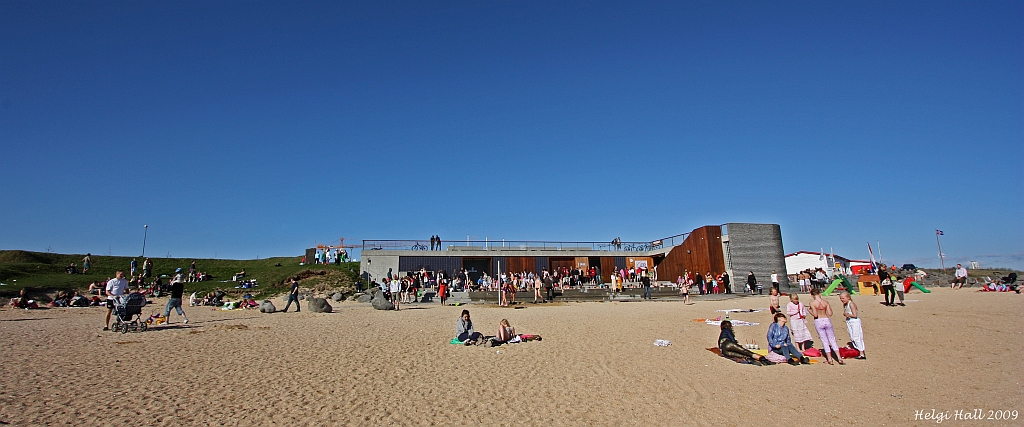
Beach at Nauthólsvik

Nauthólsvík (Icelandic pronunciation: [ˈnœytˌhoulsˌviːk], "bull hill bay") is a Seaside resort and a small neighbourhood in Reykjavík, the capital city of Iceland, about 900 metres (3,000 ft) from Perlan. It has a beach with an artificial hot spring – hot water is pumped into a man-made lagoon.

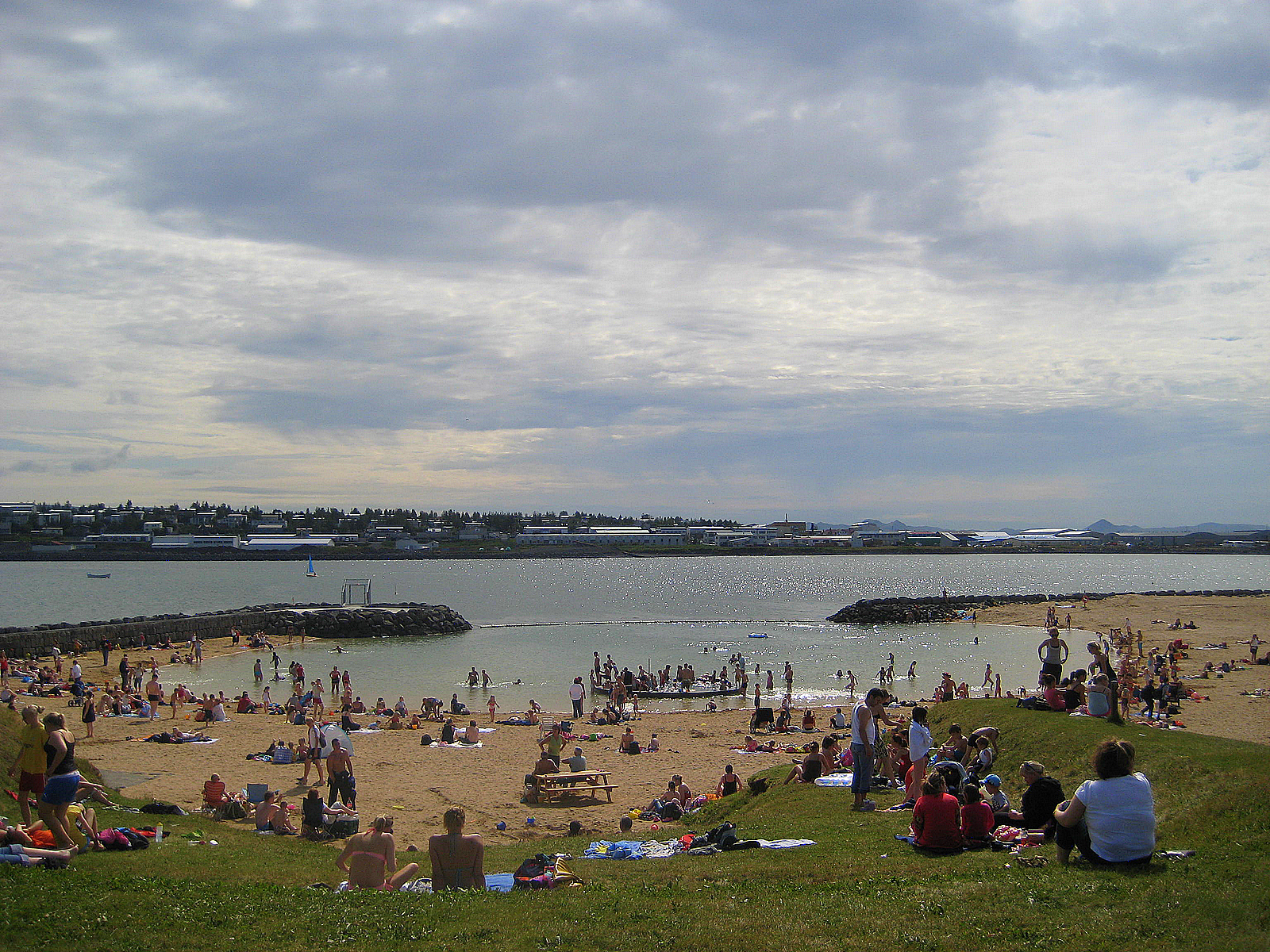

The temperature of the ocean is usually about 12 to 16 °C (54 to 61 °F) during the summer and drops down to about −2 °C (28 °F) in the winter. The area inside the cove is usually a few degrees warmer than the ocean. The temperature of the hot tub is pretty consistent around 38.5 °C (101.3 °F) with the second hot tub being a lot cooler. The service centre also sells beverages and snacks.

Reykjavík University is located in Nauthólsvík in a new building, opened in 2010.
