= Öndóttur =

Ninth century Icelandic settler

- Öndóttur kráka Erlingsson
- Born: c. 892
- Known for: Settling Skagafjörður, Iceland
- Children: Böðvar Öndottsson

Öndóttur kráka ("the crow") Erlingsson (born c. 892) is the name of a Viking chief and one of Iceland's first settlers.

== Biography ==
His history is intertwined with that of Sleitu-Björn Hróarsson and the Skagafjörður region. He established his estate in Viðvíkursveit, which previously belonged to Sleitu-Björn. His grandson, Thorvardur Sage-Böðvarsson, built the first church in Hjaltadalur in 984. The Ásbirningar family clan claimed to be Öndóttur's descendants.

His son Böðvar Öndottsson (born 920) appears in the Gull-Þóris saga.

== Bibliography ==
- Ólafur Lárusson (1940), Landnám í Skagafirði, Sögufélag Skagfirðinga (in Icelandic)
