= Neðri-Ás =

Location of Iceland's first Christian church

Coordinates: 65.7742°N 19.2526°W

- Farm
- Interactive map of Neðri-Ás
- Country: Iceland
- County: Skagafjörður
- Valley: Hjaltadalur
- Named for: The ridge between Hjaltadalur and Kolbeinsdalur valleys

Neðri-Ás ("Lower Ridge") is a farm in Hjaltadalur valley in Skagafjörður, Iceland. The estate was originally named Ás but it was later divided in two and the farm Efri-Ás ("Upper Ridge") was erected just a little farther into the valley. Neðri-Ás is in the mouth of the valley in the north, at the base of the ridge between Hjaltadalur and Kolbeinsdalur.

== History ==
Þorvarður Spak-Böðvarsson lived in Ás in the late 10th century. He converted to Christianity and built a church on his farm 16 years before the Christianization of Iceland in the year 984 (or 983 if one considers the Christianization as starting in 999), and it was the first church built in Iceland. The only source about the church's construction is Kristni saga, which was written around 300 years later, but in an archaeological excavation in Neðri-Ás between 1998 and 1999, the church's foundation was uncovered, which was reliably dated to before 1104 and is likely from around the year 1000, indicating that a church had been built in Ás very early. The Kristni saga states that Þorvarður's church, built from wood brought in from England, was still standing under Bishop Bótólfur (1238–1246), and the excavation actually revealed that there had been three churches in Ás, the last of which had burned down, probably around 1300.

Additionally, around 100 graves were excavated in the church's cemetery; it seems that nearly all of them were from before the year 1104. It is possible that the cemetery fell out of use when the office of the bishop was established in Hólar in 1106.
