= Skemman =

Skemman.is (est. 2007) is an online digital library of research publications in Iceland. The National and University Library of Iceland in Reykjavík currently operates the repository. It was overseen by the Teachers' Training College from 2006 to 2009. Contributors of content include the Agricultural University of Iceland, Bifröst University, Hólar University College, Iceland Academy of the Arts, National and University Library of Iceland, Reykjavik University, University of Akureyri, and University of Iceland.

== See also ==
- Libraries in Iceland
- Media of Iceland
