= Hjalti Þórðarson =

Viking chief of 9th century Iceland

- Era: Icelandic settlement
- Known for: Settling Hjaltadalur valley
- Children: Þorvaldur and Þórður

Hjalti Þórðarson was a viking chief and one of the first of Iceland's settlers in the ninth century.

== History ==
His story is intertwined with that of Kolbeinn Sigmundarson and the Skagafjörður region in Iceland. He established his residence in Hóf in Hjaltadalur valley, which is named for him and was previously acquired by Kolbeinn and Sleitu-Björn Hróarsson in his time.

According to the Landnámabók, his two sons, Þorvaldur and Þórður, became prominent figures in the Icelandic Commonwealth. Upon their father's death, they organized the most ostentatious funeral in his honor with 1,440 guests, an event that was not equaled until decades later by the funeral rites for Hoskuld Dala-Kollsson. On one occasion, the brothers led the Þorskafjörður Thing and organized a magnificent reception that impressed the guests so much that they said that the Æsir must be walking among them.

Hjalti's grandson, Þorbjörn öngull Þórðarson (Þorbjörn "the [fish]hook" Þórðarson), murdered the outlaw Grettir Ásmundarson.

== Bibliography ==
- Ólafur Lárusson (1940), Landnám í Skagafirði, Sögufélag Skagfirðinga (in Icelandic)
