= Sigurður Helgason (mathematician) =

Icelandic mathematician (1927–2023)

Sigurdur Helgason
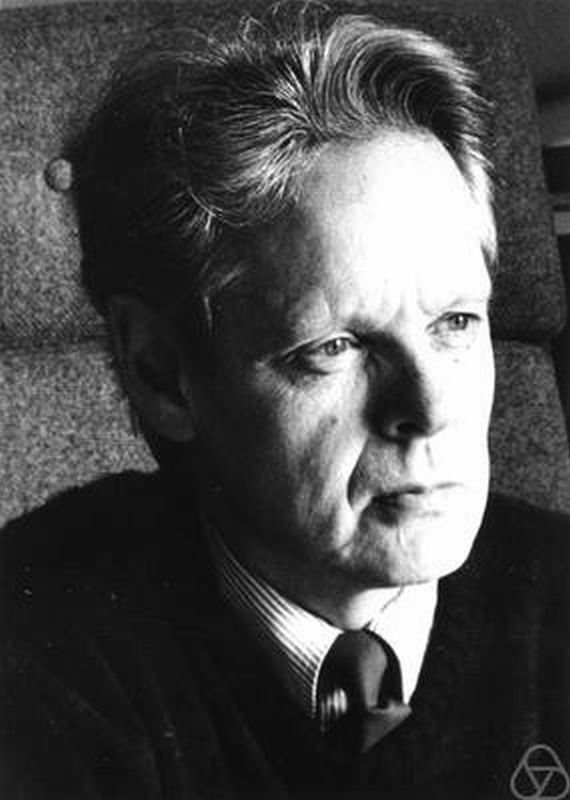
- Helgason in 1988
- Born: 30 September 1927; Akureyri, Iceland
- Died: 3 December 2023 (aged 96)
- Occupation: Mathematician
- Honors: AMS fellow (2013); Leroy P. Steele Prize (1988); AAA&S member (1970)
- Scientific career
- Doctoral advisor: Salomon Bochner

Sigurdur Helgason (Icelandic: Sigurður Helgason; 30 September 1927 – 3 December 2023) was an Icelandic mathematician whose research has been devoted to the geometry and analysis on symmetric spaces. In particular, he used new integral geometric methods to establish fundamental existence theorems for differential equations on symmetric spaces as well as some new results on the representations of their isometry groups. He also introduced a Fourier transform on these spaces and proved the principal theorems for this transform, the inversion formula, the Plancherel theorem and the analog of the Paley–Wiener theorem.

== Biography ==
Sigurdur Helgason was born in Akureyri, Iceland on 30 September 1927. In 1954, he earned a PhD from Princeton University under Salomon Bochner. Helgason became a professor of mathematics at the Massachusetts Institute of Technology in 1965, and he retired from the faculty in 2014.

Helgason received the Børge Jessen Diploma Award of the Danish Mathematical Society in 1982, and the Grand Knight's Cross (Stórriddarakross) of the Icelandic Order of the Falcon in 1991. He was winner of the 1988 Leroy P. Steele Prize for Seminal Contributions for his books Groups and Geometric Analysis and Differential Geometry, Lie Groups and Symmetric Spaces. This was followed by the 2008 book Geometric Analysis on Symmetric Spaces. On 31 May 1996, Helgason received an honorary doctorate from the Faculty of Science and Technology at Uppsala University, Sweden.

Helgason was elected a member of the Icelandic Academy of Sciences in 1960, the American Academy of Arts and Sciences in 1970, and the Royal Danish Academy of Sciences and Letters in 1972. In 2013, he became a fellow of the American Mathematical Society. He was made an honorary member of the Icelandic Mathematical Society when he turned 70, and a symposium was held in his honor.

Helgason died on 3 December 2023, at the age of 96.

== Selected works ==
=== Articles ===
- Helgason, S. (1954). "The derived algebra of a Banach algebra". Proceedings of the National Academy of Sciences of the United States of America. 40 (10): 994–995. Bibcode:1954PNAS...40..994H. doi:10.1073/pnas.40.10.994. PMC 534208. PMID 16589593.
- Helgason, Sigurdur (1957). "Topologies of group algebras and a theorem of Littlewood". Transactions of the American Mathematical Society. 86 (2): 269–283. doi:10.1090/S0002-9947-1957-0095428-5. hdl:1721.1/26691. MR 0095428.
- Helgason, Sigurdur (1958). "Lacunary Fourier series on noncommutative groups". Proceedings of the American Mathematical Society. 9 (5): 782–790. doi:10.1090/S0002-9939-1958-0100234-5. MR 0100234.
- Helgason, Sigurdur (1958). "On Riemannian curvature of homogeneous spaces". Proceedings of the American Mathematical Society. 9 (6): 831–838. doi:10.1090/S0002-9939-1958-0108811-2. MR 0108811.
- Helgason, S. (1962). "Some results on invariant theory". Bulletin of the American Mathematical Society. 68 (4): 367–371. doi:10.1090/S0002-9904-1962-10812-X. hdl:1721.1/26682. MR 0166303.
- Helgason, S. (1963). "Fundamental solutions to invariant differential operators on symmetric spaces". Bulletin of the American Mathematical Society. 69 (6): 778–781. doi:10.1090/S0002-9904-1963-11029-0. hdl:1721.1/26683. MR 0156919.
- Helgason, S. (1963). "Duality and Radon transforms for symmetric spaces". Bulletin of the American Mathematical Society. 69 (6): 782–7881. doi:10.1090/S0002-9904-1963-11030-7. hdl:1721.1/26684. MR 0158408.
- Helgason, Sigurdur (1964). "A duality in integral geometry; some generalizations of the Radon transform". Bulletin of the American Mathematical Society. 70 (4): 435–446. doi:10.1090/S0002-9904-1964-11147-2. hdl:1721.1/26685. MR 0166795.
- Helgason, S. (1965). "Radon–Fourier transforms on symmetric spaces and related group representations". Bulletin of the American Mathematical Society. 71 (5): 757–763. doi:10.1090/S0002-9904-1965-11380-5. hdl:1721.1/26686. MR 0179295.
- Helgason, Sigurdur; Korányi, Ádám (1968). "A Fatou-type theorem for harmonic functions on symmetric spaces". Bulletin of the American Mathematical Society. 74 (2): 258–263. doi:10.1090/S0002-9904-1968-11912-3. hdl:1721.1/26687. MR 0229179.
- Helgason, Sigurdur (1969). "Applications of the Radon transform to representations of semisimple Lie groups". Proceedings of the National Academy of Sciences of the United States of America. 63 (3): 643–647. Bibcode:1969PNAS...63..643H. doi:10.1073/pnas.63.3.643. PMC 223499. PMID 16591772.
- Helgason, Sigurdur (1973). "Paley-Wiener theorems and surjectivity of invariant differential operators on symmetric spaces and Lie groups". Bulletin of the American Mathematical Society. 79 (1): 129–132. doi:10.1090/S0002-9904-1973-13127-1. hdl:1721.1/26688. MR 0312158.
- Helgason, Sigurdur (1977). "Invariant differential equations and homogeneous manifolds" (PDF). Bulletin of the American Mathematical Society. 83 (5): 751–774. doi:10.1090/S0002-9904-1977-14317-6. MR 0445235.

=== Books ===
- Differential geometry and symmetric spaces. Academic Press 1962, AMS 2001
- Analysis on Lie groups and homogeneous spaces. AMS 1972
- Differential geometry, Lie groups and symmetric spaces. Academic Press 1978, 7th edn. 1995
- The Radon Transform. Birkhäuser, 1980, 2nd edn. 1999
- Topics in harmonic analysis on homogeneous spaces. Birkhäuser 1981
- Groups and geometric analysis: integral geometry, invariant differential operators and spherical functions. Academic Press 1984, AMS 1994
- Geometric analysis on symmetric spaces. AMS 1994, 2nd. edn. 2008

== Sources ==
- "Curriculum vitae". Massachusetts Institute of Technology. 2005.
- "Sigurdur Helgason". Massachusetts Institute of Technology.
