= Þorskafjörður =

Fjord in Iceland

Coordinates: 65°33′33″N 22°10′10″W

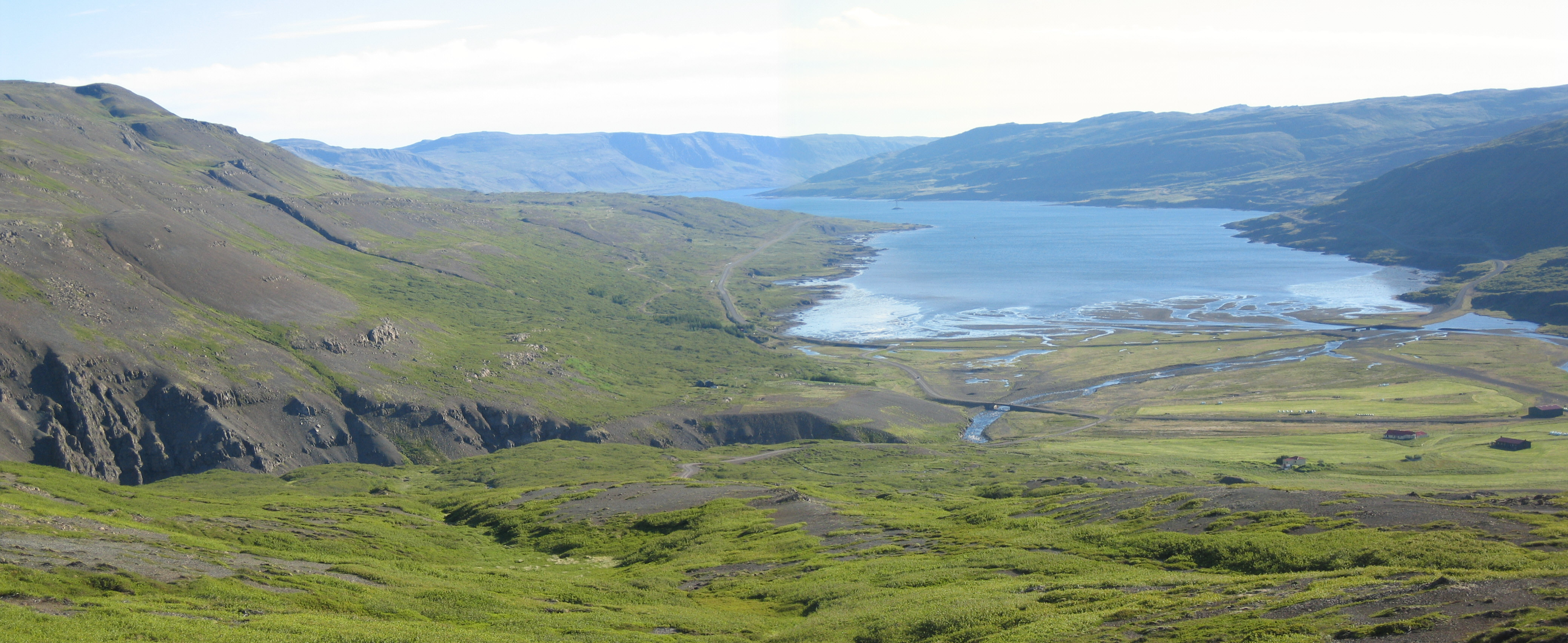
A view down to Þorskafjörður from Þorskafjarðarheiði.

Þorskafjörður is a roughly sixteen-kilometre-long fjord in the Icelandic county of Austur-Barðastrandarsýsla.

== Geography ==
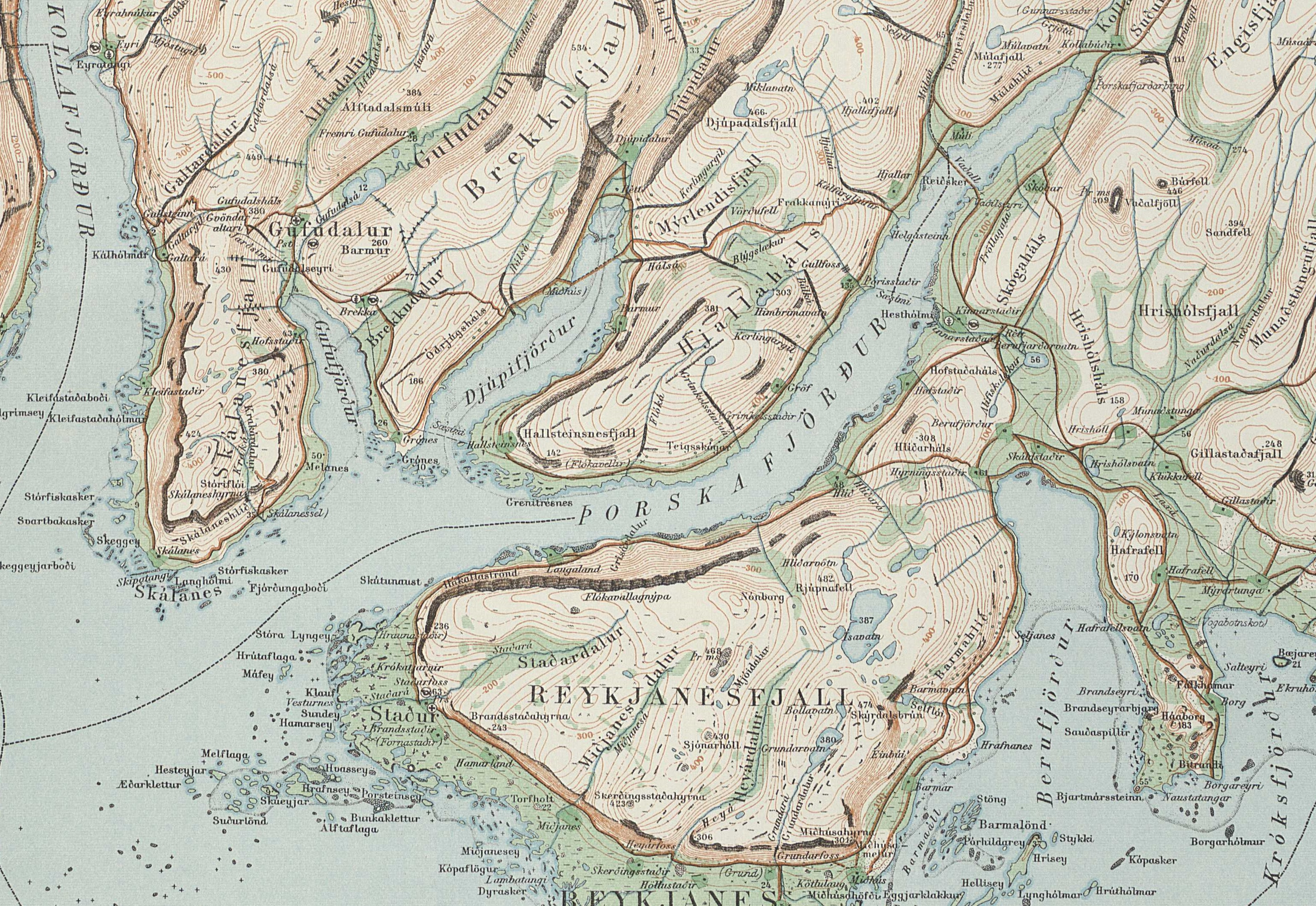
Map showing Þorskafjörður, Djúpifjörður, and Gufufjörður, 1933

Þorskfjörður lies between headlands called Reykjanes and Skálanes. Like other fjords in its area, Þorskafjörður is shallow; its innermost shore is formed of clay. Two short and shallow fjords branch off Þorskafjörður: Djúpifjörður and Gufufjörður. The average flood height in Þorskafjörður is 3.60m and the highest measured flood height is 5.66m.

From the bottom of Þorskafjörður, Þjóðvegur 60 runs through Þorskafjarðarheiði across to Ísafjarðardjúp. This road was laid in 1940-1946 and served as the main route between Reykjavík and Djúp until 1987, when a road through Steingrímsfjarðarheiði was opened.

In 2021, work began to bridge the fjord, then due to be completed in 2024. The work is part of the extension of Vestfjarðarvegur into Gufudalsveit.

== History ==
The fjord is the setting of much of the medieval Icelandic saga Gull-Þóris saga. The poet Matthías Jochumsson was born on the farm Skógar in Þorskafjörður in 1835.

== Inhabited farms ==
- Hofstaðir
- Kinnarstaðir

== Deserted farms ==
- Laugaland
- Gröf
- Þórisstaðir
- Múli
- Kollabúðir
- Skógar
