= Kolka (Kolbeinsdalsá) =

River in Skagafjörður, Iceland

Kolka Kolbeinsdalsá, Kolbeinsá
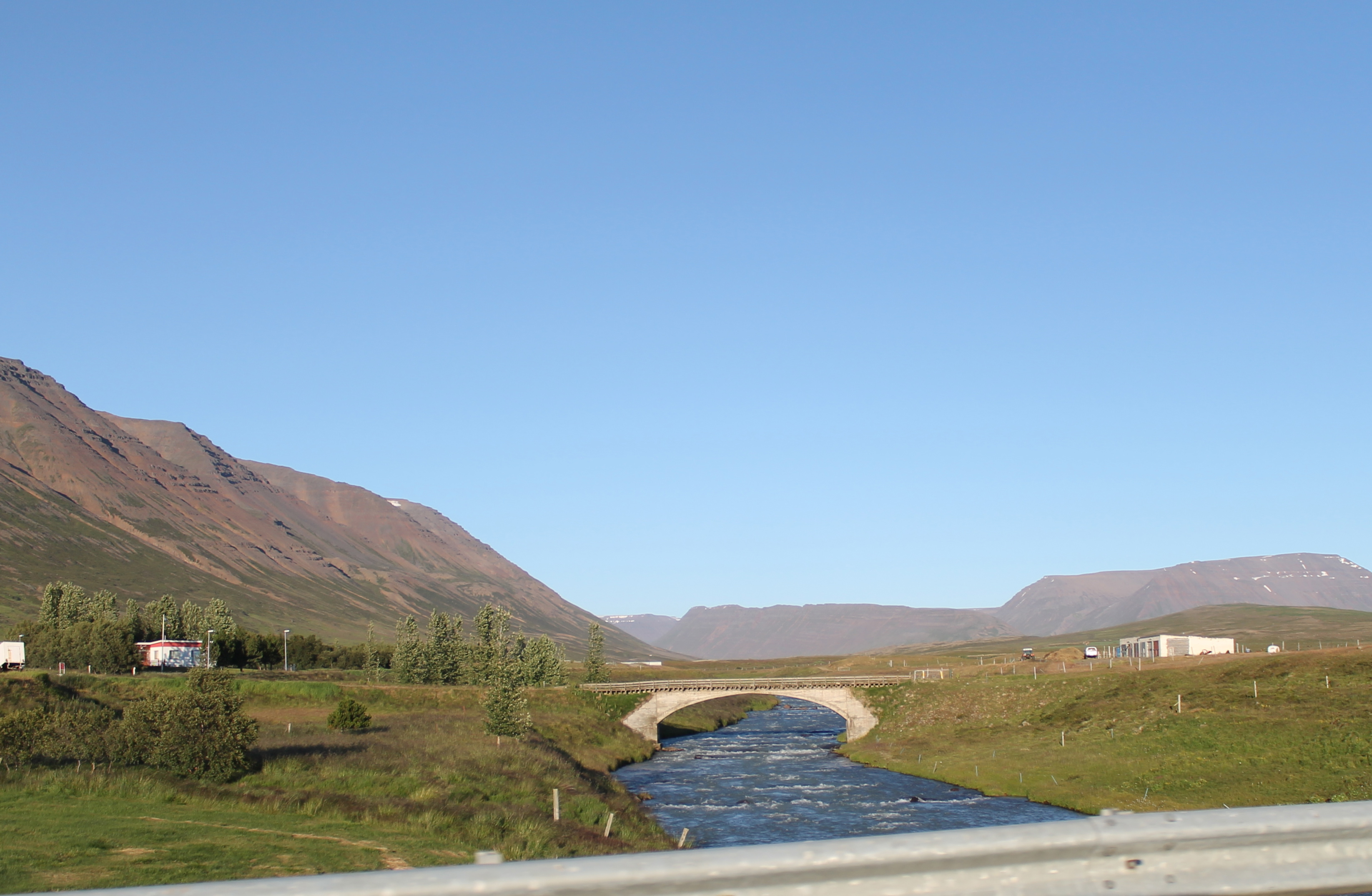
- An old bridge over the Kolka
- Etymology: Named for Kolbeinsdalur, the valley the river flows through, which is named for Kolbeinn Sigmundarson

Location
- Country: Iceland
- Region: Skagafjörður

Physical characteristics
- Source: Tungnahryggsjökull glacier
- Mouth: Kolkuós (Kolka estuary)
  - coordinates: 65°46′9.912″N 19°4′40.688″W
- Length: 32 km (20 mi)

Basin features
- Cities: Sleitustaðir
- Tributaries
  - left: Tungnahryggsá, Lambá
  - right: Heljará, Skíðadalsá, Ingjaldsá

Kolka or Kolbeinsdalsá (literally: Kolbeinn's valley river; also formerly Kolbeinsá or "Kolbeinn's river") is a river that originates in the Tungnahryggsjökull glacier and is therefore often glacier-colored. Near its source, the river splits into two branches (near Tungnahryggur ridge), with the eastern called Kolka and the western Tungnahryggsá. They are sometimes called Austurá and Vesturá (East River and West River), respectively. The Kolka flows lengthwise along Kolbeinsdalur valley in Skagafjörður, Iceland and continues north along Óslandshlíð until it reaches the sea in Kolkuós. After the rivers run parallel for a good distance, the Hjaltadalsá river and Kolka merge together a little further down at the farm Þúfur in Óslandshlíð, and the river is called Kolka from there on. Both rivers flow rapidly in parts and it very difficult to build bridges over them. The rivers are suitable for white-water rafting when the water is high.

There is considerable trout fishing in Kolka, more than in Hjaltadalsá, although there is a dam in the Kolka that limits fish migration. Many fish are raised a little further below the dam, and there is local brown trout above it. An attempt has been made to raise salmon in the river and it has had some success, although there is not much salmon fishing. The Reykjavík Angling Association (Stangveiðifélag Reykjavíkur) manages the river and sells fishing licenses.

== Sleitustaðir ==
Sleitustaðir or Sleitu-Bjarnarstaðir (sometimes Sleitubjarnarstaðir) is a town in Kolbeinsdalur valley—although some consider it to be outside the mouth of the valley—on the eastern side of Skagafjörður. The town is named after the settler Sleitu-Björn Hróarsson. There are the beginnings of a village, including some houses, a garage, a gas station, and a small store. There were significant bus operations out of Sleitustaðir and the people there had exclusive privileges to operate on Siglufjarðar road. It is also the location of a power plant.

In 1985, a privately held power plant was built in Kolka near Sleitustaðir that sells power to the distribution network, RARIK. It produces 200 kw of power and it is owned by the private company Sleitustaðavirkjun Ltd.
