= Hof í Hjaltadal =

Farm in Skagafjörður, Iceland

Hof Hof í Hjaltadal
- Farm
- Hof in Hjaltadalur
- Interactive map of Hof
- Coordinates: 65.7126318591°N 19.0952260461°W
- Country: Iceland
- County: Skagafjörður
- Valley: Hjaltadalur
- Founder: Hjalti Þórðarson

Hof í Hjaltadal (Hof in Hjaltadalur), or simply Hof, is a farm in Hjaltadalur in Skagafjörður, Iceland. According to the Landnámabók, it was the homestead of Hjalti Þórðarson. Hof was also reportedly the location of the most well-attended and finest wake in the country, which Hjalti's sons held for their father.

There are a lot of archaeological artifacts but there have not been any significant studies in Hof. Still, it seems that there was a large farm whose residence fell into disuse in the 11th century; the farm moved to Hólar, which is a very short distance from Hof. The settlement in Hof seems to have been intermittently inhabited up until 1827 when it was built into one of Hólar's smallholdings.

The farm sits on a tall hill and Hjaltur's sons had a fort there.
