= Kolbeinsdalur =

Valley in Skagafjörður, Iceland

- Long-axis direction: east south east

Naming
- English translation: Kolbeinn's Valley

Geography
- Country: Iceland
- State/Province: Skagafjörður
- Coordinates: 65°46′24″N 19°9′45″W
- Interactive map of Kolbeinsdalur

Kolbeinsdalur is a valley on the eastern side of Skagafjörður, Iceland. It reaches north and east of Hjaltadalur, which it runs parallel to (running east south east) until Hjaltadalur curves south near Hólar, while Kolbeinsdalur continues directly eastward. There is a long ridge, often simply called the Ásinn ("the ridge") between the two valleys where they run parallel to one another. A hollow named Hálsgróf (or just Grófin, which means "hollow") is to the east between the ridges and mountains and there is a drivable road over it. A little ways in, the valley curves again to the southeast. The tributary valleys Heljardalur and Skíðadalur are on the eastern side of Kolbeinsdalur, and a little farther in there is the so-called Ingjaldsskál.

== Geography ==
Kolbeinsdalsá river, also called Kolka, runs through the valley, which is said to be named for the settler Kolbeinn Sigmundarson. The bottom of the valley, back against the property, is believed to have been settled by Sleitu-Björn Hróarsson, and the land in the mouth of the valley, Sleitustaðir or Sleitu-Bjarnarstaðir, is named after him. The land of Smiðsgerði, which is nearby, is also settled, but otherwise the valley is now completely deserted.

The center of Kolbeinsdalur splits in two near the Tungnahryggur ridge, and the valleys are often called Austurdalur and Vesturdalur (East Valley and West Valley). Off the ridges, in front of the valley floor, is Tungnahryggsjökull glacier. In Tungnahryggur, a short distance from the glacier, there is a cabin or refuge house, called Tungnahryggsskál, which was pulled into place in 1982, and expanded in 1991. The old, well-traveled mountain road through Heljardalsheiði from Svarfaðardalur and to Hólar runs partially through the lower part of Kolbeinsdalur.

=== Heljardalur ===
Heljadalur ("death valley") is a side valley off of Kolbeinsdalur. There is a road along the valley over Heljardalsheiði plateau. According to local folklore, the valley got its name because many people from the entourage of the Bishop of Hólar, Guðmundar góði ("the good") Arason had died there from exposure to the elements.

There is another valley of the same name off Heljardalsfjall mountain and Stakfell in Þistilfjörður.

=== Old thoroughfares from Kolbeinsdalur ===
Before highways were built, the main roads out of Kolbeinsdalur were:

- Heljardalsheiði over Svarfaðardalur into Eyjafjörður.
- Hákambar from Heljardalsheiði to Ólafsfjörður.
- Tungnahryggsleið to Barkárdalur in Eyjafjörður. Another path out of Kolbeinsdalur was through Hólamannaskarð to Barkárdalur.
- Hálsgróf, or "Grófin", heading into Hjaltadalur. There is an easily passable gravel road through Grófin to Fjall.

There is also a road for jeeps down the western side of the valley, but it is difficult to travel.

=== Farms in Kolbeinsdalur ===
Kolbeinsdalur used to be fully settled but has since become deserted.

The farms on the western side of the valley are:

- Unastaðir, on the outer side of the valley
- Fjall (Fjall í Kolbeinsdal), where there is a rental property for hunters, etc.

The farms on the eastern side of the valley are:

- Bygghóll
- Syðri-Heljará
- Bjarnastaðasel, which is potentially on the same land as the old farm Ytri-Heljará
- Bjarnastaðir (Bjarnastaðir í Kolbeinsdal)
- Skriðiuland (Skriðiuland í Kolbeinsdal)
- Saurbær (Sæurbær í Kolbeinsdal)
- Sviðningur (Sviðningur í Kolbeinsdal), which became uninhabited after an avalanche in 1925
- Smiðsgerði, where people do live in the summer
- Sleitustaðir, which was Sleitu-Bjarnarstaðir earlier in Iceland's history. There is a small cluster of homes there.

All of these farms were part of Hólahreppur. Geographically speaking, Sleitustaðir could be considered both in the entrance of Kolbeinsdalur and one of the innermost farms in Óslandshlíð.

There are ruins of some shielings and old farms in the valley. Bakki was an old farm between Skriðuland and Saurbær, and it seems to have been part of Skriðuland for most of its history.

Nautasel is in the interior along Skíðadalsá. There are quite a few ruins from shielings from Hólar in Hjaltadalur.

=== Kolbeinsdalur pastureland ===
For centuries, the inner part of Kolbeinsdalur belonged to the bishopric in Hólar, and most of the properties in Hólarhreppur and Víðvíkursveit had a right to the pastureland there. During sheep round-up season, it was divided into the following zones:

- Hnjúkar or Kolbeinsdalshnjúkar (Kolbeinsdalur peaks)
- North and south Heljardalur
- North and south Skíðadalur
- Staðargöngur, named after Hólastaður, heading into at Tungnahryggur

The west side included:

- Skálar, also named after a small dell near the top of the mountain
- Elliði, heading into Fjall in Kolbeinsdalur

The pasture has been expanded incrementally, and the innermost deserted areas were added to the pasture, up to and including Skriðuland to the east, and Fjall, and part of Unastaðir to the west.

There is an old stone paddock on an island in the Heljará river that was used up to the 20th century but has become damaged due to the river flooding.
