= Reykjavík University =

Private university in Reykjavík, Iceland

Reykjavik University
- Háskólinn í Reykjavík
- Seal of Reykjavik University
- Other name: RU
- Former name: Reykjavík School of Business
- Type: Private University
- Established: 1 September 1998
- Accreditation: Ministry of Higher Education, Science and Innovation
- Affiliations: EUA, AMBA
- Chairman: Guðbjörg Edda Eggertsdóttir
- President: Ragnhildur Helgadóttir
- Academic staff: 320 (200 part-time lecturers)
- Administrative staff: 100
- Total staff: 420
- Students: 3,500 (2022)
- Location: Menntavegur 1, Reykjavík, 102, Iceland; 64.1237°N 21.9267°W
- Campus: 35 acres (14 ha); Urban
- Language: Icelandic & English
- Colors: Red and White
- Website: en.ru.is

Reykjavík University (RU; Icelandic: Háskólinn í Reykjavík, pronounced [ˈhauːˌskouːlɪn iː ˈreiːcaˌviːk], lit. 'The University in Reykjavík') is the largest private university in Iceland with approximately 3,300 students. It is chartered by the Chamber of Commerce, the Federation of Icelandic Industries, and the Confederation of Icelandic Employers.

The university consists of seven academic departments in two schools. Within the School of Social Sciences are: the Department of Law, Department of Business Administration, Department of Sport Science, and Department of Psychology. Within the School of Technology are the Department of Computer Science, Department of Engineering, and Department of Applied Engineering. The university is bilingual (English and Icelandic).

== History ==
Reykjavík University has its roots in the Commercial College of Iceland, School of Computer Science (TVÍ), which was founded in January 1988 and operated within the Commercial College of Iceland (VÍ) facilities for ten years.

Reykjavík University started its first semester on 1 September 1998, in a new building under the name Reykjavík School of Business. TVÍ became one of two departments within the school. A name change was inevitable because the school's name was not descriptive for the variety of the school's operations.

In January 2000, the name was changed to Reykjavík University. In the autumn of 2002, the School of Law was established at Reykjavík University and in 2005, Reykjavík University was merged with the Technical University of Iceland (THÍ) under the name Reykjavík University. Following the merger, the School of Science and Engineering was established, partly built upon the old foundation of THÍ with the addition of new engineering fields.

== Rankings ==
University rankings

Global – Overall
- THE World: 801-1000 (2025)
- THE Young Universities: 54 (2023)

Times Higher Education

- Young University Rankings 2023 - Ranked 54th
- World University Rankings 2023 - Ranked 301-350th

== Administration ==
Ragnhildur Helgadóttir is the president of Reykjavik University, succeeding Ari Kristinn Jónsson in September 2021.

== Academic schools and course offerings ==
Entrance of Reykjavik University's Nauthólsvík campus.

The university features seven academic departments in two schools in which teaching and research is carried out:

School of Social Sciences

- Department of Business Administration
- Department of Law
- Department of Sport Science
- Department of Psychology

School of Technology

- Department of Computer Science
- Department of Engineering
- Department of Applied Engineering

Entrance of Reykjavik University's Nauthólsvík campus (Sun).

All departments offer a three-year study programme leading to a BSc or BA degree. All departments offer graduate programmes and PhD programmes taught in English. Reykjavik University also offers preliminary studies for students who need more preparation before beginning their university studies and an Open University with executive education courses for professionals.

== Iceland School of Energy ==
Iceland School of Energy is operated within the School of Science and Engineering. The School offers opportunities for research, design and the management of systems for sustainable energy.

== Research ==
Reykjavik University's research subjects are technology, business, and law. RU has participated in a formal implementation program of the European Commission policy regarding the working environment of researchers. In 2016, RU scientists published 245 articles, posters and abstracts in peer-reviewed conferences/symposia/ proceedings and 177 articles in peer-reviewed scholarly journals.

== Campus ==
Reykjavik University's Nauthólsvík campus, as seen from Öskjuhlíð Hill.

Reykjavik University operates in Nauthólsvík in a building that opened in January 2010. The structure of the building resembles the sun with its rays that extend from its core.

The university building accommodates all of its activities, including lecture halls, classrooms, a library, a gym, a cafeteria, a convenience store, administrative offices, and well-equipped study areas and group-work rooms. Students have 24/7 access to the campus study facilities.

== Partner institutions ==
Reykjavík University partners with many universities and companies in areas of research and education. For instance, it offers a double degree in computer science together with the University of Camerino. Students have the opportunity to enter exchange programmes through Nordplus and other partnership networks.

The university is an active member of the University of the Arctic. UArctic is an international cooperative network based in the Circumpolar Arctic region, consisting of more than 200 universities, colleges, and other organizations with an interest in promoting education and research in the Arctic region.

The university participates in UArctic's mobility program north2north. The aim of that program is to enable students of member institutions to study in different parts of the North.

== International accreditation ==
The Master of Project Management (MPM) programme of the University that is hosted at the Department of Engineering at the School of Technology has been accredited by the Association for Project Management (APM). The university's Executive MBA program has been awarded 5-year accreditation by the London-based international accreditation organisation Association of MBAs (AMBA). The undergraduate programme in Business Studies has been awarded the EPAS accreditation. Several programmes within the School of Computer Science have been awarded an EQANIE accreditation.

== See also ==
- Skemman.is (digital library)
