= Viðvíkursveit =

District in Skagafjörður, Iceland

- District
- Interactive map of Viðvíkursveit
- Coordinates: 65°46′7.810″N 19°19′54.944″W
- Country: Iceland
- County: Skagafjörður (municipality)
- Founder: Öndóttur

Viðvíkursveit is a district in Skagafjörður, Iceland east of the Héraðsvötn, on the border of Akrahreppur along the Kyrfisá river to Kolka and on the east side towards the mouth of Hjaltadalur valley. It comprises the same area as Viðvíkurhreppur did before the creation of Skagafjörður County. The part of the region south of Gljúfurá river is called Hofstaðapláss and is often not considered to be a part of Viðvíkursveit. Viðvíkurfjall waterfall overlooks the eastern portion of the area, and to the west is the Héraðsvötn, followed by Lónssandur beach on the outside of Austurós estuary.

== History of settlement ==
The region was settled by the explorer Öndóttur who lived in Viðvík, in the easternmost part of the district. The area downriver of Kolka and out to Kolkuós estuary is called Brimnes and used to be home to the Brimnes woods. The woods, mentioned in the Landnámabók, are now a hilly area too windy to support tree growth. Recently, enthusiasts have formed a group to revive Brimnes woods using only seeds from what little remains of the forest that was in Skagafjörður and has grown there since the Age of Settlement, especially in Geirmundarhólur forest in Hrolleifsdalur valley.

Two small islands face the district, Lundey and Elínarhólmi.
