= Gull-Þóris saga =

Icelandic saga

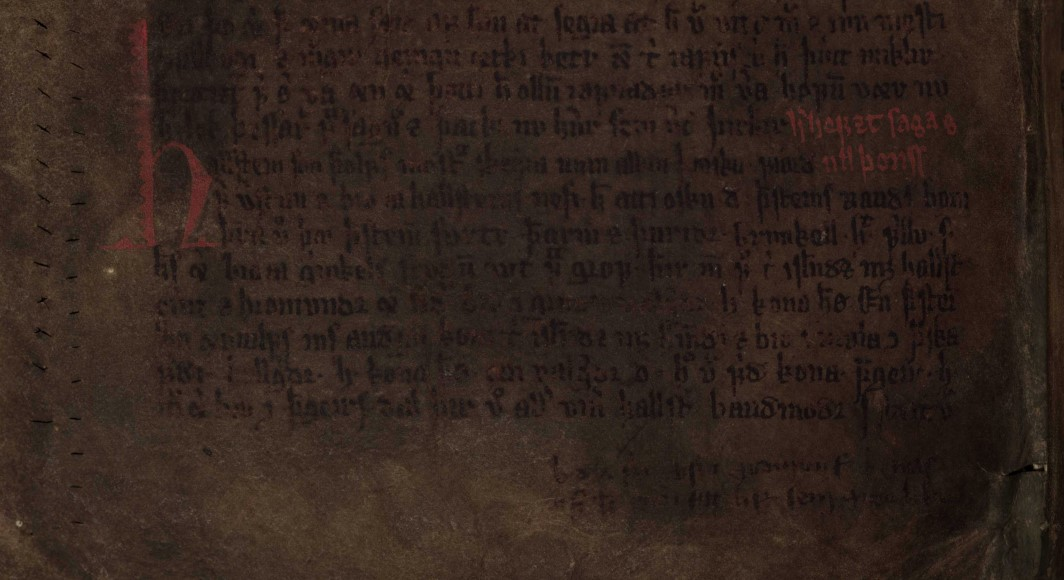
The beginning of Gull-Þóris saga in AM 561 4to, the only medieval manuscript to preserve the saga

Gull-Þóris saga (Old Norse pronunciation: [ˈɡulː-ˌθoːres ˈsɑɣɑ]; Icelandic pronunciation: [ˈkʏtl̥-ˌθouːrɪs ˈsaːɣa]), also known as Þorskfirðinga saga, is one of the sagas of Icelanders. The saga takes place in the west of Iceland during the Settlement of Iceland in the second half of the ninth century. It tells the story of Þórir Oddsson (nicknamed Gull-Þórir, lit. 'Gold-Þórir'), a chieftain in Þorskafjörður, and his dispute with his neighbour Hallr. Scholars have argued that the saga is the work of Sturla Þórðarson.

== Synopsis ==
Þórir comes to Iceland with his father, Oddr skrauti. Þórir's wife is Ingibjörg, daughter of Gísl, who settled Gilsfjörður. Later, Þórir goes raiding with Hyrningr the son of Hallr of Hofstaðir, and obtains gold in Finnmark, where he defeats some dragons in a cave north of Dumbshaf. When the men come back to Iceland, Hallr wants to get a portion of the gold on behalf of his son, although Hyrningr is satisfied with his lot. This becomes a source of controversy between Þórir and Hallr. Þórir kills both Hallr and his older son Rauðr, but is later reconciled with Hyrningr, who does not get involved in the feud. At the end of his life, Þórir hides away his gold and is rumored to have become a dragon.

== Authorship ==
There is some relationship between material in Gull-Þóris saga and the version of Landnámabók compiled by Sturla Þórðarson. Þórhallur Vilmundarson pointed out some further connections between the saga and Sturla's interests and tastes. Elín Bára Magnúsdóttir went further in affirmatively arguing that Sturla had composed the saga, based on an analysis of the vocabulary and themes of the text, which show a consistent similarity with Sturla's known works. Stylometric measurements by another team of researchers also link the saga to Sturla's works.
