= Hjaltadalur =

Valley in Skagafjörður, Iceland

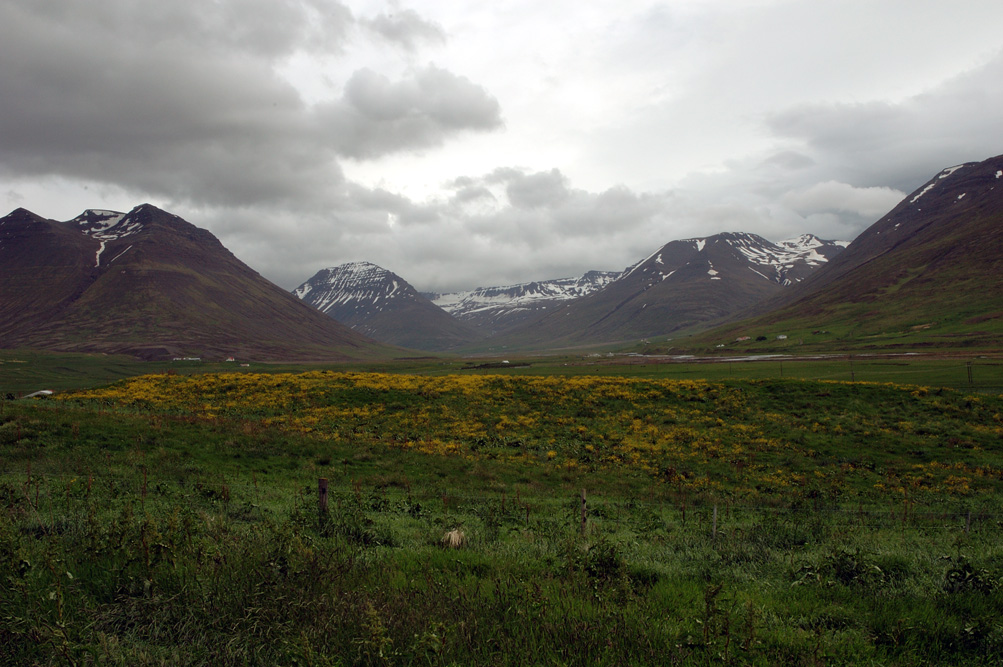
- Interior of Hjaltadalur seen from Hólar on an overcast day

Naming
- English translation: Hjalti's valley, named for the settler Hjalti Þórðarson

Geography
- Country: Iceland
- State/Province: Skagafjörður
- District: Skagafjörður (municipality)
- Population centers: Hólar, Hof in Hjaltadalur, Reykir, Neðri-Ás, Viðvík
- Coordinates: 65°43′51.85″N 19°7′47.89″W 65°40′31.318″N 19°5′43.764″W
- River: Hjaltadalsá
- Interactive map of Hjaltadalur

Hjaltadalur is a valley on the east side of Skagafjörður, Iceland that was previously a part of Hólahreppur. The majority of the valley is surrounded by 1,000–2,000-meter-tall mountains, and it intersects with various remote valleys. Hjaltadalsá river runs through the valley, originating at Hjaltadalsjökull glacier located at the head of Hjaltadalur. Several tributaries and streams flow into Hjaltadalsá.

Hjaltadalur is named after the settler Hjalti Þórðarson skálps (Hjalti, son of Þórður "the scabbard"). The Landnámabók states, "Hjalti, the son of Þórður skálpur came to Iceland and settled Hjaltadalur upon the advice of Kolbeinn and he lived at Hof; his sons were Þorvaldur and Þórður, both great men."

The bishop's residence, and later the school, in Hólar í Hjaltadal is in the middle of the valley and leaves quite an impression. The mountain overlooking Hólar is called Hólabyrða and is 1,244 meters (4,081 feet) tall. The valley's innermost town is Reykir. The area produces geothermal energy and there is an old warm water spring named Biskupslaug (Bishop's Warm Spring). The spring, however, has been filled in.

== Old Thoroughfares out of Hjaltadalur ==
Travelers frequently passed through Hólar í Hjaltadal (Hólar in Hjaltadalur) because it was the center of the church's power and of education in Iceland's northern region. Some of the main routes were:

- Hríshálsvegur from Hólar up to Blönduhlíð and over into Hegranes.
- Hjaltadalsheiði to Hörgárdalur in Eyjafjörður, a long mountain, which took significant time to traverse, but saw considerable use in past centuries.
- Héðinsskörð or Héðinsskarð to Barkárdalur in Eyjafjörður.
- Hólamannavegur via Hólamannaskarð to Barkárdalur in Eyjafjörður.
- Heljardalsheiði to Svarfaðardalur in Eyjafjörður.
- Hákambar to Ólafsfjörður.
- Down eastern Hjaltadalur to Kolkuós, and down Óslandshlíð to Hofsós or Grafarós.

== Towns in Hjaltadalur ==
There are a good many towns in Hjaltadalur. In later years, a small village was formed in Hólar around Hólar University.

On the east side of the valley are:

- Neðri-Ás, an old manor. The first church in Iceland was built in Neðri-Ás.
- Efri-Ás
- Laufskálar, previously Brekkukot (or Grafarkot)
- Víðines, where the Battle of Víðines was fought in 1208
- Hólar in Hjaltadalur, bishop's residence and school campus
- Hof in Hjaltadalur, the homestead of Hjalti Þórðarson

On the west side of the valley are:

- Reykir in Hjaltadalur
- Hvammur in Hjaltadalur
- Hrafnhóll
- Hlíð in Hjaltadalur, previously Hrappsstaðir
- Kálfsstaðir
- Kjarvalsstaðir in Hjaltadalur
- Nautabú in Hjaltadalur
- Ingveldarstaðir in Hjaltadalur
- Skúfsstaðir
- Garðakot in Hjaltadalur, previously Garðar

All these towns were located in Hólahreppur, but the following towns in Viðvíkursveit can be considered part of Hjaltadalur because of the topography:

- Hringver, later taken over by someone else and now called Dalsmynni
- Viðvík, church site, homestead of Öndóttur kráka Erlingsson
