= Skefilsstaðahreppur =

Former municipality in Skagafjörður, Iceland

- Hreppur
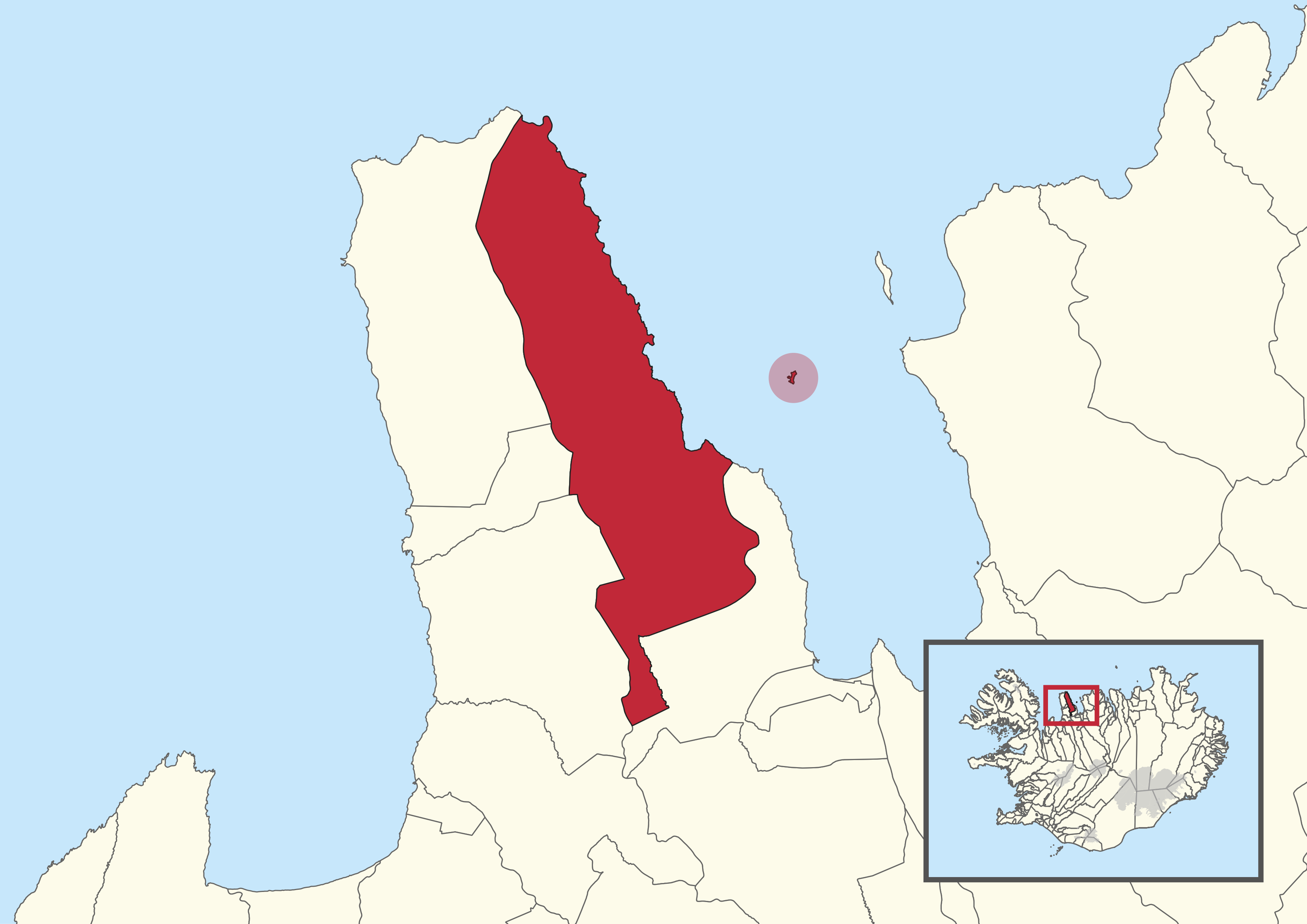
- Skefilsstaðahreppur
- Country: Iceland
- County: Skagafjörður (municipality)
- Formation of Skagafjörður (municipality): June 6, 1988
- Named for: The town of Skefilsstaði
- Boroughs: Towns
- Time zone: UTC+0

Skefilsstaðahreppur was a hreppur, an old Icelandic municipality, in Skagafjörður County, Iceland, on the east side of the Skagi peninsula. It is named after the town Skefilsstaðir.

== Geography ==
The outer part of Laxárdalur valley is located to the south of Skagi. A tall mountain named Hrafnagilsfjall is between the Laxárdalur and Hallárdalur valleys, the next valley to the west, in Húnavatnssýsla. Tindastóll mountain is to the east of Laxárdalur, and the mountain continues north to the ocean on the western side of Skagafjörður. The Laxá river, from which the valley takes its name, runs the full length of the valley.

Reykjaströnd leads along the fjord from Tindastóll inland to the Gönguskarðsá river. The river is named after Gönguskörð.

Kolugafjall mountain in Húnavatnssýsla county is on the border between Norðurárdalur valley in Húnavatnssýsla and Gönguskörð. Skefilsstaðahreppur had two areas within its borders that were naturally separated—Laxárdalur valley and Skagi. According to the old hreppur border, Sauðárhreppur was to the southeast, while Skefilsstaðahreppur ran all the way to the ocean to the north and northeast. To the west of the sea was Vindhælishreppur in Húnavatnssýsla county. The old hreppur parliament was in Skefilsstaðir in Skagi.

== Land sales ==
Land sales in Skefilsstaðahreppur are recorded in the 1802 sale of Hólastólsjarðir, including the properties that belonged to the ruling entity sold that year. The names of the estates include cost, manorial dues, kúgildi (an archaic currency based on the worth of cattle), and asking prices. Records include the sales of land and respective prices for: Hraun, Þangskáli, Kelduvík, Neðranes, Malland, Keta, Kleif, Lágmúli, Hvalnes, Brókarlækur, Selnes, Selá, Hóll, Sœvarland, and Þorbjargarstaðir.

== Transportation and old thoroughfares ==
There are some old roads from Laxárdalur to nearby towns.

- South of Laxárdalur, from Laxárdalsheiði, which is south of Tindastóll and heading east through Gönguskörð to Sauðárkrókur. There is now a relatively easy road to travel on to get to Sauðákrókur.
- A winter road to Kolugafjall mountain between the Laxá and Kallá rivers.
- Over Þverárfjall mountain, down Norðurárdalur leading to Blönduós, or along Laxárdalsheiði to Sauðárkrókur.
- A route called Skíðastaðavegur from Illugastaðir along Engjadalur, west of Sandfell, down Hallárdalur valley to Skagastrandir.
- Likely the oldest of the roads, leading from the western part of Laxárdalur valley, over Hafragilsfjall mountain, and over Laxá river along Skíðastaðir.
- A dangerous and, therefore, rarely used road running from Sævarlandi along the coast north of Tindastóll heading inland along the mountains to the east to Reykir in Reykjaströnd (Reykir á Reykjaströnd). This was only passable at high tide when the seas were calm. Over the years, bridges were built and roads were more frequently traveled, making it safer. This made car travel to the area more accessible.

== Population ==
The number of inhabitants in this region has decreased over the past decades. The following table shows the population development from 1951 to 1997. As the table shows, there were only 45 residents of the hreppur one year before the Skagafjörður unification. Of the 45, there were 23 men and 22 women.

Skefilsstaðahreppur Population
Year	Population
1951	105
1953	85
1957	109
1960	101
1965	88
1968	79
1970	77
1973	66
1975	62
1977	65
1980	61
1997	45

== Hreppur Council ==
The last Skefilsstaðahreppur council was elected in the hreppur committee election on May 28, 1994, in which Bjarni Egilsson, Brynja Ólafsdóttir, Guðmundur Vignir Vilhelmsson, Hreinn Guðjónsson, and Jón Stefánsson were voted into office.

=== Council chairs ===
- 1874–1879 Gísli Jónsson in Hvammur and later Herjólfsstaðir
- 1879–1880 Sigurður Jónsson in Hvalnes
- 1880–1884 Séra Ísleifur Einarsson in Hvammur
- 1884–1890 Gunnar Gunnarsson in Hafragil
- 1890–1901 Séra Sigfús Jónsson in Hvammur
- 1901–1902 Pétur Björnsson in Gauksstaðir
- 1902–1906 Séra Björn L. Blöndal in Hvammur
- 1906–1919 Jóhann Sigurðsson in Sævarland
- 1919–1928 Séra Arnór Árnason in Hvammur
- 1928–1954 Steinn L. Sveinsson in Hraun
- 1954–1962 Guðmundur Árnason in Þorbjargarstaðir
- 1962–1970 Séra Finnbogi Kristjánsson in Hvammur
- 1970–1990 Lárus Björnsson in Neðra-Nes
- 1990–1998 Bjarni Egilsson in Hvalnes

== Skagafjörður County unification ==
On June 6, 1988, Skefilsstaðahreppur joined ten other local governments to form Skagafjörður county: Fljótahreppur, Sauðárkrókur, Skarðshreppur, Staðarhreppur, Seyluhreppur, Lýtingsstaðahreppur, Rípurhreppur, Viðvíkurhreppur, Hólarhreppur, and Hofshreppur. The municipality of Skefilsstaðahreppur was, from a fiscal standing, the best of all the Skagafjörður hreppurs in 1997, the year before the unification. At that time, the hreppur did not have any debts and, in fact, had a per capita balance of 364,000 kronur. Skefilsstaðahreppur was named “by far the richest municipality”.
