= Skarðshreppur =

Former municipality in Skagafjörður, Iceland

- Hreppur
- Country: Iceland
- County: Skagafjörður
- Unification of Skagafjörður (municipality): June 6, 1998
- Named for: Skarð farm in Gönguskörð
- Towns: Reykjaströnd, Gönguskörð, Borgarsveit, Skarð, Reykir, Ingveldarstaður, Veðramót, Hólakot, Gil, Meyjarland, Sjávarborg, Fagranes
- Time zone: UTC+0

Skarðshreppur was a hreppur, an old Icelandic municipality, in the west of Skagafjörður county, Iceland, named for the Skarðfarm in Gönguskörð, located at the base of Tindastóll Mountain.

Skarðshreppur and Sauðárkrókur were created in 1907 when Sauðárhreppur was divided in two.

Skarðshreppur had three districts:

1. Reykjaströnd, the furthest out, at the base of the east side of Tindastóll Mountain
2. Gönguskörð, a mountain valley south of Tindastóll
3. Borgarsveit, the settlement south of Sauðárkrókur

On June 6, 1998, Skarðshreppur joined ten other local governments to form Skagafjörður: Skefilsstaðahreppur, Sauðárkrókur, Rípurhreppur, Staðarhreppur, Seyluhreppur, Lýtingsstaðahreppur, Viðvíkurhreppur, Hólahreppur, Hofshreppur, and Fljótahreppur.

== Hreppur council ==
The last Skarðshreppur council was elected in the hreppur committee election on May 28, 1994, in which Andrés Helgason, Jón Eiríksson, Sigrún Aadnegaard, Sigurður Guðjónsson, and Úlfar Sveinsson were voted into office.

=== Council chairs ===
- 1874–1879 Sveinn Sölvason in Skarð
- 1879–1880 Þorleifur Jónasson in Reykir
- 1880–1883 Benedikt Sölvason in Ingveldarstaður
- 1883–1886 Þorleifur Jónasson in Reykir
- 1886–1889 Benedikt Sölvason in Ingveldarstaðar
- 1889–1895 Björn Jónsson in Veðramót
- 1895–1913 Benedikt Sölvason in Ingveldarstaður
- 1913–1922 Sigurjón Jónasson in Hólakot
- 1922–1931 Sigurður Á. Björnsson in Veðramót
- 1931–1933 Eiríkur Björnsson in Gil
- 1933–1946 Stefán Sigurfinnsson in Meyjarland
- 1946–1948 Árni Daníelsson in Sjávarborg
- 1948–1950 Ólafur Lárusson in Skarð
- 1950–1954 Stefán Sigurfinnsson in Meyjarland
- 1954–1958 Haraldur Árnason in Sjávarborg
- 1958–1961 Gunnar Guðmundsson in Reykir
- 1961–1962 Haraldur Árnason in Sjávarborg
- 1962–1966 Stefán Sigurfinnsson in Meyjarland
- 1966–1970 Jón Eiríksson in Fagranes
- 1970–1998 Úlfar Sveinsson in Ingveldarstaður
