= Hofshreppur (Skagafjörður) =

Former municipality in Skagafjörður, Iceland

Hofshreppur Höfðastrandarhreppur
- Hreppur
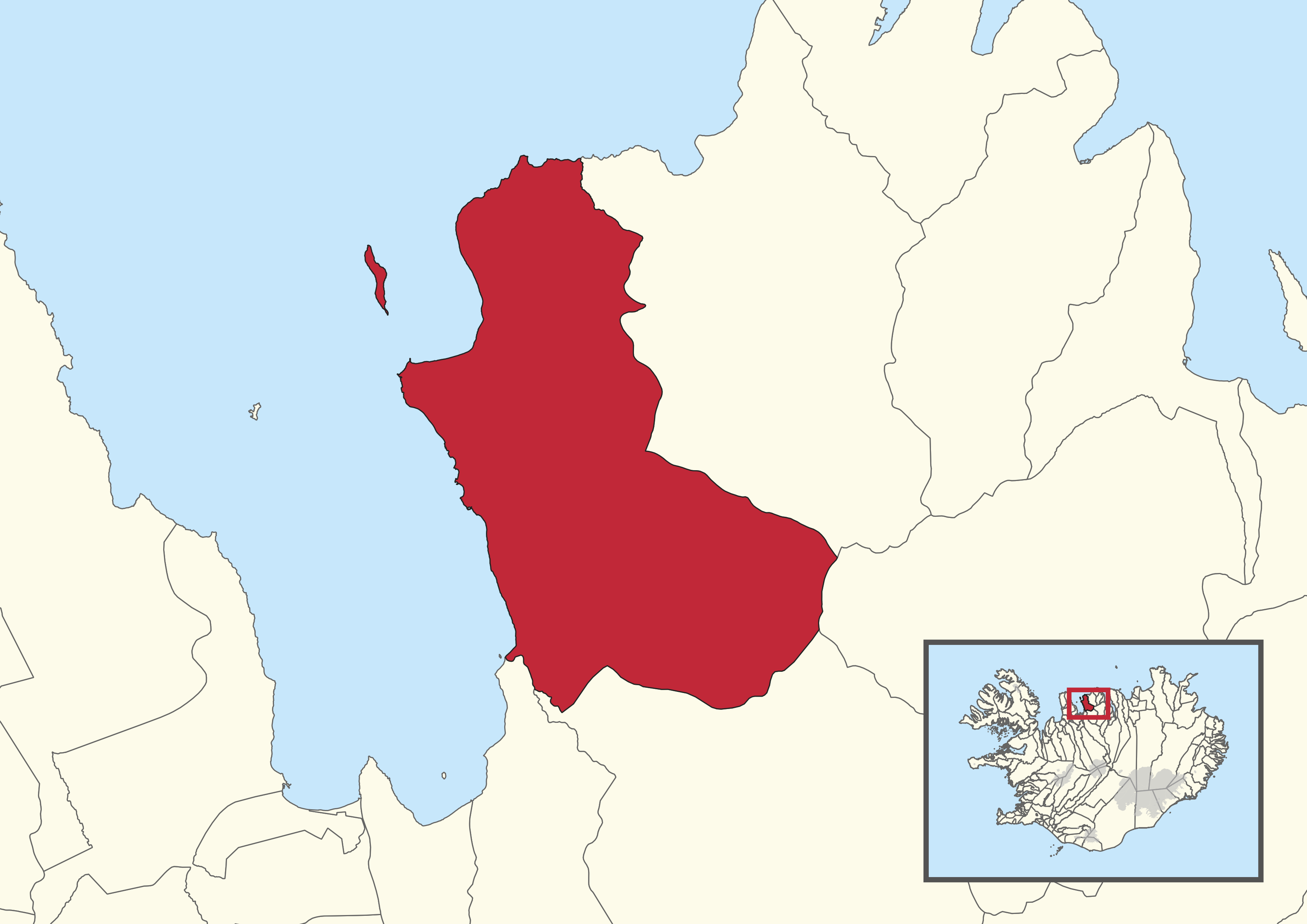
- Hofshreppur from 1990 to 1998
- Country: Iceland
- County: Skagafjörður
- Unification of Skagafjörður (municipality): June 6, 1998
- Named for: The church site Hof in Höfðaströnd
- Time zone: UTC+0
- Became a part of Skagafjörður (municipality) in 1998

Hofshreppur, previously Höfðastrandarhreppur, was a hreppur, an old Icelandic municipality, in Skagafjörður county, Iceland, located on the east side of the main part of the fjord. It was named after the church site Hof in Höfðaströnd.

The old trading post Hofsós was made into its own hreppur on January 1, 1948. On June 19, 1990, Hofshreppur and Fellshreppur, located to the north, merged into a single municipality. Hofshreppur then comprised land all the way north to Fljót.

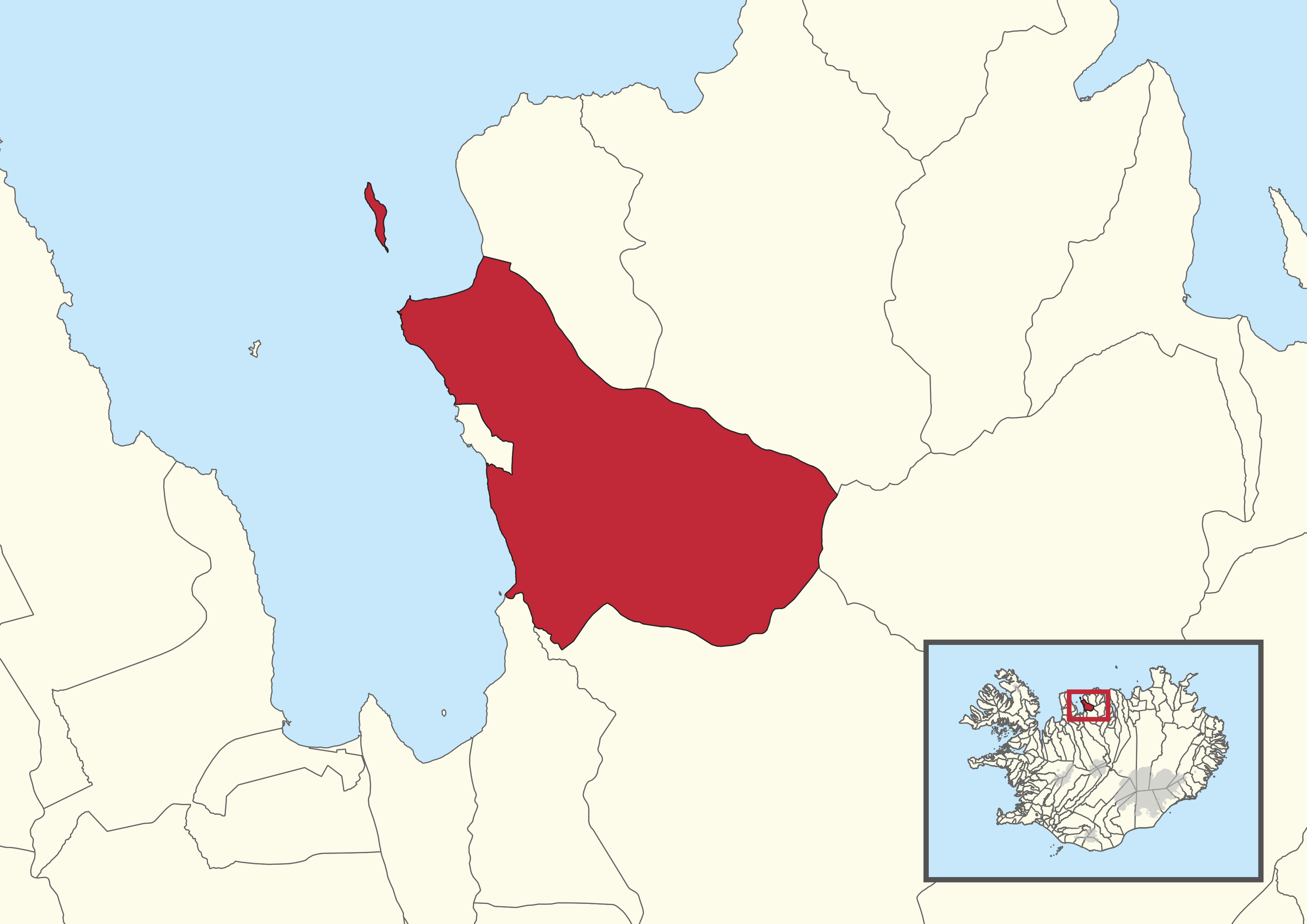
Hofshreppur from 1948 to 1990

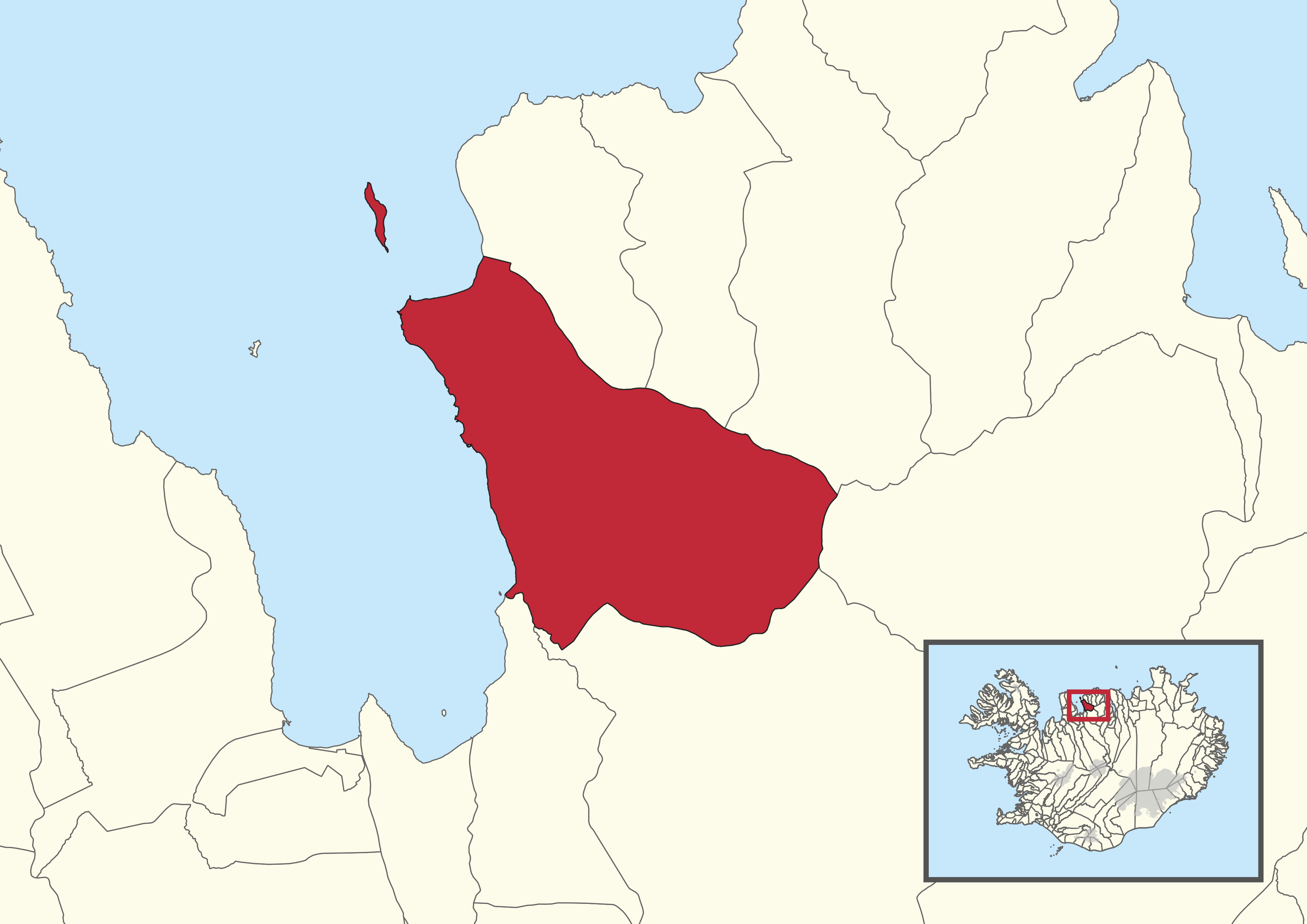
Hofshreppur until 1947

On June 6, 1998, Hofshreppur joined ten other local governments to form Skagafjörður county: Skefilsstaðahreppur, Sauðárkrókur, Skarðshreppur, Staðarhreppur, Seyluhreppur, Lýtingsstaðahreppur, Rípurhreppur, Viðvíkurhreppur, Hólahreppur, and Fljótahreppur.
