= Lýtingsstaðahreppur =

Former municipality in Skagafjörður, Iceland

- Hreppur
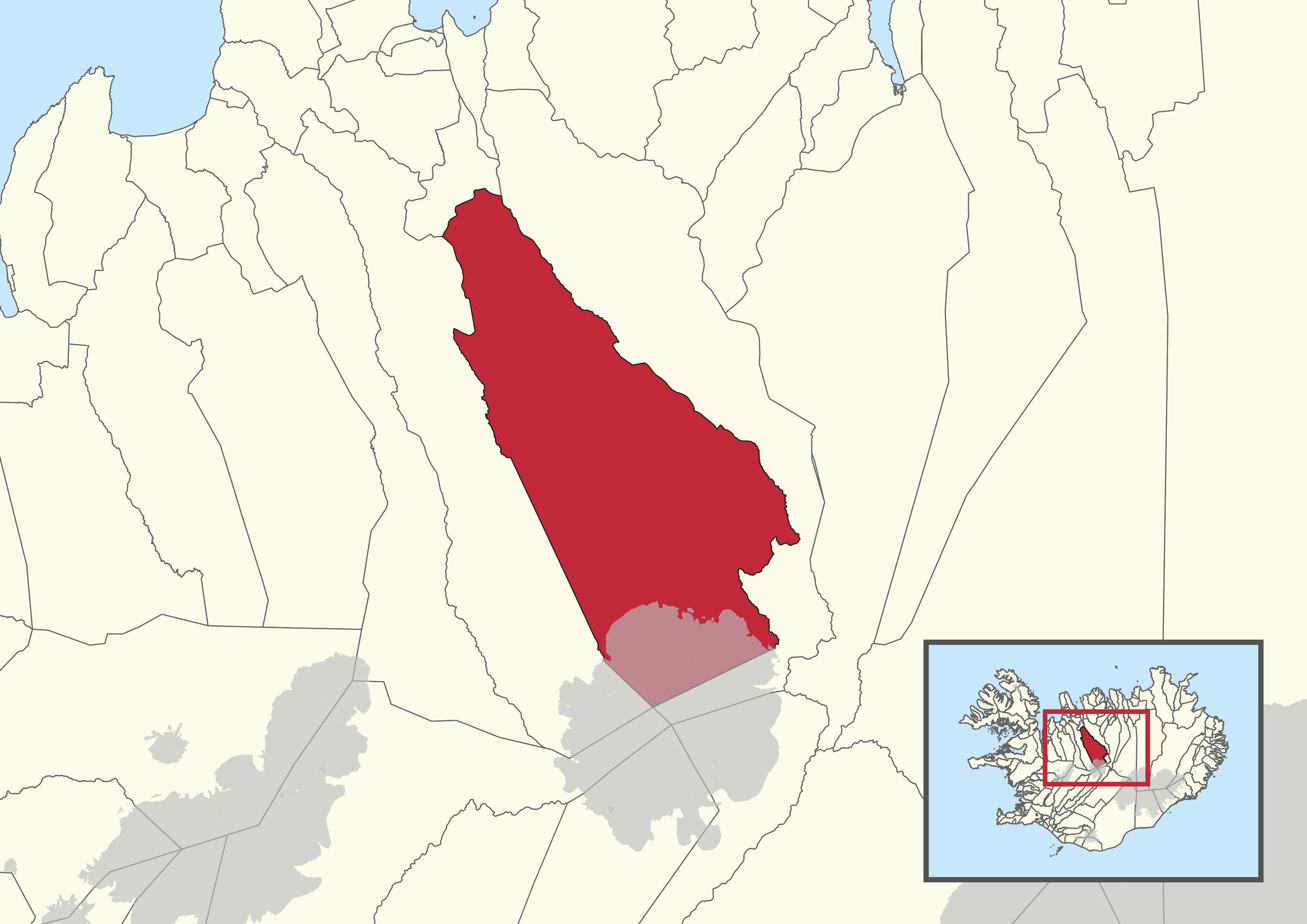
- Lýtingsstaðahreppur
- Country: Iceland
- County: Skagafjörður
- Unification of Skagafjörður (municipality): June 6, 1998
- Named for: Lýtingsstaðir farm in Tungusveit
- Towns: List: Efribyggð, Neðribyggð, Bústaðir, Varmalækur, Steinsstaðir, Litladalskot, Ýrafell, Goðdalir, Hamarsgerð, Skíðastaðir, Nautabú, Reykir, Álfgerisvöllur, Breið, Tunguháls, Sveinsstaðir, Brúnastaðir, Sölvanes
- Time zone: UTC+0

Lýtingsstaðahreppur was a hreppur, an old Icelandic municipality, in the interior of Skagafjörður County, Iceland, located to the west of the Héraðsvötn. It was named after the Lýtingsstaðir farm in Tungusveit. The hreppur spanned from the Krithóll farm, just south of Vatnsskarð, and all the way south to the watershed in the highlands, where it reaches the boundary of what is considered the "north" and "south" of Iceland.

There were several districts in the interior of Lýtingsstaðahreppur:

- Efribyggð and Neðribyggð are west of the Svartá (“Black River”) but north of Mælifellshnjúkur, at the base of Hamraheiði, which was previously named Fremribyggð.
- East of the Svartá and heading south towards the Tunguháls farm is an area called Tungusveit, which becomes Vesturdalur to the south.
- West of Vesturdalur is Svartárdalur and east of Vesturdalur is Austurdalur, the majority of which is actually located in Akrahreppur, but the Bústaðir farm was in Lýtingsstaðahreppur.

The area by the Héraðsvötn—across from Úlfsstaðir, Kúskerpi, and Uppsalir in Blönduhlíð—is called Dalspláss.

Agriculture is the primary industry in the area, but many people also work in the service sector. A small urban area has formed at two places within the old hreppur, one in Varmalækur in Neðribyggð and another in Steinsstaðir in Tungusveit. Some places in the hreppur have geothermal heating.

There are churches in Reykir, Mælifell, and Goðdalir.

On June 6, 1998, Lýtingsstaðahreppur joined ten other local governments to form Skagafjörður: Skefilsstaðahreppur, Sauðárkrókur, Skarðshreppur, Seyluhreppur, Staðarhreppur, Rípurhreppur, Viðvíkurhreppur, Hólahreppur, Hofshreppur, and Fljótahreppur.

== Hreppur council ==
The last Lýtingsstaðahreppur council was elected in the hreppur committee election on May 28, 1994, in which Björn Ófeigsson, Elín Sigurðardóttir, Eyjólfur Pálsson, Indriði Stefánsson, and Rósa Björnsdóttir were voted into office.

=== Council chairs ===
- 1874–1876 Ólafur Guðmundsson in Litladalskot
- 1876–1877 Indriði Árnason in Ýrafell
- 1877–1883 Séra Zophanías Halldórsson in Goðdalir
- 1873–1884 Indriði Árnason in Ýrafell
- 1884–1887 Árni Einarsson in Hamarsgerð
- 1887–1889 Indriði Árnason in Ýrafell
- 1889–1892 Pálmi Pétursson in Skíðastaðir
- 1892–1895 Árni Einarsson in Nautabú
- 1895–1898 Páll Ólafsson in Litladalskot
- 1898–1907 Árni Einarsson in Reykir
- 1907–1920 Ólafur Briem in Álfgerisvöllur
- 1920–1938 Tómas Pálsson in Bústaðir
- 1938–1946 Guðmundur Eiríksson in Breið
- 1946–1958 Guðjón Jónsson in Tunguháls
- 1958–1970 Björn Egilsson in Sveinsstaðir
- 1970–1982 Marinó Sigurðsson in Álfgerisvöllur
- 1982–1987 Sigurður Sigurðsson in Brúnastaðir
- 1987–1998 Elín Sigurðardóttir in Sölvanes
