= Viðvíkurhreppur =

Former municipality in Skagafjörður, Iceland

- Hreppur
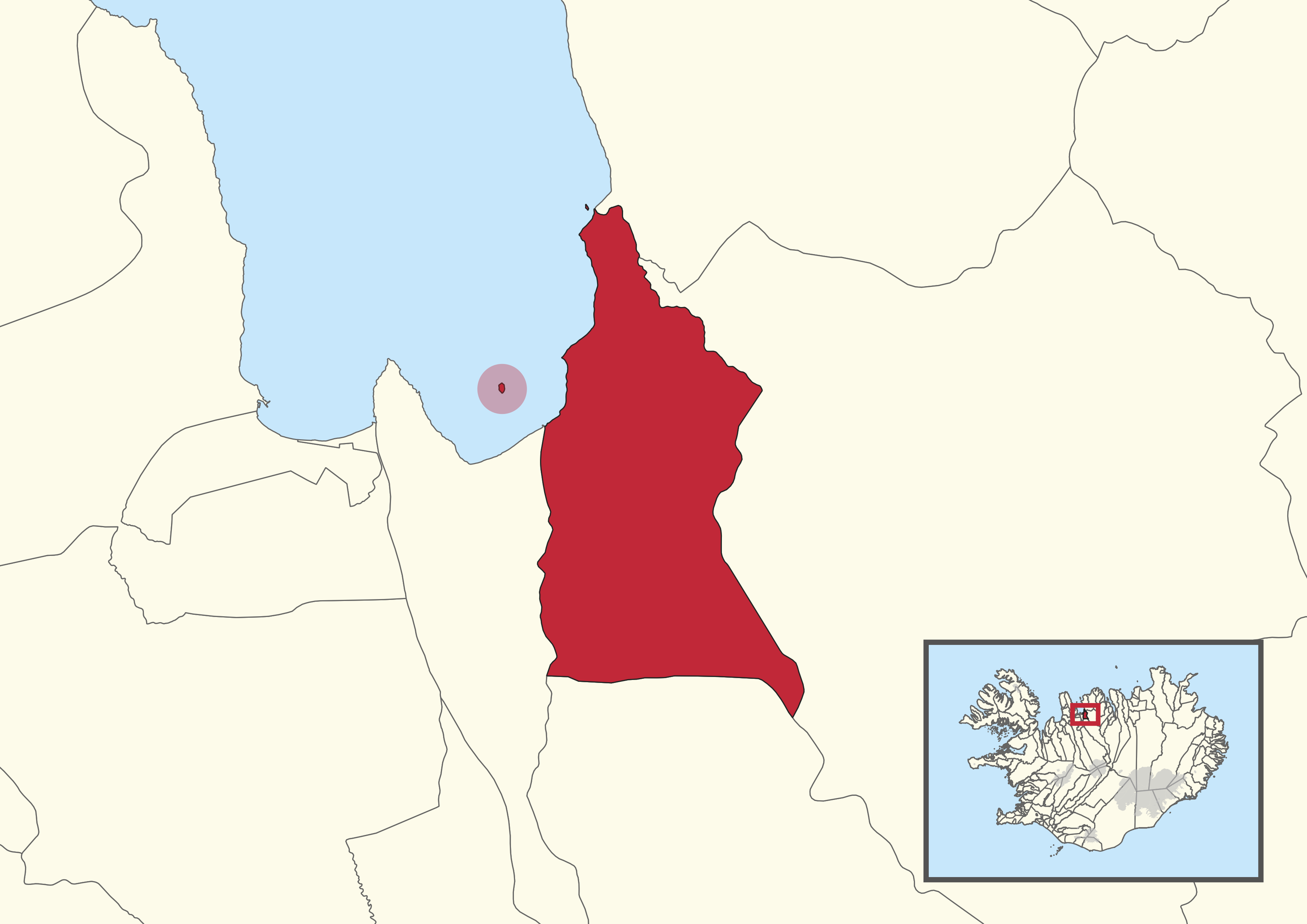
- Country: Iceland
- County: Skagafjörður
- Unification of Skagafjörður (municipality): June 6, 1998
- Named for: Viðvík, a church site
- Towns: List: Ásgeirsbrekka, Hofsstaðir, Litlahóll, Syðri-Hofdalir, Hofstaðasel, Viðvík, Vatnsleysa, Kolkuós, Narfastaðir, Kýrholt, Enni, Brimnes, Bakki, Hofstaðapláss
- Time zone: UTC+0

Viðvíkurhreppur a hreppur, an old Icelandic municipality, in between the Héraðsvötn and Hjaltadalsá in Skagafjörður County, Iceland. It is named after the church site Viðvík.

On June 6, 1998, Viðvíkurhreppur joined ten other local governments to form Skagafjörður County: Skefilsstaðahreppur, Sauðárkrókur, Skarðshreppur, Staðarhreppur, Seyluhreppur, Lýtingsstaðahreppur, Rípurhreppur, Hólahreppur, Hofshreppur, and Fljótahreppur.

== Hreppur council ==
The last Viðvíkurhreppur council was elected in the hreppur committee election on May 28, 1994, in which Brynleifur Siglaugsson, Halldór Jónasson, Halldór Steingrímsson, Haraldur Þór Jóhannsson, and Trausti Kristjánsson were voted into office.

=== Council chairs ===
- 1874–1877 Björn Pálmason in Ásgeirsbrekka
- 1877–1880 Sigurður Pétursson in Hofsstaðir
- 1880–1883 Aðalsteinn Steinsson in Litlahóll
- 1883–1886 Björn Pálmason in Ásgeirsbrekka
- 1886–1890 Guðmundur Pétursson in Syðri-Hofdalir
- 1890–1892 Þorgrímur Ásgrímsson in Hofstaðasel
- 1892–1894 Björn Pétursson in Hofsstaðir
- 1894–1904 Séra Zophonías Halldórsson in Viðvík
- 1904–1910 Jósef J. Björnsson in Vatnsleysa
- 1910–1919 Hartmann Ásgrímsson in Kolkuós
- 1919–1922 Jóhannes Björnsson in Hofsstaðir
- 1922–1925 Björn Björnsson in Narfastaðir
- 1925–1931 Bessi Gíslason in Kýrholt
- 1931–1932 Björn Símonarson in Enni
- 1932–1942 Gunnlaugur Björnsson in Brimnes
- 1942–1958 Sigurmon Hartmannsson in Kolkuós
- 1958–1962 Sverrir Björnsson in Viðvík
- 1962–1982 Björn Gunnlaugsson in Brimnes
- 1982–1990 Bjarni Maronsson in Ásgeirsbrekka
- 1990–1994 Birgir Haraldsson in Bakki
- 1994–1998 Haraldur Þór Jóhannsson in Enni
