= Fagranes (Skagafjörður) =

Farm in Skagafjörður, Iceland

Coordinates: 65°48′26″N 19°40′53″W

- Farm
- Interactive map of Fagranes
- Country: Iceland
- County: Skagafjörður
- District: Reykjaströnd

Fagranes is a farm in the Reykjaströnd district in Skagafjörður, Iceland, off the east of Tindastóll mountain. It was the location of a church and vicarage, but the church was decommissioned in 1892 and the vicarage moved to Sauðárkrókur. The church had an old pulpit thought to be from the time of bishop Guðbrandur Þorláksson. It is now in the National Museum of Iceland.

Jón Eiríksson, called Drangeyjarjarl (the Earl of Drangey), now lives in Fagranes and has long made use of Drangey's resources and maintained its landing site. He regularly sails to the island with tourists and has built a landing site in Reykir. He also oversaw the construction of Grettislaug in Reykir in 1992. There is a monument to Grettir sterki ("the strong") Ásmundarson in Fagranes. Grettir himself is said to have been buried in the graveyard at the church in Reykir—or at least his body is there. Þorbjörn öngull 'the fish hook' took his head.
