= Sauðá =

River in Skagafjörður, Iceland

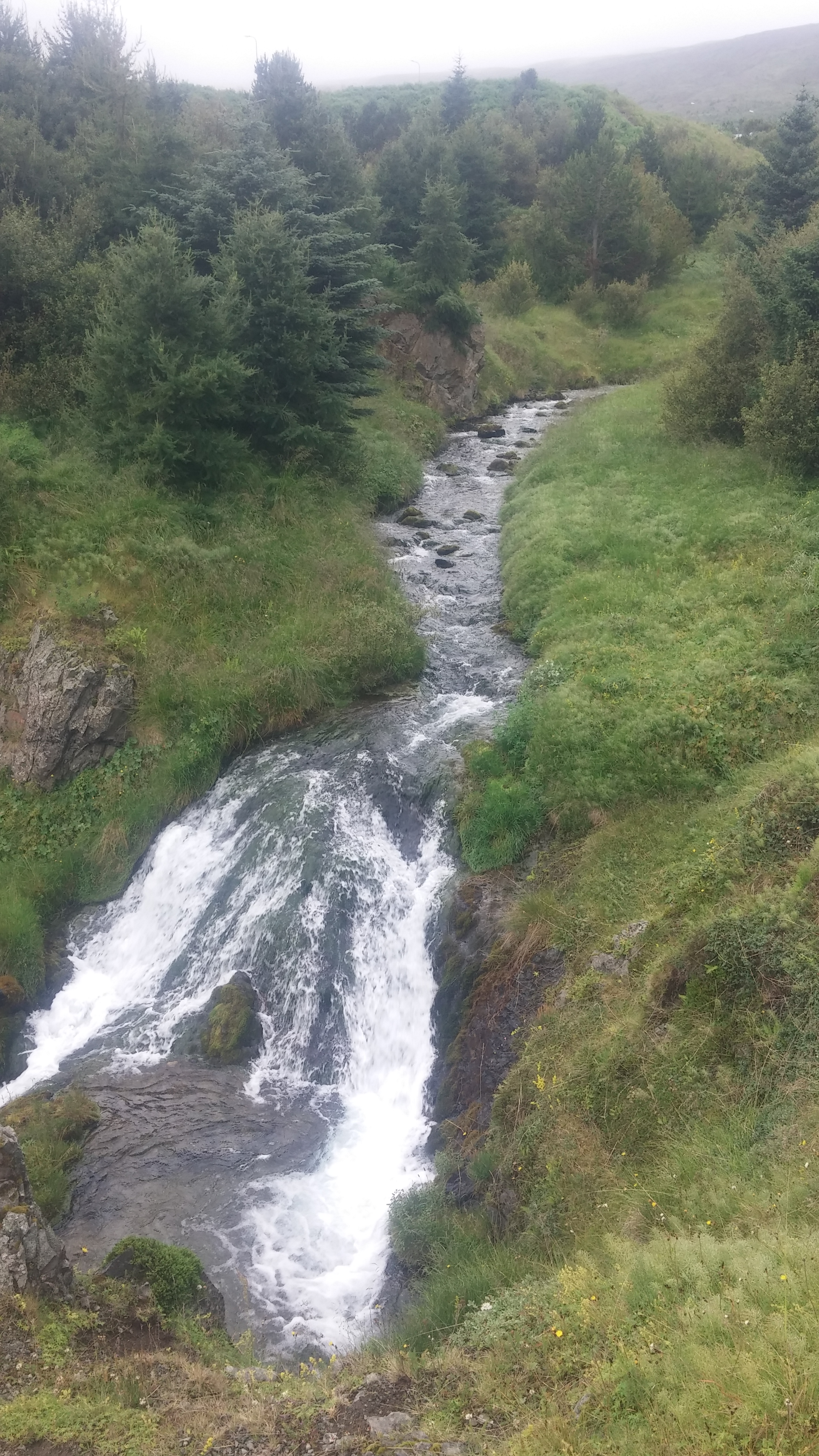
- The Sauðá river runs through Litliskógur and then hooks along the farmstead of Sauðárkrókur, which takes its name from the river.

Location
- Country: Iceland
- Region: Skagafjörður

Physical characteristics
- Source: Molduxi
  - coordinates: 65°41′42″N 19°40′37″W
- Mouth
  - coordinates: 65°44′15″N 19°36′52″W

Basin features
- Cities: Sauðárkrókur

The Sauðá river is a spring creek on the western side of Skagafjörður, Iceland. Sauðárkrókur takes its name from the river.

== Background ==
Sauðá originates from Molduxi mountain, south of Sauðárkrókur, and runs through the town in Sauðárgil ravine. The Sauðá used to run to the north when it reached level ground, but now the town's sports field and swimming pool are there. From there, it flows to the sea along several old towns. The river has flooded often, which caused damage, and in 1950, the river was redirected to the east toward Borgarmýri and Tjarnartjörn.

In the Sauðárgil ravine, there is a forested area called Litliskógur. There were lots of small swimming pools built there in 1912, where water was pumped into lakes and that were used for swimming lessons for a long time. Some ways up there is a dam in the river that was built in 1930 when the river began to be used for hydropower. The water is now pumped to an industrial establishment in Sauðárkrókur.

South of the Sauðá river, there used to be a town of the same name that served as the seat of the local government, then called Sauðárhreppur, but in 1907, it was divided into Sauðárhreppur and Skarðshreppur.
