= Sauðárkrókskirkja =

Church in Sauðárkrókur, Iceland

Sauðárkrókur Church
- Sauðárkrókskirkja
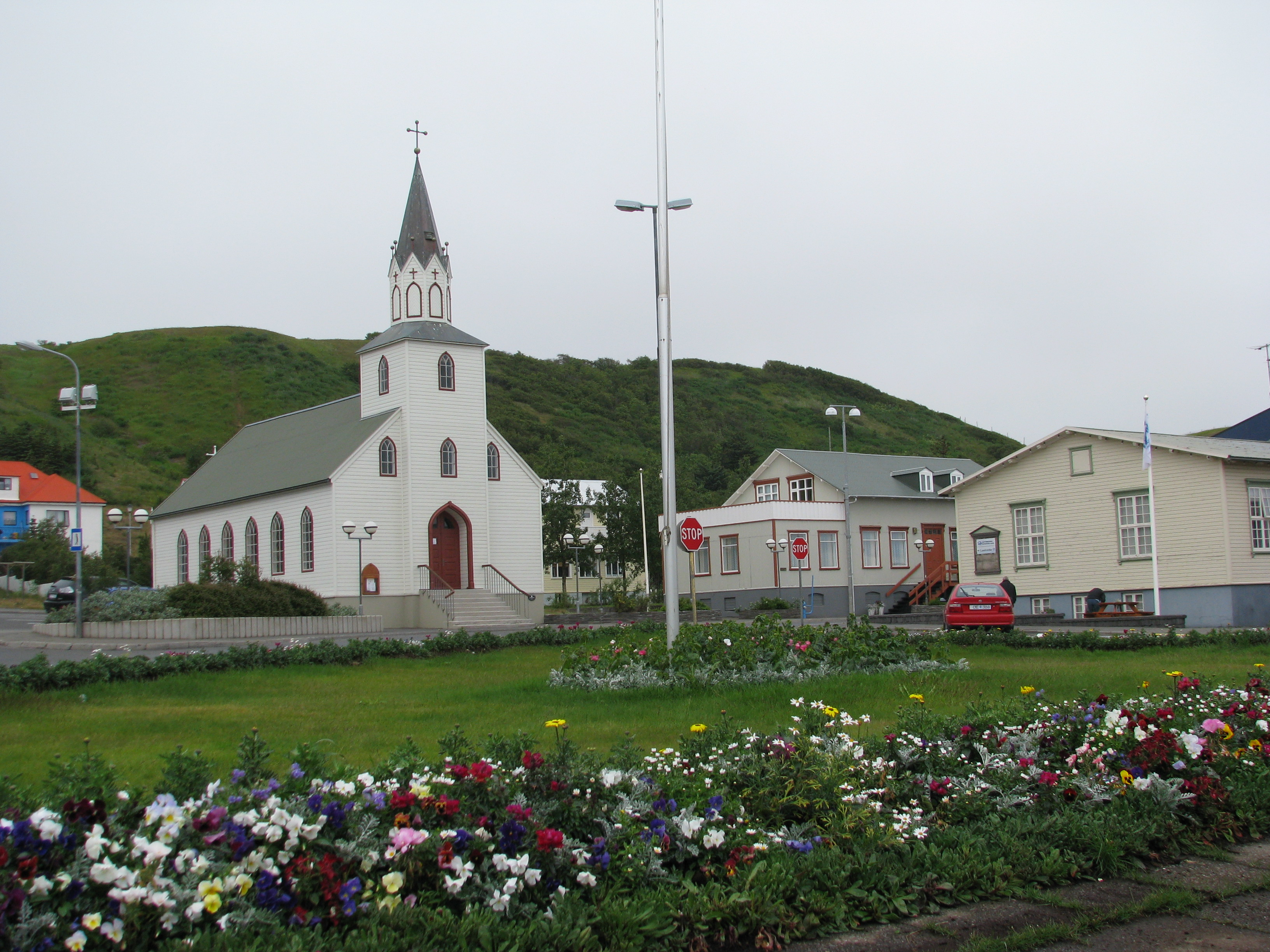
- Sauðárkrókskirkja
- Sauðárkrókur Church
- 65°44′59.100″N 19°39′2.196″W
- Tradition: Christianity
- Website: https://www.saudarkrokskirkja.is/

History
- Consecrated: December 9, 1892

Sauðárkrókskirkja (Sauðárkrókur church) is a church in Sauðárkrókur, Iceland that was consecrated on December 9, 1892. The church parish was formed as the result of combining the Sjávarborg and Fagranes parishes, and the parish spans Reykjaströnd, Gönguskörð, Sauðárkrókur, and Borgarsveit.

The church was enlarged in 1957 and 1958; additionally, the steeple was rebuilt and a concrete foundation was laid for the basement. For the church's 100-year anniversary, it was largely rebuilt for a third time and extended by around four meters towards the west.

The church's altarpiece is from 1895 and was made by the Danish painter Anker Lund. The chandeliers in the nave were oil lamps that were converted to electric lights in 1923. There are stained glass windows in the church.

The cemetery is in Nafirnar and overlooks the farm. The oldest part of the cemetery dates to 1893.
