= Fljótahreppur =

Former municipality in Skagafjörður, Iceland

- Hreppur
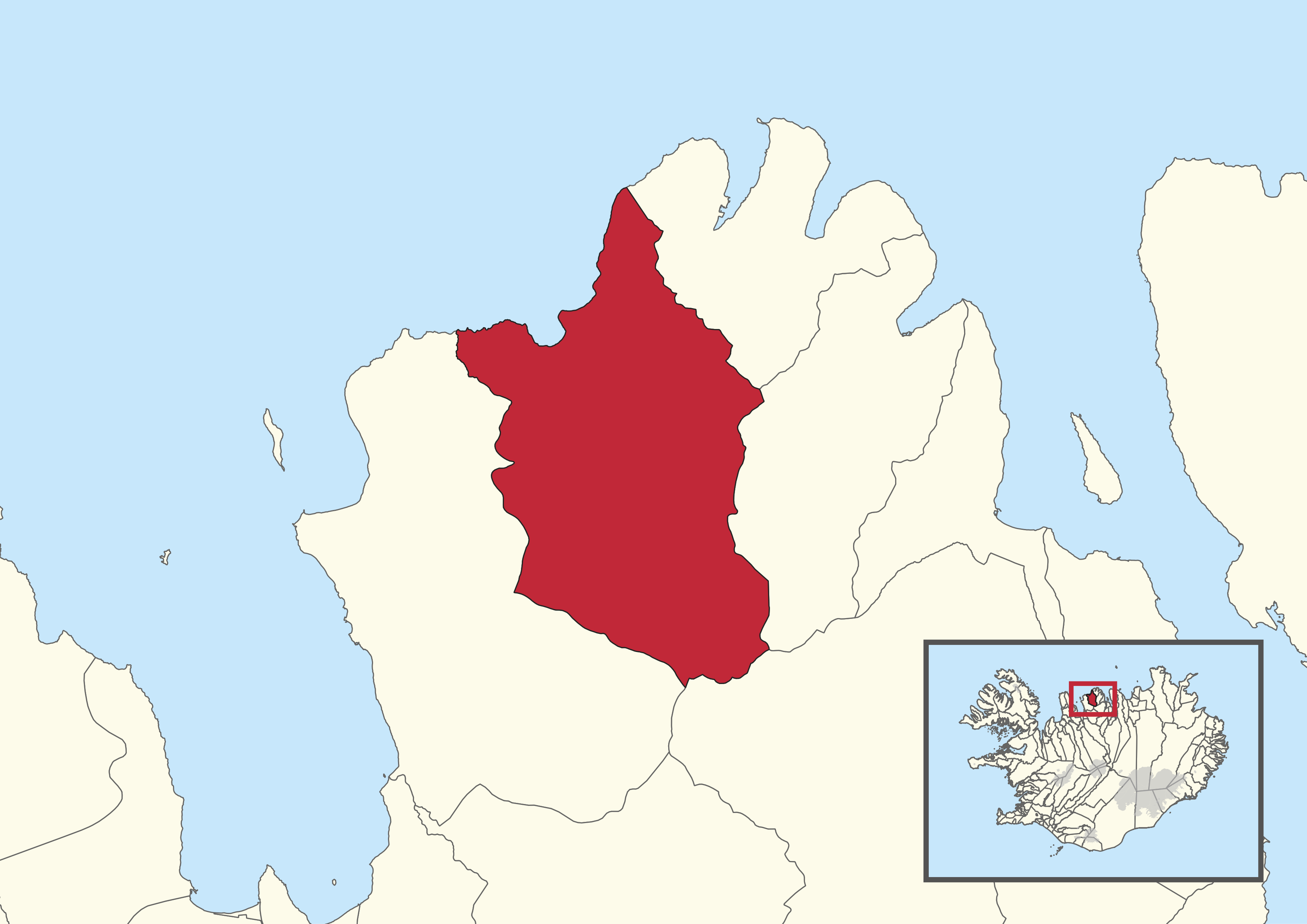
- Fljótahreppur
- Country: Iceland
- County: Skagafjörður
- Unification of Skagafjörður (municipality): June 6, 1998
- Named for: Fljót
- Time zone: UTC+0

Fljótahreppur was a hreppur, an old Icelandic municipality, located in the northernmost part of Skagafjörður County, Iceland and to the east of the fjord itself. Fljótahreppur is named after the district of Fljót.

Fljótahreppur was split into Haganeshreppur and Holtshreppur in 1898 (or possibly 1899) but they were reunited under the same name on April 1, 1988.

On June 6, 1988, Fljótahreppur joined ten other local governments to form Skagafjörður county: Skefilsstaðahreppur, Sauðárkrókur, Skarðshreppur, Staðarhreppur, Seyluhreppur, Lýtingsstaðahreppur, Rípurhreppur, Viðvíkurhreppur, Hólahreppur, and Hofshreppur.

== Hreppur council ==
The last Fljótahreppur council was elected in the hreppur committee election on May 28, 1994, in which Guðrún Halldórsdóttir, Gunnar Steingrímsson, Haukur Ástvaldsson, Hermann Jónsson, and Örn Þórarinsson were voted into office.
