= Borgarsveit =

District in Skagafjörður, Iceland

- District
- Interactive map of Borgarsveit
- Coordinates: 65°41′24.464″N 19°37′3.475″W
- Country: Iceland
- County: Skagafjörður County

Borgarsveit is a district in Skagafjörður, Iceland, located a little farther in on the western head of the fjord, spanning from the western mouth of the Héraðsvötn to Sauðárkrókur, and up to the southern end of the farm Gil, where Staðarsveit begins. There is a sandy beach by the ocean called Borgarsandur, and the area is now largely overgrown with vegetation. The Sauðárkrókur Airport is also located in Borgarsveit.

The area is named after the church site Sjávarborg, which is situated on a rocky hill in the middle of a plain a short way from Borgarsandur. To the west is the lake Áshildarholtsvatn, and at the end of that is a hot spring from which Hitaveita Sauðárkróks, the Sauðárkrókur heating utility, draws power. The mountain over this area is called Molduxi.

Borgarsveit previously belonged to Skarðshreppur, but is now a part of Skagafjörður County.
