= Hofstaðapláss =

District in Skagafjörður, Iceland

Hofstaðapláss Hofstaðabyggð
- District
- Country: Iceland
- County: Skagafjörður
- Hreppur: Viðvíkurhreppur
- Named for: Hofstaður church

Hofstaðapláss or Hofstaðabyggð is a district in eastern Skagafjörður, Iceland, named after the church site Hofstaður. It belonged to Viðvíkurhreppur before the region's municipalities united to form Skagafjörður County and it is often considered a part of Viðvíkursveit county. Hofstaðapláss starts where Blönduhlíð (or Brekknapláss) ends near the Kyrfisá river, between Ytri-Brekkur and Svaðastaðir up to the Gljúfurá river. To the west, the area extends to the Héraðsvötn, where there the farms Syðri- and Ytri-Hofdalir (Southern and Outer Hofdalir) are, and a little further down below the Héraðsvötn is the highway.

Above the highway, at its southernmost point, is Svaðastaðir—an area known for a famous horse breed—which overlooks the road from the south. A little further away is Hofsstaðir, which is said to have been where the settler Kollsveinn rammi (“the pungent”) had his temple. There is also Hofstaðasel, which despite being a "shieling", was considered a good piece of land. It was, at one point, a center for district magistrates.
