= Gönguskarðsá =

Spring creek in Skagafjörður, Iceland

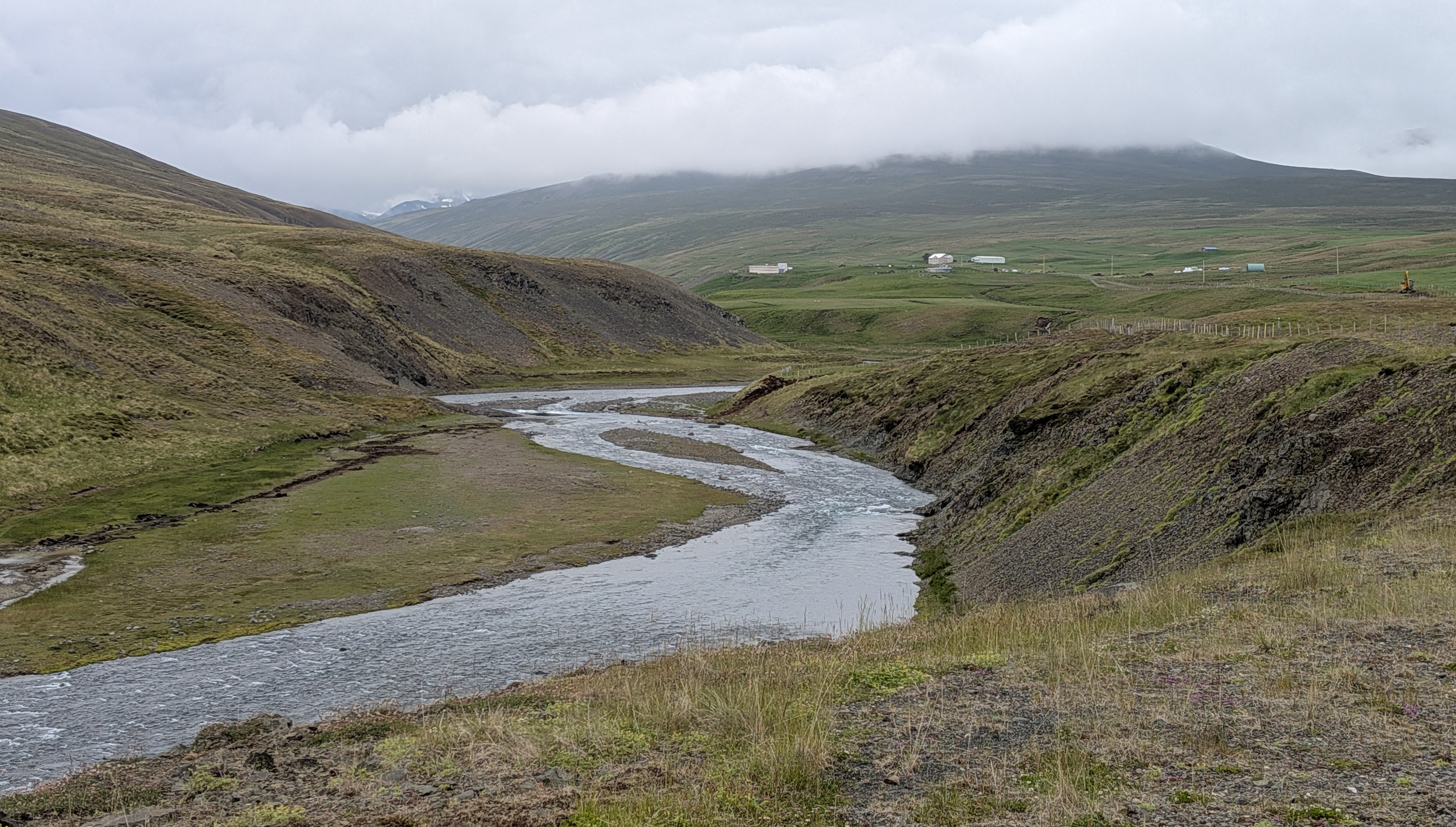

Location
- Country: Iceland
- Region: Skagafjörður

Physical characteristics
- Mouth
  - coordinates: 65°44′39.06″N 19°43′15.49″W

Basin features
- Cities: Gönguskörð

Gönguskarðsá river is a spring creek in Skagafjörður, Iceland that flows to the ocean in the Gönguskörð estuary in Sauðárkrókur (a little inlet on the shore directly north of the town) off of the north part of Sauðárkrókur. It is sometimes said to be the deadliest river in Skagafjörður County.

Gönguskarðsá originates from Gönguskörð and is a direct runoff stream that collects water from many smaller rivers that fall down from Tindastóll and Molduxi mountains, and the mountains in between. It is swift and difficult to cross in flood conditions, and has been very deadly; nearly 20 people have drowned there. One of them was Guðmundur, father of the singer Stefán Íslandi, who drowned in the spring of 1917. The river was first bridged in 1875.

The Landnámabók mentions that some settlers landed in the Gönguskörð estuary, where no one has landed in centuries. The river now has a bridge by the estuary and there was an older bridge a little farther up.

Gönguskarðsá was a source of hydroelectric power from 1947–1949, with the water leading to a small reservoir a little beyond Sauðárkrókur and to the power station in the northernmost part of the town. At the middle of the pipe is a pressure-equalizing tank (water pressure tower) made from concrete, the first in the country. In the spring of 2007, the Gönguskarðsá power station’s supply pipe caved in, taking heavy damage when mud and water flooded houses in the town.

Sources report that the river changes it its name to “Kamba” (nine kilometers away from the sea) without any other large rivers flowing into it, and from that point onward it is called Víðidalsá river again. In total, the difference between the Gönguskarðsá and Víðidalsá rivers is said to be about 27 kilometres (17 mi).
