= Selvík (Skagafjörður) =

Cove in Skagafjörður, Iceland

- Location: Skagafjörður, Iceland, on the Skagi peninsula
- Coordinates: 65°57′49.792″N 19°55′38.698″W
- Etymology: Icelandic for "seal cove"

Selvík is a cove on the eastern side of Skagi, about 35 kilometers north of Sauðárkrókur in Skagafjörður, Iceland. The area is home to the best landing on the Skagafjörður county side of the Skagi peninsula and has long been used as a port for fishing expeditions. In the abandoned settlement Selnes, on the northern side of the cove, one can clearly see ruins of fishermen's huts. There would have also been foreign traders operating out of Selvík in centuries past, as the place name Þýskaleiði ("German grave") indicates.

== History ==
Selvík became an authorized trading center on November 27, 1903. Merchants from Sauðárkrókur began to operate branches in Selvík for a while, and they ran a fish processing plant there. Now there is a marina in Selvík from which boats launch for lumpfish expeditions.

Selvík appears in sagas from the Age of the Sturlungs as the location from which Kolbeinn ungi ("the young") Arnórsson's fleet sailed from Selvík to the Westfjords on St. John’s Day in 1244 and encountered Þórður kakali Sighvatsson in the middle of Húnaflói, thus beginning the Battle of the Gulf, the only sea battle in the Icelandic sagas.

In August 1931, the seaplane Súlan, which had been involved in searching for herring, made a forced landing in Skagafjörður due to engine failure and drifted along the fjord for eight hours in rough seas. Right before the plane drifted into the cliffs near Selvík, the crew got the attention of the people there by shouting. A motorboat launched a rescue and dragged the seaplane into the cove. The day after, the crew managed to repair the engine and flew away.
