= Court of Legislature (Iceland) =

The Court of Legislature (Icelandic: Lögrétta [ˈlœɣˌrjɛhta], Old Norse: Lǫgrétta [ˈlɒɣˌreːtːa] "law-right") was a legislature and high court established in Iceland in the year 930 during the period of the Icelandic Commonwealth.

== 930 – c. 965 ==
It was an institution of Althing, the nation's legislative and judicial authority. There was no executive power in the country at the time. After the country had been divided into four quarters around 965, four courts called quarter courts were established for each of them at Althing and thus took over the judicial responsibilities of the Court of Legislature.

== c. 1262 – 1563 ==
Approximately 1015 a high court called the Fifth Court was established to hear cases left unsettled by the quarter courts. When the Commonwealth came to an end and Icelanders submitted to the authority of the Norwegian king in 1262 the Court of Legislature regained its judicial functions, as the Fifth Court and quarter courts were abolished, and retained some legislative authority. The Court of Legislature served as a high court and district courts were established as lower courts. Towards the end of the 14th century, royal succession brought both Norway and Iceland under the control of the Danish monarchy. With the introduction of absolute monarchy in Denmark-Norway, the Icelanders relinquished their autonomy to the crown, including the right to initiate and consent to legislation. After that, the Court of Legislature served almost exclusively as a court of law. In 1563 the High Court was established due to dissatisfaction with the Court of Legislature. From there on the Court of Legislature was no longer the high court of the country.

== 1563 – 1800 ==
Both the Court of Legislature and the High Court were replaced when the National High Court was established as a high court the year 1800.
