= Staðarhreppur (Skagafjörður) =

Former municipality in Skagafjörður, Iceland

Staðarhreppur Reynistaðarhreppur
- Hreppur
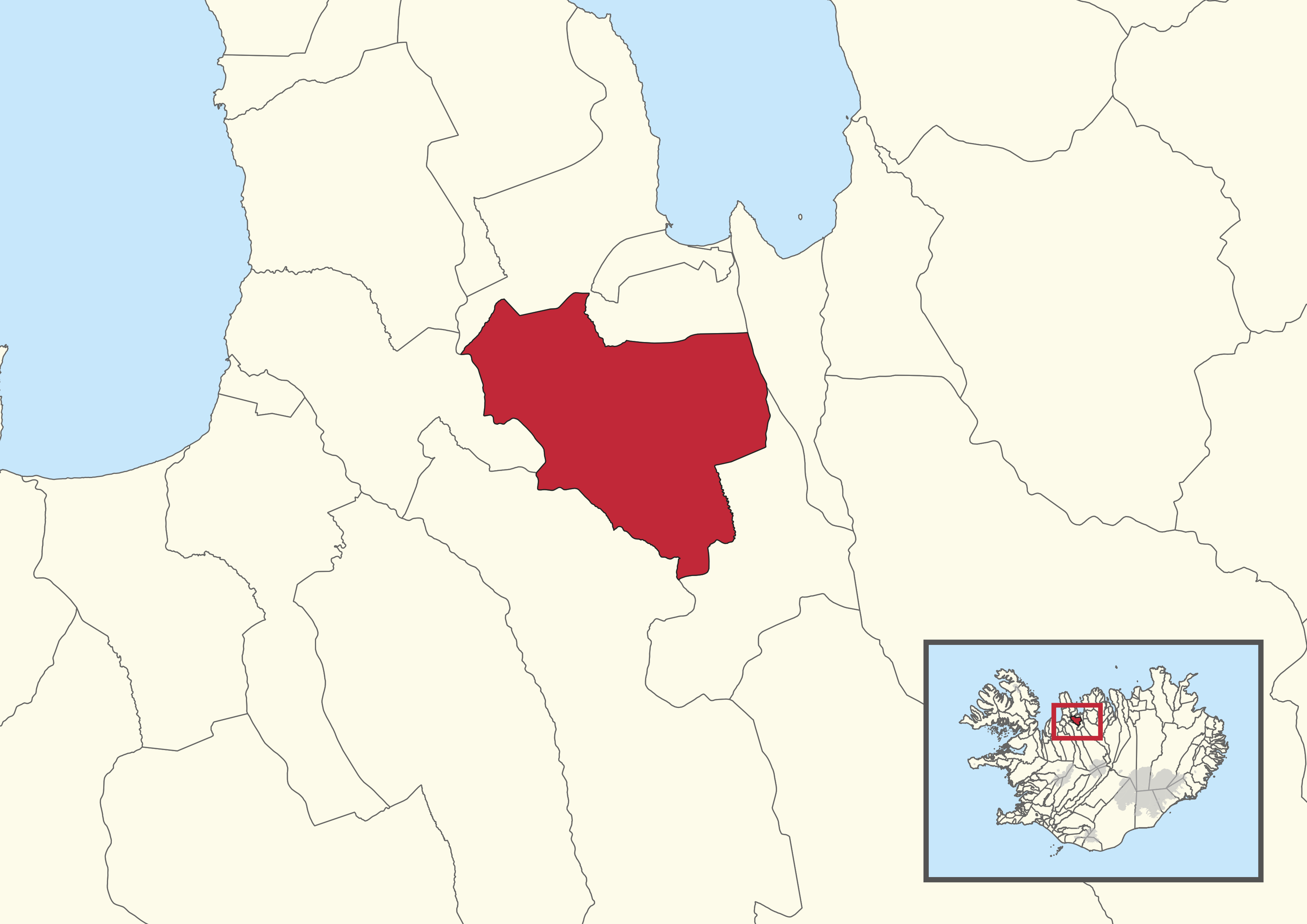
- Staðarhreppur
- Country: Iceland
- County: Skagafjörður
- Unification of Skagafjörður (municipality): June 6, 1998
- Named for: Reynistaður
- Towns: List: Hóll, Páfastaður, Dúkur, Ögmundarstaður, Glæsibær, Hafsteinsstaður, Reynisstaður, Skarðsá, Litla-Gröf, Bessastaður, Varmaland, Vík
- Time zone: UTC+0

Staðarhreppur (previously Reynistaðarhreppur) was a hreppur, an old Icelandic municipality, to the west of the Héraðsvötn in Skagafjörður, Iceland, named after the church site Reynistaður.

On June 6, 1998, Staðarhreppur joined ten other local governments to form Skagafjörður County: Skefilsstaðahreppur, Sauðárkrókur, Skarðshreppur, Seyluhreppur, Lýtingsstaðahreppur, Ríphreppur, Viðvíkurhreppur, Hólahreppur, Hofshreppur, and Fljótahreppur.

== Hreppur council ==
The last Staðarhreppur council was elected in the hreppur committee election on May 28, 1994, in which Bjarni Jónsson, Helgi Jóhann Sigurðsson, Ingibjörg Hafstað, Sigmar Jóhannsson and Sigurður Baldursson were voted into office.

=== Council chairs ===
- 1874–1880 Jón Jónsson in Hóll
- 1880–1882 Stefán Jónasson in Páfastaður
- 1882–1883 Björn Þorbergsson in Dúkur
- 1883–1887 Jón Björnsson in Ögmundarstaður
- 1887–1892 Árni Jónsson læknir in Glæsibær
- 1892–1896 Jón Jónsson in Hafsteinsstaður
- 1896–1899 Sigurjón Bergvinsson in Glæsibær
- 1899–1901 Sigurður Jónsson in Reynisstaður
- 1901–1904 Gísli Konráðsson in Skarðsá
- 1904–1916 Albert Kristjánsson in Páfastaður
- 1916–1919 Sveinn Jónsson in Hóll
- 1919–1922 Jón Sigurðsson in Reynisstaður
- 1922–1966 Arngrímur Sigurðsson in Litla-Gröf
- 1966–1982 Sæmundur Jónsson in Bessastaður
- 1982–1994 Þorsteinn Ásgrímsson in Varmaland
- 1994–1998 Ingibjörg Hafstað in Vík
