= Borgarsandur =

Beach in Skagafjörður, Iceland

Coordinates: 65°44′36.046″N 19°35′0.964″W

- Beach
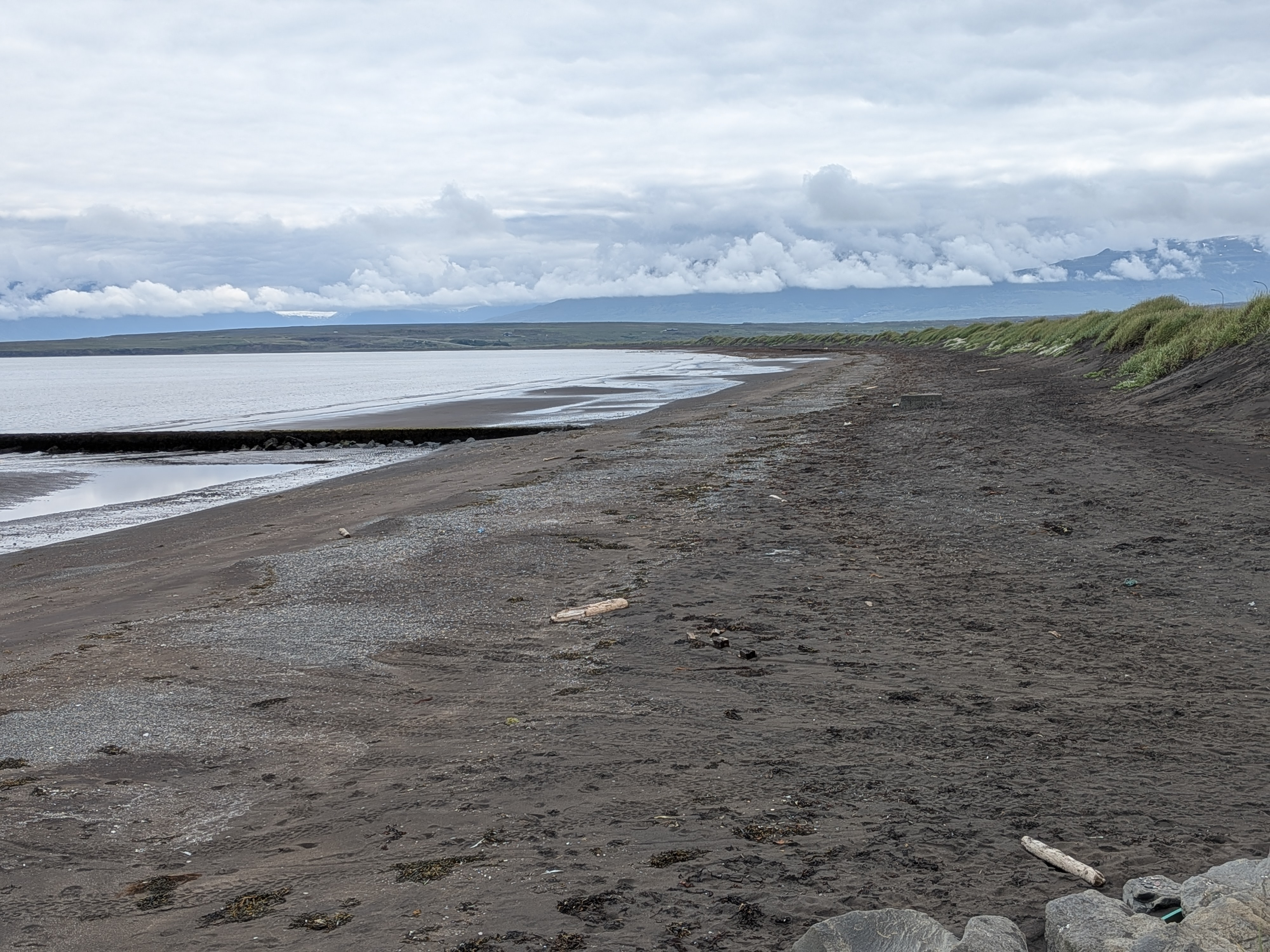
- Interactive map of Borgarsandur
- Location: Skagafjörður, Iceland
- Water bodies: Héraðsvötn
- Etymology: Town of Sjávarborg

Dimensions
  - Length: 4 km (2.5 mi)

Borgarsandur is a flat and fairly expansive beach, now largely overgrown, at the western head of Skagafjörður, Iceland, spanning from Sauðárkrókur to the western mouth of the Héraðsvötn. The black sand beach is just under four kilometers long. There are hiking and camping areas there, and people often enjoy renting a horse and taking it out for a run.

Borgarsandur is named after the town Sjávarborg. Borgarsandur is mentioned in the Landnámabók, which mentions the time Kráku-Hreiðar Ófeigsson “came to Skagafjörður and sailed onto Borgarsandur, causing a shipwreck.”
