= Sauðárhreppur =

Former municipality in Skagafjörður, Iceland

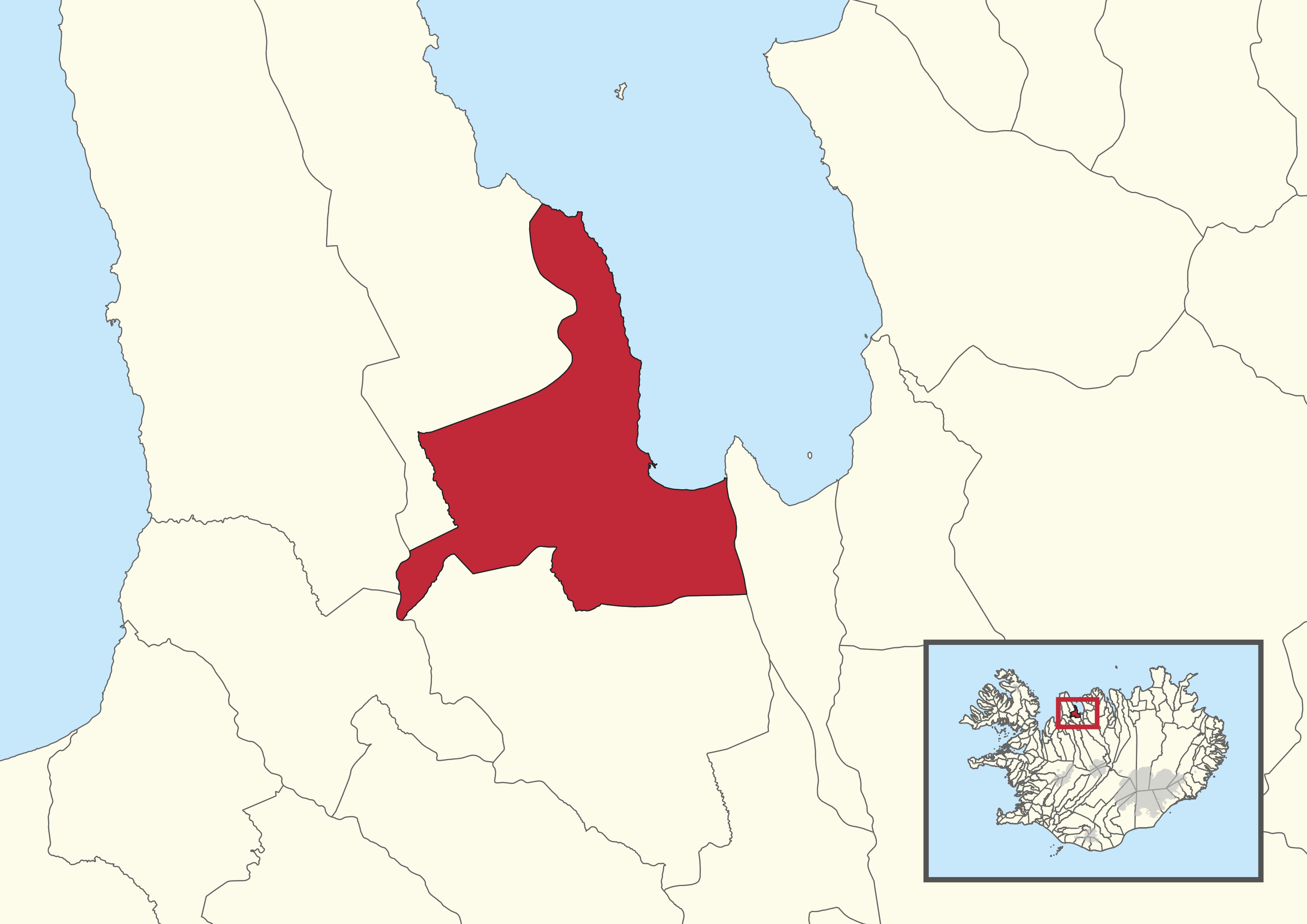
- Sauðárhreppur
- Country: Iceland
- Country: Skagafjörður
- Unification of Skagafjörður (municipality): June 6, 1998
- Named after: Sauðá
- Time zone: UTC+0
- Became a part of Skagafjörður (municipality) in 1998

Sauðárhreppur was a hreppur, an old Icelandic municipality, in the west of Skagafjörður County, Iceland. It is named after the town of Sauðá.

The hreppur was divided in two in 1907, becoming Sauðárkrókshreppur and Skarðshreppur. These hreppurs both became part of Skagafjörður County in 1998.
