= Skagi =

Peninsula in northern Iceland

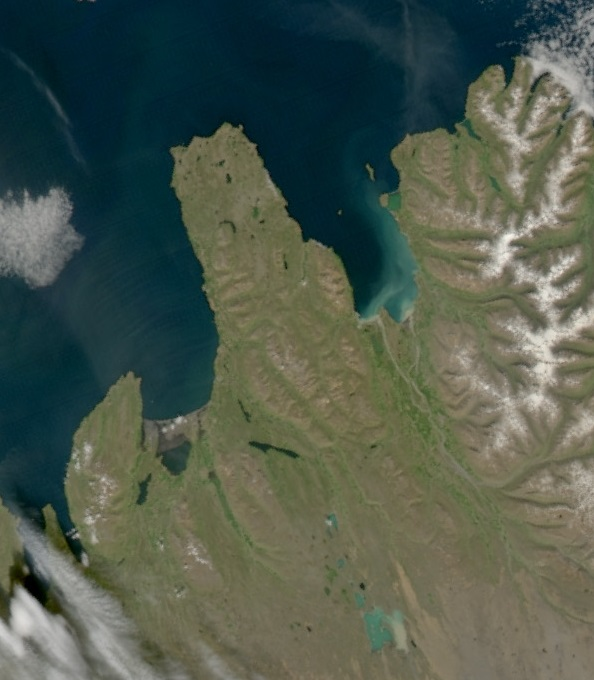
- Satellite image of Skagi

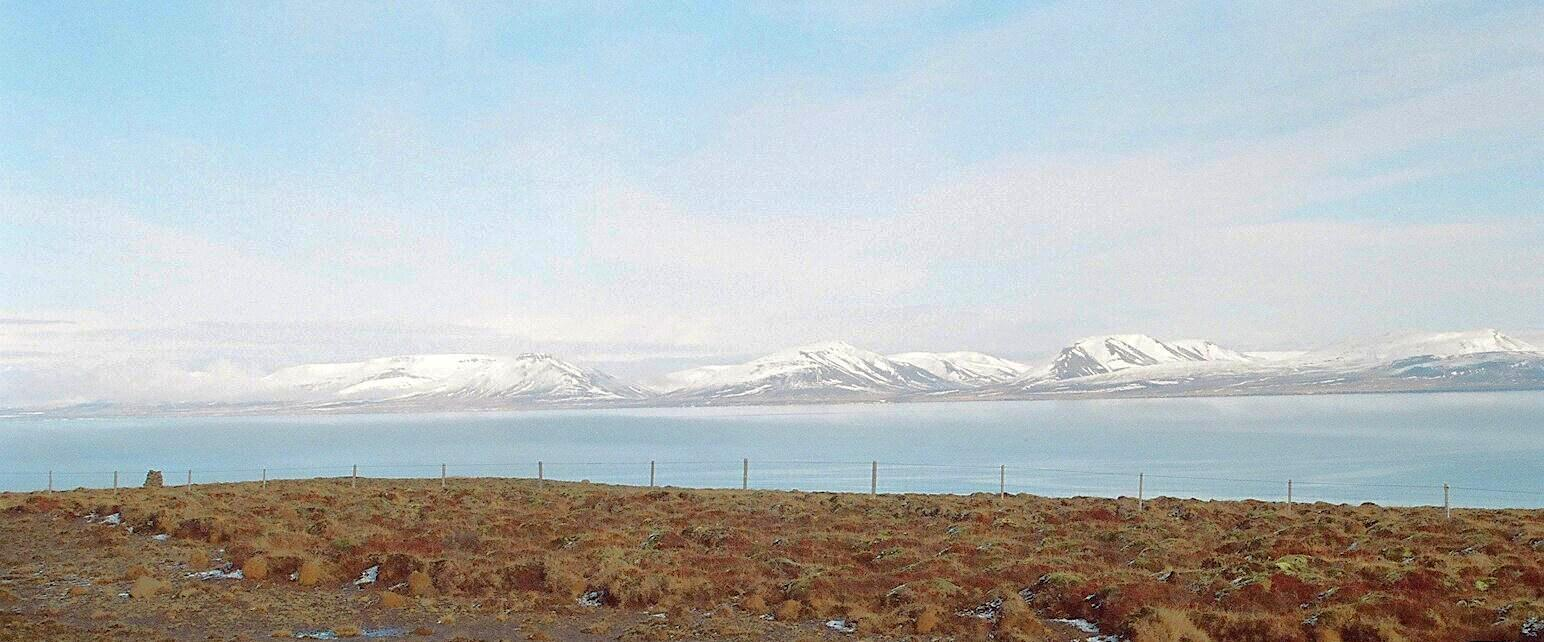
- The view over Skagi from Vatnsnes
- Etymology: "Skagi" is an Icelandic word for "peninsula"

Geography
- Location: Skagafjörður
- Coordinates: 65°59′16″N 20°10′53″W

Administration
- Iceland
- County: Skagafjörður (municipality) and Austur-Húnavatnssýsla

Skagi is the name of the peninsula between Húnaflói and Skagafjörður, which derives its name from Skagi.

There used to be three municipalities in Skagi; two were Skagahreppur and Vindhælishreppur, now named Húnabyggð and Skagaströnd, on the western side, which belonged to Austur-Húnavatnssýsla County. The third municipality, on the eastern side, was Skefilsstaðahreppur, which became a part of what is now Skagafjörður County in 1998.

Reykjaströnd near Skagafjörður, east of Tindastóll Mountain, is not considered part of Skagi. The settlement on the Húnaflói side in Skagi (the west), beginning at the church site Höskuldsstaðir—and out past Kálfshamarsvík cove—is called Skagaströnd district. On the Skagafjörður side (the east), Skagi is considered to comprise the area from Sævarlandsvík cove along Tindastóll and out to Skagatá (the tip of the peninsula). The outermost farms on the Húnavatnssýsla side are also said to be in Skagi, but not Skagaströnd. The county border runs the length of Skagi, a bit east of center.

The edge of Skagi is low-lying near the Skagaheiði plateau, where there are a number of lakes with great trout fishing. Mountains begin farther south, particularly to the southwest. The most well-known of these mountains is Spákonufell, overlooking Höfðakaupstaður (now generally known as Skagaströnd), which is the only urban area in Skagi. There used to be a small village by Kálfshamarsvík cove near the outer edge of Skagi, but no urbanization took place on the eastern side of Skagi, although there used to be fishing access from Selvík. Throughout Skagi, especially farther out, there were many extra resources to take advantage of, like seal and eider duck hunting, as well as trout fishing in Skagaheiði's lakes.

On the Skagafjörður side of the peninsula, Hraun is the outermost farm. There is a lighthouse there in Skagatá. On June 16, 2008, a polar bear came onto the land near Hraun. Another polar bear was put down on July 3, 2008 in Þverárfjall, a short way from the highway between Sauðárkrókur and Skagaströnd. Þverárfjall is in the southernmost of Skagi, and about 35 kilometers from Hraun.
