= Mælifell (Skagafjörður) =

Farm and church site in Skagafjörður, Iceland

- Farm and church site
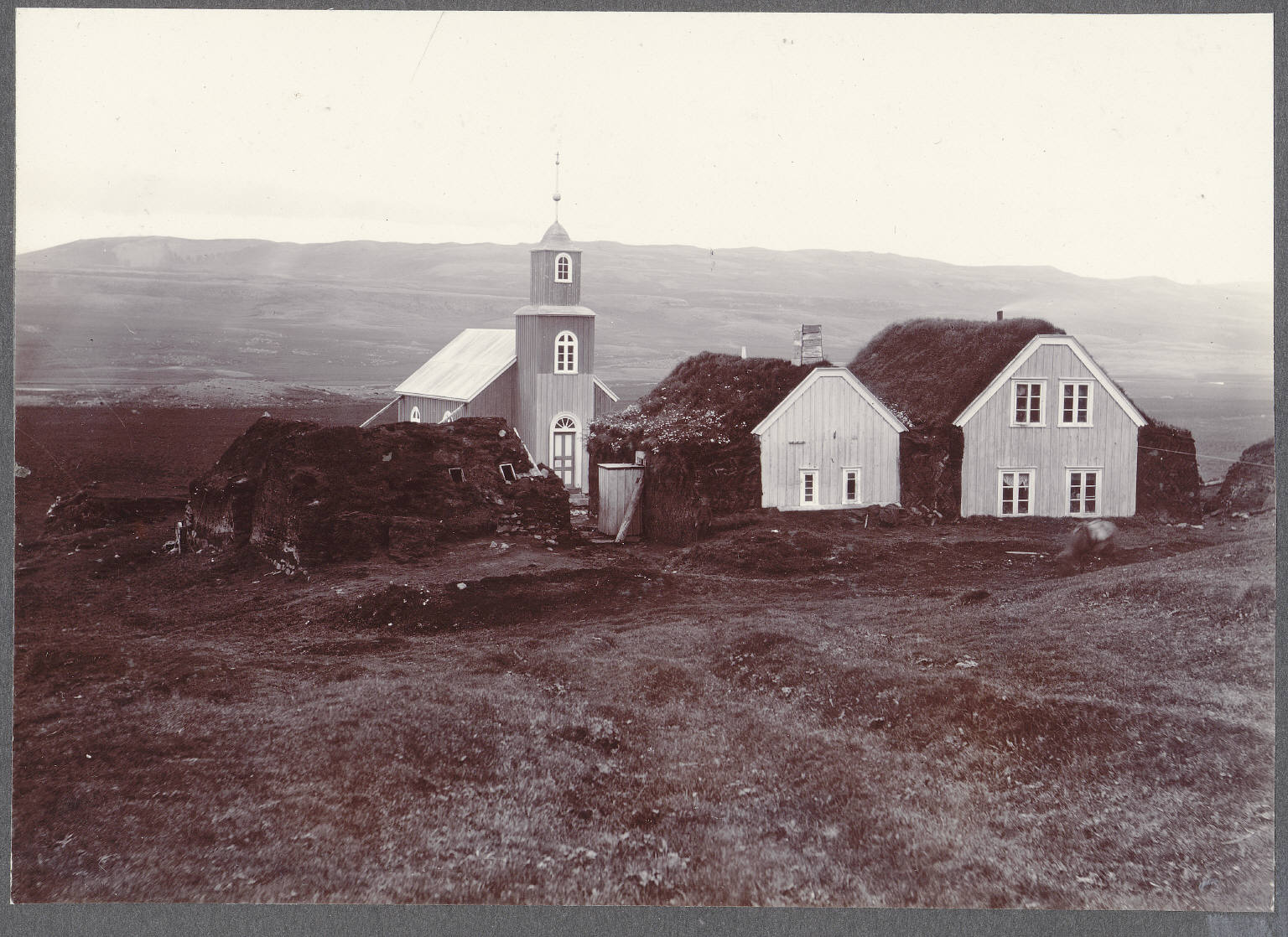
- Mælifell around 1900
- Interactive map of Mælifell
- Country: Iceland
- County: Skagafjörður

Mælifell is a farm, church site, and former vicarage in interior, western Skagafjörður, Iceland. The farm is at the foot of Mælifellshnjúkur, one of the best-known and most prominent of Skagafjörður’s mountains. West of the mountain is Mælifellsdalur valley, through which there used to be a well-traveled road between northern and southern Iceland onto the Kjalvegur road and Stórisandur.

One of the most well-known priests who served in Mælifell parish was Arngrímur lærði (“the learned”) Jónsson. There is now a little stone church in Mælifell that was consecrated in 1925.
