= High Court (Iceland) =

- Yfirréttur
- Established: 27 March 1563
- Dissolved: 1800
- Jurisdiction: Iceland
- Location: Þingvellir
- Appeals to: Monarch (1563–1732); Supreme Court of Denmark (1732–1800)
- Number of positions: 24

The High Court (Icelandic: Yfirréttur [ˈɪːvɪrˌrjɛhtʏr̥]) was a high court in Iceland established in 27 March 1563. The court was established due to dissatisfaction with the Court of Legislature which had been the high court of the country from c. 1262. In 1800 the National High Court was established replacing the High Court.
