= Sigurlaugur Elíasson =

Icelandic artist and poet

Sigurlaugur Elíasson (born May 26, 1957, in Borgarjarðarhreppur) is an Icelandic artist and poet. He studied at the Icelandic School of Art and Craft (now the Iceland Academy of the Arts). His first solo exhibition was at the National Gallery ASI 1985. He has held ten solo exhibitions of paintings and graphics. Sigurlaugur also published his first book of poetry Grátónaregnbogann in 1985. He is the brother of Gyrðir Elíasson and lives and works in Sauðárkrókur.
