= Gönguskörð =

Settlement and valley on the west side of Skagafjörður, Iceland

- Coordinates: 65°45′9.641″N 19°46′36.685″W
- Country: Iceland
- Country: Skagafjörður
- Boroughs: Areas in Gönguskörð: Víðidalur, Kálfárdalur

Gönguskörð is a settlement and valley on the west side of Skagafjörður, Iceland, due northwest of Sauðárkrókur, in between Molduxi mountain to the south and Tindastóll Mountain to the north. Shortly after entering Gönguskörð, the area is split into three wings. The southernmost is Víðidalur in Staðarfjöll, the middle wing towards the south west is called Kálfárdalur, and the third and widest wing leads to the north along Tindastóll. The Gönguskarðsá river runs through the mountain pass and collects in many smaller rivers.

There are still some farms in Gönguskörð, but most of them have been abandoned. On the northern side of the mouth of the valley, at the base of Tindastóll, is the Skarð farm, which probably used to be named Gönguskarð. Skarðshreppur was named after the farm.

There is a ski resort in Tindastóll and there are many popular hiking trails in the area.
