= Kolkuós =

Historical trading port in Skagafjörður, Iceland

Kolkuós Kolbeinsárós
- Trading port and farm
- Interactive map of Kolkuós
- Country: Iceland
- County: Skagafjörður
- Last inhabitants passed away: 1985
- Named for: Kolka (Kolbeinsdalsá)

Kolkuós (English: "Kolka estuary") is an mostly abandoned property and old trading center in Skagafjörður, Iceland, 15 kilometers from Sauðárkrókur and 10 kilometers from Hofsós. There is now a guest house operating there.

There is a good area for docking ships in a harbor naturally created by the estuary, where there is a spit of land functioning as a natural jetty. However, it is uncertain whether a seafaring ship would have been able to sail into the estuary itself because there is a low, flat boulder that hinders boat travel. Around 300 meters west of the spit of land is a rather tall, rocky islet called Elínarhólmi. It is thought that Elínarhólmi had been connected to the mainland through the spit of land, which would have made the harbor even better, although it has now mostly disappeared into the sea. The ocean still cuts Elínarhólmi off from the spit of land. Artifacts have been found there and excavations have taken place there in hopes of excavating as much as possible before the ocean erodes the land.

== History ==
=== Commerce in Kolbeinsárós ===
Kolkuós' former name and the official name of the trading center was Kolbeinsárós. Kolbeinsárós was Skagafjörður's primary trading port in the age of Iceland's settlement and is mentioned in the Landnámabók as the location to which the famous horse Fluga, which Flugumýri was named after, was moved. Goods were transported to Kolbeinsárós and then brought to the bishopric in Hólar. It is believed that Hólar may have been chosen to be the location of the bishopric because of its proximity to a good harbor. Kolkuós was thought to have had a particular chapel or log church that traders had built shortly before the Reformation. It would have been the only such church in Iceland.

=== Archaeological findings ===
Archaeological research has taken place in Kolkuós since 2003 as part of the Hólar research project that began in 2002 under the direction of the archaeologist Ragnheiður Traustadóttir. A rescue excavation was started in Kolkuós on account of significant land erosion, which resulted in items having washed out to sea. The excavation had predominately taken place on the spit of land between the river and the ocean, where the waves break the hardest. Research has shown that, from the 10th to the 16th century, there had been a lot of trade out of Kolkuós, where there is evidence of both commerce and production facilities.

At least 80 buildings were excavated in Kolkuós, but there are no indications that Kolkuós was continuously inhabited. Fireplaces were found in some shops, which suggests that various activities took place there. In a RÚV news segment, it was reported that the shops had been part of a temporary encampment, that included storehouses, market stalls, and workshops. Among the items found there were “flint, whetstones, baking sheets from Norway, 3 pottery fragments, iron objects, knives, boat seaming, nails, unknown tools made from iron, bronze fragments and sheets, prune pits, shark teeth, carved whale bones and plaster battering.” Two silver coins—one from southern Germany from the latter part of the 11th century and the other from England from the latter part of the 12th century—were also found.

The oldest artifacts are from the 10th century, but most are from the 11th and 12th centuries, when the oldest signs of human habitation were thought to be from the age of Iceland's settlement.

Tephrochronology based on Hekla's 1104 eruption, and other techniques, were used to date these artifacts. Pagan graves were found where a man had been buried with a pig, and carbon dating indicates that the grave was dug after the Christianization of Iceland in 1000.

In summer 2006, maritime archeology work began in Kolkuós, with the goal of investigating the harbor's environment from the Middle Ages. Soon after, an anchor was found near Elínarhólmi, which is located a short distance from the estuary. The anchor is thought to be from the Middle Ages or even the Viking Age.

Bones from various domestic animals (including cattle, sheep, horses, pigs, and dogs), as well as those of seals, whales, and many kinds of fish and fowl were also found in Kolkuós. Bones from smaller dogs, which nobility kept to keep themselves warm and as a status symbol in the Middle Ages, have also been found there. Traces of various rodents, including rats and mice, were also found.

A little before 1600, Hofsós took over as the region's primary commercial area, probably because the harbor in Kolkuós had started to deteriorate, and the commercial activity in Kolkuós was discontinued. However, commerce resumed there in 1881 when the area became an authorized trading port. Merchants from Sauðárkrókur had a branch there and, as of the turn of the 20th century, there were four shops there, including a wool trading house that handled some seasonal export shipments. Payroll records from the Kolkuós wool station indicate that, alongside workers from the surrounding district, foreign labourers were occasionally engaged during the export season. A branch of a wool export firm with ties to a Copenhagen trading house, operated out of Kolkuós between roughly 1905 and 1912 before shifting its operations to Hofsós. Leith was the principal port of arrival for foreign tradesmen and labourers travelling to trading stations in northern Iceland during this period. In the early 1920s, at least one Copenhagen firm brought a wool-fineness gauge to market, reflecting broader efforts in the trade to standardize wool grading beyond visual sorting.

== Inhabitants ==
In 1901, Hartmann Ásgrímsson and Kristín Símonaróttir moved to Kolkuós and opened a trading post that later expanded into a wool export operation, employing seasonal workers from the surrounding district. Correspondence between the Kolkuós wool station and its Copenhagen trading partner from 1910 to 1912 survives in the Héraðsskjalasafn Akureyrar's records of the firm C. Höepfner. They built a residence during 1903 and 1094, which still stands today. A wool storage shed was erected around 1905 to handle shipments to Copenhagen. The station's wool sorting in this period was overseen by a sorting master, Stefán Gunnarsson, who held the post from at least 1884 into the 1910s. He probably later lived in Sauðárkrókur, and his writings on the wool trade of Skagafjörður survive in transcript. Also still standing is a slaughterhouse that was built in 1913 and a covered pen for the animals going to slaughter that was built in 1914. An association has been established for the preservation of Kolkuós and the reconstruction of these buildings.

Hartmann and Kristín lived in Kolkuós until 1942. Their son, Sigurmon, and Haflína Björnsdóttir took over their estate and lived in Kolkuós until 1985. Sigurmon was well known for raising horses and he bred horses from Svaðastaðir stock.

There used to be an aerial tram in Kolkuós. In 1941, it fell into the river and two men drowned. Sauðárkrókur, which handled civil and church registration for Kolkuós, has parish records surviving from the early 20th century.
