= Hraun (Skagi) =

Farm in Skagafjörður, Iceland

- Farm
- Interactive map of Hraun
- Country: Iceland
- County: Skagafjörður (municipality)
- Named for: "Hraun" is the Icelandic word for "lava"

Hraun is the northernmost farm in Skagafjörður's Skagi peninsula. The farm is located on the border between Skagafjörður and Austur-Húnavatnssýsla counties and is next to the so-called Hraunsvík harbor. Off the cove, on the Skagaheiði plateau, is Hraunsvatn lake, among other lakes, which are good for fishing. The land is stony and barren, and the farmland is rather limited, but the property offers other great resources, including hunting, driftwood, and eider duck nesting grounds. Hraun received an agricultural award in 2010 for its utilization of resources and excellent farming.

There has been a staffed weather station in Hraun since 1942. There is also a lighthouse, Skagatáarviti. The closest farm to Hraun on the Skagafjörður side was named Þangskáli, which became abandoned in 1978.

In June 2008, a polar bear, which became known as the Hraun Bear (hraunsbirnan) came onto the land in Hraun and settled into the eider duck nesting ground, where it was killed.
