= Mælifellshnjúkur =

Mountain in Skagafjörður, Iceland

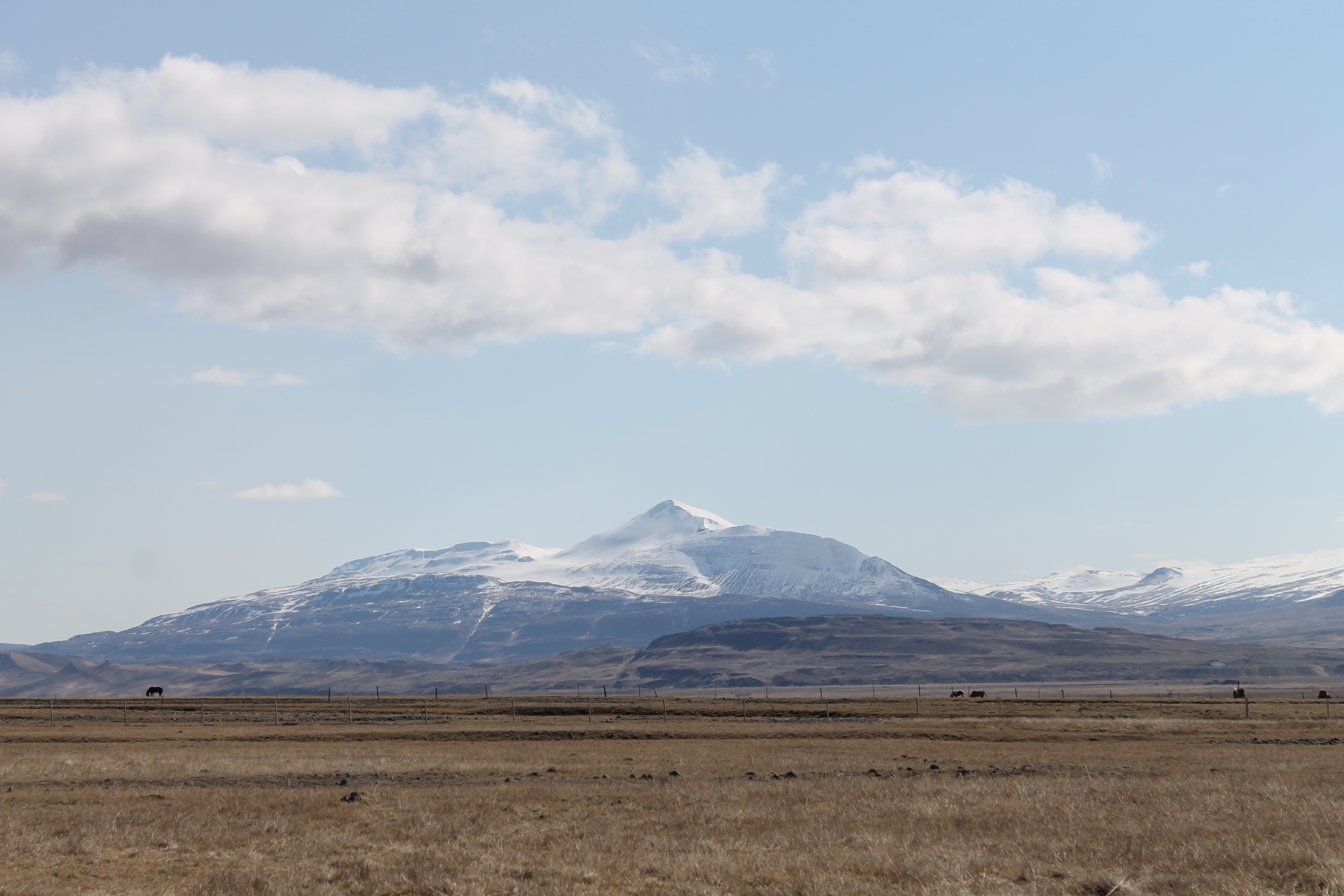
- Mælifellshnjúkur

Highest point
- Elevation: 1,138 m (3,734 ft)
- Coordinates: 65°24′0.05″N 19°21′58.00″W

Naming
- English translation: Measurement Peak
- Language of name: Icelandic

Geography
- Country: Iceland
- Region: Skagafjörður
- Settlement: Mælifell

Mælifellshnjúkur is a mountain on the inner western side of Skagafjörður, Iceland. It is 1,138 meters (3,733 feet) tall, It is one of the most prominent and best-known of Skagafjörður's mountains, towering over those nearby. The peak is allegedly visible from ten counties. It also offers a good view, and is a popular spot for hiking, given that the climb is relatively easy.

== History ==
The peak is mentioned in the Landnámabók, which states that Kráku-Hreiðar Ófeigsson, settler in Tungusveit, chose to die in Mælifell, a church site and former vicarage that Mælifellshnjúkur overlooks.

The name Mælifellshnjúkur ("measurement peak") refers to the fact that, since early in Iceland's settlement, people in the surrounding counties considered noon to be when the sun was above the mountain. The peak has also been used to forecast the weather; if there is a fog belt is around the middle of the mountain but the tip of the peak clearly protrudes through the fog, the weather the day after will be dry. On the eastern side of the mountain, there is a snow, which is thought to resemble a horse seen from the side, into the summer. As the snow melts, and the "horse" disappears above the shoulders, it becomes possible to drive to Stórisandur, in Iceland's highlands. The old southern road to Stórisandur and Kjalvegur runs through Mælifellsdalur valley, to the west of the mountain.

Jakob H. Líndal researched the geology of Mælifellshnjúkur and wrote an article about it in the Icelandic magazine Náttúrufræðingurinn (The Natural Scientist), published in volume 10, 1940. Various people have researched the mountain since then. Mælifellshnjúkur is made of palagonite, which is located among much older basalt lava beds. It was formed from eruptions under thick Ice Age ice during a short-lived period of volcanic eruption activity that took place in Skagafjörður long after the region's primary seismic profile accumulated and the main features of the landscape had formed. Drangey, Málmey, Þórðarhöfði, and Skagi's most remote geological formations formed during the same period. Mælifellshnjúkur is around one million years old.
