= Reykjaströnd =

District on the west side of Skagafjörður, Iceland

- District
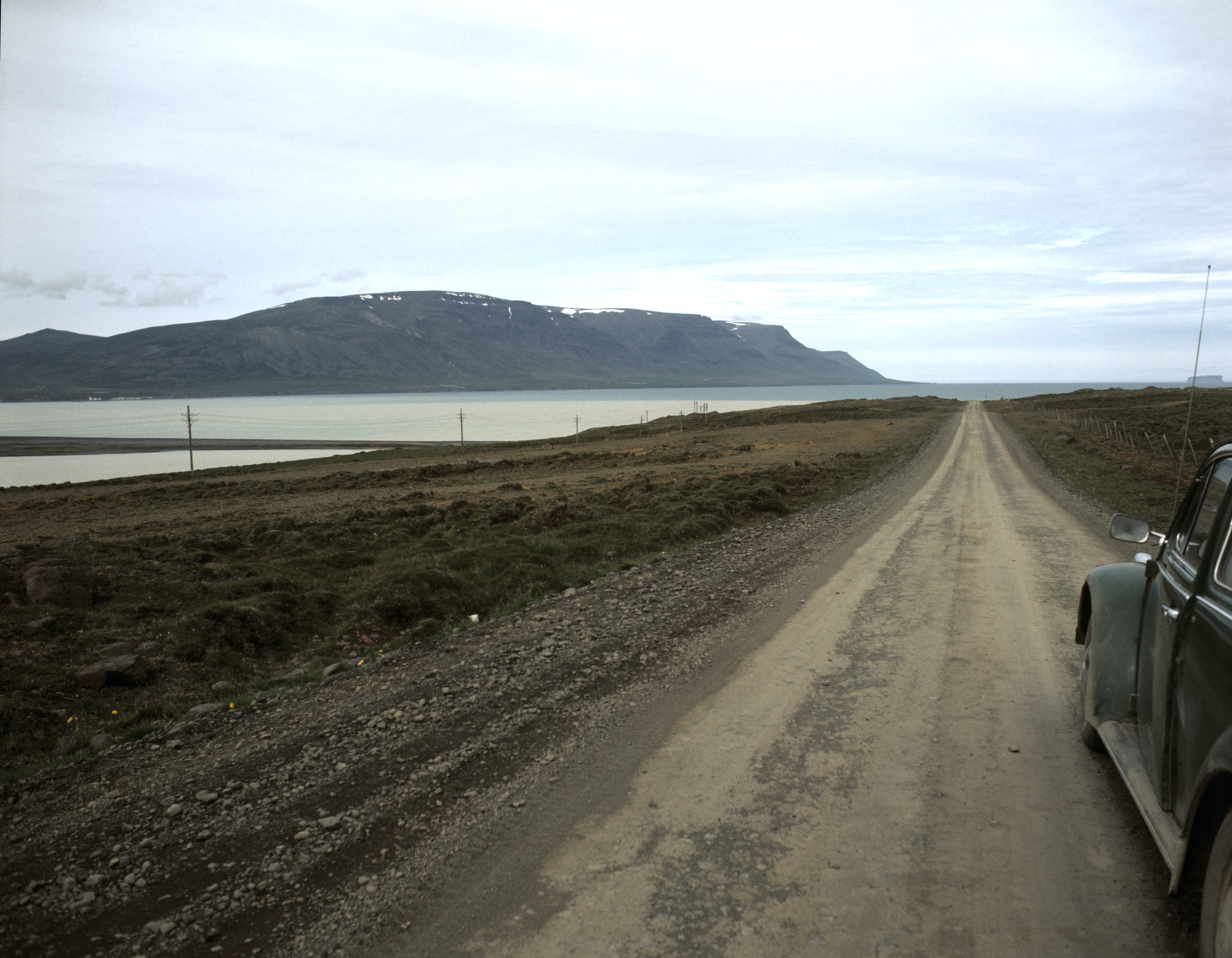
- View looking towards Reykjaströnd and Tindastóll
- Interactive map of Reykjaströnd
- Coordinates: 65.8799°N 19.7389°W
- Country: Iceland
- County: Skagafjörður (municipality)
- Boroughs: Farms: Fagranes, Reykir

Reykjaströnd ("Reykir Beach") is a district on the west side of Skagafjörður, Iceland, at the base of Tindastóll mountain. Rekjaströnd begins along the Gönguskarðsá river and continues north for the length of Tindastóll, until it reaches so-called "Landsend."

== Geography ==
The lowland is not wide, but is extensively covered in vegetation. There are quite a few farms, the most famous of which is Fagranes, which was for many years a church site and rectory, and the outermost farm Reykir, for which the beach is named. The hot spring Grettislaug is also in Reykjaströnd. There is a small harbor in Reykir from which people used to fish and sail to Drangey. The people of Reykjaströnd previously received extensive advantages from Drangey including extra access to driftwood.

It used to be possible to get to Reykjaströnd by going north over Tindastóll to Sævarland in Laxárdalur valley during neap tide around Fjörvegur, as it was then called, but it is now impassible. It also might have been possible to go around Tæpagata road up the mountain, but now it is, however, difficult and dangerous to traverse. South of the area is Gönguskarðsá, which was often impassible and considered the most dangerous river in the county.
