= Reykir =

District in Skagafjörður, Iceland

- Farm (abandoned)
- Interactive map of Reykir
- Country: Iceland
- County: Skagafjörður (municipality)
- District: Reykjaströnd

Reykir is the outermost abandoned farm in the Reykjaströnd district of Skagafjörður, Iceland. A narrow peninsula, called Reykjadiskur, extends northward from the farm. The location is also home to a warm spring mentioned in the sagas that is now a tourist destination and Glerhallavík cove, an area rich in chalcedony.

According to Grettis saga, there was a church at Reykir, but no other source mentions it.

== Grettislaug ==
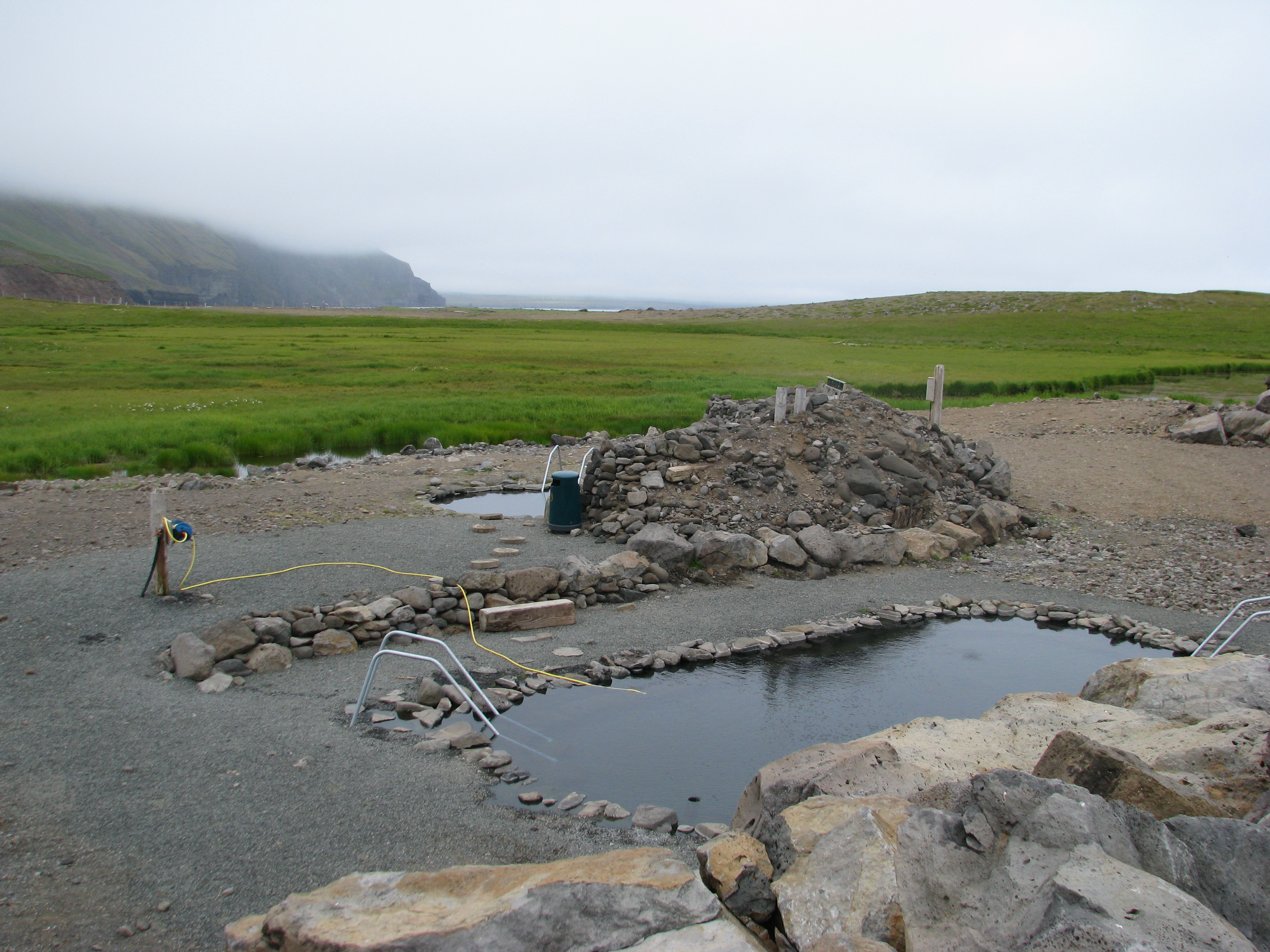
Grettislaug

Reykir is also a source of geothermal power, as the Icelandic name suggests (the word reykir also used to refer to "fumes"). According to the sagas, Grettir sterki ("the strong") Ásmundarson went to a warm spring there just above the tide line where he warmed himself after swimming from Drangey island (a feat referred to as Drangeyjarsund or Grettissund, "Drangey swim" or "Grettir’s swim", respectively). Grettir was said to "warm himself in there for a long time at night, because he became cold after such a swim."

Until the 20th century, there were two springs. One, called Reykjalaug, was lined with stones and used for laundry. The second, smaller pool was named Grettislaug. In fall 1934, Skagafjörður was beset by a terrible storm and both the warm springs were destroyed by the waves because the sandbar separating them from the sea had moved further up. The hot water then escaped the spring flowed into the ocean. In 1992, the pool was rebuilt at the behest of the farmer Jón Eiríksson Drangeyjarjarl ("Earl of Drangey"). The pool was lined with stones and a breakwater was built around it. Since then, it has been called Grettislaug. The spring is around 4.5 by 3.75 meters and about 80 centimeters deep. The water is around 42 degrees Celsius (113 Fahrenheit). It has since become a popular tourist destination. There is a small harbor right next to the spring and people sail from there to Drangey.

== Glerhallavík ==
On the coast of Reykir is Glerhallavík, located at the foot of Tindastóll mountain's steep cliffs. It was previously an area with a lot of chalcedony—white quartz stones. Quartz amygdules have loosened from the rock and been polished by the coastal waves and they are visible during low tide. Now, the stones have mostly disappeared because people have collected them, despite this being prohibited.

In nearby Sandfell, there used to be an Iceland spar mine.
