= Quarter courts of Iceland =

Former lower courts in Iceland (965-1262)

Quarter courts
- Fjórðungsdómar
- Established: c. 965
- Dissolved: c. 1262
- Jurisdiction: Iceland
- Location: Þingvellir
- Appeals to: Fifth Court
- Appeals from: Spring assembly courts
- Number of positions: 144 (36 per court)

The quarter courts (Icelandic: fjórðungsdómur (singular), fjórðungsdómar (plural)) were lower courts established in Iceland approximately in the year 965 during the period of the Icelandic Commonwealth. They were institutions of Althing, the nation's legislative and judicial authority. There was no executive power in the country at the time. The country was divided into quarters and each quarter had a court consisting of 36 judges.
