= Molduxi =

Mountain in northern Iceland

- Location within Iceland

Highest point
- Elevation: 706 m (2,316 ft)
- Coordinates: 65°43′03″N 19°43′06″W

Naming
- Language of name: Icelandic

Geography
- Location: Skagafjörður, Iceland

Molduxi is a mountain overlooking Sauðárkrókur and Borgarsveit in Skagafjörður, Iceland. The mountain is 706 metres (2,316 ft) and easy to climb. There is a panoramic view of Skagafjörður from the top of Molduxi, and there is a popular hiking trail that leads up the mountain from Sauðárkrókur.
