= Fifth Court =

- Fimmtardómur
- Established: c. 1015
- Dissolved: c. 1262
- Jurisdiction: Iceland
- Location: Þingvellir
- Appeals from: Quarter courts
- Number of positions: 48

The Fifth Court (Icelandic: Fimmtardómur, c.1015 – c.1262) was a supreme court established in Iceland approximately in the year 1015 during the period of the Icelandic Commonwealth. It was an institution of Althing, the nation's legislative and judicial authority. There was no executive power in the country at the time.

The jurisdiction of the court was the entire country, as opposed the contemporary quarter courts, whose jurisdiction extended only their relevant quarter of the country. The goal in establishing the court was probably unifying the judging of court cases throughout the whole country. The Fifth Court accepted appeals in cases already judged in one of the quarter court. The Fifth Court consisted of 48 men. 36 of them judged in cases, while both plaintiff and defender could bump up to 6 judges. Verdicts were decided by majority votes. This arrangement lasted throughout the period of the Icelandic Commonwealth.
