= National High Court =

Icelandic high court

- Landsyfirréttur
- Established: 1800
- Dissolved: 1919
- Jurisdiction: Iceland
- Location: Reykjavík
- Appeals to: Supreme Court of Denmark

The National High Court (Icelandic: Landsyfirréttur í Reykjavík [ˈlan(t)sˌɪːvɪrˌrjɛhtʏr i ˈreiːcaˌviːk], Danish: Landsoverretten i Reykjavik) was a high court in Iceland established in 1800. The court was established due to dissatisfaction with the High Court which had been the high court of the country from 1563. In 1919, the Supreme Court of Iceland was established replacing the National High Court.
