= Drangey =

Island of northern Iceland

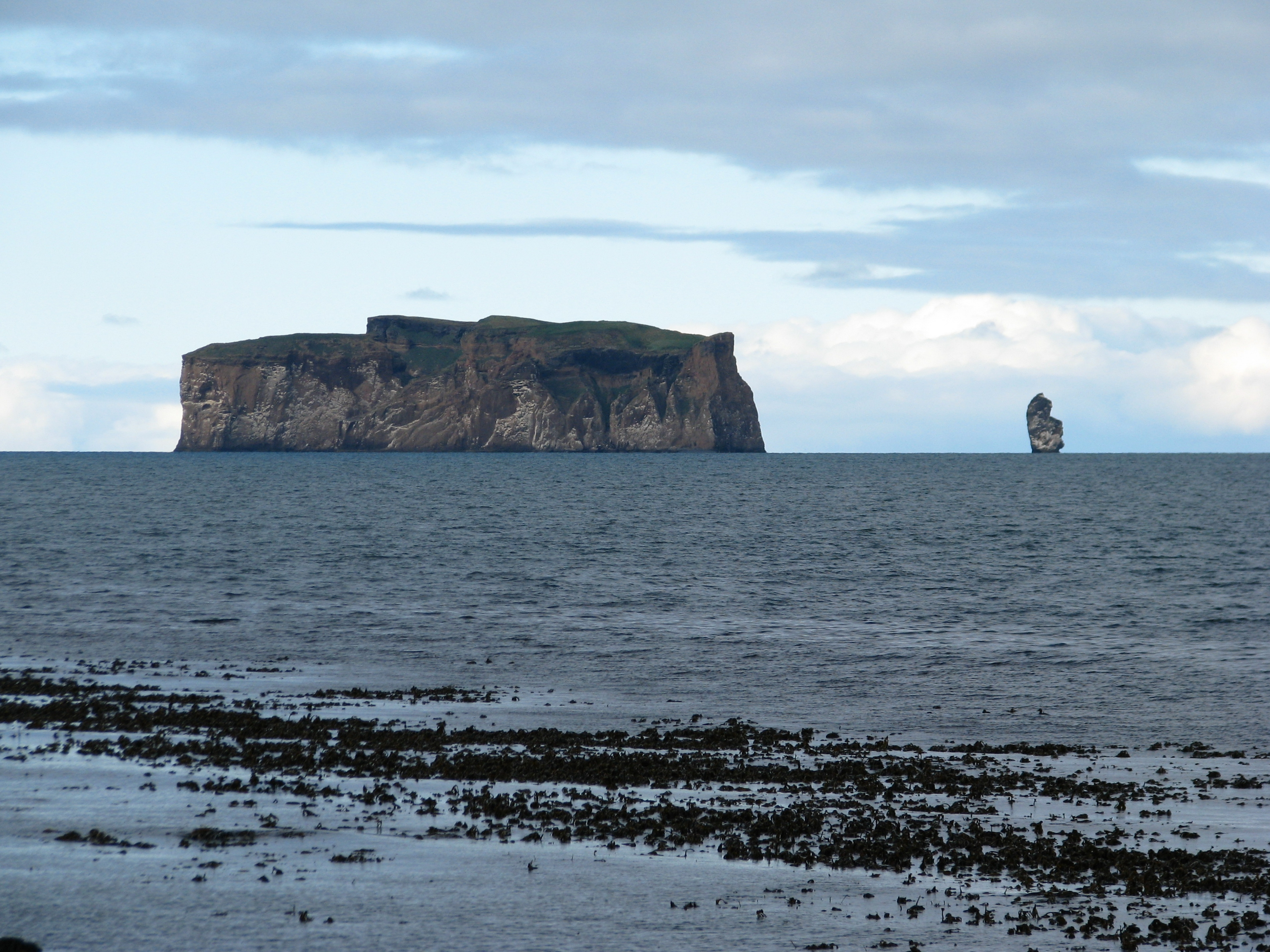

- Location of Drangey in Iceland

Geography
- Location: Skagafjörður
- Coordinates: 65°56′48″N 19°41′18″W
- Highest elevation: 180 m (590 ft)

Administration
- Iceland

Drangey (Icelandic pronunciation: [ˈtrauŋkˌeiː]) or Drang Isle is an uninhabited island in the Skagafjörður fjord in northern Iceland. It is the remnant of a 700,000‑year‑old volcano, mostly made of volcanic palagonite tuff, forming a massive rock fortress.

The island was first mentioned in the Icelandic classic Grettis saga as being the refuge of the outlaw Grettir, who spent his last years there with his brother Illugi and his slave Glaumur. He fled there with his two companions when enemies were seeking his life because of the island's high, impervious cliffs. It is described as having a flock of 80 sheep, and many birds nesting on the cliffs. In late autumn of 1031, Grettir was assassinated where he lay dying in his shed on the island. Þorbjörn Öngull and his men were the perpetrators.

An old legend says that two night-prowling giants, a man and a woman, were traversing the fjord with their cow when they were surprised by the bright rays of daybreak. As a result of exposure to daylight, all three were turned into stone. Drangey represents the cow and Kerling (supposedly the female giant, the name means "Old Hag") is to the south of it. Karl (the male giant) was to the north of the island, but he disappeared long ago.

The bird life on Drangey is varied and lively, but the most common are diving birds: the guillemot, auk and puffin. The guillemot nests in the cliffs, while the auk mostly prefers deep cracks underneath the cliffs. The puffin, on the other hand, digs holes in the edge of the cliffs. In addition to these species, the black-legged kittiwake and fulmar nest in the cliffs and the raven and falcon also have their sanctuaries there.

Drangey has for ages been a harbinger of spring for the local residents. Every spring, they visited the island to collect both eggs and birds. They used ropes to climb down the fowling cliffs for the eggs, but the birds were caught using rafts placed on the sea underneath the cliffs. These rafts were covered with bird snares made of horsehair. The bird catchers mostly found shelter in sheds on the beach on the southernmost tip of the island. From this point, they also used to go fishing in their boats. At peak seasonal periods, there were as many as 200 men engaged in fowling and the catch was in excess of 200,000 birds when the yield was best. The use of snares was discontinued in 1966.

== In popular culture ==
The 2011 Icelandic film Stormland includes Drangey.
