= Tindastóll Mountain =

Mountain in Skagafjörður, Iceland

Tindastóll
- Eilífsfjall
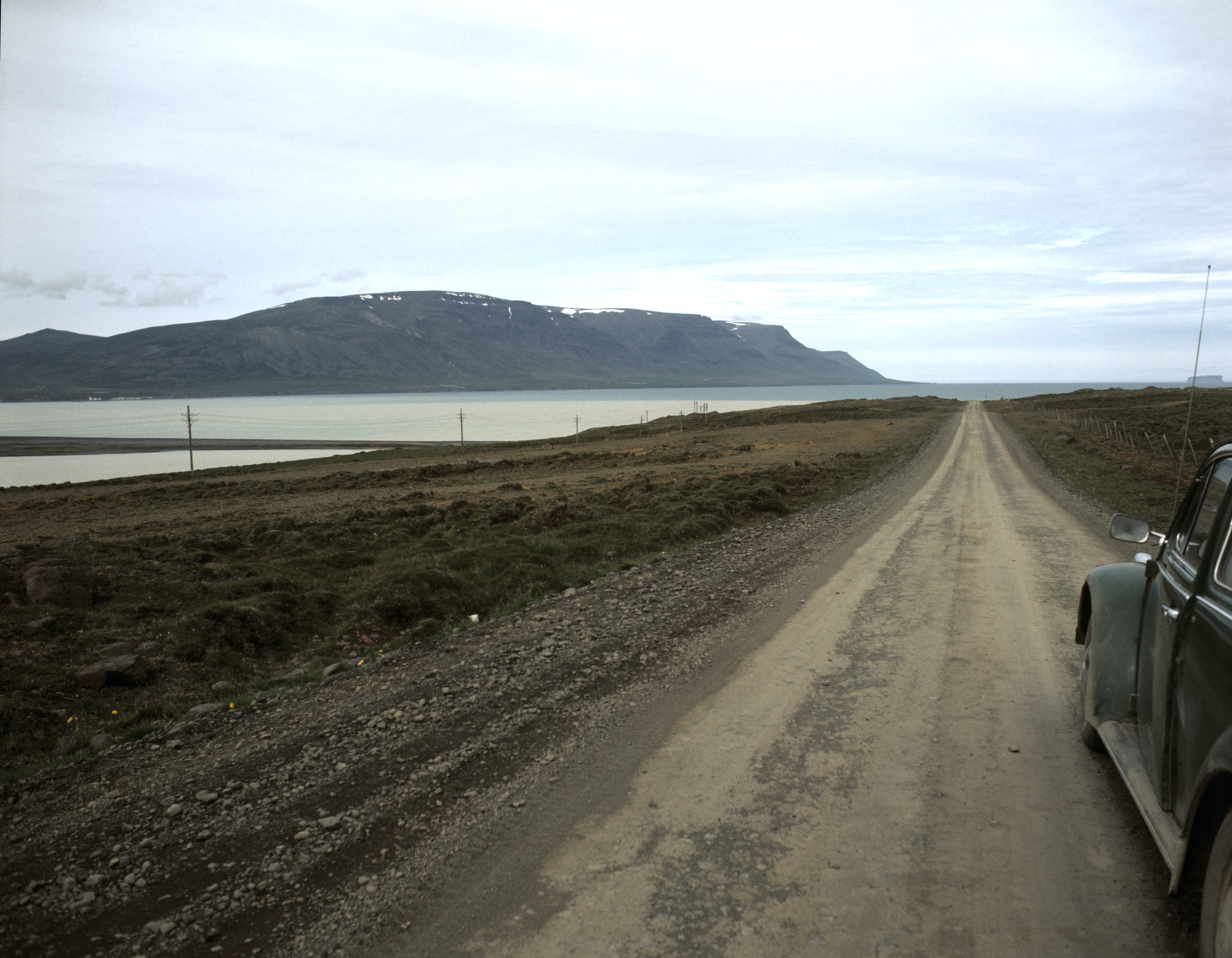

Highest point
- Elevation: 989 m (3,245 ft)
- Coordinates: 65°49′35″N 19°46′35″W

Naming
- Nickname: Stóllinn
- Language of name: Icelandic

Geography
- Location within Iceland
- Location: Skagafjörður, Iceland

Tindastóll (Icelandic pronunciation: [ˈtʰɪntaˌstoutl̥]) is a 989-meter-tall (3,245-foot) mountain located on the far west side of Skagafjörður County, Iceland and to the north of Sauðárkrókur. It is one of the best-known mountains in the region, and it provides an excellent view in clear weather. The name of the mountain is often shortened to Stóllinn ("the chair"), but it would have previously been called Eilífsfjall. It is said to have been named after the settler Eilífur örn ("the eagle") Atlason.

Tindastóll is a large mountain with a width of around 20 kilometers. At the eastern base the mountain, along the sea, is the district of Reykjaströnd, and to the west of the mountain is Laxárdalur. South and southwest of Tindastóll are Gönguskörð, and the northernmost part of the mountain continues into the sea; it is very difficult to get between Reykjaströnd and Laxárdalur via that route.

At the top of the mountain there is a pond and, according to a well-known folk tale, wishing stones float on the lake every year on the eve of John the Baptist's birthday (June 23, or Iceland's version of midsummer's eve). Many people often travel to the mountain for the occasion as well as at other times for the many popular hiking trails in the area.

There is also a ski resort in the western part of Tindastóll.

== See also ==
- Ungmennafélagið Tindastóll
