= Hreppur =

Type of Icelandic municipality

A hreppur (Icelandic pronunciation: [ˈr̥ɛhpʏr̥]) is a type of rural municipality in Iceland. These administrative units primarily consist of small rural villages and farms, often with few or no towns, and are overseen by a hreppstjóri [ˈr̥ɛhpˌstjouːrɪ].

The hreppur is one of Iceland’s oldest administrative units, likely dating back to before 1000 AD, when each hreppur was required to have at least twenty freeholders. Smaller units could be established with permission from the Lögrétta. The term (in its Old Norse form hreppr) is referenced in Icelandic legal texts such as the Gray Goose Laws (Grágás) and Law of Iceland (Jónsbók).

Unlike the chieftain-þing structure, the hreppur operated independently, collecting and distributing tithes and mandatory contributions designated for the poor. These contributions were allocated to various households based on their wealth and for specified periods. The hreppur also managed an early form of insurance, where a member who lost more than a quarter of their livestock to disease could recover half of the loss.

Today, the use of the term hreppur is declining, as urban communities merge into new municipalities.
