= Sauðárkrókur =

Town in Skagafjörður, Iceland

- Town
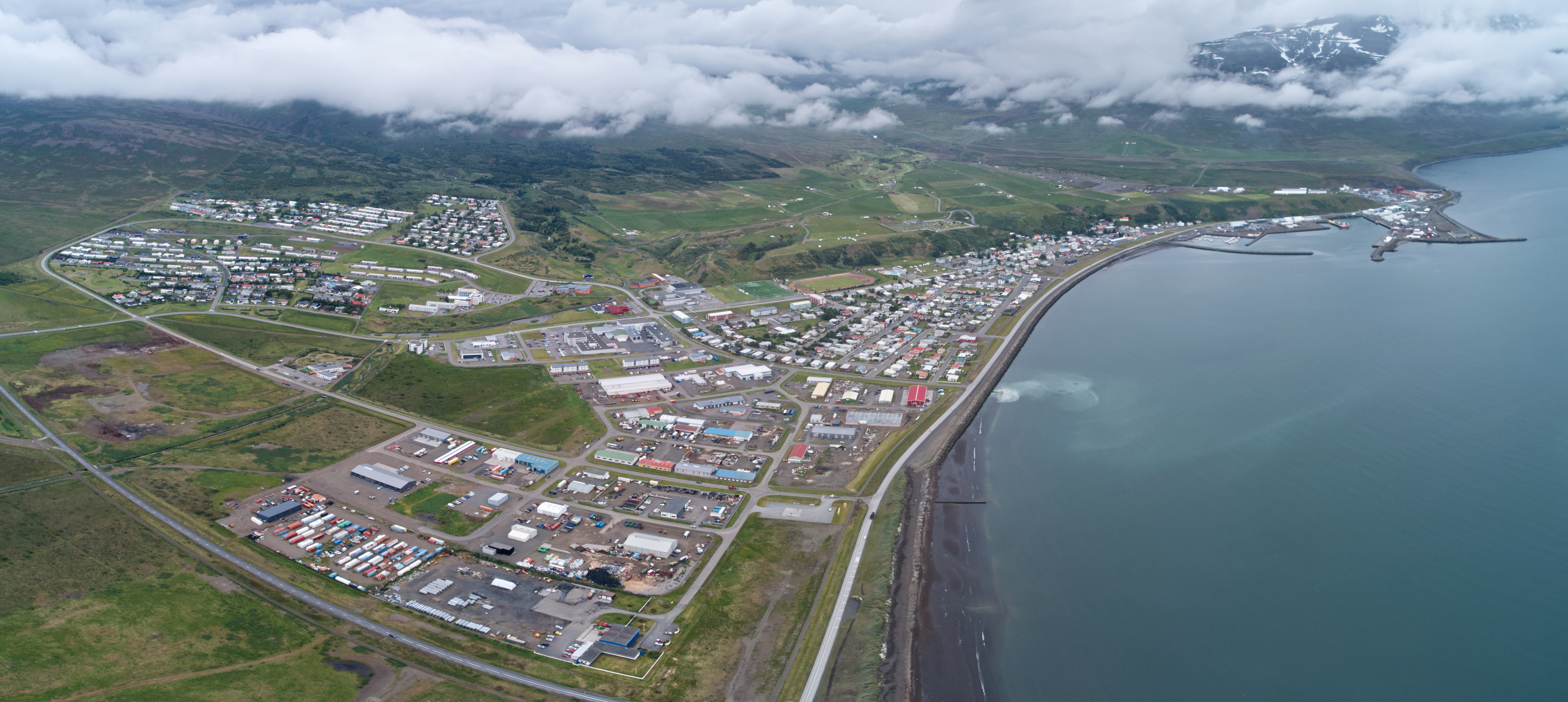
- Sauðárkrókur in 2025
- Nickname: Krókurinn
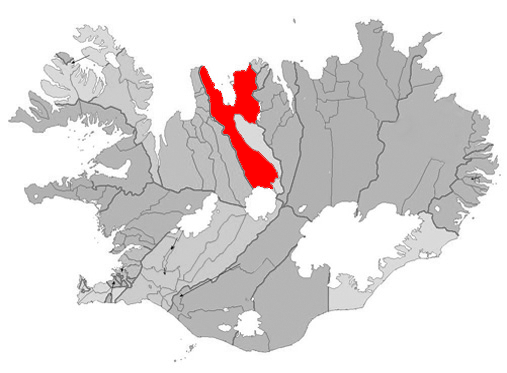
- Location of the Sveitarfélagið Skagafjörður

- Location in Iceland
- Coordinates: 65°44′N 19°38′W
- Country: Iceland
- Constituency: Northwest Constituency
- Region: Northwestern Region
- Municipality: Sveitarfélagið Skagafjörður

Government
  - District manager (Sveitarstjóri): Magnús Barðdal

Area
  - Total: 4.2 km^{2} (1.6 sq mi)

Population (2026)
  - Total: 2,672
- Time zone: UTC+0 (GMT)
- Postal code: 550
- Website: Official website

Sauðárkrókur (Icelandic pronunciation: [ˈsœyːðˌaurˌkʰrouːkʏr̥]) is a town on the Skagafjörður in northern Iceland. It is the seat of both the Sveitarfélagið Skagafjörður ('Municipality of Skagafjörður') and the Northwestern Region.

Sauðárkrókur is the largest town in Northwest Iceland and the second-largest town on the north coast of Iceland, with a population of 2,672. It is the centre for commerce and services in the district, and an important link in Iceland's food production. The population of Sauðárkrókur has grown steadily in recent years, and its economy is relatively diverse.

Economic mainstays are fisheries, dairy production, light industry and broad-based services such as computer and engineering operations, financials, consulting, design and printing. The natural hot pool located 15 kilometres (9 1/2 mi) north of Sauðárkrókur is mentioned in the Grettis saga.

== Etymology ==
Sauðárkrókur got its name from the creek that runs through the land. The creek is named Sauðá, and the name Sauðárkrókur indicates that this is the coast where Sauðá meets the Arctic Ocean. Directly translated to English, the name would be 'Sheep-river-hook'.

== History ==
=== First settlements ===
Iceland was settled in the late 9th century, mostly by Scandinavian Vikings. The Skagafjörður region had many settlers, who divided the land according to commonly acknowledged rules. The land where Sauðárkrókur stands was first taken by the Viking Sæmundr Suðureyski ("Sæmundur from the South Islands"). 'South Islands' is the name Vikings gave the Hebrides islands off the coast of Scotland), but as he was marking his land another Viking, called Skefill, successfully "stole" the land where the oldest part of the town is today. These settlers did not build their homes at Sauðárkrókur, and the current site of the town was not settled until about 1,000 years later.

=== Market and merchants ===
Docking ships in Skagafjörður was not an easy task for sailors and merchants. Few natural harbors are to be found, especially on the west coast of the fjord, and most merchants docked at the trading posts of Hofsós, Grafarós and Kolkuós on the east coast of the fjord. During the Danish monopoly (1602–1787) Hofsós was the only permitted trading post in Skagafjörður. At that time the river Héraðsvötn was a huge obstacle for those living on the west side of the fjord, and many people died crossing the river to reach the market. As the population on the west side of the valley grew, so did the need for an accessible market place; and several times privateers tried their luck by illegally trading from their ships by the shore of Sauðárkrókur. In 1856 Sauðárkrókur became a permitted trading post, and merchants were allowed to trade from their ships.

=== The first inhabitants ===
In 1871 the first real settlement at Sauðárkrókur took place. The blacksmith Árni Árnason, with his wife Sigríður Eggertsdóttir and several children, settled there to provide blacksmith services to the growing farming community in this prosperous region. The couple also decided to sell drinks and overnight services; this part of the business grew fast and earned Árni a new nickname, "Árni Vert" or "innkeeper Árni". In 1873 the first merchant settled in Sauðárkrókur. The shopkeeper Erlendur Hallsson built the second house here, trading from his living room. By 1900 around 400 inhabitants lived here, and the settlement was evolving into a fully formed village with a hospital, school and church.

== Climate ==
Sauðárkrókur has a mild subarctic climate (Köppen: Dfc) bordering on a tundra climate (ET). Average temperature year round in Sauðárkrókur is about 3.2 °C (37.8 °F), with an average low temperature of around −5 °C (23 °F) in the coldest months of the year (January–February).

Being located in the North Atlantic, the region is quite windy. However severe storms are unusual. Average wind speed in the town of Sauðárkrókur is 6.7 m/s. with wind directions from North and South to South-west. The average annual precipitation is about 460 mm (20 inches) distributed fairly evenly over the year, although spring and early summer seems to be the driest season.

Sauðárkrókur experiences midnight sun for 4 to 5 days around the time of the summer solstice. This is due to atmospheric refraction since the town lies just south of the Arctic Circle. Although Sauðárkrókur doesn't experience polar night, the shortest length of daylight is 3 hours 1 minute, from 11:46 UTC until 14:47 UTC on the winter solstice.

Climate data for Bergstaðir, 4 km (2.5 mi) from Sauðárkrókur, 1981–2010 normals, extremes 1978–2018
Month	Jan	Feb	Mar	Apr	May	Jun	Jul	Aug	Sep	Oct	Nov	Dec	Year
Record high °C (°F)	11.0 (51.8)	11.3 (52.3)	12.6 (54.7)	19.6 (67.3)	20.5 (68.9)	22.7 (72.9)	24.5 (76.1)	26.5 (79.7)	20.5 (68.9)	17.2 (63.0)	15.5 (59.9)	13.4 (56.1)	26.5 (79.7)
Mean daily maximum °C (°F)	1.2 (34.2)	1.3 (34.3)	1.9 (35.4)	4.7 (40.5)	8.8 (47.8)	12.3 (54.1)	13.8 (56.8)	13.3 (55.9)	10.0 (50.0)	5.4 (41.7)	2.8 (37.0)	1.7 (35.1)	6.4 (43.5)
Daily mean °C (°F)	−1.6 (29.1)	−1.9 (28.6)	−1.1 (30.0)	1.4 (34.5)	5.1 (41.2)	8.6 (47.5)	10.1 (50.2)	9.8 (49.6)	6.6 (43.9)	2.6 (36.7)	0.0 (32.0)	−1.1 (30.0)	3.2 (37.8)
Mean daily minimum °C (°F)	−4.6 (23.7)	−4.7 (23.5)	−3.8 (25.2)	−1.3 (29.7)	2.2 (36.0)	5.6 (42.1)	7.5 (45.5)	7.2 (45.0)	4.1 (39.4)	0.2 (32.4)	−2.7 (27.1)	−4.1 (24.6)	0.5 (32.9)
Record low °C (°F)	−19.2 (−2.6)	−19.9 (−3.8)	−22.1 (−7.8)	−14.6 (5.7)	−12.7 (9.1)	−3.2 (26.2)	1.6 (34.9)	−0.2 (31.6)	−6.1 (21.0)	−11.3 (11.7)	−17.2 (1.0)	−19.1 (−2.4)	−22.1 (−7.8)
Average precipitation mm (inches)	42.2 (1.66)	37.6 (1.48)	40.8 (1.61)	28.7 (1.13)	25.3 (1.00)	27.7 (1.09)	35.9 (1.41)	42.5 (1.67)	48.3 (1.90)	50.6 (1.99)	37.7 (1.48)	43.9 (1.73)	461.3 (18.16)
Average precipitation days (≥ 1.0 mm)	7.8	9.0	9.0	7.3	6.2	6.2	8.2	8.9	9.8	10.8	8.7	9.0	100.0
Average snowy days (≥ 0 cm)	19.2	17.1	16.7	8.1	1.3	0.0	0.0	0.0	0.4	5.3	13.2	17.3	98.6
Source 1: NOAA
Source 2: Icelandic Met Office (extremes)

== Transport ==
The town and neighbouring area is served by Sauðárkrókur Airport, although it does not have scheduled flights. The nearest airport with scheduled flights is Akureyri Airport, about 120 km (75 mi) away by road. The town is connected to the Route 1 via Varmahlíð through route 75 or alternatively via Blönduós through routes 744 and 74 (when road conditions are suitable). Reykjavík is about 300 km (186 mi) away by road.

== Sports ==
The town has a stadium, the Sauðárkróksvöllur, built in 2004. The local sports club is UMF Tindastóll.

== Notable people ==
- Sigurlaugur Elíasson (1957-) - painter and poet
- Eyjólfur Sverrisson (1968-) - national football team player and manager
- Ásgeir Ægisson (2001-) - musician, stage name Ouse
- Auðunn Blöndal (1980-) - television personality, actor and comedian
- Erla Þorsteinsdóttir (1933-2022) - singer
- Vilhjálmur Árnason (1983-) - politician
