= Skagafjörður =

Fjord and region in northern Iceland

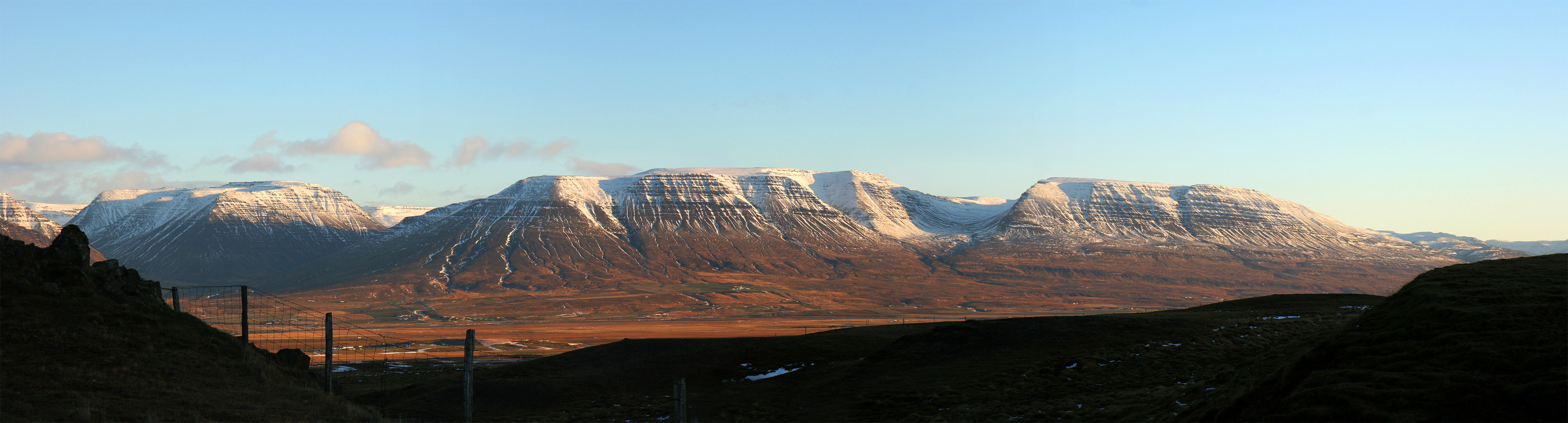
- Panoramic view east across Skagafjörður valley, from Vatnsskarð pass

- Location in Iceland
- Coordinates: 65°54′N 19°35′W
- Country: Iceland

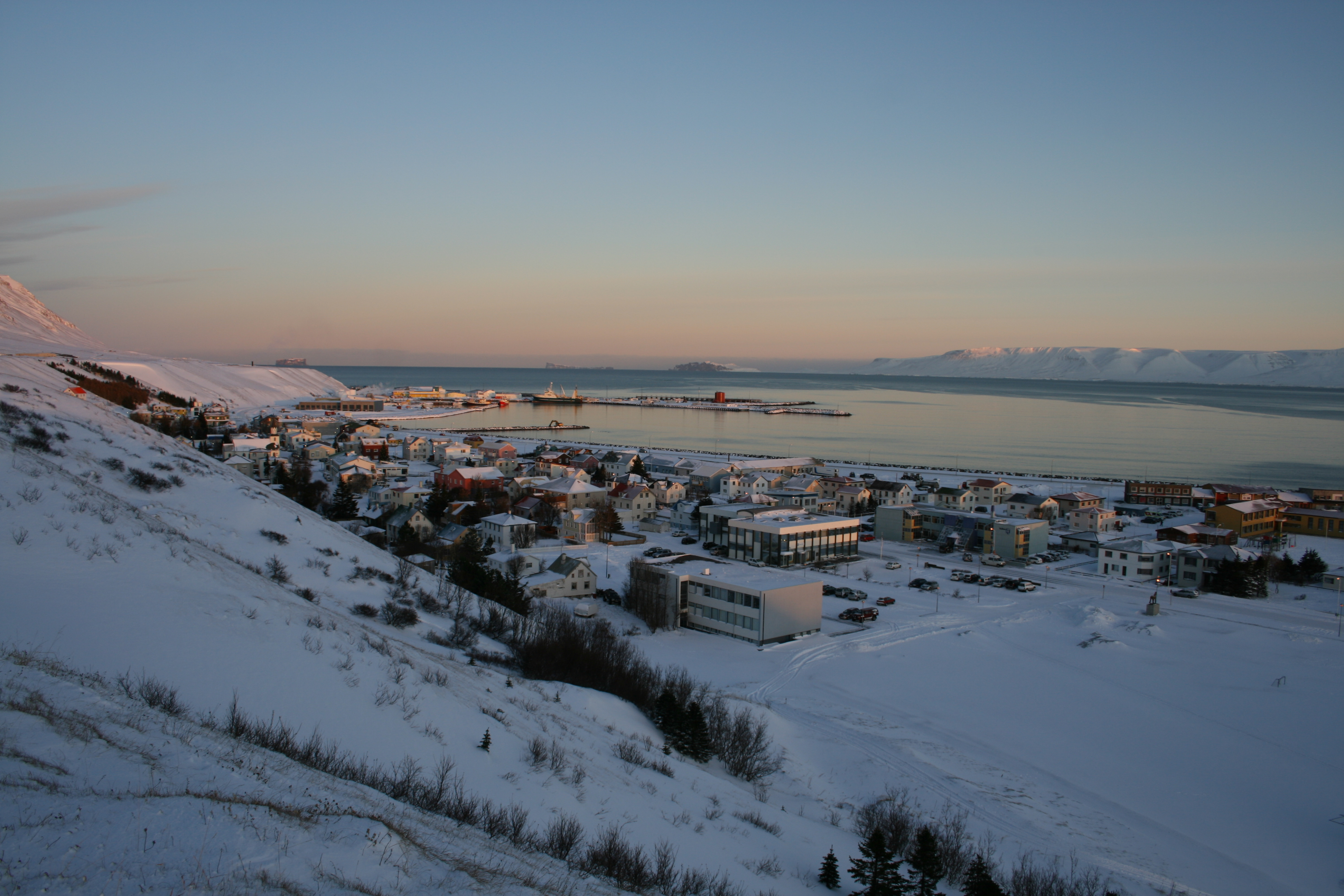
The fjord Skagafjörðdur, seen from Sauðárkrókur

Skagafjörður (Icelandic pronunciation: [ˈskaːɣaˌfjœrðʏr̥]) is a deep fjord and its valley in northern Iceland.

== Location ==
Skagafjörður, the fjord, is about 40 km long and 15 km wide, situated between Tröllaskagi to the east and the Skagi Peninsula to the west. The Mælifellshnjúkur mountain is on the western part of Skagafjörður. There are two municipalities in the area, Skagafjörður Municipality (approx. 4140 inhabitants) and Akrahreppur Municipality (approx. 210 inhabitants).

This is one of Iceland's most prosperous agricultural regions, with widespread dairy and sheep farming in addition to the horse breeding for which the district is famed. Skagafjörður is the only county in Iceland where horses outnumber people.

It is a centre for agriculture, and some fisheries are also based in the settlements of Sauðárkrókur and Hofsós. The people living in Skagafjörður have a reputation for choir singing, horsemanship, and gatherings. There are three islands in the bay: Málmey, Drangey and Lundey [ˈlʏntˌeiː] (Puffin Island).

The bay is located in a submerged glacial valley which is continued southwards by a plain in which lies the delta of the Héraðsvötn river. The main settlement of this valley is Varmahlíð.

== Sources ==
- "Skagafjörður.is – Um Skagafjörð – Landfræðilegar upplýsingar". Archived from the original on 4 November 2005.
