= Akrahreppur =

- Former municipality
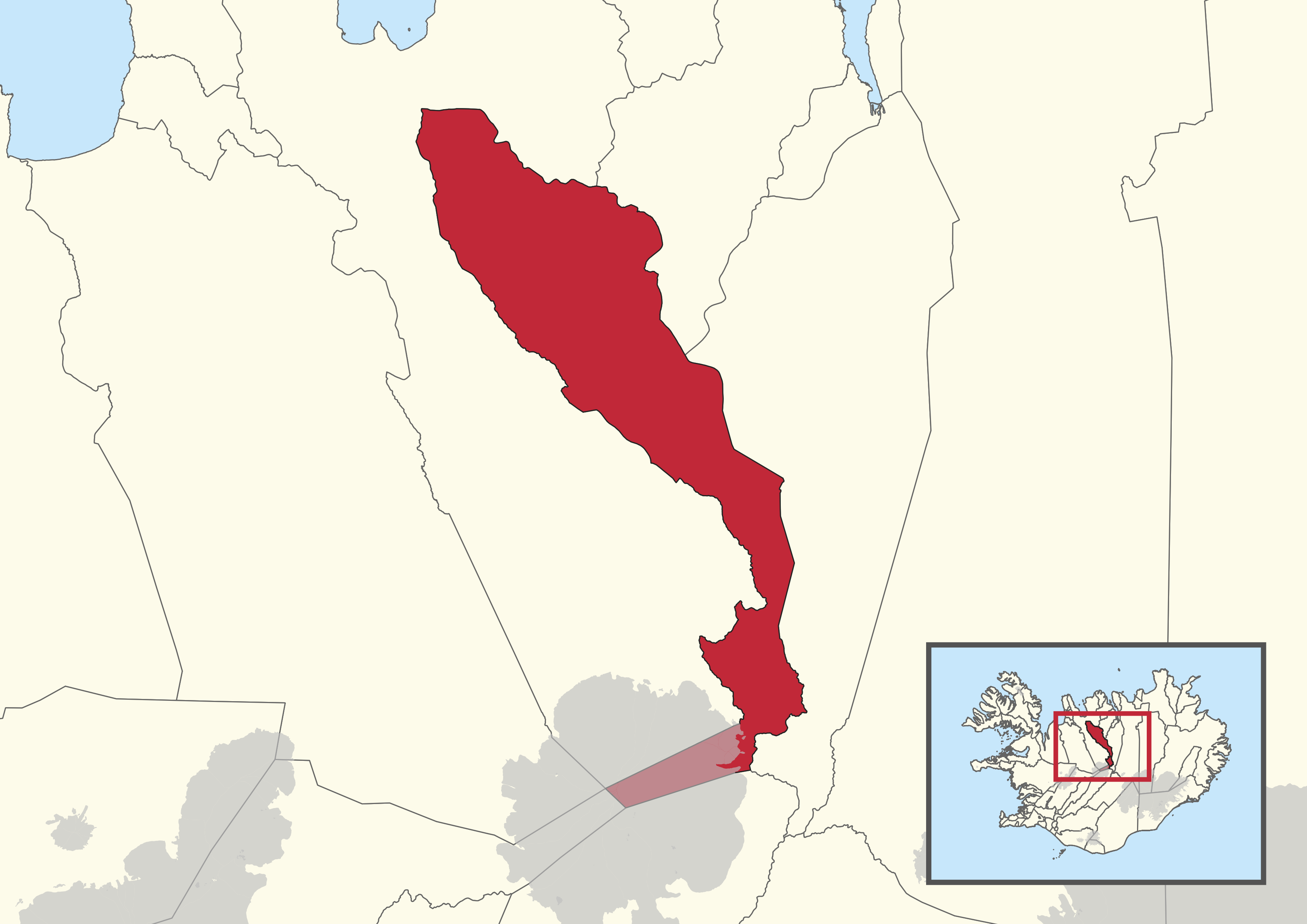
- Location of the municipality

- Location within Iceland
- Coordinates: 65°27′25″N 18°57′41″W
- Country: Iceland
- Region: Northwestern Region
- Constituency: Northwest Constituency
- Municipality: Skagafjörður
- Named for: Akrar (Skagafjörður)
- Towns and Farms: Akrar (Skagafjörður), Blönduhlíð, Bóla, Flatatunga, Flugumýri, Fremri-Kot, Hjaltastaðahvammur, Kjálki, Miklibær, Silfrastaðir, Úlfsstaðir

Area
  - Total: 1,364 km^{2} (527 sq mi)

Population
  - Total: 208
  - Density: 0.15/km^{2} (0.39/sq mi)

Akrahreppur (Icelandic pronunciation: [ˈaːkraˌr̥ɛhpʏr̥], regionally also [ˈaːkʰra-]), previously called Blönduhlíðarhreppur, is a former municipality, or hreppur, situated in the Northwestern Region of Iceland, and located east of the Héraðsvötn, north of the Kyrfisá, and leading south to Hofsjökull. It is divided into a range of villages, including Ábær. In February 2022, residents of Akrahreppur and the neighboring municipality of Skagafjörður voted to combine the two municipalities. In June 2022 the merger was formalized under the name of Skagafjörður.

Agriculture is the main industry in Akrahreppur and the area is sparsely populated. There are four churches in Akrahreppur in Flugumýri, Miklibær, Silfrastaðir, and Ábær in Austurdalur, but the Ábær parish is now completely abandoned.

A small amount of geothermal energy is used in some places in Akrahreppur, and a swimming pool was built in Víðivellir in 1938, but it is no longer in use. Now a heating utility system has been built from Varmahlíð, and it services almost all of Blönduhlíð.

== Geography ==
The municipality spans all Blönduhlíð and Norðurádalur, Kjálki, and Austurdalur, except for the town of Bústaðir, which belongs to Skagafjörður County. Some abandoned farms in Vallhólmur also belong to Akrahreppur although they are now west of the Héraðsvötn because the boundary moved. Extensive pastureland, in Silfrastaðir and Nýibær, belong to the municipality.

== History ==
Akrahreppur is the setting of many major events in the Age of the Sturlungs, including the Battle of Örlygsstaðir, the Battle of Haugsnes, and the Flugumýri Arson.

The poet Hjálmar Jónsson lived in various towns in Akrahreppur during the 19th century and is named after one of them, Bóla in Blönduhlíð.

From 1949 to 2006, the hreppur's elementary school was the Héðinsminni community center in Stóra-Akrar, but in the wake of a dispute between parents and teachers, it was shut down, and since then the students have been driven to a school in Varmahlíð.

== Hreppur Council ==
Five representatives sat on the Akrahreppur council who were voted in through proportional representation every four years. The last Akrahreppur council was elected in the hreppur committee election on May 26, 2018.

=== Council Chairs ===
- 1875–1878 Gísli Þorláksson in Hjaltastaðir
- 1878–1881 Þorkell Pálsson in Frostastaðir
- 1881–1883 Páll Pálsson in Syðri-Brekkum
- 1883–1886 Rögnvaldur Björnsson in Réttarholt
- 1886–1889 Þorvaldur Arason in Flugumýri
- 1889–1901 Sigtryggur Jónatansson in Syðri-Brekkur and Framnes
- 1901–1937 Gísli Björnsson in Stóru-Akrar and Vaglar
- 1937–1958 Jóhannes Steingrímsson in Silfrastaðir
- 1958–1986 Jóhann Lárus Jóhannesson in Silfrastaðir
- 1986–2002 Broddi Björnsson in Framnes
- 2002–2018 Agnar Halldór Gunnarsson in Miklibær
- 2018–2022 Hrefna Jóhannesdóttir

== Localities ==
- Ábær
- Miklibær
- Silfrastaðir
