= Djúpadalsá =

River in Skagafjörður, Iceland

Location
- Country: Iceland
- County: Skagafjörður (municipality)
- District: Blönduhlíð

Physical characteristics
- Source: Grænuvatn lakes
  - elevation: 900 meters
- Mouth
  - coordinates: 65°33′13.59″N 19°16′47.36″W

Basin features
- Tributaries
  - left: Tungufjallsá river

Djúpadalsá river, or Dalsá for short, is a spring creek in the Blönduhlíð district of Skagafjörður, Iceland. It originates in Djúpárdalur valley, which runs deep into the eastern Tröllaskagi mountain range. It is south of Glóðafeykir and south of the river the valley is named after, Akradalur valley, which belongs to Stóru-Akrar. The valley forks at Tungufjall mountain where the Tungufjallsá river flows into the Djúpadalsá from the northeast. The Djúpadalsá river's source is in the Grænuvatn lakes, at around an altitude of 900 meters.

The mouth of the Djúpadalsá river, right next to the Djúpidalur farm in the middle of the valley, flows into a deep gorge and, where the valley ends, the river creates expansive, triangular, sandbars that are stony with thick patches of vegetation. The river has continuously meandered back and forth around the sandbars and divided the channel, however there is now a levee at the riverbed's southernmost sandbars, between the Syðsta-Grund and Minni-Akrar farms. In July 1954, when northern Iceland was beset by heavy rains resulting in landslides that caused a lot of damage to the Ytri-Kot and Fremri-Kot farms, the river was dammed by landslides at the opening of Dalsdalur, but the river ultimately broke through the dam, causing a flash flood that rushed over many of the sandbars and damaged a lot of plants and fences.

In 1246, the Battle of Haugsnes was fought on the sandbars of Djúpadalsá. The river used to flow much further out than it does now, so the battlefield is now located south of the river.
