= Akrar (Skagafjörður) =

Group of farms in Skagafjörður, Iceland

Coordinates: 65°32′17″N 19°19′09″W

Akrar Akratorfa
- Farm
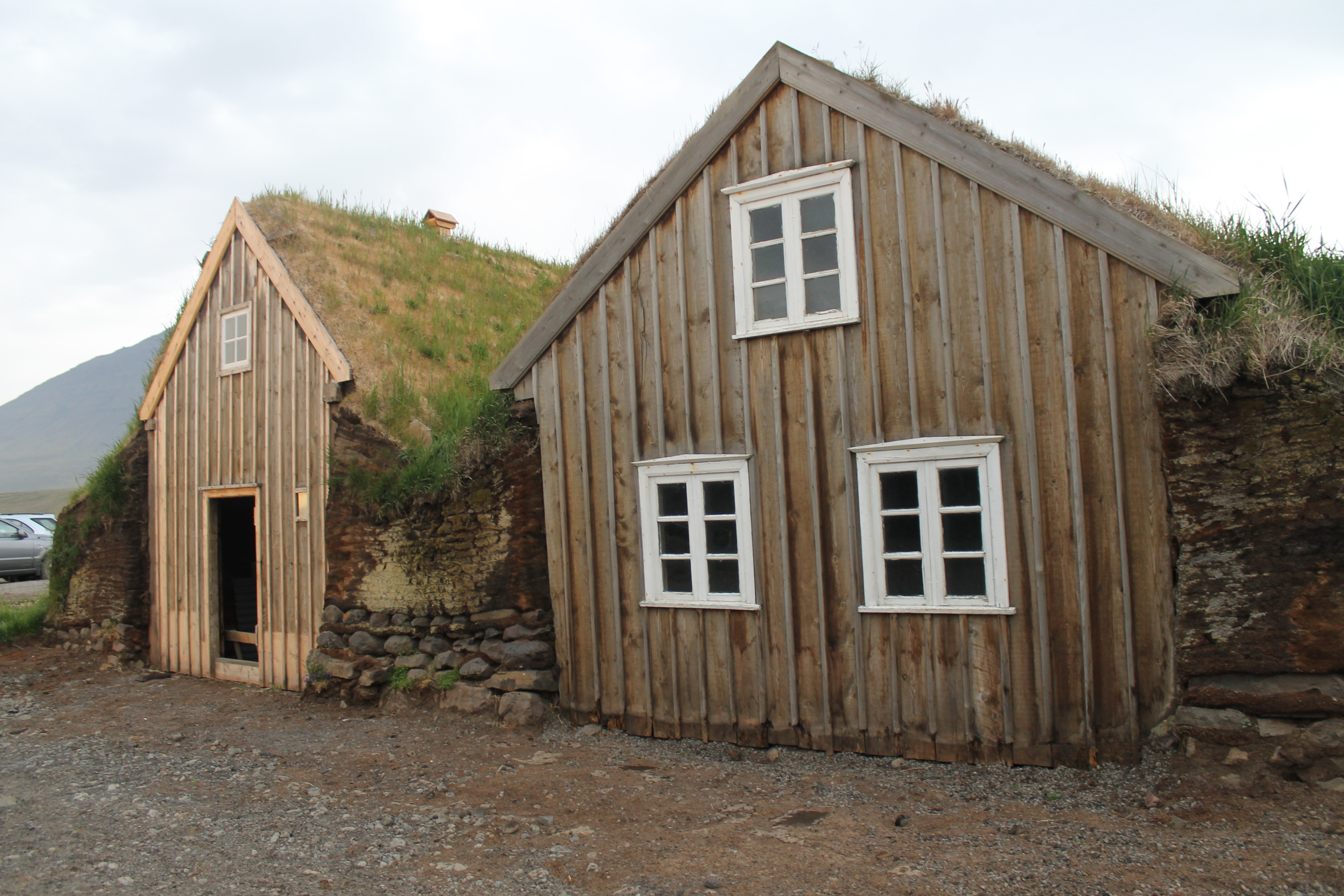
- Old farms in Akrar
- Interactive map of Akrar
- Country: Iceland
- County: Skagafjörður (municipality)
- District: Blönduhlíð

Akrar is a cluster of farms at the base of Akrafjall mountain in the Blönduhlíð district of Skagafjörður, Iceland. There are four farms, located in close proximity, collectively named Akratorfa: Minni-Akrar, Stóru-Akrar, Höskuldsstaðir, and Miðhús. Akrar includes the Akradalur valley, which goes far into the mountains east of Blönduhlíð.

The lögréttumaður Eggert Jónsson had a residence in Akrar, but his son Jón Eggertsson managed the abbey in Möðruvellir. There used to be a ferry landing on the Héraðsvötn at Akrar, and by 1930, it was the last cable ferry.

== Akratorfa ==
Akratorfa consists of several farms and is located just outside the deserted farms of Vaglagerði and Grundarkot, along with the farm Þorleifstaðir. These farms are named after the farm Stóru-Akrar (or "Akrir" as some in Blönduhlíð also call it). Akrar, Akratorfan, and Stóru-Akrar are all names typically used to describe the same group of farms, depending on who one asks.

=== Stóru-Akrar ===
Stóru-Akrar ("Big Akrar") is the most well-known of the Akratorfa farms, where there was a manor and, for a long time, one of the main, large farms and settlements in Skagafjörður. Well-known chieftains, leaders, governors, sheriffs, and lawyers served there. The priest Björn Brynjólfsson lived there in the early 14th century, and his descendants dwelled there for centuries. Björn's son Brynjólfur ríki ("the rich") Björnsson (died 1381) and his son was also called Björn (died 1403). His daughter was Sigríður. She was married the lawyer Þorsteinn Ólafsson in the Hvalsey Church in Greenland in 1408, and the record of the wedding is the last reliable source about Norse settlement there. Sigríður and Þorsteinn's only daughter, called Akra-Kristín, was first married to the lawyer Helgi Guðnason and later to the governor Torfi Arason. Akra-Kristín and Helgi's daughter was Ingveldur, wife of Þorleifur Björnsson, governor of Reykhólar.

Ingveldur and Þorleifur's daughters, Guðný and Helga, acquired Akrar from their parents. Guðný, who was known as Akrar-Guðný, lived there for a long time along with her husband, the lawyer Grímur Jónsson. The other portion of the land was acquired by Gunnar Gíslason in Víðivellir, and their daughter was Solveig kvennablómi ("the stately woman"), wife of Arngrímur Jónsson. It seems that Arngrímur lived in Akrar for a while, followed by his son Jón. He sold the land to Eggert Jónsson in 1630 and his descendants lived there until 1743 when it was sold to the sýslumaður—and later sheriff—Skúli Magnússon. From 1743 to 1745, he built an impressive turf house that was inhabited until 1938; parts of it are still standing. The house has been restored and is in the care of the National Museum of Iceland.

There was a church in Stóru-Akrar from early in the settlement of Iceland, but it was decommissioned in 1765 on order of the king of Denmark.

Héðinsminni is the Akrahreppur community center in Stóru-Akrar. The house was built between 1919–1921 and was dedicated on June 13, 1921. It was built using funds from the farmer Símon Eiríksson of Lítladalur valley, donated in memory of his son Skarphéðinn Símonarson who drowned in the Héraðsvötn near Grundarstokkur on November 15, 1914. The house was originally named Héðinshöll although it is typically called Þinghúsið. In 1960–1961, it was remodeled and enlarged, and received the name Héðinsminni (Héðin's memorial). Around 1990, the house was enlarged and remodeled again. It was the location of the hreppur's school for decades, until it was decommissioned in 2006.

=== Minni-Akrar ===
Minni-Akrar ("Smaller Akrar") is located off the side of the highway. The poet Hjálmar Jónsson of Bóla (known as Bólu-Hjálmar) lived in Minni-Akrar for 27 years. He was kicked out and forced to move to Grundargerði, located in the same district. Hjálmar's poetry was, in large part, written while he was in Minni-Akrar, where he lived for much longer than he did at Bóla, although that is the farm that he is named after.

=== Höskuldstaðir ===
The farmer Stefán Jónsson lived in Höskuldstaðir for a long time. He was a scholar and wrote works about issues in Skagafjörður.
