= Akra-Kristín Þorsteinsdóttir =

15th-century Icelandic noblewoman

Kristín Þorsteinsdóttir
- Born: c. 1410; Akrar, Iceland
- Died: c. 1490
- Other names: Akra-Kristín
- Spouse(s): Helgi Guðnason (until 1440); Torfi Arason (until 1459)
- Children: Ingveldur Helgadóttir, Málmfríður Torfadóttir, Guðrún Torfadóttir

Kristín Þorsteinsdóttir (c. 1410 – 1490), also named Akra-Kristín after the farm Akrar in Blönduhlíð in Skagafjörður, Iceland where she lived, was an Icelandic noblewoman in the 15th century.

Kristín was the only daughter of the lawyer Þorsteinn Ólafsson and his wife Sigríður Björnsdóttir whose marriage certificate from the Hvalsey church in Greenland dated September 16, 1408 is the last written source of Norse settlement in Greenland. Kristín inherited a lot of wealth from her parents. Her first husband was the lawyer Helgi Guðnason who died in 1440. Kirstín then married the magistrate Torfi Arason who died while abroad in 1459. Kristín continued living in Akra after Torfi's death and lived to an old age. She was renowned in her time for being one of the richest women in the country and marrying two powerful aristocrats.

Kristín and Helgi's daughter Ingveldur, wife of the Reykhólar magistrate Þorleifur Björnsson, and the farmer Þorsteinn of Reynir in Mýrdalur. Kirstín had two daughters with Torfi: Málmfríður and Guðrún (mistress of Einar Benediktsson, abbot of Munkaþverá).
