= Sögufélag Skagfirðinga =

Historical society dedicated to Skagafjörður, Iceland

Skagafjörður History Society
- Sögufélag Skagfirðinga
- Formation: 1937
- Location: Sauðárkrókur, Iceland
- Director: Hjalti Pálsson
- Website: https://sogufelag.skagafjordur.is/

Sögufélag Skagfirðinga (Skagafjörður History Society) is an organization whose goal is to document everything pertaining to the history of Skagafjörður and publish information about the county. The organization is the country’s oldest still-operating regional history society—it was founded in 19372—and has published over 80 works related to Skagafjörður's history.

Since 1966, the Skagafjörður History Society has published the journal Skagfirðingabók ("The Book of the People of Skagafjörður"). The organization’s main project in recent years has been to publish Byggðasaga Skagafjarðar ("The Regional History of Skagafjörður") and there are seven published volumes so far. They have also published the series Skagfirskar æviskrár ("Skagafjörður's Collective Biography").

The current director of Sögufélag Skagfirðinga is Hjalti Pálsson.

== Sögufélag Skagfirðinga's early publications ==
- Skagfirsk fræði ("Skagafjöður Studies") 1–105
  - Magnús Jónsson: Ásbirningar, 1939
  - Ólafur Lárusson: Landnám í Skagafirði ("Settlement of Skagafjörður"), 1940
  - Margeir Jónsson: Frá miðöldum í Skagafirði ("Middle Ages and onward in Skagafjörður"), 1941
  - Brynleifur Tobíasson: Heim að Hólum ("Home in Hólar"), 1943
  - Glóðafeykir. Úr sögu Skagfirðinga ("Glóðafeykir: From Skagafjörður's History")
  - Magnús Jónsson: Ríki Skagfirðinga. Frá Haugsnessfundi til dauða Gizurar jarls ("Skagafjörður's Government, from the Discovery of Haugnes to the Death of the Jarl Gizur")
  - Drangey, 1950
  - Skagfirðingaþættir, 1952
  - Skagfirðingaþættir, 1956
- Jarða- og búendatal í Skagafjarðarsýslu 1781–1958, 1–4, ("Register of Properties and Farmers in Skagafjörður County, 1781–1958")1949–1959
