= Pétur Pétursson (bishop) =

Fourth Bishop of Iceland

The Right Reverend Pétur Pétursson
- Bishop of Iceland
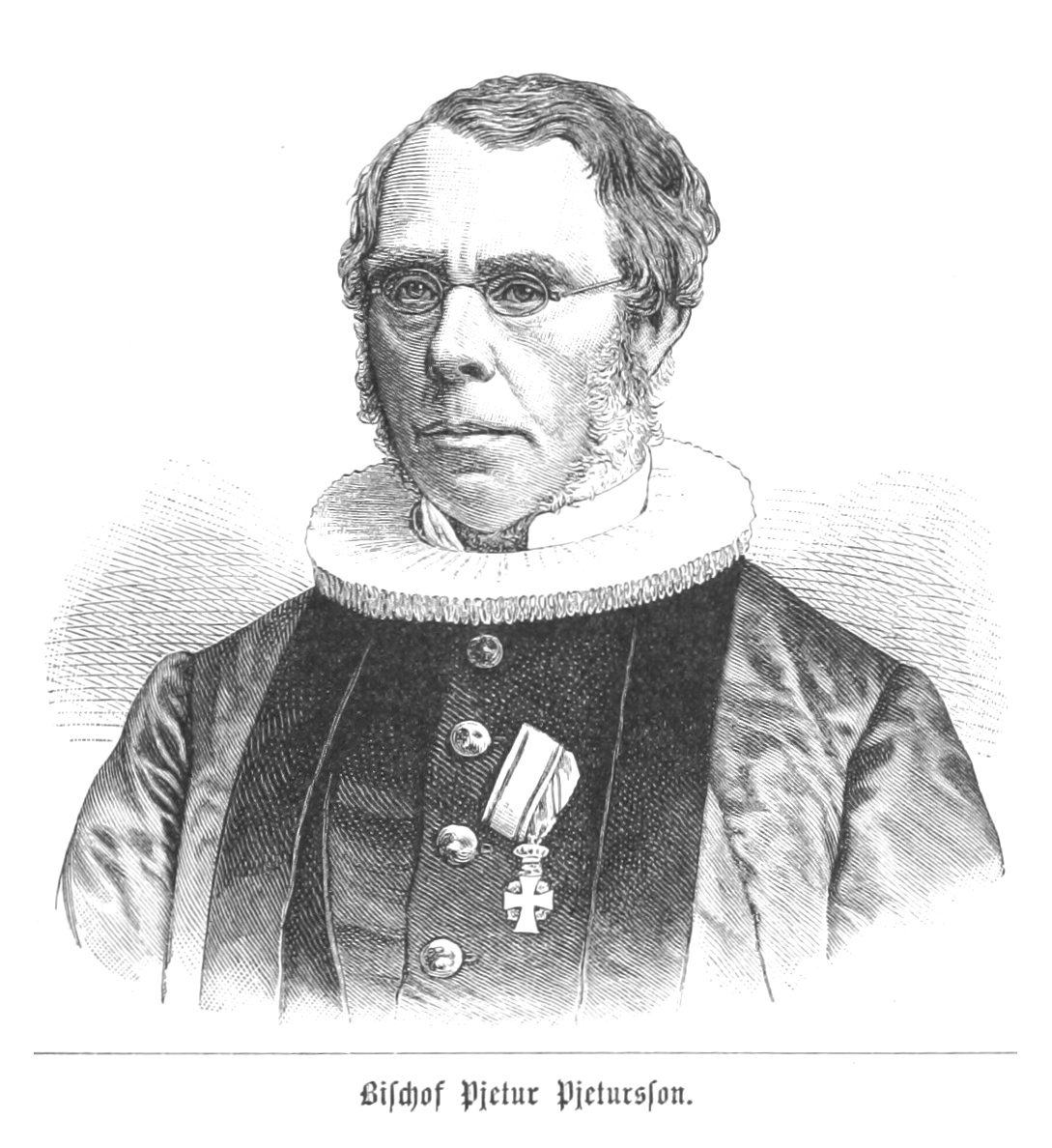
- Church: Church of Iceland
- Diocese: Iceland
- Appointed: 23 February 1866
- In office: 1866–1889
- Predecessor: Helgi G. Thordersen
- Successor: Hallgrímur Sveinsson

Orders
- Consecration: 3 June 1866 by Hans Lassen Martensen

Personal details
- Born: October 3, 1808 Blönduhlíð, Iceland
- Died: May 15, 1891 (aged 82)
- Denomination: Lutheran
- Parents: Péturs Péturssonar & Thóra Brynjólfsdóttir
- Spouse: Anna Sigríður; Sigríður Bogadóttir
- Children: 3
- Education: University of Copenhagen

Pétur Pétursson (3 October 1808 – 15 May 1891) was a prominent political leader in Iceland, eventually becoming the fourth Bishop of Iceland from 1866 to 1889.

== Biography ==
Pétursson was born in Blönduhlíð, the son of Péturs Péturssonar, a professor in Víðivellir and his second wife, Thóra Brynjólfsdóttir. He was one of the well-known Víðivellir brothers, the others were Supreme Court judge Jón Pétursson and Brynjólfur Pétursson, a lawyer.

Pétur and his brother Brynjólfur were educated by the Reverend Einar Thorlacius in Goðdalir and later in Eyjafjörður. Jónas Hallgrímsson was their fellow student. He earned a theology degree from the University of Copenhagen in 1834. He served as a pastor at Helgafell and Stedarstaður and a pastor in the Snæfellsnes peninsula. In 1847 he was appointed director of the seminary. He was appointed bishop of Iceland in 1866 and served his office for 23 years. He retired on April 16, 1889. He was king's elected member of parliament from 1849 to 1887 and mayor of Reykjavík from 1849 to 1851 and 1855 to 1856. He served as speaker of the Althing from 1879 to 1881. He is also the author of numerous books.

His first wife was Anna Sigríður Aradóttir from Flugumýri who died in 1839 after a short marriage. His second wife was Sigríður Bogadóttir, the daughter of Boga Benediktsson and Jarðrúður Jónsdóttir.
