= Úlfsstaðir =

Farm in Skagafjörður, Iceland

Coordinates: 65.4747°N 19.2512°W

- Farm
- Interactive map of Úlfsstaðir
- Country: Iceland
- Country: Skagafjörður (municipality)
- Hreppur: Lýtingsstaðahreppur
- District: Blönduhlíð
- Named for: Hjálmólfur, one of Iceland's early settlers

Úlfsstaðir is a farm on the seaward side of the Blönduhlíð district in Skagafjörður, Iceland. It has been conjectured to have been the homestead of the settler Hjálmólfur (also called Hjálmúlfur) who settled the land there; the land was named after him.

Úlfshaugur is between Úlfsstaðir and Kúskerpi. which, according to local lore, is said have been where Hjálmólfur was buried. He was a pagan and, reportedly, told his heirs to bury him where he was least likely to hear the toll of the church bells. Úlfshaugur is directly between the Silfrastaðir and Miklibær churches, but by the time the legend came to be, it had probably been forgotten that this was also the location of a church in the Catholic era (one that was quickly decommissioned), so Hjálmólfur was not ultimately able to escape the tolling of the bells. The cemetery there was turned into a potato field later on and human bones are occasionally dug up along with the potatoes.
