= Djúpidalur =

Farm in Skagafjörður, Iceland

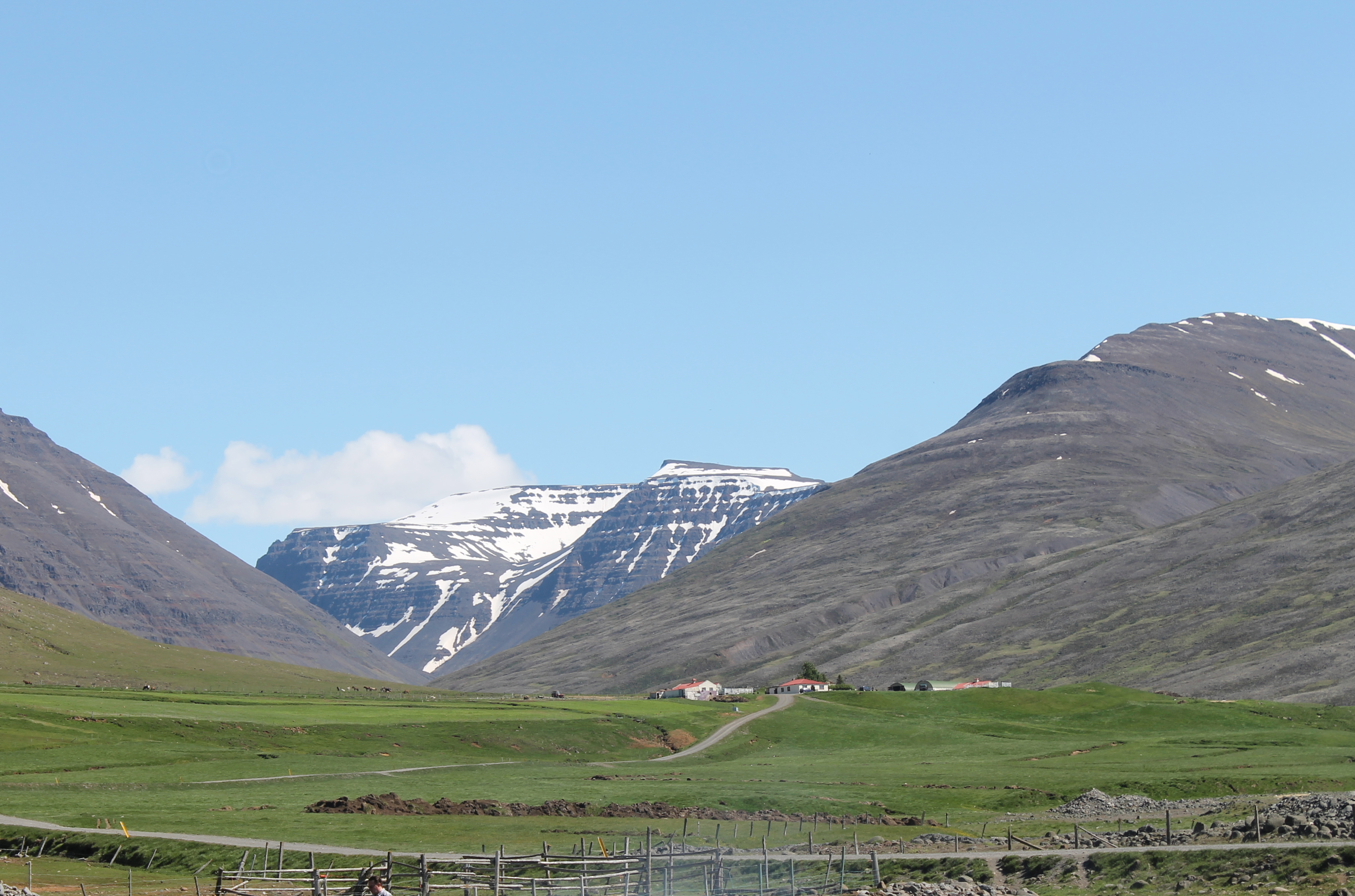
- Djúpidalur farm
- Interactive map of Djúpidalur
- Country: Iceland
- County: Skagafjörður (municipality)
- District: Blönduhlíð

Djúpidalur is a farm in the Blönduhlíð district of Skagafjörður, Iceland. It is located in the mouth of Dalsdalur valley, which runs eastward and is located south of Glóðafeykir mountain. The valley branches around Tungufjall mountain (one of three mountains to share that name in the Blönduhlíðarfjall mountains) and the branches run deep into the mountain range. Djúpadalsá, also called Dalsá, flows through the valley and is in a deep, rather large gorge at the outer end of the valley. The river has formed extensive sandbars in the lowlands that have thick patches of vegetation. The Battle of Haugsnes was fought on these sandbars in 1246. There was a church or chapel in Djúpidalur for centuries but it was decommissioned early in the 18th century.

Mera-Eiríkur Bjarnason, a farmer in Djúpidalur starting in 1733, was famous for his horses. He got into a dispute in Stóru-Akrar with sheriff Skúli Magnússon who tried, but failed, to prove that Mera-Eiríkur was committing tax fraud. The Djúpidalur clan is descended from Mera-Eiríkur and still lives there today.
