= Frederick Howell =

Frederick Howell may refer to:

- Fred Howell (1907–1975), British trade unionist
- Frederick W. W. Howell (1857–1901) was a British explorer, artist, and photographer
