= Hvalsey Church =

Preserved Norse church ruins in Greenland

Coordinates: 60.828664°N 45.781656°W

- Hvalsø Kirke
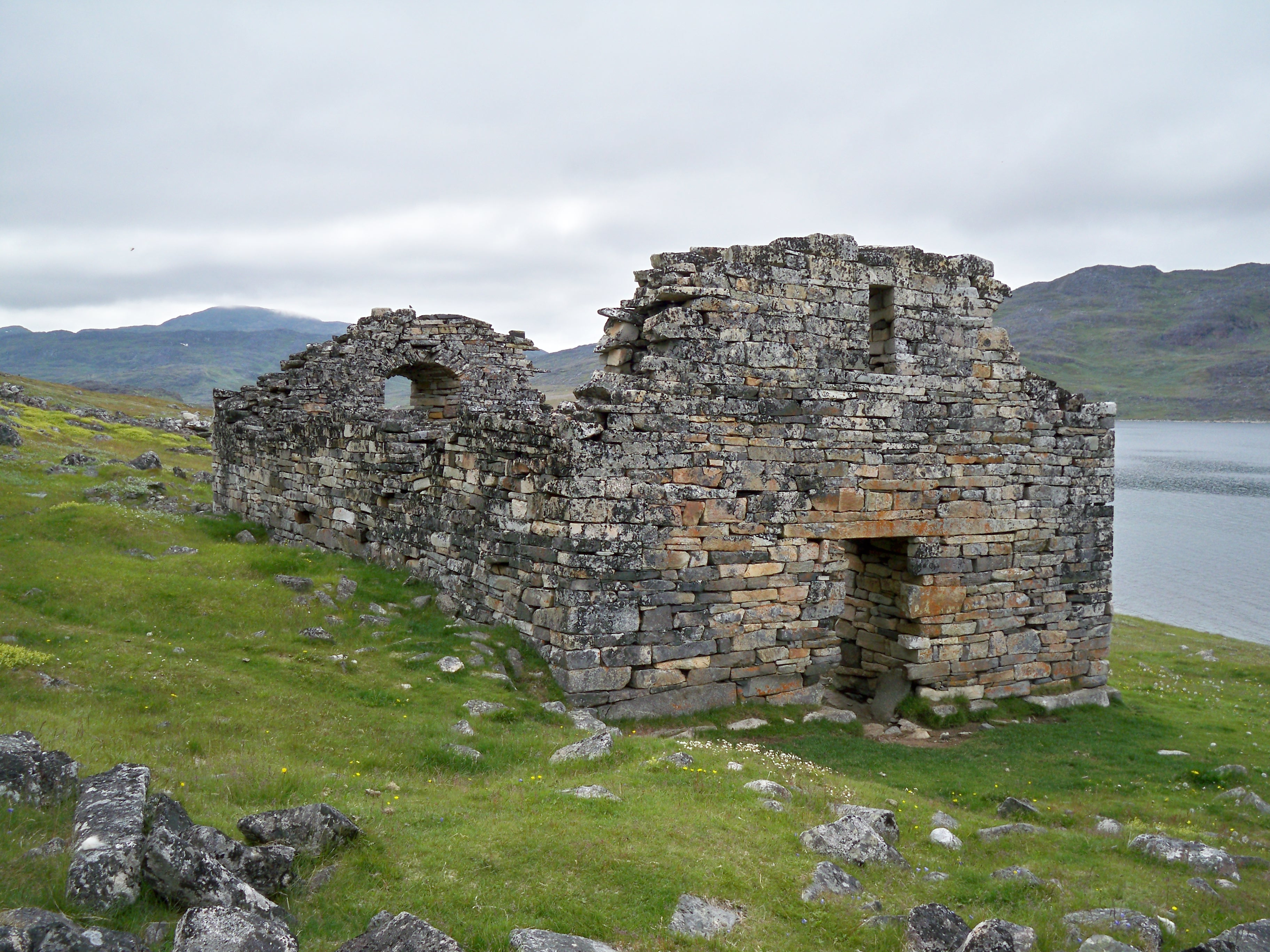
- Hvalsey Church ruins

- Location within Greenland
- Location: Hvalsey
- Country: Greenland
- Denomination: Roman Catholic

History
- Status: Ruins
- Founded: 12th century

Specifications
- Length: 16 metres (52 ft 6 in)
- Width: 8 metres (26 ft 3 in)

Administration
- Diocese: Garðar

Hvalsey Church (Danish: Hvalsø Kirke; Old Norse: Hvalseyjarfjarðarkirkja) was a Catholic church at the abandoned Greenlandic Norse homestead of Hvalseyjarfjord (near modern-day Qaqortoq). The best preserved Norse ruins in Greenland, the church was also the location of the last written record of the Greenlandic Norse, a wedding in September 1408.

== History ==
According to the sagas, the land around Hvalsey was claimed by Thorkell Farserk, a relative of Erik the Red. Christianity arrived in Greenland around the year 1000 and churches began to be built in the country.

In his description of affairs in Greenland, by Ívar Bárðarson, the Norwegian bishop's emissary to Garðar in the late 14th Century, he states that the homestead is a Norwegian royal manor called Þjóðhildarstaðir.

It is thought that Hvalsey Church was built in the early 14th century, but archaeological finds hint that this was not the first church in this site. The church is mentioned in several late medieval documents as one of the 10-14 parish churches in the Eastern Settlement.

The church hosted the wedding of Thorstein Olafsson and Sigrid Björnsdóttir on either 14 or 16 September 1408. The wedding was mentioned in letters from a priest at Garðar and by several Icelanders, and is the last written record of the Greenlandic Norse. The married couple later settled in Olafsson's native Iceland.

According to Inuit legend, there was open war between the Norse chief Ungortoq and the Inuk leader K'aissape. The Inuit made a massive attack on Hvalsey and burned the Norse inside their houses but Ungortoq escaped with his family. K'aissape defeated him after a long pursuit which ended near Cape Farewell. However, according to archaeological studies, there is no sign of a conflagration.

The site is now part of a sheep farm.

== Buildings ==
Hvalsey is located on a narrow strip of land at the head of a fjord, with the church situated around 70 m (230 ft) from the water. The church is located in a classic Greenlandic Norse farmstead, with several additional adjacent buildings. The farmstead included a large building approximately 1,300 m^{2} (14,000 sq ft) in size. It had eleven rooms, combining living quarters, an 8 by 5 m (26 by 16 ft) banqueting hall and livestock pens. There were other livestock pens away from the main building, a horse enclosure for visitors to keep their horses, a storage building further up the hill and a warehouse at the edge of the water.

The dwelling was built on the top of an earlier building that dates back to the time of Erik the Red, and may have been Thorkell Farserk's home.

== Architecture ==
Around 16 by 8 m (52 by 26 ft), the church was constructed in the Anglo-Norwegian style of the early 13th century. The church held around 30–35 people, and was surrounded by a dyke marking the limits of the cemetery.

It was built from granite fieldstones. The stones are carefully laid and fitted. Some of the stones weigh between 4 and 5 tonnes, and some even more. Mortar was also used, but it is not known if it was used between the stones or only as plaster on the outside walls. The mortar was made from crushed shells so the church would have been white when built. Qaqortoq means "the white place", and the modern town of that name at the mouth of the fjord could have gotten its name by association with the church.

The walls are approximately 1.5 m (4 ft 11 in) thick. It is thought that it had a turf-covered wooden roof. All doors and windows are constructed using lintels, except for one window in the eastern gable, which had an arch. The window openings are wider on the inside, a detail not found in Icelandic churches, but well known in early churches in Britain which may have been the source of this building type.

Thanks to the good construction quality, Hvalsey Church has resisted the elements better than other Norse structures in Greenland. Nevertheless, it has partly collapsed, mainly because it was built over a graveyard. Graves were not removed before the construction and this caused the sinking of the foundation.

== Gallery ==
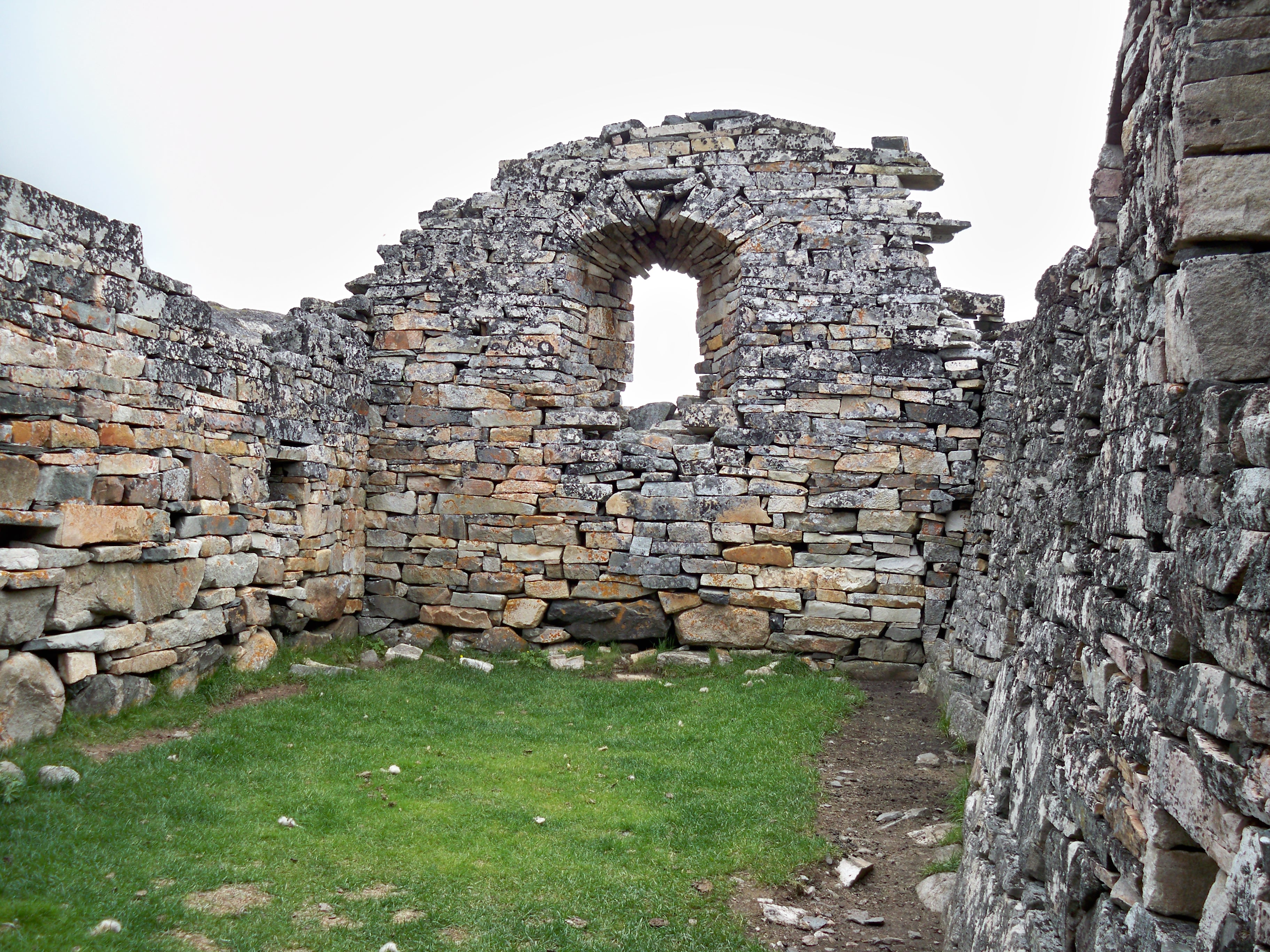
The church's arch window

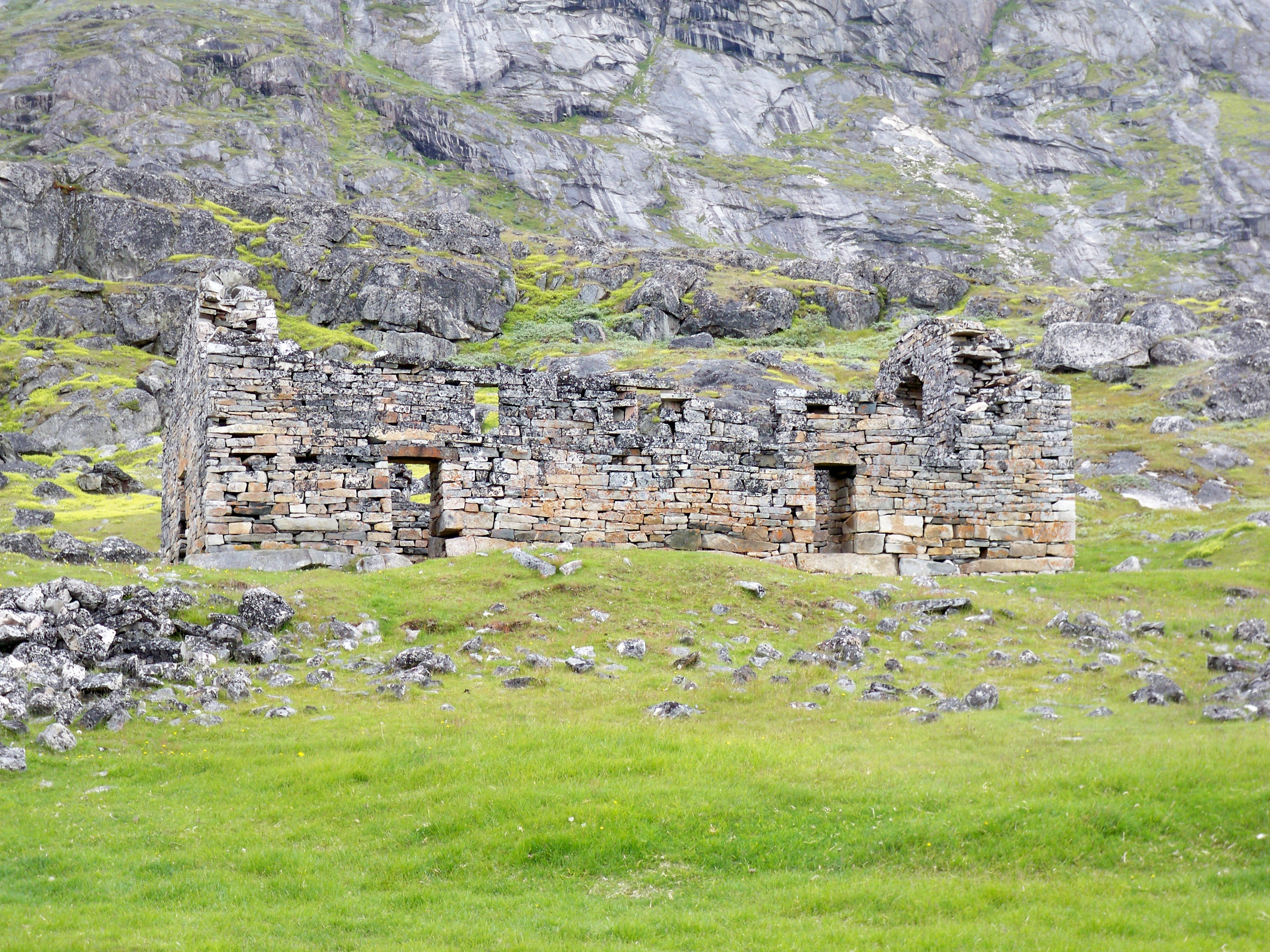
Southern aspect of the church

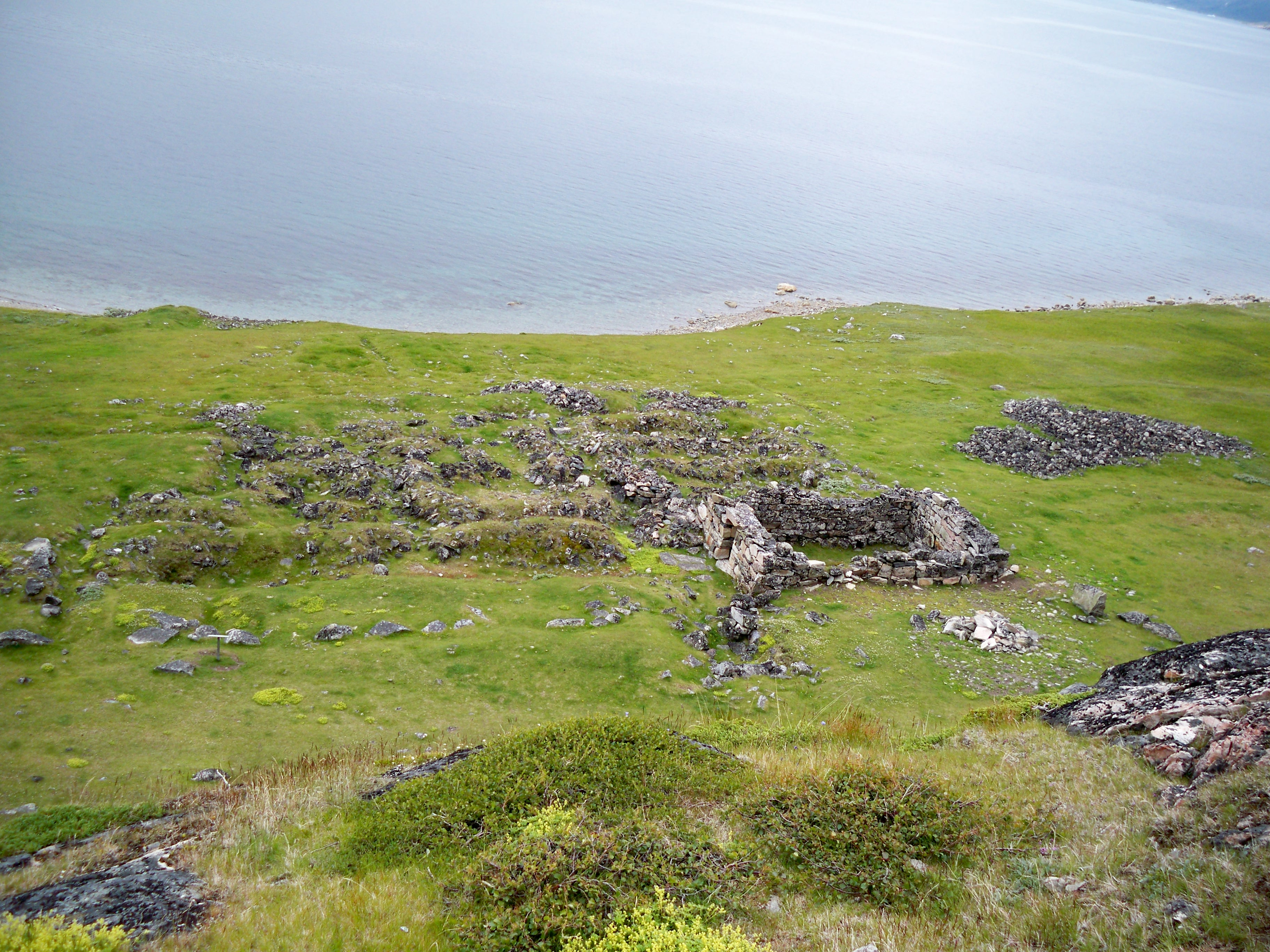
The Farmstead buildings

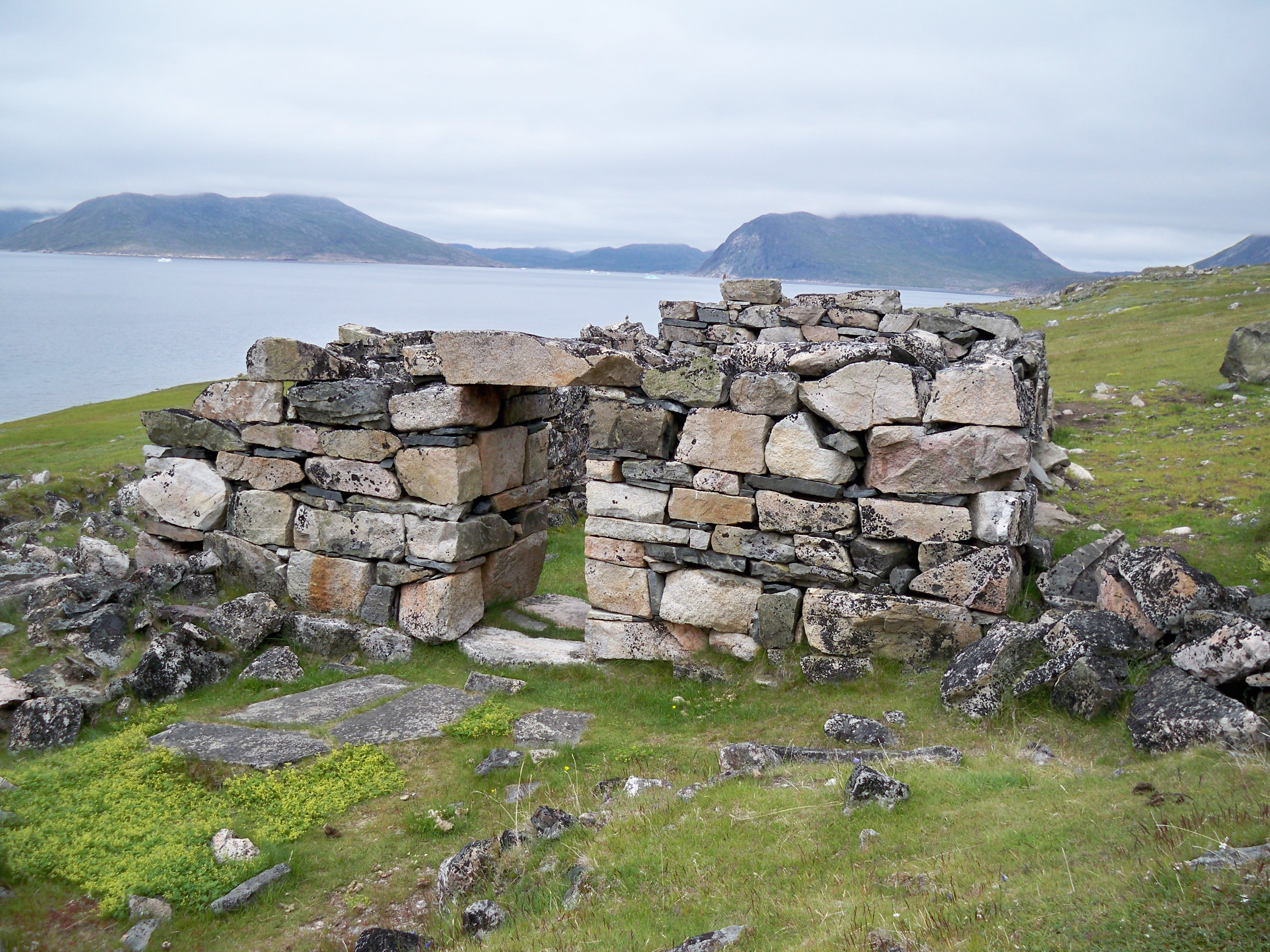
The banquet hall

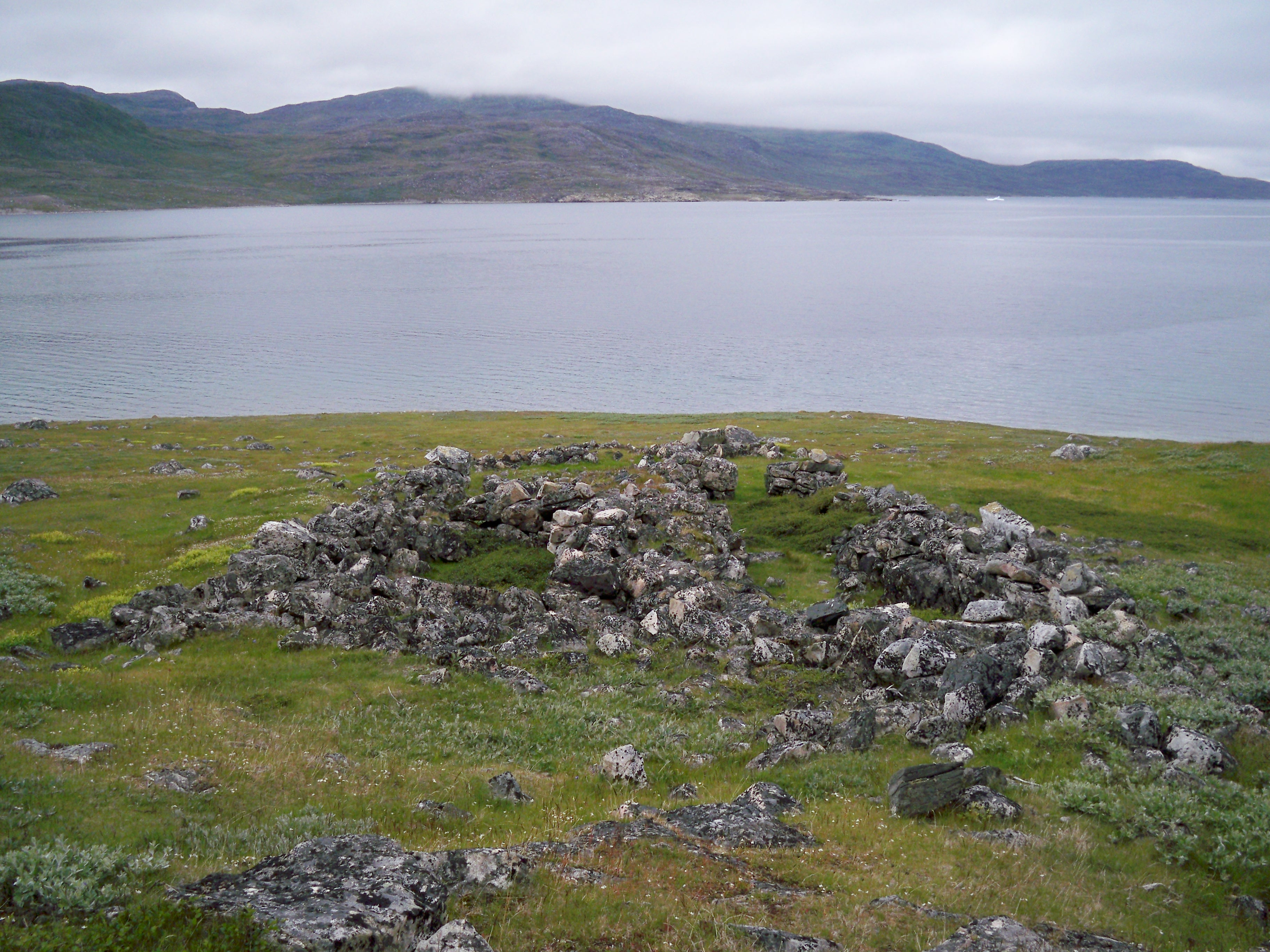
Nearby stables

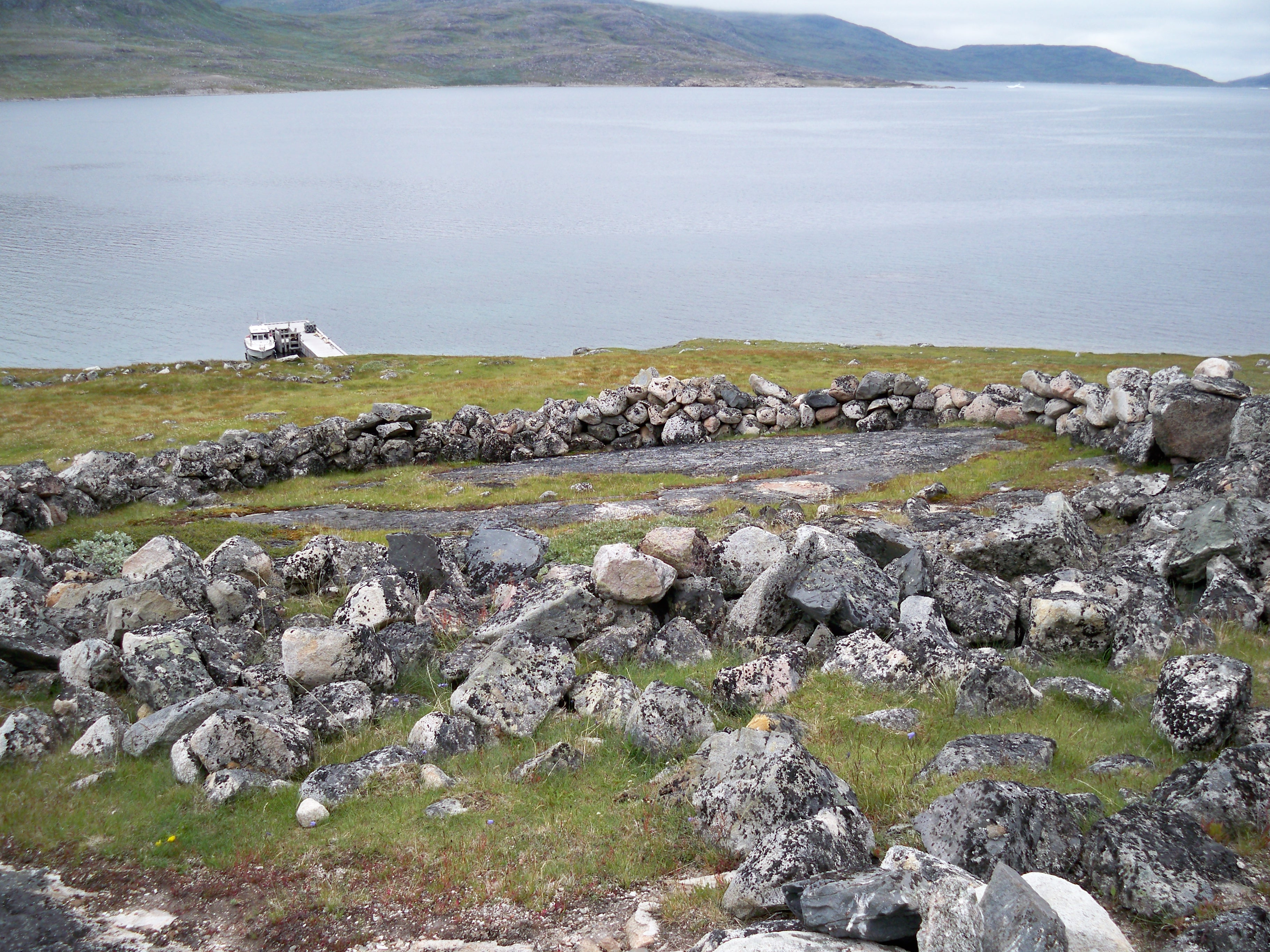
The horse pen

== See also ==
- Garðar Cathedral Ruins
- Greenlandic Norse people
- Norse colonization of North America
