= Frostastaðir =

Farm in Skagafjörður, Iceland

- Farm
- Interactive map of Frostastaðir
- Country: Iceland
- County: Skagafjörður (municipality)
- District: Blönduhlíð

Frostastaðir is a farm in the Blönduhlíð district in Skagafjörður, Iceland. It has been a large farm since early in Iceland's history and it was the county magistrate's residence for some time. The estate is mentioned in the Sturlunga saga and around 1332 it came under the ownership of bishop in Hólar.

The fire-and-brimstone preacher Jón Steingrímsson who was born in Þverá, the next town over, lived in Frostastaðir from 1754–1756. The sýslumaður and scholar Jón Espólín acquired the land in 1822 and lived there until he died in 1836. His grandson, Jón Espólín Hákonarson, went to Denmark and Sweden where he studied a number of subjects, including agriculture. When he returned home in 1852, he began running the farm in Frostastaðir and he took on students, which can be considered the genesis of agricultural instruction in Iceland, although this did not last long because Jón died in summer 1853.
