= Guðmundur Bergþórsson =

Icelandic poet (1657–1705)

Guðmundur Bergþórsson (1657–1705) was an Icelandic poet, and one of Iceland's most prolific composers of rímur.

== Biography ==
Knowledge of Guðmundur's biography arises largely from accounts by the nineteenth-century scholars Gísli Konráðsson and Bólu-Hjálmar. It appears that Guðmundur was born in Vatnsnes. As a four-year-old, Guðmundur acquired a disability that seriously affected his mobility. From the age of five he was fostered at Staðarbakki, until moving as a young to join his family on Snæfellsnes, where he spent the rest of his days. As well as composing poetry, Guðmundur taught children to write.

Guðmundur's poems included a catalogue of (male) heroes named Kappakvæði (composed around 1680), to which the later, female-centred poem Sprundahrós is thought to be a response, and a poem called Skautaljóð.

== Legacy ==
After his life, Guðmundur was the subject of various folktales, which often attributed both Christian piety and magical power to him, calling him an ákvæðaskáld or kraftaskáld (a poet whose words are so powerful they can have a magical effect).
