= Skagfirðingabók =

Icelandic local history publication since 1966

- Skagfirðingabók volumes 1–42
- Edited by: Kristmundur Bjarnason, Hannes Pétursson, and Sigurjón Björnsson
- Country: Iceland
- Language: Icelandic
- Discipline: History
- Publisher: Sögufélag Skagfirðinga
- No. of books: 42

Skagfirðingabók (Skagafjörður Book) is a publication about Skagafjörður, Iceland's local history published by Sögufélag Skagfirðinga, the Skagafjörður Historical Society. It was first published in 1966 and, as of 2023, consists of 42 volumes.

Skagfirðingabók's founders were Kristmundur Bjarnason of Sjávarborg, poet Hannes Pétursson, and professor Sigurjón Björnsson. The original name of Skagfirðingabók was Skagfirðingabók, Ársrit Sögufélags Skagfirðinga (Skagafjörður, the Skagafjörður Historical Society Yearbook) but, beginning with volume seven in 1975, the title became Skagfirðingabók, Rit Sögufélags Skagfirðinga (Skagafjörður Book, Edited by the Skagafjörður Historical Society).

Skagfirðingabók has only published historical materials, and has excluded poetry, regional news, and biographies of deceased individuals. An immense amount of material about Skagafjörður's sagas has appeared in the book as well. Skagfirðingabók was published in the same format until 2005—at which point, 30 volumes had been published—with lists of names in an index in every third volume. With the 31st volume in 2008, that part of the book was expanded slightly with more photos and a hardcover binding.

The Sögufélag Skagfirðinga website lists the articles that have appeared in the Skagfirðingabók.
