= Glóðafeykir =

Mountain in Skagafjörður, Iceland

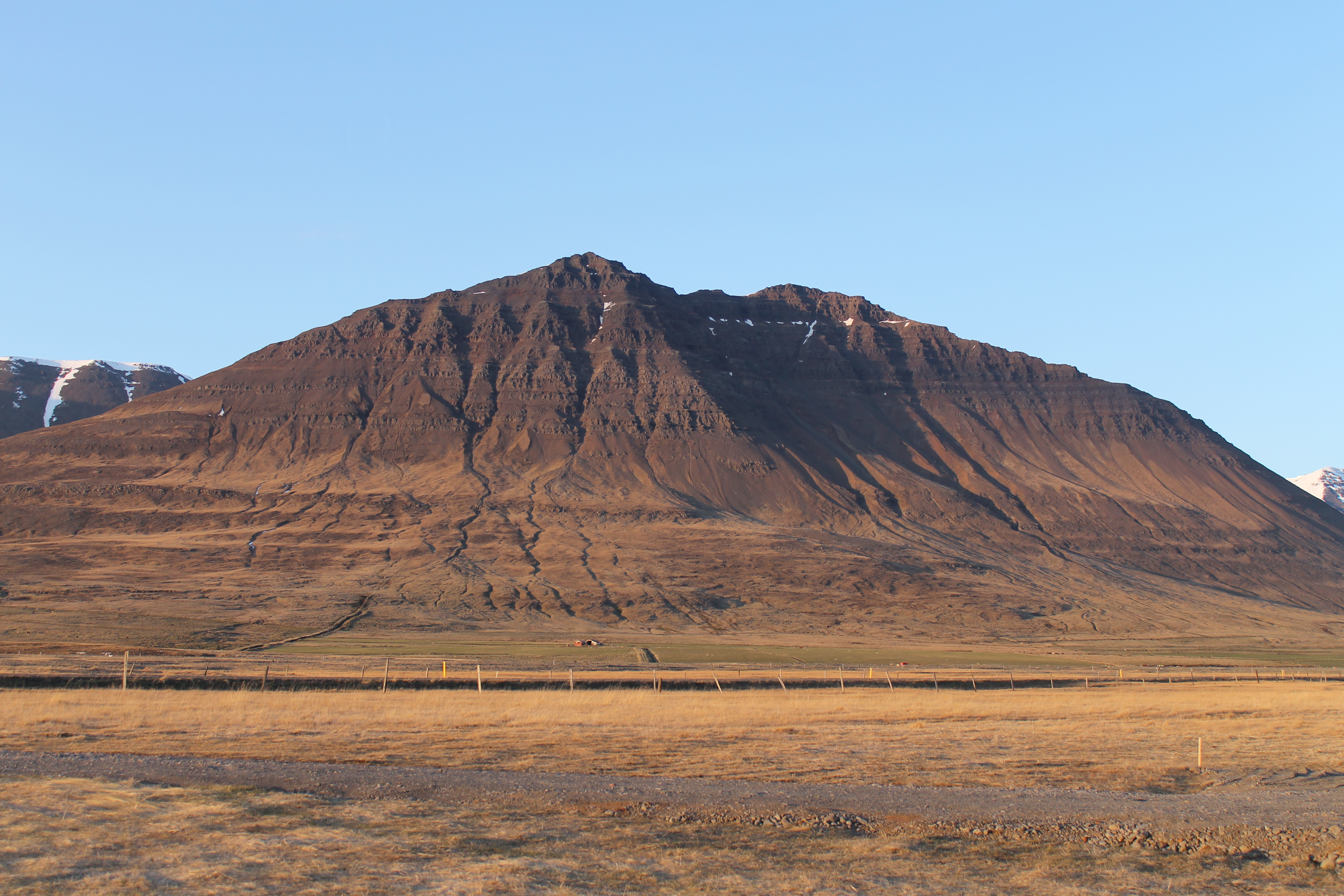
- Glóðafeykir

Highest point
- Elevation: 910 m (2,990 ft)
- Coordinates: 65°34′20″N 19°16′15″W

Naming
- Language of name: Icelandic

Geography
- Location: Skagafjörður, Iceland

Glóðafeykir is a mountain in eastern Skagafjörður, Iceland in the middle of the Blönduhlíð mountain range, directly opposite Varmahlíð. Its shape is gabled and it is rather striking. The mountain is rocky towards the top, but is still fairly easy to hike. Glóðafeykir, also often called Feykir or Feykirinn, is 910 meters tall.

Deep valleys run through the Tröllaskagi mountain range on both sides of Glóðafeykir: Flugumýrardalur valley to the north and Dalsdalur valley to the south. Two farms are located at the base of the mountain, Flugumýri to the north and Djúpidalur at the mouth of Dalsdalur. Sources say that, in the summer of 1551, Helga Sigurðardóttir, a mistress of Bishop Jón Arason, hid in a tent in the Húsgilsdrag hollow behind Glóðafeykir from soldiers that the Danish King had sent to Hólar.

The Glóðafeykir Youth Association (Ungmennafélagið Glóðafeykir), was named after the mountain and operated in Akrahreppur from the early 20th century until 1995. The local newspaper, Feykir, is also named after the mountain.
