= Frederick W. W. Howell =

British Icelandic explorer and photographer

- Born: Sutton Coldfield
- Died: July 3, 1901 (aged 44); Skagafjörður, Iceland

Frederick William Warbreck Howell (May 16, 1857 - July 3, 1901) was a British explorer, artist, and photographer known for his images of Iceland and the Faroe Islands towards the end of the nineteenth century.

== Early life and education ==
Howell was born in Queensferry, Flintshire to Edwin and Jane Howell and grew up in Sutton Coldfield, England. Not much is known about his earlier life. In 1885, he was the principal at Erdington College and had been described as a "schoolmaster." He was married to Elizabeth Annie Wright in 1880 and had three children.

== Career ==
Howell traveled to Iceland in 1890 and 1891 as a mountaineer and published a book of his drawings, Icelandic Pictures Drawn with Pen and Pencil, in 1893. In 1896 he published a book about mountain climbing titled To the Peak of the Öræfa Jökull. Howell was claimed to be the first man to ascend to the peak in 1891, though he was in the company of local guides Pall Jénsson and Thorlakur Thorlaksson. Howell had tried to ascend the peak the previous summer but had not been successful. He described the ascent as a "deeply religious experience," praising his Free Church Protestant God and downplaying the contributions and culture of his Icelandic companions.

He returned in 1900 with a camera and glass plates intending to explore and document the landscapes. His images were said to have shown Iceland and the Faroe Islands "on the edge of modernity", and documented locations "overlooked by most other travellers." Howell wrote a manuscript about his travels and submitted it for publication to the Royal Geographical Society, but it was rejected. He toured England giving lectures on his travels, illustrated with his own drawings and photographs. In 1899 he was said to have been the first person to cross the great glacial ridge at Lang Jokull.

Librarian Willard Fiske purchased over 400 photographic prints from Howell which he bequeathed to Cornell University upon his death in 1904. In 1923, the collection's first curator, Fiske's former assistant Halldór Hermannsson, assembled and mounted the images into six albums and added captions.

== Example works ==
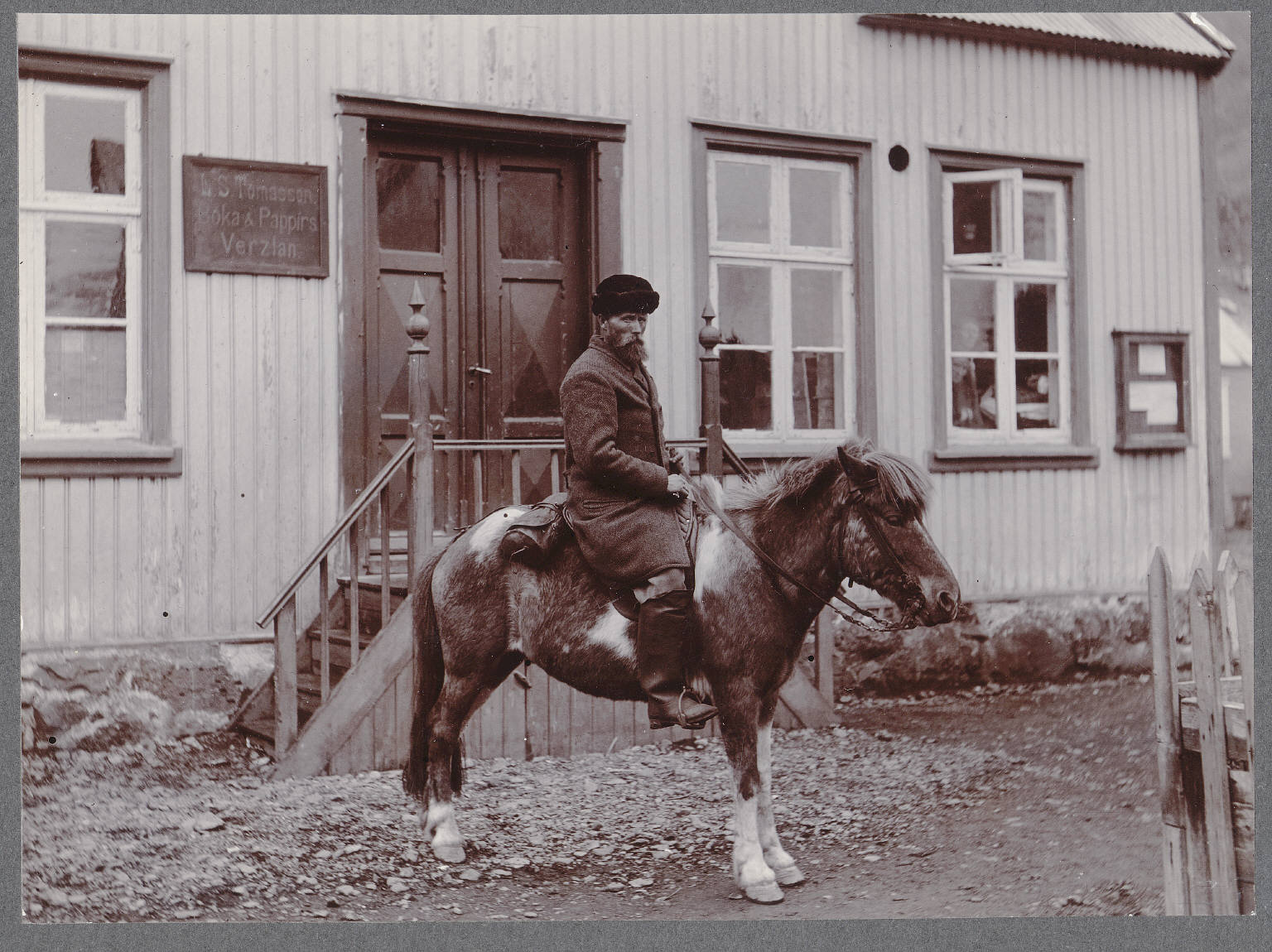
An Icelander and his steed in Seyðisfjörður

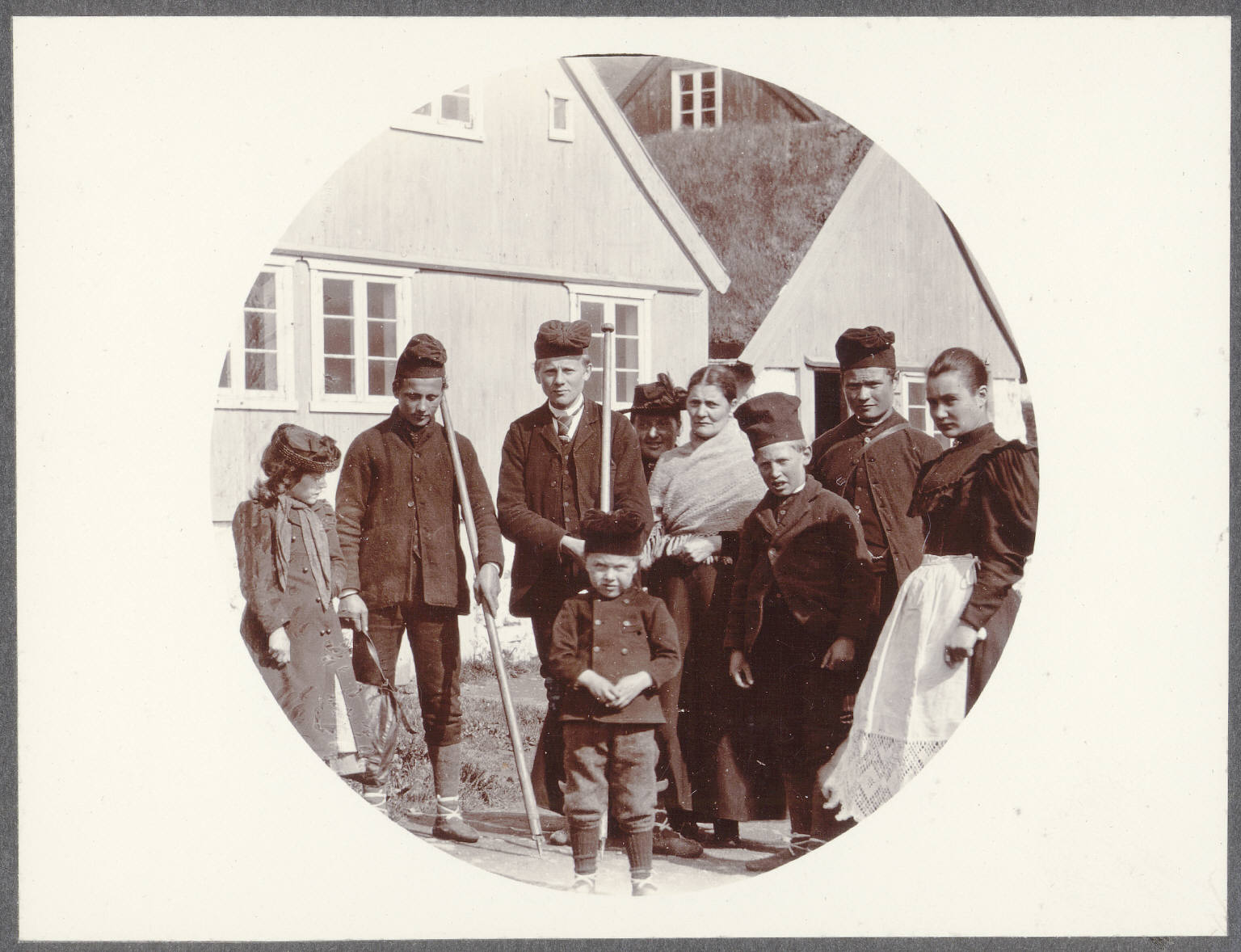
Group of Faroe people at Trangisvaag

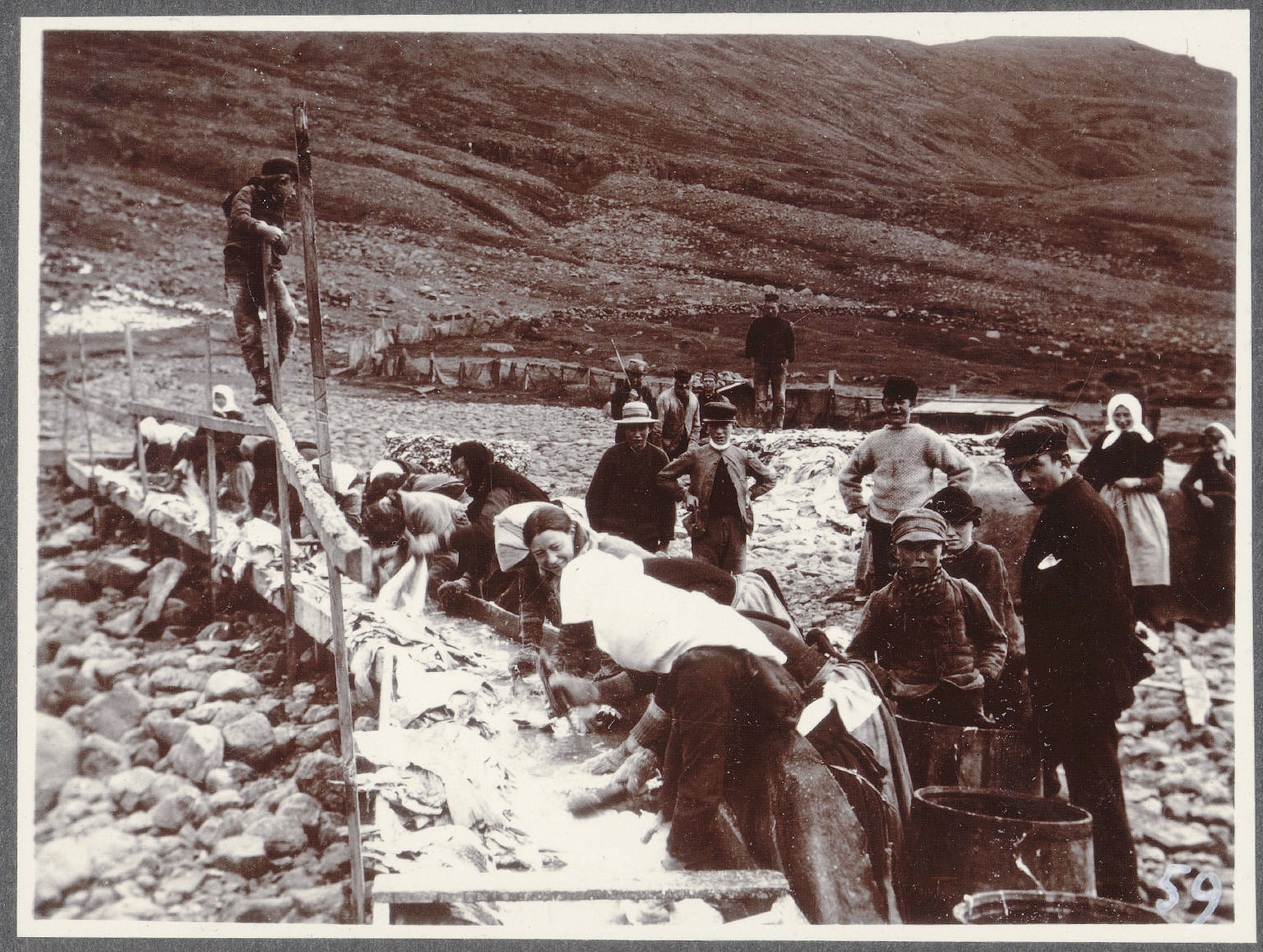
Fish washing in Eskifjörður

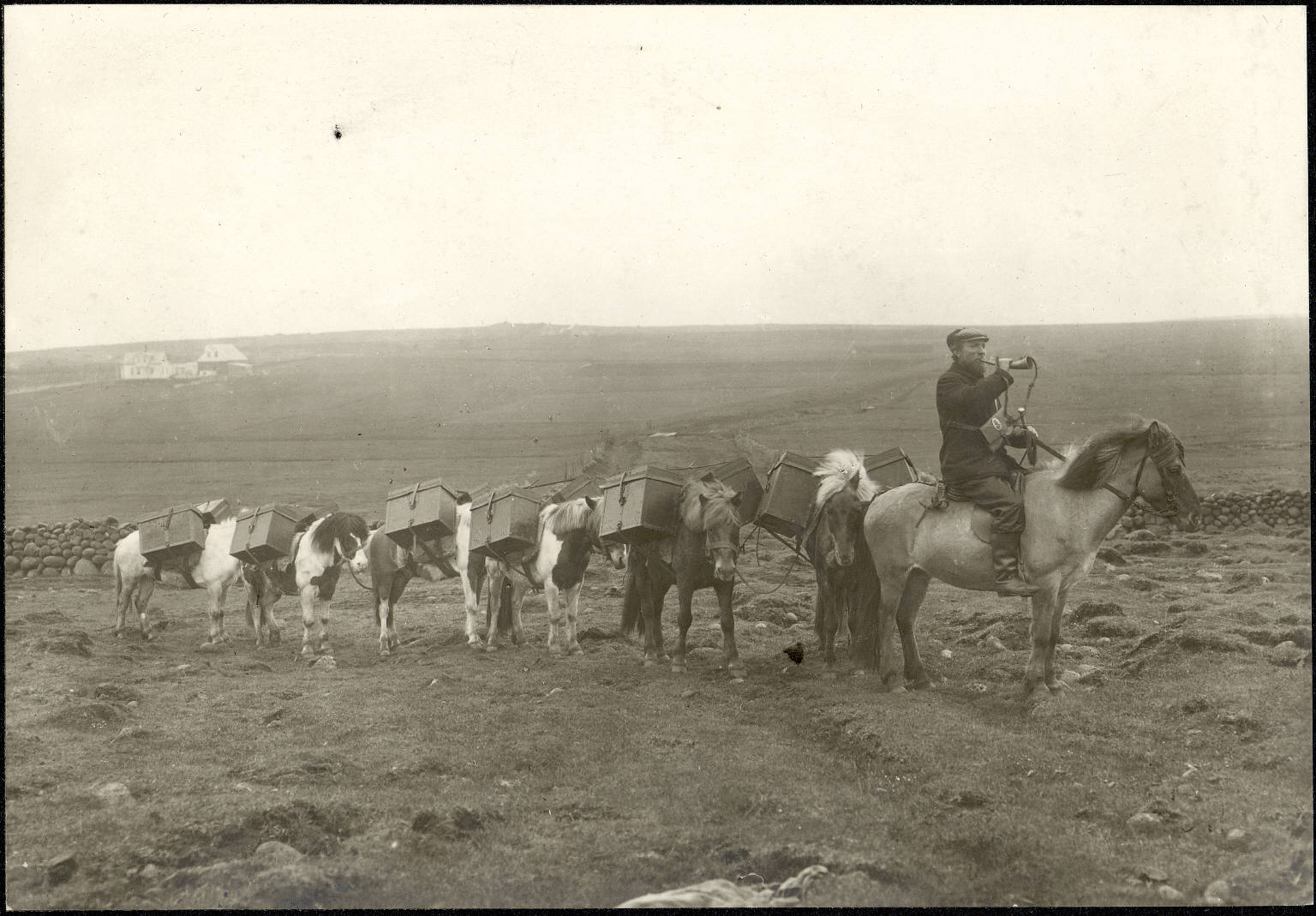
A mail train

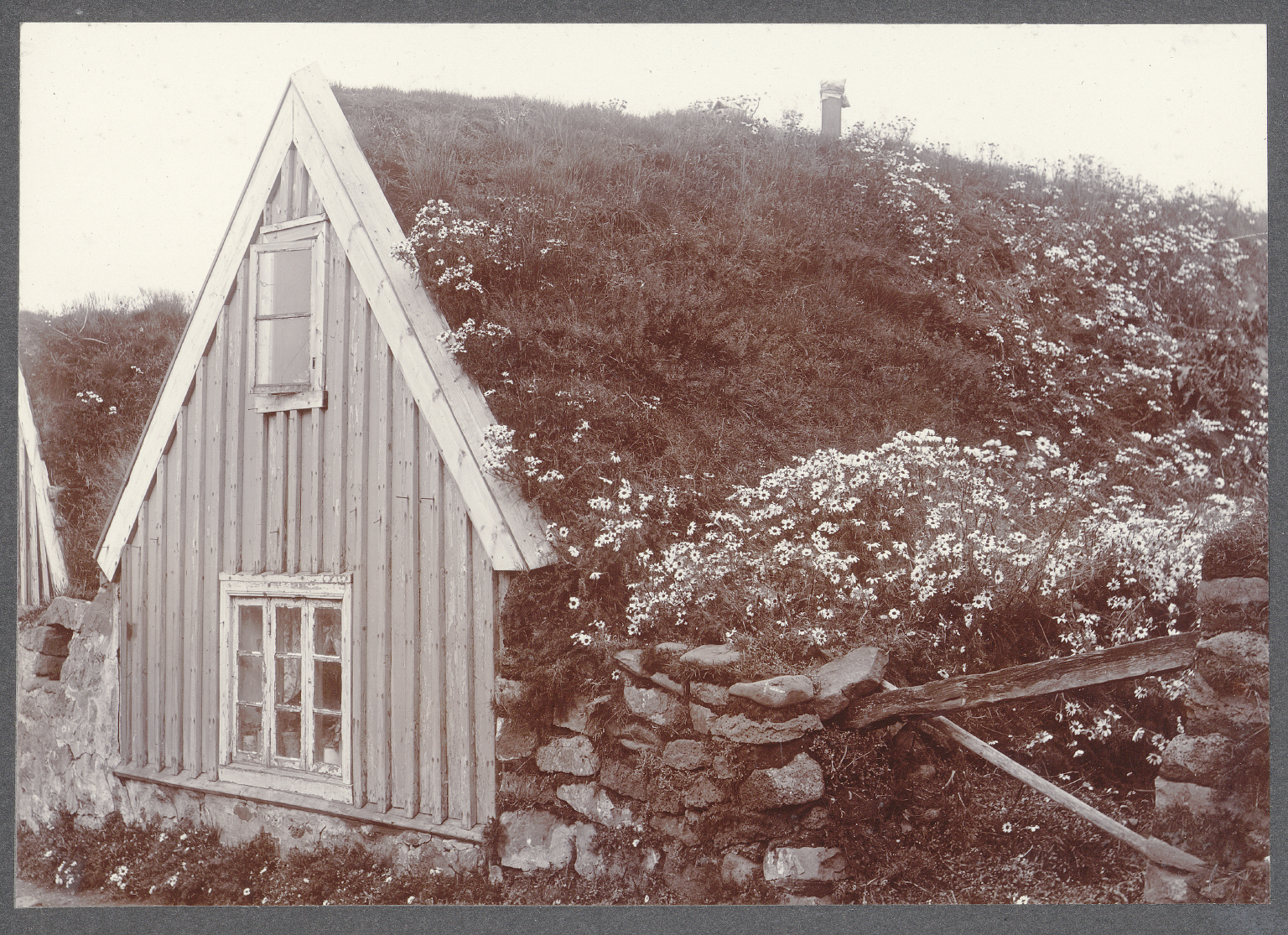
An older house covered in chamomile

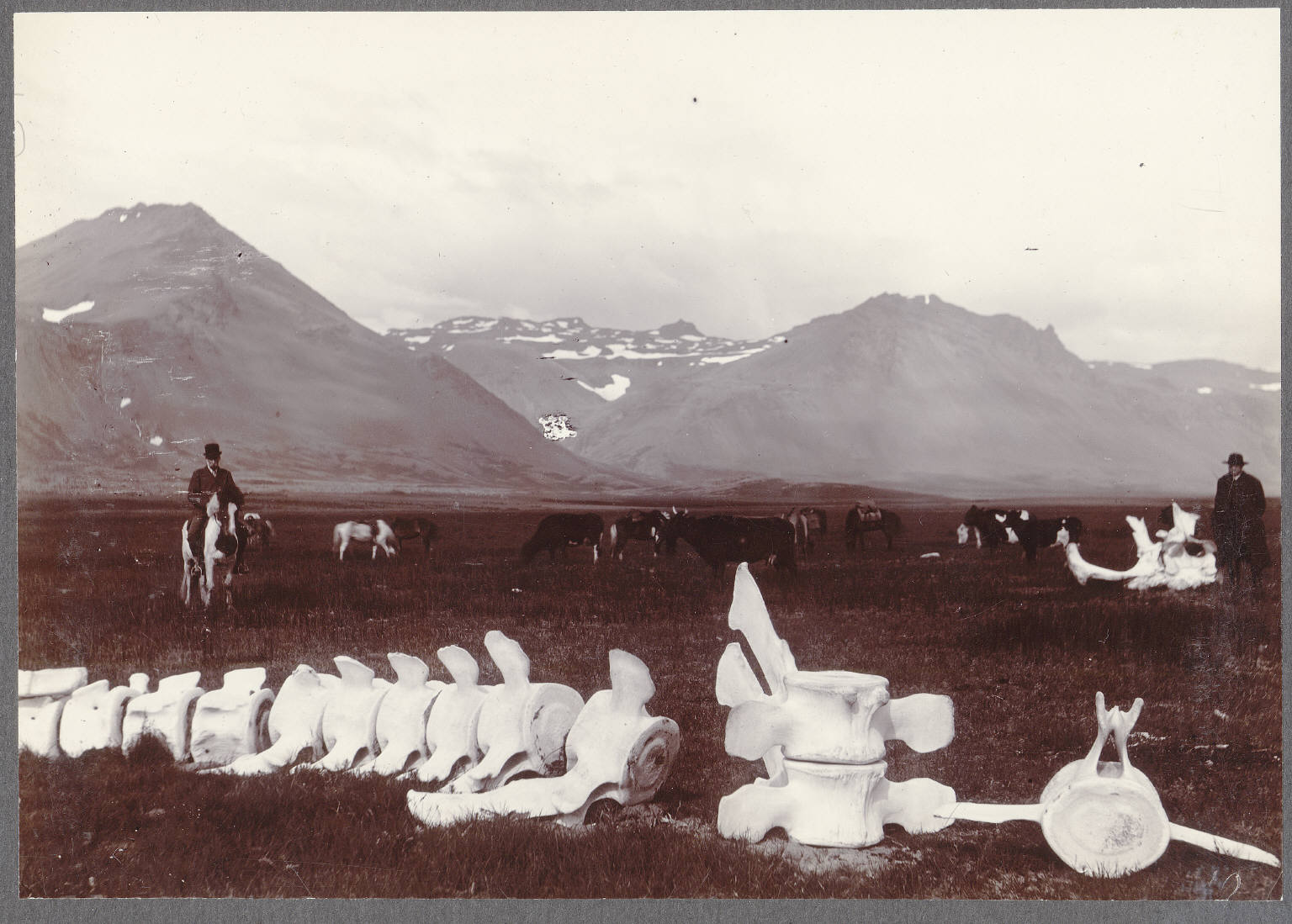
On the South Coast of Snæfellsnes

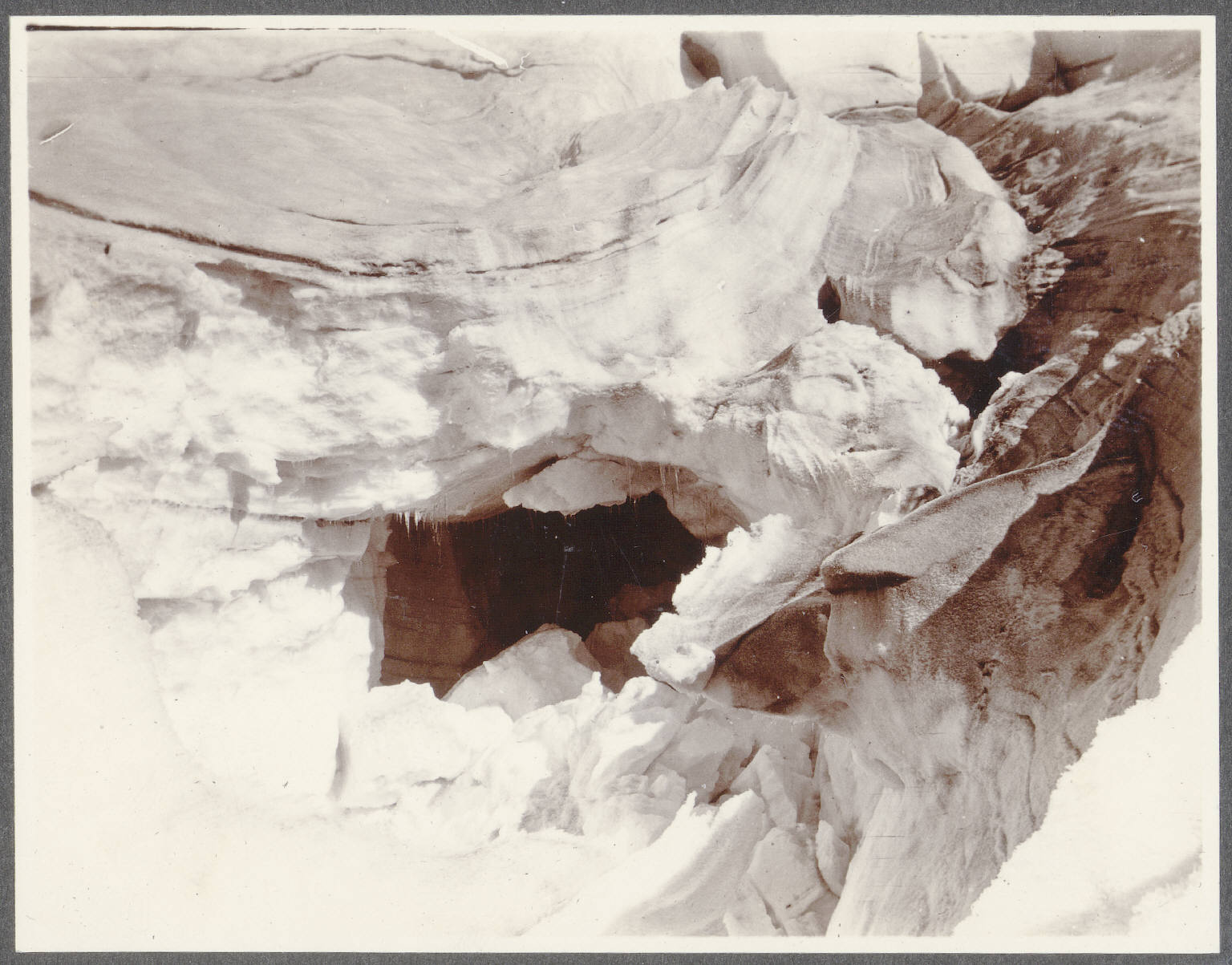
In the ice-fields, Öræfajökull

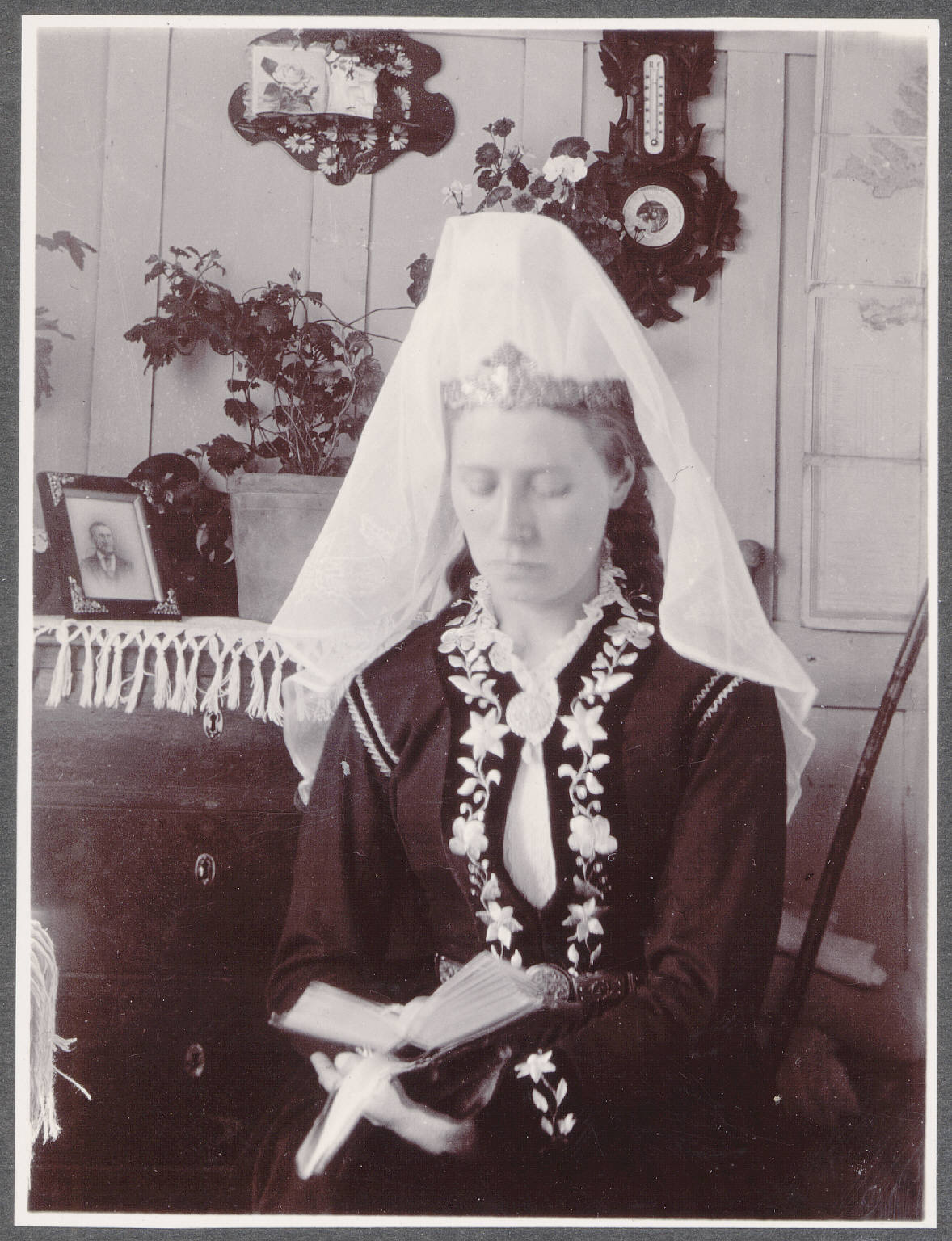
Steinunn Hjartardóttir

== Death and legacy ==
Howell drowned in the Héraðsvötn River in July 1901. He was buried in Miklibær, Skagafjörður. His photography was chosen to be in a touring exhibition in 1982 entitled The Frozen image: Scandinavian photography arranged by Martin L. Friedman. In 2004 Frank Ponzi published a book of Howell's photographs with annotations, called Howell's Iceland. In 2005 his great-granddaughter, Judith Corney recreated some of his Icelandic travels.
