= Sprundahrós =

Sprundahrós is a twenty-two-stanza Icelandic poem in the vikivakakvæði form composed probably by Jón Jónsson of Kvíabekkur (1739–1785).

== Themes and contents ==
The poem lists twenty-five women thought to be exemplary, including figures from the Bible, Icelandic sagas, and European queens. It survives in three manuscripts, all from the nineteenth century: Reykjavík, National and University Library of Iceland, ÍB 815 8vo, JS 255 4to, and JS 589 4to. According to Natalie M. Van Deusen, the poem is probably a response to the male-centred Kappakvæði composed in around 1680 by Guðmundur Bergþórsson (c. 1657–1705).
