= Flugumýri =

Town in Skagafjörður, Iceland

Coordinates: 65°34′38″N 19°19′27″W

- Town
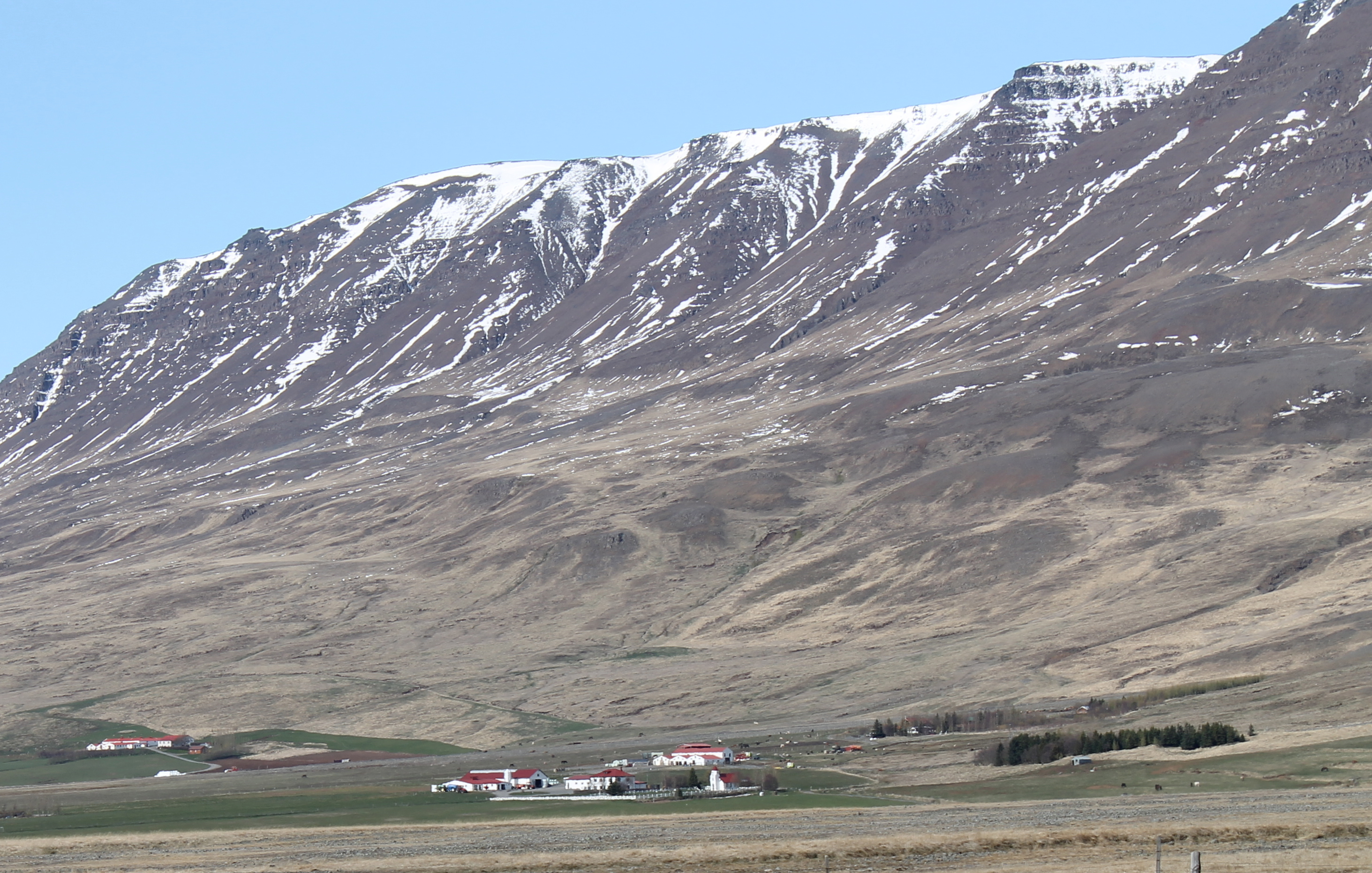
- Flugumýri
- Interactive map of Flugumýri
- Country: Iceland
- County: Skagafjörður (municipality)
- District: Blönduhlíð
- Founded by: Þóris dúfunefs
- Named after: The horse Flugu

Flugumýri is a town and church site in the Blönduhlíð district of Skagafjörður, Iceland, at the base of Glóðafeykir mountain. It was, and is, a manorial estate. The town was the homestead of Þórir dúfunef (the dove-nosed) and, according to the Landnámabók, it was named for the mare Fluga, a quality horse that Þórir owned.

== History ==
Flugumýri has, as a rule, been home to a large farm and various chieftains have lived there. During the Age of the Sturlungs, Flugumýri was one of the Ásbirningar family clan's estates, and Kolbeinn ungi ("the young") Arnórsson lived there from 1233 until he died in 1245. His widow gave the land to the Hólar diocese, but Gissur Þorvaldsson bought it from them, settled there in spring 1253, and built a large farm there. He got good use out of it, albeit not for long because on October 22, after the wedding feast for Gissur and Ingibjörg Sturludóttir's son Hallur, Gissur's enemies arrived in Flugumýri and tried to lock him inside the farm and burn it down. This event, known as the Flugumýri arson, is the most well known in Flugumýri's history.

In 1360, the Hólar diocese reacquired the land when Bishop Jón skalli ("the bald") Eiríksson bought it, and the diocese owned the land until the turn of the 19th century when the farms were sold. In centuries past, the Hólar diocese's priests typically held their annual meetings in Flugumýri.

The town was a medical center in the early 19th century, when the region's doctor, Ari Arason, lived there. The Skagafjörður Women's School (Kvennaskóli Skagfirðinga) was in Flugumýri from 1880 to 1882, before it was closed down. The school had previously been in Hjaltastaðir from 1878 to 1880 and, before that, was in Ási in Hegranes in 1877, where it was founded.

Now there is a large horse farm in Flugumýri and a tourist services operate out of the town.

== Geography ==
Virkishóll hill overlooks the town of Flugumýri, abutting Glóðafeykir mountain, and there are ruins that may have been part of fortifications, possibly from the Age of the Sturlungs. The artifacts are protected. Two valleys run along the mountain: Flugumýrardalur to the south and Hvammsdalur to the west. The river that runs through it is called Hvammsá but it used to be named Glóðafeykisá. The side valley Ranghali splits off from the main valley to the northeast, and an old hiking trail goes through it over to Hjaltadalur.

== Flugumýri church ==
There has been a church in Flugumýri for centuries and it is first mentioned in the Sturlunga saga in relation to the Flugumýri arson. Gissur Þorvaldsson's on Hallur was carried into the church, where he died from fatal wounds. Gissur himself was also brought into the church after he emerged from his hiding place in the skyr-curdling barrel. The Flugumýri church was dedicated to the Apostle Peter.

The current church was built during 1929 and 1930. It is served by priests from Miklibær.
