= Bóla =

Abandoned farm in Skagafjörður, Iceland

Bóla Bólstaðargerði
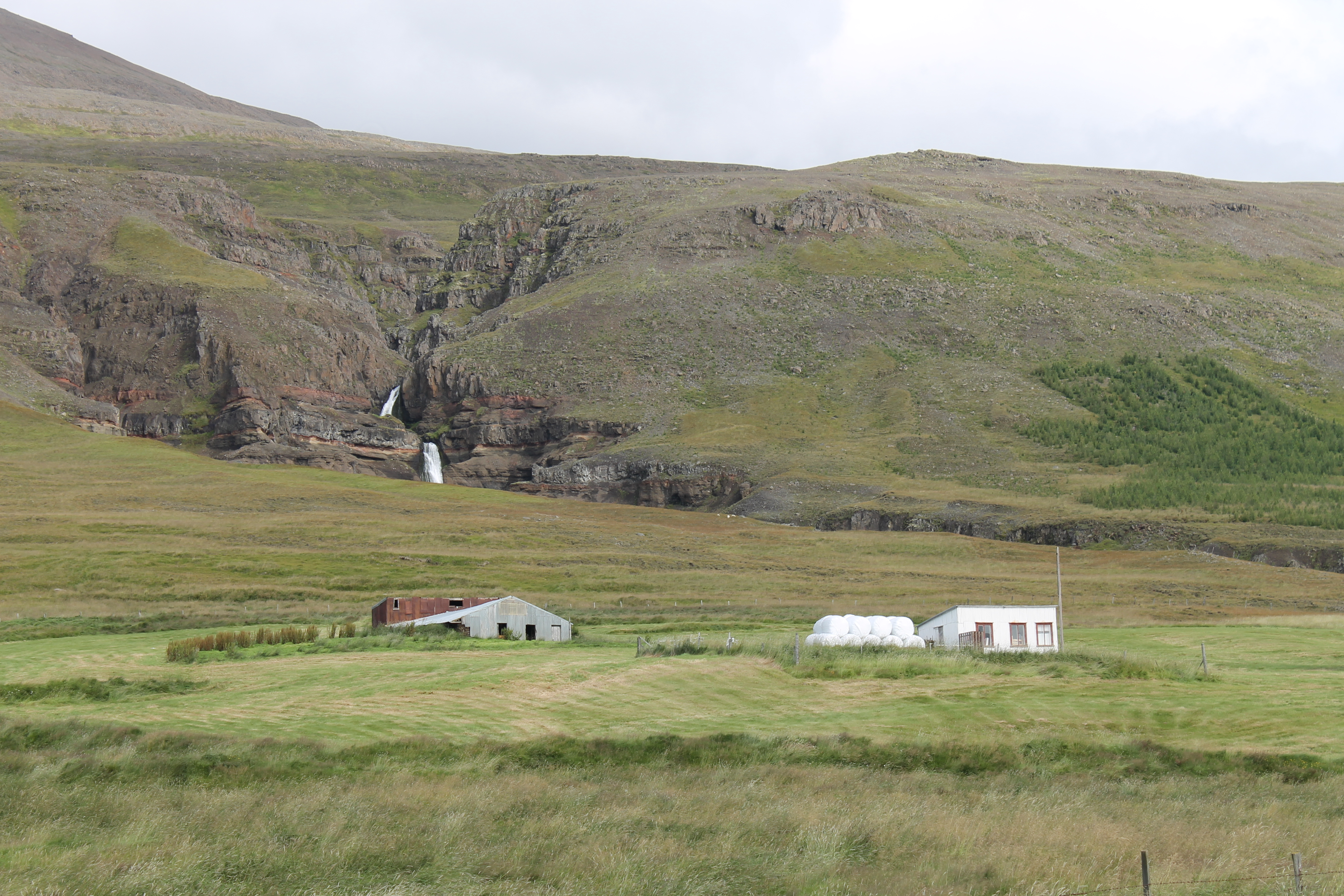
- Interactive map of Bóla
- Coordinates: 65.45111°N 19.20656°W
- Country: Iceland
- Country: Skagafjörður (municipality)
- District: Blönduhlíð
- Founder: Hjálmar Jónsson
- Named for: Bólu-Hjálmar (Hjálmar Jónsson)

Bóla is an abandoned farm in Blönduhlíð in Skagafjörður, Iceland that was a smallholding from Uppsala previously named Bólstaðargerði. It was abandoned for most of the 18th century and up until 1833, when the poet Hjálmar Jónsson lived on the farm, which he first called Bólugerði, but later named Bóla, which it was called from then on. The river Bóluá flows a short distance from the farm and creates seven waterfalls down a massive gorge, Bólugil. According to folklore, the troll woman Bóla lived there.

Bóla is best known for being the residence of Bólu-Hjálmar who lived there from 1833–1843, but his residency there ended after he was suspected of theft. Hjálmar’s memorial was erected in Bóla in 1955. The farm has been abandoned since 1976.

== Notes ==
This is not a reference to Uppsala in Sweden, but a place in Iceland that, at one time, was called Uppsala.
