= Lǫgréttumaðr =

Medieval period juror in Norway

Lǫgréttumaðr (Old Norse; Icelandic: lögréttumaður, pl. lögréttumenn; Danish: lagrettemann or Danish: lagrettemedlem; in Shetland and Orkney lawrikman or lawrightman) was an official role in the medieval kingdom of Norway. Functioning like a jury, their main role was to decide and vote on questions of guilt in criminal cases in their local district courts (Norwegian: bygdeting).

== Lögréttumenn in Iceland ==
The office of lögréttumaður existed in Icelandic society from the end of the Icelandic Commonwealth around 1262 until the abolition of the Alþingi in 1800.

A legislature (Icelandic: lögrétta) had existed in Iceland since the foundation of Alþingi, and the goðar and their advisers had places in it, but when Icelanders came under the rule of the King of Norway, the role of the Legislature changed: it continued to have a limited legislative power, but was primarily a court. The goðar were replaced by lögréttumenn. 36 people sat in the legal court at any time, three from each þing, and they were chosen from a group of 84 nominees, farmers who were nominated by the sýslumenn. Lögréttumenn were traditionally chosen from the ranks of the higher-class farmers in each hérað ('district').

== Sources ==
- Norsk historisk leksikon. 2nd edn, 3rd printing (2004).
