= Thorkell Farserk =

Relative and shipmate of Erik the Red

Thorkell Farserk (Þorkell Farserkur) was a shipmate and relative of Erik the Red. He settled Hvalsey, Greenland, where he started a farmstead.

According to the medieval Icelandic Landnámabók (Book of Settlements), Farserk was very strong. He once swam to Hvalsey for an ox, bringing it back on his back to entertain Erik the Red. He was interred in Hvalsey which his ghost has haunted ever since.
