= Víðivellir =

Farm in Skagafjörður, Iceland

Coordinates: 65.4999°N 19.2937°W

- Farm
- Interactive map of Víðivellir
- Country: Iceland
- Country: Skagafjörður (municipality)
- District: Blönduhlíð

Víðivellir is a farm in the Blönduhlíð district of Skagafjörður, Iceland, and an old manor house that chieftains often lived in, like some of Skagafjörður county's sýslumaðurs.

There was as church in Víðivellir early in the settlement of Iceland, but it was decommissioned in 1765. There was a little geothermal heat in two places in the estate's land. Between 1937 and 1938, a swimming pool was built there. It was used for swim lessons until shortly after 1960, when it was used just for swimming, not for lessons.

The abandoned farm Örlygsstaðir is on the land of Víðivellir. On August 21, 1238, the Battle of Örlygsstaðir took place, where nearly 3,000 people fought. A memorial to the battle was unveiled on August 21, 1988, 750 years after the battle was fought.

Skagafjörður's last execution took place in Víðivellir in 1789. A woman named Ingibjörg from Fljót who had given birth to a baby the previous summer, was executed for secretly killing and burying the baby.

From 1809 to 1842, the dean Péter Pétursson lived there with his wife Þóra Brynjólfsdóttir. Víðivellir is where they raised their sons: high court judge Jón Pétursson, bishop Pétur Pétursson, and Brynjólfur Pétursson who edited the literary journal Fjölnir and was, for a time, a director of the Icelandic bureau in Copenhagen. They were often called the "Víðivellir Brothers" (Víðivallabræður). A memorial to the brothers was erected a short way from the farm in 1998.

In a visit to Iceland in summer 1936, King Christian X stopped in Víðivellir along with his entourage and ate lunch in a tent in the Víðivellir farm's field.
