= Hvalsey =

Archaeological site in Greenland

- Qaqortukulooq
- Location of Hvalsey in Greenland
- 60°49′43″N 45°46′58″W
- Associated with: Norsemen
- Location: Close to Qaqortoq, Greenland
- Region: Greenland

UNESCO World Heritage Site
- Part of: Kujataa Greenland: Norse and Inuit Farming at the Edge of the Ice Cap
- Criteria: Cultural: v
- Reference: 1536-005
- Inscription: 2017 (41st Session)

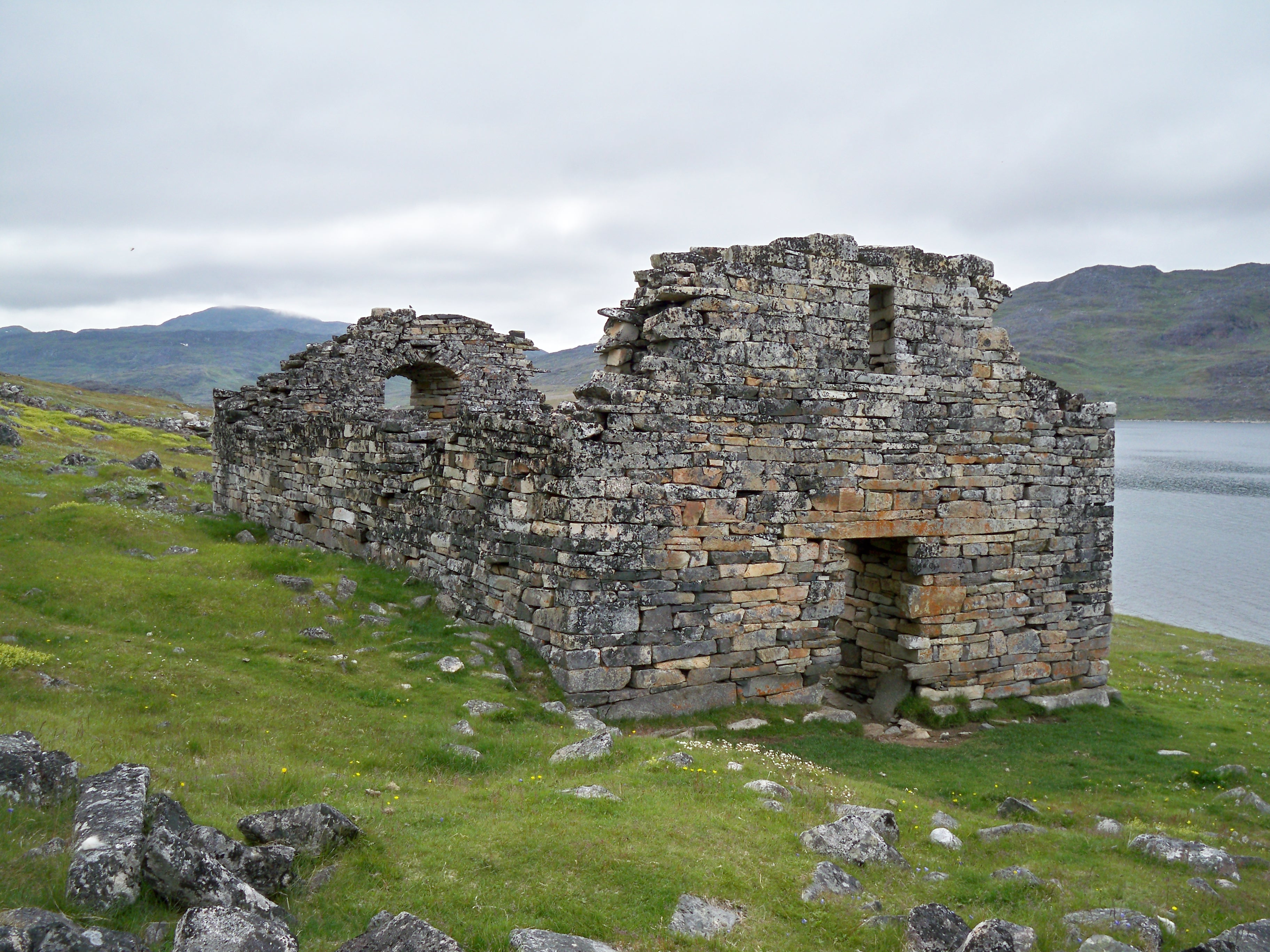
Hvalsey Church

Hvalseyjarfjord ("Whale Island fjord"; Greenlandic Qaqortukulooq) is located at the back of Qaqortoq, Greenland and is the site of Greenland's largest, best-preserved Norse ruins in the area known as the Eastern Settlement (Eystribyggð). In 2017, it was inscribed on the UNESCO World Heritage List and part of the Kujataa Greenland site.

== History ==
According to the Icelandic Book of Settlements (Landnámabók), the farmstead was established by Erik the Red's uncle, Þorkell Farserkur (Thorkell Farserk) in the late 10th century.

The farmstead was known as Þjóðhildarstaðir (Thjódhildsstead) by the time of Ivar Bardarson's report of ca 1360/64. In the 14th century, it belonged to the Kings of Norway:

Næst Einarsfirði liggr Hvalseyjarfjörðr. Þar er kirkja, sem heitir Hvalseyjarfjarðarkirkja. Hún á allan fjörðinn ok svá allan Kambstaðafjörð, sem er næstr. Í þessum firði stendur bær mikill, sem konungi tilheyrir og heitir Þjóðhildarstaðir.

Beside Einar's Firth lies Hvalsey Fjord. There is a church there called Hvalsey Fjord Church. It serves the entire fjord and all of Kambstad Fjord as well, which is beside it. On this firth stands a large farmstead, which belongs to the king and is called Thjodhild's Stead.

The farmstead was a major center in South Greenland. The site, which has the ruins of two stone great halls, had an additional 14 houses close to a churchhouse. The old hall, which is 14 metres (46 ft) long and 3 metres (9.8 ft) or 4 metres (13 ft) wide, is in the middle of the ruins. The well-preserved newer hall measures 8 metres (26 ft) by 5 metres (16 ft).

== Church ==
The church house, which was first erected in the early 12th century, might have been built by Scots-Norse stonemasons as similar structures are found in Norway and Orkney. The church might have been maintained due to the site's royal ownership.

The church house was exceptionally well built from carefully chosen stones that in some cases weigh in excess of five tons. Its walls, which are up to 1.5 metres (4 ft 11 in) thick, measure 16 metres (52 ft) by 8 metres (26 ft) on the outside. The gables rise 5 metres (16 ft) to 6 metres (20 ft) from the floor and may have risen 2m higher when first constructed. Side walls, which would have been higher when new, now stand 4 metres (13 ft). The building was plastered with ground mussel shells and would have been white when in use and was roofed with timber and turf.

A 1408 wedding at the site's church is the last documented event to occur during the Norse settlement of Greenland. Two years later the Icelandic newlyweds, ship's captain Þorsteinn Ólafsson and Sigríður Björnsdóttir, returned to Norway, before sailing to Iceland and settling on the bride's family farm at Akrar, north Iceland, in 1413. The details were recorded in letters between papal dignitaries in Iceland and the Vatican.

Archaeological evidence shows that over the next hundred years the last Norse settlements in Greenland slowly died out. It was not until 1721 that a joint merchant-clerical expedition led by Danish-Norwegian missionary Hans Egede discovered that the Norse colonies in Southern Greenland had disappeared.

== Folklore ==
In the Greenlandic Inuit oral tradition, there is a legend about why the Norse population of Hvalsey died out and why their houses and churches are in ruins. According to the legend, the reason was a feud between a local Norse chieftain named Ungortoq and a young but determined Inuit warrior named K'aissape. In revenge for Ungortoq's slaying of his younger brother, Inuit warriors under K'aissape approached Hvalsey by sea in kayaks disguised as an iceberg and then burned down the Norse settlers inside their houses. Ungortoq escaped the massacre with his family, but K'aissape finally hunted down and slew Ungortoq and his whole family in a Norse farmstead near Cape Farewell.
