= Miklibær =

Church site and parsonage in Blönduhlíð in Skagafjörður, Iceland

Coordinates: 65°30′34″N 19°17′44″W

Miklibær í Blönduhlíð Miklibær
- Church site
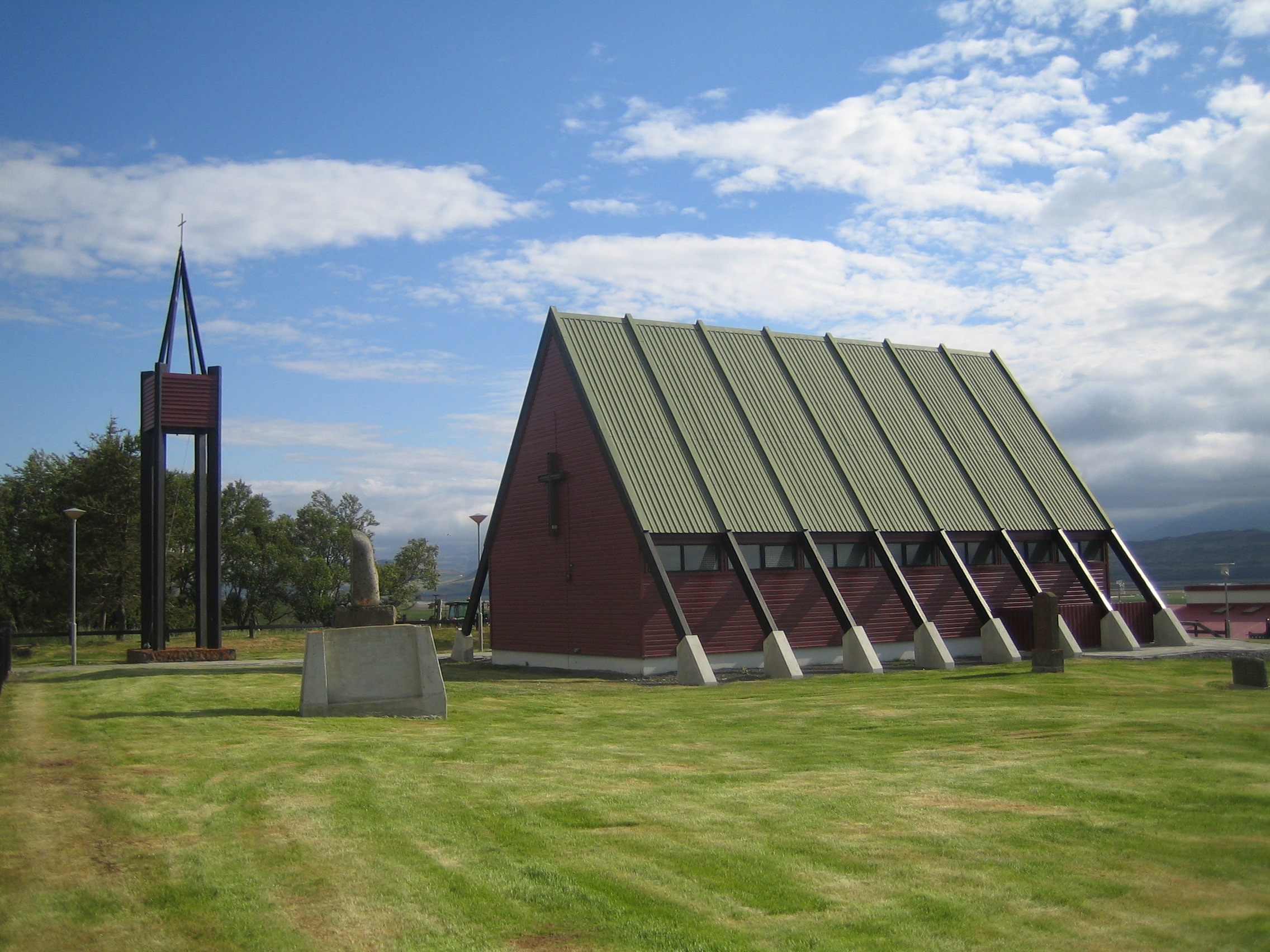
- The church in Miklibær
- Country: Iceland
- County: Skagafjörður

Miklibær is a church site and parsonage in Blönduhlíð in Skagafjörður, Iceland. The oldest source for the church in Miklibær is from the year 1234 in the Sturlunga Saga, which says from that point on, Kolbeinn ungi (“the young”) Arnórsson had the town because he killed Kálfur Guttormsson and his son Guttormur.

Miklibær played a considerable role in the Age of the Sturlungs, especially in the Battle of Örlygsstaðir. Sturla Sighvatsson stayed there with part of his squad the night before the battle, and his brothers, Kolbeinn and Þórður, fled to Miklibær and sought sanctuary in the church. Ultimately, they were forced out and captured. Their heads were cut off, as were many others'.

The most famous priest to have been at Miklibær is Oddur Gíslason (1740–1786), who became a priest there in 1768. He got a housekeeper named Solveig and she fell in love with him, but it was unrequited. After he married another woman in 1777, Solveig developed a mental illness and tried to commit suicide. She eventually succeeded in taking her own life by slitting her throat on April 11, 1778. She was buried outside the church yard like others who had killed themselves. It was said that she became a ghost. Some years later, on October 1, 1786, Reverend Oddur went to mass in Silfrastaðir but he never returned from the trip. Many folktales formed around Oddur's disappearance, and it was said that Solveig had dragged him and his horse into her grave. In reality, his horse was found the next morning and, in a letter written in 1789, it came to light that Reverend Oddur had been found there around springtime in Gegnir stream below the town.

The plans for the present church in Milklibær, which was built in 1973 after the former church burned down, were drawn up by the master builder Jörundur Pálsson. The grave of Hjálmar Jónsson, as well as his wife Guðný, is located in Miklibær's grave yard.

Gottskálk Þorvaldsson (1741–1806), father of the sculptor Bertel Thorvaldsen, was the son of a priest from Miklibær.
