= Silfrastaðir =

Farm and church site in Skagafjörður, Iceland

- Farm and church site
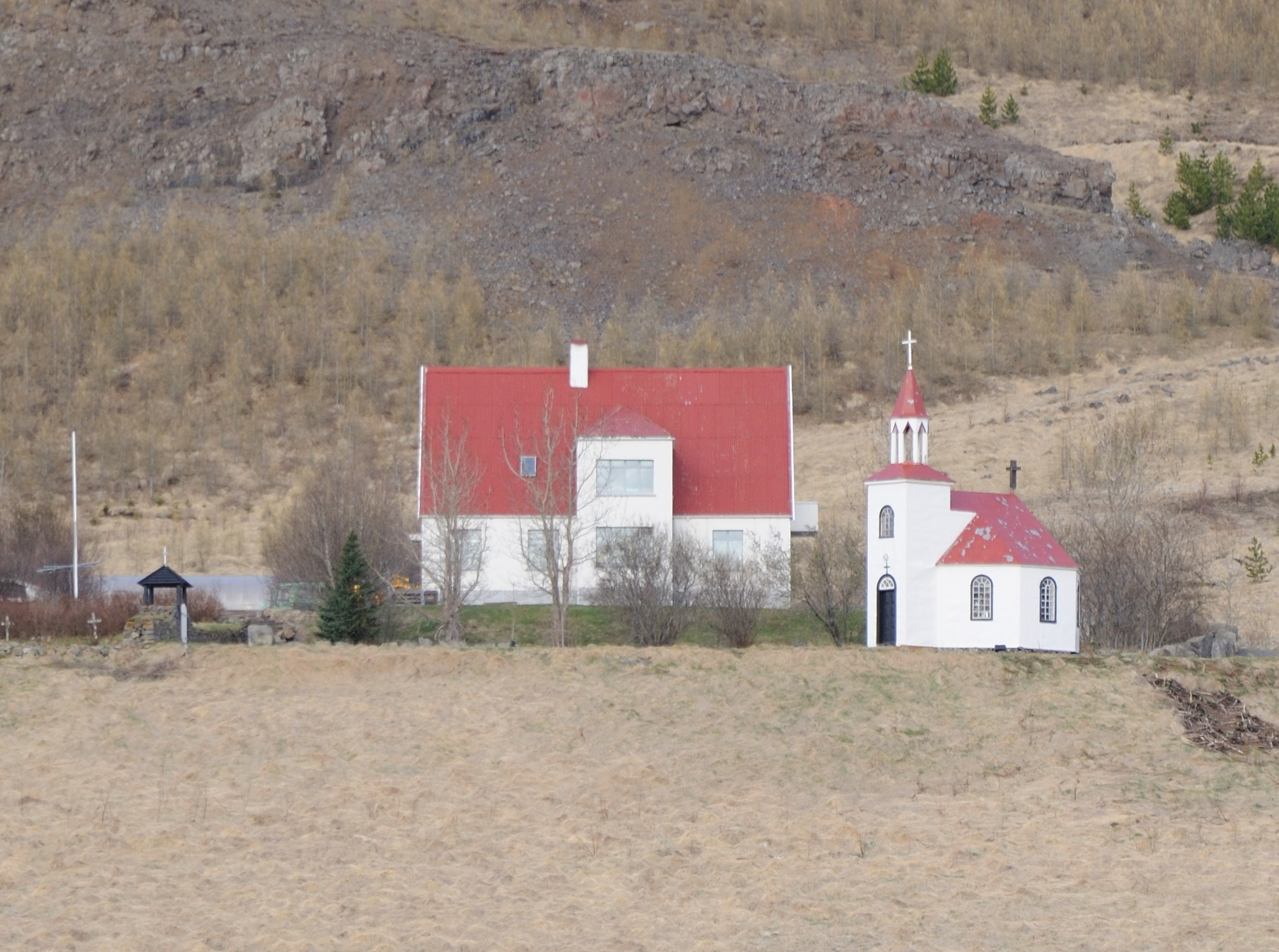
- Silfrastaðir
- Interactive map of Silfrastaðir
- Coordinates: 65.4411°N 19.1793°W
- Country: Iceland
- County: Skagafjörður

Silfrastaðir is a farm and church site at the mouth of the Norðurárdalur valley in Skagafjörður, Iceland.

The farm's property is vast, spanning from the Bóluá river in Blönduhlíð out to the Kotá river in Norðurárdalur. Most of the land is mountainous, located around Silfrastaðafjall mountain. It is now slated for reforestation. Previously, the entire Silfrastaðaafréttur mountain range belonged to the property of Silfrastaðir, but it was sold to the county in 1896 along with the smallholdings Hálfdanartunga and Krókárgerði in Norðurárdalur, which were abandoned and have not been rebuilt. The hreppur's corral, called Silfrastaðaréttur, is on a spit of land below the farm.

The turf church that was previously in Silfrastaðir, built in 1842, is now part of Árbæjarsafn outdoor museum in Reykjavík. The church that is there now is eight-sided and was built in 1896 (consecrated on July 12).

Within Norðurárdalur valley, a short way from the bridge over the Norðurá river, cape Skeljungshöfði runs towards a sandbank. There is a fairly large stone there called Skeljungssteinn. There are two holes running through the stone and, according to folk takes, the Skeljungur ghost had been bound to the stone, but the holes could actually be tracks from a log that lava had run over. The stone is a protected site. Bólu-Hjálmar recorded the folk tale about Skeljungur and the killer of Grímur. The Sturlunga Saga states that Eyjólfur ofsi (“the violent”) Þorsteinsson and his men had stopped at the Skeljungsskáli cabin on their way to the Flugumýri Arson, and it is not unlikely that there had been a farm there then.
