= Blönduhlíð =

District in Skagafjörður, Iceland

- District
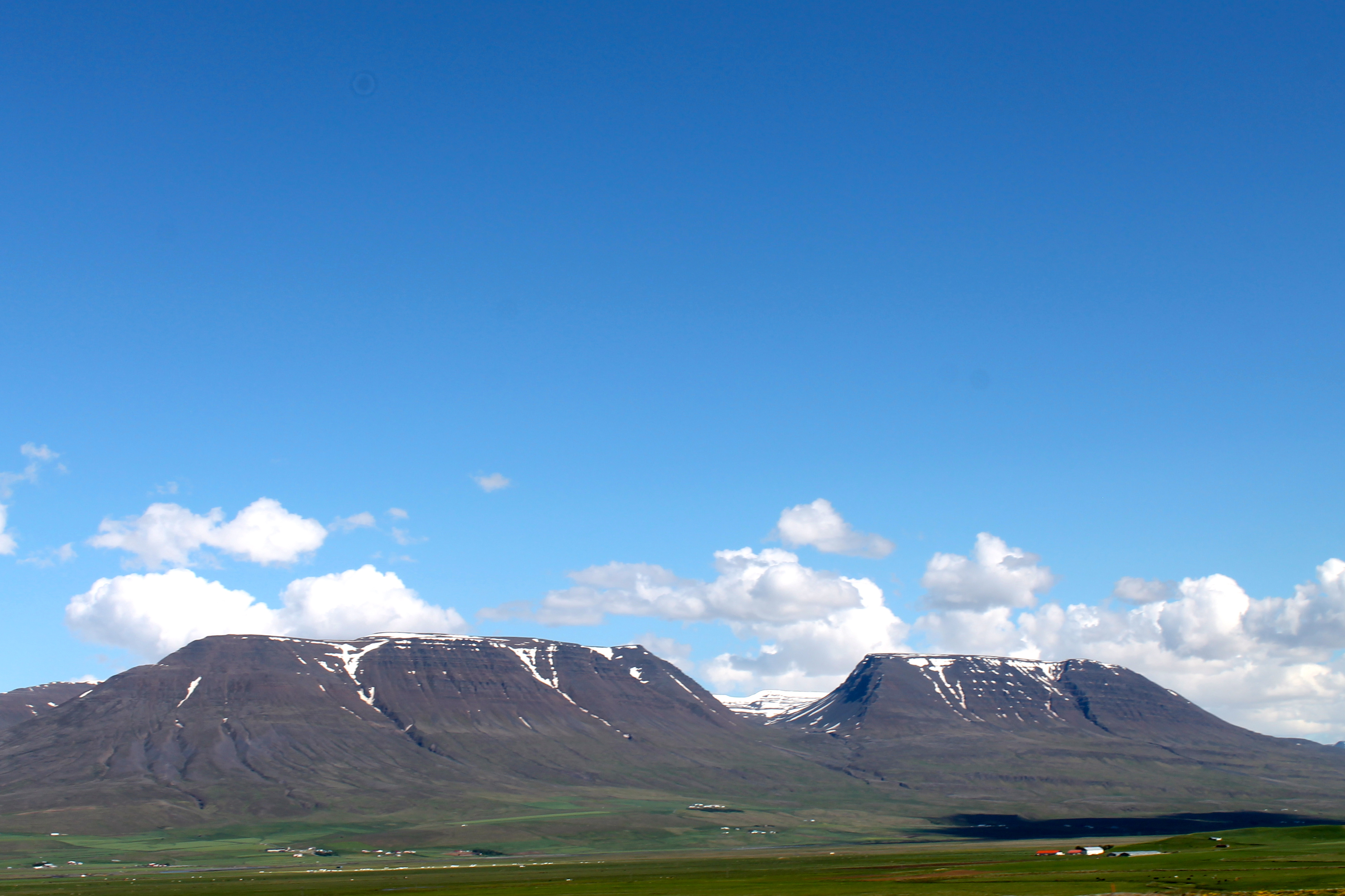
- Blönduhlíð
- Country: Iceland
- County: Skagafjörður (municipality)
- Time zone: UTC+0

Blönduhlíð is a district in Iceland in eastern Skagafjörður that lies along the Héraðsvötn river. It spans the area from the Bóluá river in the south of Blönduhlíð and the Kyrfisá river to the north.

Brekknapláss is the outermost part of Blönduhlíð in Skagafjöur, from the Þverá to the Kyrfisá river. There are a few farms there, such as Þverá, the birthplace of the priest Jón Steingrímsson—known as the "fire-and-brimstone" preacher—which is in the southernmost part of Blönduhlíð. Syðri-Brekkur, a little further south, is where prime minister Hermann Jónasson was from and where there is a monument in his honor. Hermann was the father of Steingrímur Hermansson, who also served as Iceland's prime minister.

== Places in Blönduhlíð ==
The following farms are located in Blönduhlíð:

- Akrar (Skagafjörður)
- Bóla
- Djúpidalur
- Flugumýri
- Frostastaðir
- Hjaltastaðahvammur
- Miklibær
- Silfrastaðir
- Úlfsstaðir
- Víðivellir

== Bibliography ==
- Hjalti Pálsson (ritstj.): Byggðasaga Skagafjarðar IV. bindi. Akrahreppur. Sögufélag Skagfirðinga, 2007. ISBN 978-9979-861-15-7
- Hallgrímur Jónasson: Árbók Ferðafélags Íslands. Skagafjörður. Ferðafélag Íslands, 1946.
