= Bólu-Hjálmar =

Icelandic poet (1796–1875)

19th-century sketch of Bólu-Hjálmar

Hjálmar Jónsson (29 September 1796 – 25 July 1875), better known as Bólu-Hjálmar (after his homestead in Bóla), was a 19th-century Icelandic farmer and poet, known for his sharp style and biting wit and for his mastery of the Icelandic poetic narrative style known as rímur.

== Life and works ==
Hjálmar was born in Hallandi in Eyjafjörður. His parents, Marsibil Semingsdóttir and Jón Benediktsson, were poor and unmarried, and he spent the first eight years of his life at the farm of Dálksstaðir, where he was raised by the widow Sigríður Jónsdóttir. He had little formal education, but he soon became an avid reader of the sagas and eddas. Hjálmar married Guðný Ólafsdóttir, and the pair began farming at Bakki in Öxnadalur. In 1829, they moved to Bóla (Bólstaðargerði) in Skagafjörður, from whence his nickname Bólu-Hjálmar was derived. The family had difficulty making ends meet, and Hjálmar was constantly engaged in disputes with his neighbours, who accused him of stealing sheep. He was found innocent but in 1839 left Bóla with his family. Their farmstead at Bóla is now deserted but a memorial to Bólu-Hjálmar has been erected there in a small grove. After his wife's death in 1845, Hjálmar gave up farming altogether.

In his own way, Hjálmar was an artistic and creative soul. His style of poetry is marked by economy and clever use of metaphors. Many of his poems are pointedly and unsentimentally critical and tinged with bitterness, which may partly be attributed to his constant rows and disputes, and partly to what seems to have been a general dislike of humanity.

An example of his bitterness, is this stanza, composed after he had received an anonymous donation. The stanza is the beginning of a longer poem, To an anonymous benefactor:

Víða til þess vott ég fann
þótt venjist oftar hinu,
að guð á margan gimstein þann,
sem glóir í mannsorpinu.

The benefactor eventually turned out to be bishop is:Pétur Pétursson.

He could also be tender in his poems, although examples are rare. But this is one, called Mannslát (News of a death):

Mínir vinir fara fjöld,
feigðin þessa heimtar köld.
Eg kem eftir, kannske í kvöld
með klofinn hjálm og rofinn skjöld,
brynju slitna, sundrað sverð og syndagjöld.

Here are sorrow and remorse woven together.

Bólu-Hjálmar was also a master of rímur and the associated metres (rímnahættir), as in this example from Göngu-Hrólfs rímur:

Fárleg vóru fjörbrot hans.
Fold og sjórinn léku dans.
Gæfusljór með glæpafans
Grímur fór til andskotans.

Hjálmar's talent extended to the on-the-spot verses. This is one example, where he met a rather tragic household on the move:

Aumt er að sjá í einni lest
áhaldsgögnin slitin flest,
dapra konu og drukkinn prest,
drembinn þræl og meiddan hest.

Bólu-Hjálmar was also a scholar; his work provides some of the main evidence for the life of Guðmundur Bergþórsson.
