= Skagafjörður (municipality) =

Municipality in northern Iceland

- Municipality
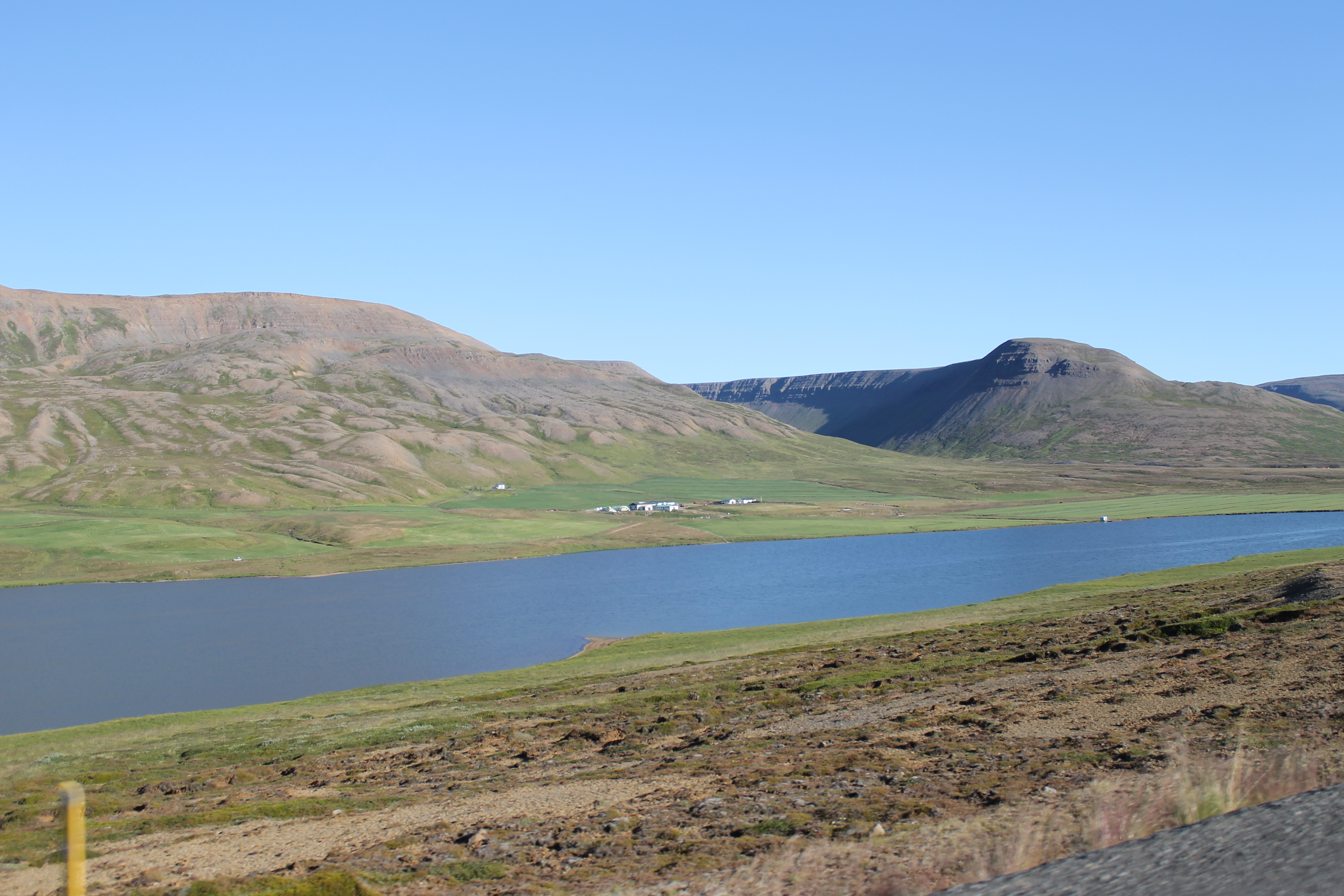
- Skyline of Skagafjörður

- Location of Skagafjörður municipality

- Location within Iceland
- Coordinates: 65°45′N 19°38′W
- Country: Iceland
- Region: Northwestern Region
- Constituency: Northwest Constituency

Government
  - Manager: Ásta Björg Pálmadóttir

Area
  - Total: 4,180 km^{2} (1,610 sq mi)

Population
  - Total: 3,978
  - Density: 0.95/km^{2} (2.5/sq mi)
- Postal code(s): 550, 551, 560, 565, 566, 570
- Municipal number: 5200
- Website: skagafjordur.is

Skagafjörður (Icelandic pronunciation: [ˈskaːɣaˌfjœrðʏr̥]) is a municipality that covers most of the land area of the region around the fjord with the same name (see Skagafjörður for details on the region) in northern Iceland.

== Overview ==
The municipality was created in 1998 when 11 out of the 12 municipalities in Skagafjörður held votes on whether they should merge or not. The merge was approved in all the municipalities that held the vote. Akrahreppur was the only municipality in Skagafjörður that did not participate. In February 2022, residents of Akrahreppur and Skagafjörður voted to merge into a single municipality. The merger was finalised in June 2022 and the name of the municipality was changed from Sveitarfélagið Skagafjörður to just Skagafjörður.

The merge joined the town of Sauðárkrókur, the villages of Hofsós and Varmahlíð and several rural districts. It also includes the historic cathedral site of Hólar which is the site of a growing university today.

== Localities ==
- Ábær
- Hofsós
- Hólar
- Keta
- Miklibær
- Reynistaður
- Sauðárkrókur
- Silfrastaðir
- Varmahlíð
- Viðvík

== Twin towns – sister cities ==
Skagafjörður is twinned with:

- Espoo, Finland
- Køge, Denmark
- Kongsberg, Norway
- Kristianstad, Sweden
