= List of churches in Iceland =

A list of churches in Iceland:

== Múlaprófastsdæmi ==
- Skeggjastaðakirkja
- Hofskirkja
- Vopnafjarðarkirkja
- Valþjófsstaðarkirkja
- Áskirkja
- Hofteigskirkja
- Eiríksstaðakirkja
- Möðrudalskirkja
- Vallaneskirkja
- Þingmúlakirkja
- Egilsstaðakirkja
- Eiðakirkja
- Hjaltastaðakirkja
- Kirkjubæjarkirkja
- Sleðbrjótskirkja
- Bakkagerðiskirkja
- Húsavíkurkirkja
- Seyðisfjarðarkirkja
- Klyppstaðakirkja

== Austfjarðaprófastsdæmi ==
- Norðfjarðarkirkja
- Mjóafjarðarkirkja
- Eskifjarðarkirkja
- Eskifjarðarkirkja
- Reyðarfjarðarkirkja
- Kolfreyjustaðarkirkja
- Fáskrúðsfjarðarkirkja
- Búðakirkja
- Heydalakirkja
- Stöðvarfjarðarkirkja
- Stöðvarkirkja
- Eydalakirkja
- Djúpavogskirkja
- Djúpavogskirkja
- Berufjarðarkirkja
- Beruneskirkja
- Hofskirkja
- Bænhúsið í Papey

== Skaftafellsprófastsdæmi ==
- Bjarnarneskirkja
- Hafnarkirkja
- Stafafellskirkja
- Hoffellskirkja
- Kálfafellsstaðarkirkja
- Hofskirkja
- Brunnhólskirkja
- Minningarkapella
- Bænhúsið á Núpsstað
- Prestbakkakirkja
- Kálfafellskirkja
- Þykkvabæjarkapella
- Þykkvabæjarklausturskirkja
- Langholtskirkja
- Grafarkirkja
- Skeiðflatarkirkja
- Reyniskirkja
- Víkurkirkja
- Sólheimakapella

== Rangárvallaprófastsdæmi ==
- Eyvindarhólakirkja
- Ásólfsskálakirkja
- Stóra-Dalskirkja
- Krosskirkja
- Akureyjarkirkja
- Voðmúlastaðakapella
- Safnkirkjan í Skógum
- Hlíðarendakirkja
- Breiðabólsstaðarkirkja
- Stórólfshvolskirkja
- Oddakirkja
- Kapella dvalarheimilisins Lundar á Hellu
- Keldnakirkja
- Þykkvabæjarkirkja
- Skarðskirkja
- Marteinstungukirkja
- Hagakirkja
- Árbæjarkirkja
- Kálfholtskirkja

== Árnesprófastsdæmi ==
- Eyrarbakkakirkja
- Stokkseyrarkirkja
- Gaulverjabæjarkirkja
- Hrunakirkja
- Hrepphólakirkja
- Tungufellskirkja
- Hveragerðiskirkja
- Kapellan Náttúrulækningaheilsuhælinu
- Kotstrandarkirkja
- Þorlákskirkja
- Hjallakirkja
- Strandarkirkja
- Mosfellskirkja
- Miðdalskirkja
- Úthlíðarkirkja
- Stóruborgarkirkja
- Búrfellskirkja
- Sólheimakapella
- Úlfljótsvatnskirkja
- Selfosskirkja
- Hraungerðiskirkja
- Villingaholtskirkja
- Laugardælakirkja
- Skálholtskirkja
- Bræðratungukirkja
- Haukadalskirkja
- Torfastaðakirkja
- Stóra-Núpskirkja
- Ólafsvallakirkja
- Þingvallakirkja í Þingvallaprestakalli

== Kjalarnesprófastsdæmi ==
- Grindavíkurkirkja
- Grindavíkurkirkja
- Kirkjuvogskirkja
- Útskálakirkja
- Hvalsneskirkja
- Keflavíkurkirkja
- Innri-Njarðvíkurkirkja
- Ytri-Njarðvíkurkirkja
- Hafnarfjarðarkirkja
- Krýsuvíkurkirkja
- Víðistaðakirkja
- Vídalínskirkja
- Garðakirkja
- Bessastaðakirkja
- Kálfatjarnarkirkja
- Mosfellskirkja
- Lágafellskirkja
- Reynivallakirkja
- Brautarholtskirkja
- Saurbæjarkirkja
- Hallgrímskirkja í Vindáshlíð
- Landakirkja í Vestmannaeyjaprestakalli
- Stafkirkja við Hringskersgarð

== Reykjavíkurprófastsdæmin ==
- Árbæjarkirkja í Árbæjarprestakalli
- Safnakirkjan í Árbæjarsafni
- Breiðholtskirkja
- Digraneskirkja
- Fella- og Hólakirkja
- Grafarvogskirkja
- Hjallakirkja
- Kópavogskirkja
- Seljakirkja
- Fossvogskapella
- Áskirkja
- Bústaðarkirkja
- Dómkirkjan
- Viðeyjarkirkja
- Grensáskirkja
- Hallgrímskirkja
- Háteigskirkja
- Friðrikskapella
- Langholtskirkja
- Laugarneskirkja
- Neskirkja
- Seltjarnarneskirkja

== Borgarfjarðarprófastsdæmi ==
- Hallgrímskirkja
- Leirárkirkja
- Innra-Hólmskirkja
- Kapellan í Vatnaskógi
- Akraneskirkja
- Hvanneyrarkirkja
- Bæjarkirkja
- Lundarkirkja
- Fitjakirkja
- Reykholtskirkja
- Reykholtskirkja
- Stóra-Áskirkja
- Gilsbakkakirkja
- Síðumúlakirkja
- Húsafellskirkja
- Stafholtskirkja
- Norðtungukirkja
- Hvammskirkja
- Hjarðarholtskirkja
- Borgarkirkja
- Borgarneskirkja
- Álftaneskirkja
- Álftártungukirkja
- Akrakirkja

== Snæfellsness- og Dalaprófastsdæmi ==
- Ingjaldshólskirkja
- Búðakirkja
- Hellnakirkja
- Staðarstaðarkirkja
- Staðarhraunskirkja
- Fáskrúðarbakkakirkja
- Rauðamelskirkja
- Kolbeinsstaðakirkja
- Miklaholtskirkja
- Ólafsvíkurkirkja
- Brimilsvallakirkja
- Grundafjarðarkirkja
- Setbergskirkja
- Stykkishólmskirkja
- Stykkishólmskirkja
- Helgafellskirkja
- Bjarnarhafnarkirkja
- Narfeyrarkirkja
- Breiðabólsstaðarkirkja
- St. Fransiskukapellan
- Hjarðarholtskirkja
- Kvennabrekkukirkja
- Snóksdalskirkja
- Stóra-Vatnshornskirkja
- Hvammskirkja
- Staðarfellskirkja
- Dagverðarneskirkja
- Skarðskirkja
- Staðarhólskirkja

== Barðastrandarprófastsdæmi ==
- Reykhólakirkja
- Staðarkirkja
- Garpdalskirkja
- Gufudalskirkja
- Múlakirkja
- Flateyjarkirkja
- Tálknafjarðarkirkja
- Stóra-Laugardalskirkja
- Brjánslækjarkirkja
- Hagakirkja
- Patreksfjarðarkirkja
- Sjúkrahúskapellan Patreksfirði
- Saurbæjarkirkja
- Sauðlauksdalskirkja
- Breiðavíkurkirkja
- Bíldudalskirkja
- Selárdalskirkja
- Selárdalskirkja, Samúels
- Otradalskirkja

== Ísafjarðarprófastsdæmi ==
- Hrafnseyrarkirkja
- Minningarkapella Jóns Sigurðssonar
- Álftamýrarkirkja
- Þingeyrarkirkja
- Tjarnarkapella
- Hraunskirkja
- Mýrakirkja
- Núpskirkja
- Sæbólskirkja
- Holtskirkja
- Kirkjubólskirkja
- Flateyrarkirkja
- Staðarkirkja
- Suðureyrarkirkja
- Hólskirkja
- Staðarkirkja
- Staðarkirkja
- Bænhúsið í Furufirði
- Ísafjarðarkirkja
- Sjúkrahúskapellan Ísafirði
- Hnífsdalskapella
- Súðavíkurkirkja
- Eyrakirkja
- Vatnsfjarðarkirkja
- Nauteyrarkirkja
- Melgraseyrarkirkja
- Unaðsdalskirkja
- Ögurkirkja

== Húnavatnsprófastsdæmi ==
- Árneskirkja
- Árneskirkja
- Hólmavíkurkirkja
- Staðarkirkja
- Drangsneskapella
- Kaldrananeskirkja
- Kollafjarðarneskirkja
- Óspakseyrarkirkja
- Prestbakkakirkja
- Staðarkirkja
- Melstaðarkirkja
- Staðarbakkakirkja
- Víðidalstungukirkja
- Efranúpskirkja
- Hvammstangakirkja
- Sjúkrahúskapellan Hvammstanga
- Kirkjuhvammskirkja
- Tjarnarkirkja
- Vesturhópshólakirkja
- Breiðabólsstaðarkirkja
- Þingeyraklausturskirkja
- Blönduóskirkja
- Blönduóskirkja
- Höskuldsstaðakirkja
- Höfðakirkja
- Hofskirkja
- Bergstaðakirkja
- Auðkúlukirkja
- Holtastaðakirkja
- Bólstaðarhlíðarkirkja

== Skagafjarðarprófastsdæmi ==
- Sauðárkrókskirkja
- Hvammskirkja
- Ketukirkja
- Sjávarborgarkirkja
- Glaumbæjarkirkja
- Víðimýrarkirkja
- Reynistaðarkirkja
- Mælifellskirkja
- Reykjakirkja
- Goðdalakirkja
- Ábæjarkirkja
- Miklabæjarkirkja
- Silfrastaðakirkja
- Flugumýrarkirkja
- Hofsstaðakirkja
- Hóladómkirkja (Hólar Cathedral)
- Viðvíkurkirkja
- Rípurkirkja
- Hofsósskirkja
- Hofskirkja
- Fellskirkja
- Barðskirkja
- Bænhúsið í Gröf
- Knappstaðakirkja
- Siglufjarðarkirkja
- Reykir í Tungusveit

== Eyjafjarðarprófastsdæmi ==
- Ólafsfjarðarkirkja
- Kvíabekkjarkirkja
- Vallakirkja
- Upsakapella Dalvík
- Tjarnarkirkja
- Urðarkirkja
- Dalvíkurkirkja
- Hríseyjarkirkja
- Stærra-Árskógskirkja
- Möðruvallarkirkja
- Glæsibæjarkirkja
- Bakkakirkja
- Bægisárkirkja
- Glerárkirkja
- Lögmannshlíðarkirkja
- Akureyrarkirkja
- Miðgarðskirkja
- Safnakirkjan
- Munkaþverárkirkja
- Kaupangskirkja
- Grundarkirkja
- Möðruvallarkirkja
- Saurbæjarkirkja
- Hólakirkja

== Þingeyjarprófastsdæmi ==
- Svalbarðskirkja í Laufásprestakalli
- Laufáskirkja
- Grenivíkurkirkja
- Hálskirkja í Ljósavatnsprestakalli
- Þorgeirskirkja
- Illugastaðakirkja
- Draflastaðakirkja
- Ljósavatnskirkja
- Þóroddsstaðarkirkja
- Lundarbrekkukirkja
- Skútustaðakirkja
- Reykjahlíðarkirkja
- Víðirhólskirkja
- Bænhúsið á Rönd
- Grenjaðarstaðarkirkja
- Þverárkirkja
- Einarsstaðarkirkja
- Neskirkja
- Bænhúsið á Végeirsstöðum
- Húsavíkurkirkja
- Brettingsstaðakirkja
- Flateyjarkirkja á Skjálfanda
- Skinnastaðarkirkja
- Garðskirkja
- Snartarstaðakirkja
- Raufarhafnarkirkja
- Þórshafnarkirkja
- Sauðaneskirkja
- Svalbarðskirkja

== Churches outside þjóðkirkju ==
- Fríkirkjan í Hafnarfirði
- Fríkirkjan í Reykjavík
- Fíladelfía
- Jósefskirkja
- Kirkja Óháða safnaðarins
- Landakotskirkja (Basilika Krists konungs)
- Maríukirkja
- Hvítasunnukirkjan
- Aðventistasöfnuðurinn
- Aðventistasöfnuðurinn á Ísafirði
