= Geldingaholt =

Farm in Skagafjörður, Iceland

- Farm
- Interactive map of Geldingaholt
- Coordinates: 65°35′18.193″N 19°28′1.589″W
- Country: Iceland
- County: Skagafjörður (municipality)

Geldingaholt is a farm in Skagafjörður, Iceland. It is west of the Héraðsvötn and was previously a part of Seyluhreppur. The farm is located on the eponymous rise in elevation in the Vallhólmur plain east of Langholt, just north of Varmahlíð. To the east of Geldingaholt runs the Húseyjarkvísl, where it is called Holtskvísl.

== History ==
Geldingaholt was one of Skagafjörður’s large farms, and chieftains lived there in past centuries. Þórður kakali “the cackler” Sighvatsson lived there for a time before he was called to meet with the king of Norway. He then put Oddur Þórarinsson in charge but, in January 1255, Eyjólfur ofsi “the raging” Þorsteinsson and Hrafn Oddsson mounted an attack against him, and Oddur was killed after mounting a vigorous defense.

When Gissur Þorvaldsson was summoned to meet with the king of Norway in 1254 after the Flugmýri arson, Gissur appointed Oddur Þórarinsson over his kingdom in Skagafjörður and ruled from Geldingaholt. Eyjólfur ofsi and Hrafn Oddsson, along with their formidable troops, went to Oddur during the winter and killed him.

There was a church dedicated to the Apostle Peter in Geldingaholt until 1756. Geldingaholt belonged the seat at Hólar and ran the estate for many centuries.
