= Svartá =

River in Skagafjörður, Iceland

Svartá Húseyjarkvísl
- Etymology: Icelandic for "Black River"

Location
- Country: Iceland
- Region: Skagafjörður

Physical characteristics
- Source: Spring
  - location: Eyvindarstaðaheiði
  - coordinates: 65°23′53.466″N 19°15′45.954″W
- Mouth: Héraðsvötn
  - location: 65°39′N 19°30′W
- Length: 40 km (25 mi)
- Discharge
  - location: Reykjafoss
  - average: 10.5 m³/s
  - maximum: 183 m³/s

Basin features
- Progression: Svartá, Húseyjarkvísl, Héraðsvötn, Skagafjörður
- Waterfalls: Reykjafoss

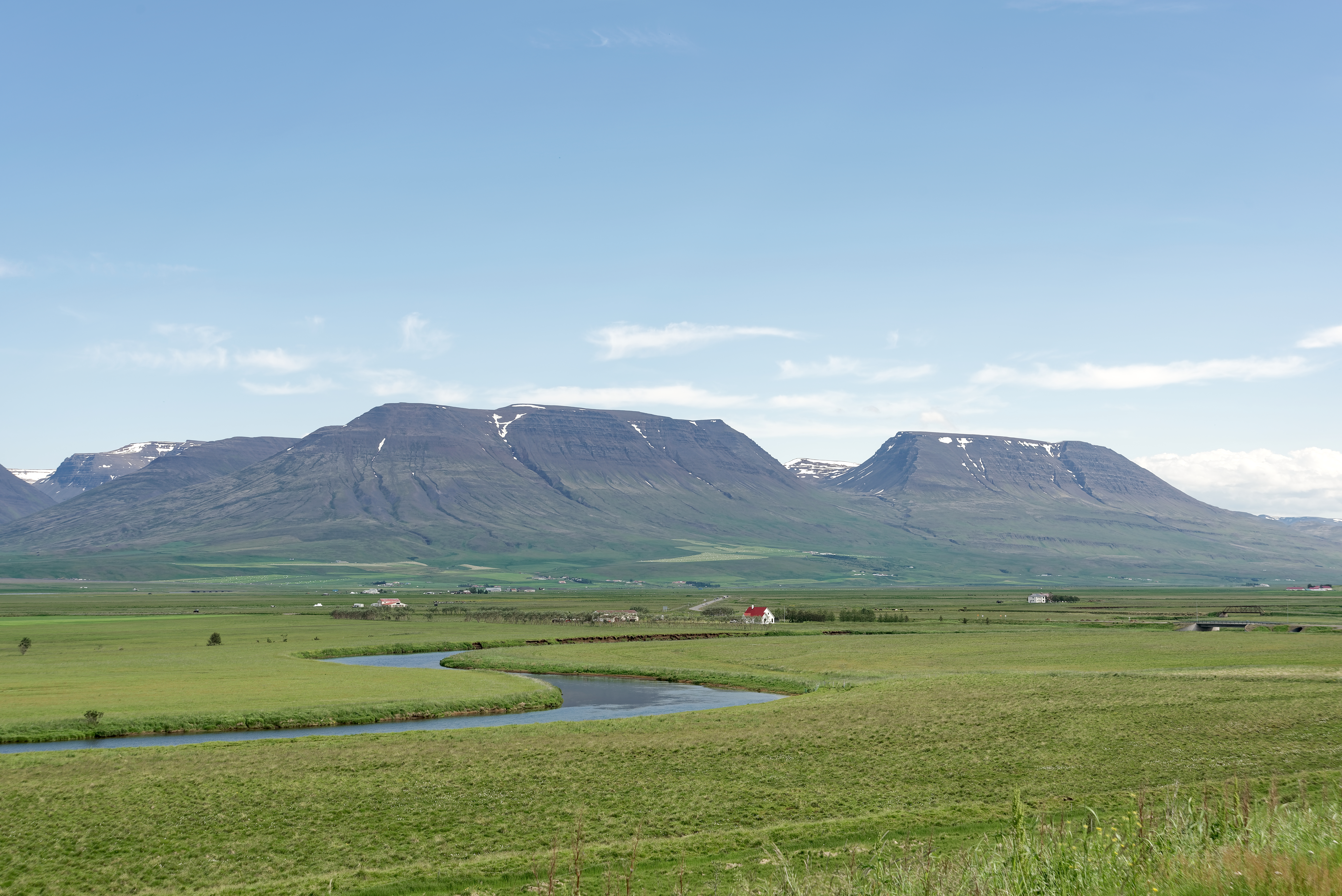
Svartá River

The Svartá river ("Black River") is a spring creek on the inner, western side of Skagafjörður, Iceland. A considerable amount of spring water runs in the river up to the highland where it then begins to resemble a direct run-off river as it flows on. The river surfaces in the Eyvindarstaðaheiði plateau and runs through Svartárdalur valley, then continues between Neðribyggð and Reykjatunga where there is a waterfall called Reykjafoss. Some ways below it, around Vindheimamelar, the river’s name changes to Húseyjarkvísl. It flows into the bottom of Varmahlíð and into the Héraðsvötn shortly before reaching Glaumbær.

In old literature, the Jökulsá river, or part of the Héraðsvötn, is said to have flowed west along the slopes of Vindheimabrekkur and that the Svartá ran into the glacier lake at the point where the river changes its name.

Many Icelandic rivers are named Svartá. Most flow into glacier rivers, whose water, or rather whose river beds, look very dark, nearly black, in comparison with the grey-brown glacier water.
