= Stóra-Seyla =

Stóra-Seyla Seyla, Brautarholt
- Town
- Stóra-Seyla
- Interactive map of Stóra-Seyla
- Coordinates: 65°34′19.434″N 19°29′2.072″W
- Country: Iceland
- County: Skagafjörður (municipality)
- Time zone: UTC+0

Stóra-Seyla, or Seyla, is a town and old manor in Langholt in Skagafjörður, Iceland. Previously, it was the location of the Seyluhreppur county assembly, which was named after the town.

The town was originally named just Seyla, but after the smallholding Litla-Seyla was developed, likely in the 17th century, it came to be called Stóra-Seyla. The town's namesake of Litla-Seyla was renamed to Brautarholt in 1915 but, since then, the town was typically referred to as only Seyla, although it is officially Stóra-Seyla. The name Seyla is thought to refer to a bog. The town has an extensive amount of land in Langholt, between Húseyjarkvísl to the east and Sæmundará to the west.

Seyla was part of the dowry that the bishop Gottskálk Nikulásson paid for his daughter Kristín when she married lawyer Þorvarður Erlendsson in 1508. Þorbergur Hrólfsson (1573 to September 8, 1656) likely acquired the estate early in the 17th century and his relatives lived there long after, albeit not continuously. His illegitimate son was the annalist Halldór Þorbergsson (1623–1711) who wrote the Seyluannáll (Seyla Annals). In 1713, printer Marteinn Arnoddson, who had a printing press in Hólar, lived in Seyla.

In the Middle Ages, there was a church in Seyla, which is mentioned in the Sturlunga Saga, where in 1255 Oddur Þórarinsson's corpse was reportedly moved after he was slain in Geldingaholt. Oddur died in a state of excommunication from the church and was therefore not permitted to be buried in holy ground—Seyla did not have an available plot in any case—so the body was buried under one of the cemetery walls.
