= Húseyjarkvísl =

River in Skagafjörður, Iceland

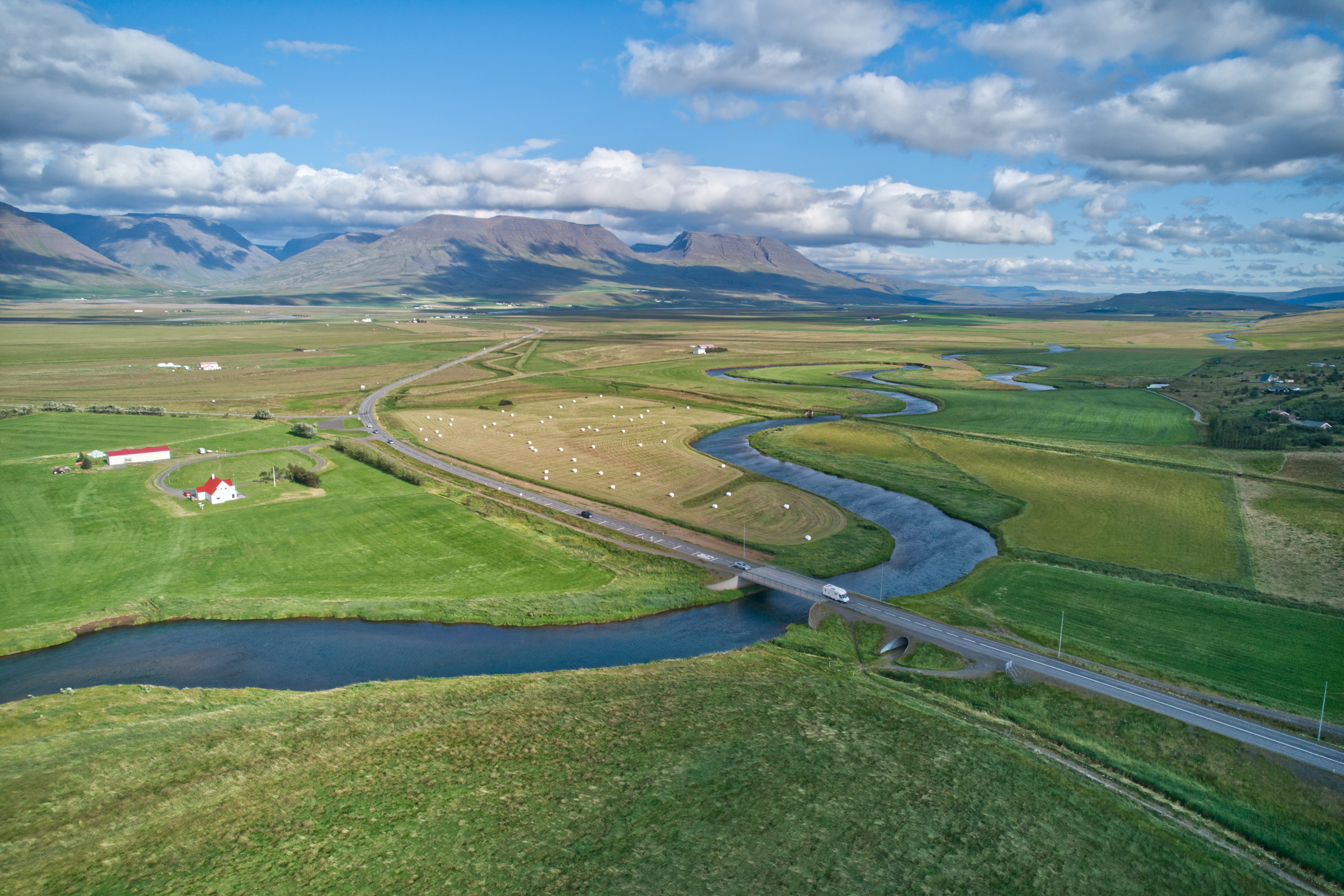
- Etymology: Literally translated, "Húseyja Branch," named for the Húsey farm in Vallhólmur

Location
- Country: Iceland
- County: Skagafjörður

Physical characteristics
- Mouth
  - coordinates: 65°32′51.223″N 19°25′36.563″W

Basin features
- Progression: Svartá, Húseyjarkvísl, Héraðsvötn, Skagafjörður
- Cities: Vallhólmur, Neðribyggð, Varmahlíð, Langholt

Húseyjarkvísl ("Húseyja Branch," named after the farm Húsey in Vallhólmur) is a rock stream in Skagafjörður, Iceland, that comes up to meet the Svartá ("Black River") in Eyvindarstaðaheiði. It runs down Svartárdalur along Reykjatunga into Vallhólmur, where its name then changes to Húseyjarkvísl. The river continues between Vallhólmur and Neðribyggð, below Varmahlíð and then out along Langholt before flowing into the Héraðsvötn.

There are salmon in Húseyjarkvísl, and it is a great place for trout fishing. The land that Húseyjarkvísl runs through is extremely level, and the majority of the river runs in placid bends.
