= Rípurhreppur =

Former municipality in Skagafjörður, Iceland

Rípurhreuppur
- Hreppur
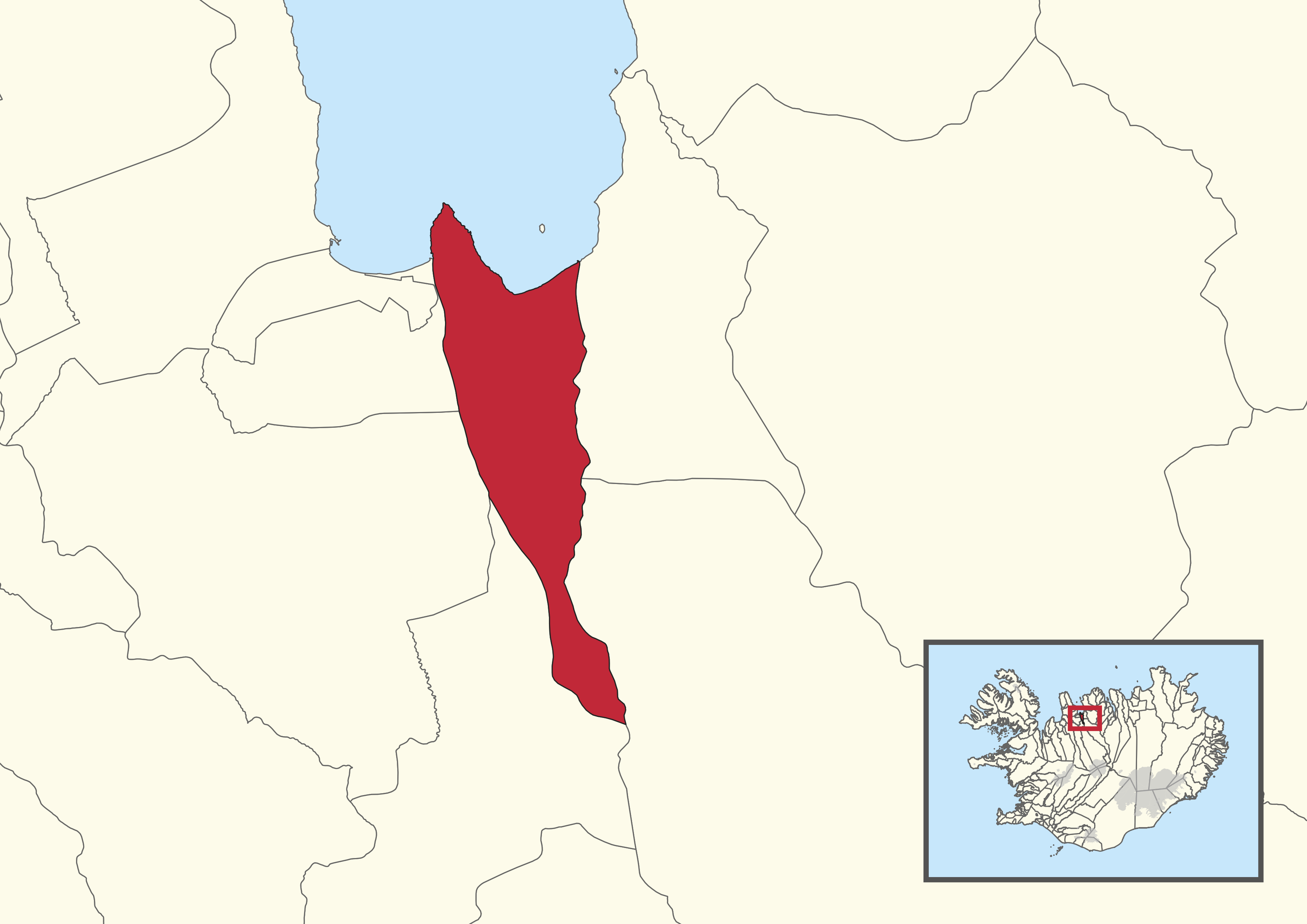
- Rípurhreppur
- Country: Iceland
- County: Skagafjörður
- Unification of Skagafjörður (municipality): June 6, 1998
- Towns: List: Ás, Keldudalur, Eyhildarholt, Hróarsdalur, Keta
- Time zone: UTC+0

Rípurhreuppur was a hreppur, an old Icelandic municipality, in the middle of Skagafjörður County, Iceland, named after the Ríp church site in Hegranes.

On June 6, 1998, Rípurhreppur joined ten other local governments to form Skagafjörður county: Skefilsstaðahreppur, Sauðárkrókur, Skarðshreppur, Staðarhreppur, Seyluhreppur, Lýtingsstaðahreppur, Viðvíkurhreppur, Hólahreppur, Hofshreppur, and Fljótahreppur.

== Hreppur Council ==
The last Rípurhreppur council was elected in the hreppur committee election on May 28, 1994, in which Lilja Ólafsdóttir, Pálmar Jóhannesson, Símon Traustason, Sævar Einarsson, and Þórunn Jónsdóttir were voted into office.

=== Council chairs ===
- 1874–1883 Ólafur Sigurðsson in Ás
- 1883–1888 Gunnar Ólafsson in Keldudalur
- 1888–1896 Ólafur Sigurðsson in Ás
- 1896–1901 Jónas Halldórsson in Keldudalur
- 1901–1908 Sigurjón Markússon in Eyhildarholt
- 1908–1936 Guðmundur Ólafsson in Ás
- 1936–1958 Gísli Magnússon in Eyhildarholt
- 1958–1962 Páll Sigurðsson in Keldudalur
- 1962–1974 Árni Gíslason in Eyhildarholt
- 1974–1986 Þórarinn Jónasson in Hróarsdalur
- 1986–1994 Árni Gíslason in Eyhildarholt
- 1994–1998 Símon Traustason in Keta
