= Tungusveit =

District in Skagafjörður, Iceland

- District
- Interactive map of Tungusveit
- Country: Iceland
- County: Skagafjörður (municipality)
- Boroughs: Farms: Reykir, Steinsstaðir

Tungusveit is a district in Skagafjörður, Iceland and may have previously spanned the majority of Lýtingsstaðahreppur, but now only covers the spit of land between the Héraðsvötn and Svartá rivers, from Vallhólmur up to the mouth of the Svartárdalur and Vesturdalur valleys. The area is often called Reykjatunga, after the church site Reykir í Tungusveit. The region is long and narrow, with a large number of farms.

== Reykir í Tungusveit ==
Reykir í Tungisveit (Reykir in Tungusveit) is a farm and church site in Tungusveit, located on the bank of the Svartá river. The farm was the location of a manor early in Iceland's settlement.

There is geothermal heat widely available on the Reykir estate and the neighboring properties belonging to Steinsstaðir, as well as more broadly throughout Reykjatunga, so much so that finding cold drinking water has often been a problem. There are many warm springs all around the farm in Rekyir and there is even geothermal heat in the grave yard, which is said to be one of the only heated cemeteries in the world.

Various historical sources mention the warm springs. The Sturlunga saga states that Gissur Þorvaldsson, Kolbein ungi, and their men soaked in the Skíðastairlaug and Reykjalaug springs before the Battle of Örlygsstaðir.

Sveinn Pálsson, doctor and natural scientist, who was born in Steinstaðir in 1762, described Reykir's warm springs in 1792, "Just to the east of the church in Reykir is a cold spring, which has been adapted as a bathing pond. The water can be warmed to anyone's desired temperature by adding water from a hot stream which flows by it."

A wooden church was built in Reykir in 1896 and rebuilt in 1976. It is a protected site.

== Steinsstaðir ==
Steinsstaðir is a farm in Tungusveit. It was an old manor and the settlement of Kráku-Hreiðar Ófeigsson. Farming was abandoned in Steinsstaðir in 1943, but the property was then distributed into several new farms and a small urban area has now built up there.

There is a lot of geothermal heat available in Steinsstaðir and the neighboring property of Reykir í Tungusveit. There has long been an old washing pool there called Steinsstaðalaug, which almost all of the area made use of. Sveinn Pálsson, a doctor and natural scientist who was born in Steinsstaðir in 1762, described the pool in 1792, stating "A short distance south from Reykir is the enchanting Steinsstaðalaug, which was not so hot as to be uncomfortable to bathe in. Therefore, it has become a washing and fulling location for just about the whole area." Páll Sveinsson, silversmith in Steinsstaðir and father of Sveinn, built a watermill by the stream leading to the pool.

In 1822, Jón Þorláksson Kærnested began offering swimming classes that would have been in Steinsstaðalaug, although others say that these may have taken place in Reykir. It is very probable that the authors of the journal Fjölnir, or at least some of the authors, had been among Jón's students there because Jónas Hallgrímsson and Brynjólfur Pétursson were studying in Goðdalir and Konráð Gíslason's home was nearby. After that, swimming lessons were offered sporadically, then every spring starting in 1890. The pool in Steinsstaðir was finally lined with stones and became the first public pool in Skagafjörður County. In 1925, work began on lining the pool in concrete, and it became the county's first concrete pool. The current pool came into use in 1980.

In 1949, a school was built in Steinsstaðir to serve the area and, until 1976, it had a dormitory as well. Instruction there was stopped in spring 2003 when the students began moving to the school in Varmahlíð. Now the school building is used for tourist services. The Árgaður community center was inaugurated in 1974.

Many new farms, industrial farms, and residences have been built on the original property, including the service tourist center in Bakkaflöt. There are also a number of summer homes.
