= Seyluhreppur =

Former municipality of Skagafjörður, Iceland

- Hreppur
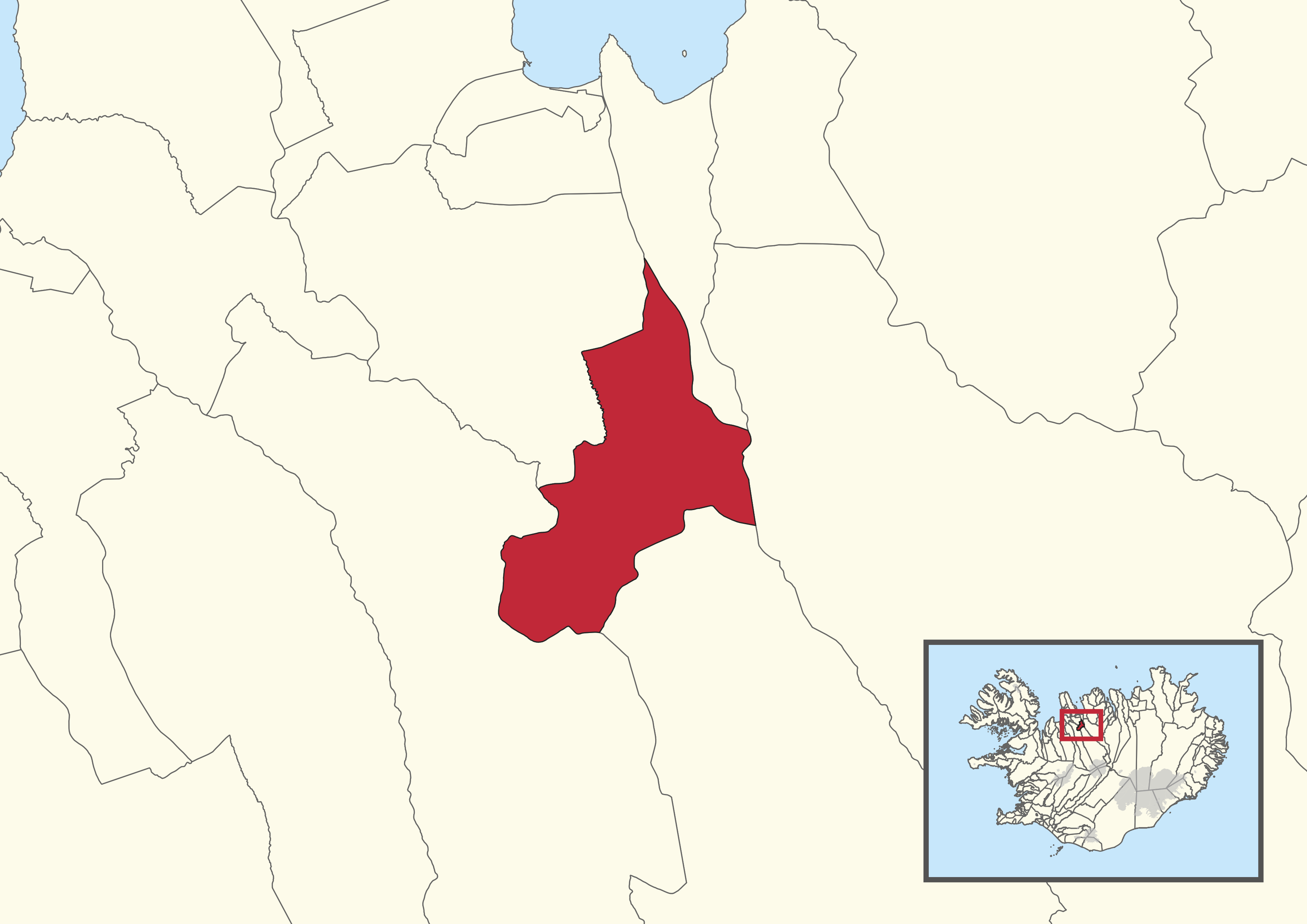
- Seyluhreppur
- Country: Iceland
- County: Skagafjörður (municipality)
- Formation of Skagafjörður (municipality): June 6, 1988
- Named for: Stóra-Seyla
- Towns: Krossanes, Fjall, Víðimýri, Valadalur, Marbæli, Brautarholt, Húsey, Stóra-Seyla, Vellir, Grófargil
- Time zone: UTC+0

Seyluhreppur is an old Icelandic hreppur, or rural municipality, that is today part of Skagafjörður County, Iceland. It is located west of the Héraðsvötn river and is named after the town of Stóra-Seyla in Langholt, which was where county assemblies were held.

Seyluhreppur consisted of four districts: Langholt, Vallhólmur, Víðimýrarhverfi, and Skörð, aside from Fjall, Geldingaholt, and Húsabakkabæirnir, which were not considered to belong to any of the four districts. Seyluhreppur is wide, but only of the hreppur's farms had land bordering the mountain. The municipality was completely located within the Glaumbær parish, where there were two churches: one in the town of Glaumbær and one in Víðimýri. In centuries past, there was also a church in Geldingaholt.

Agriculture was long the primary occupation of Seyluhreppur's population, but shortly before 1950, a small urban area developed in Varmahlíð, most of whose residents work in various types of businesses or in service jobs. Varmahlíð has a school, community center, hotel, and swimming pool, as well as shops and other services. After incorporating into the Skagafjörður County, 303 residents lived in the hreppur, with 125 in Varmahlíð.

On June 6, 1998, the hreppur joined ten other local municipalities to form the eponymous municipality of Skagafjörður: Skefilsstaðahreppur, Sauðárkrókur, Skarðshreppur, Staðarhreppur, Lýtingsstaðahreppur, Rípurhreppur, Viðvíkurhreppur, Hólahreppur, Hofshreppur, and Fljótahreppur.

== Hreppur Council ==
The last government council in Seyluhreppur was selected in the May 28, 1994 municipal elections. It consisted of Anna Sigríður Hróðmarsdóttir, Arnór Gunnarsson, Kristján Sigurpálsson, Sigurður Haraldsson, and Sveinn Allan Morthens.

Council chairs:

- 1874–1877 Stefán Einarsson in Krossanes
- 1877–1880 Magnús Jónsson in Fjall
- 1880–1884 Halldór Stefánsson in Víðimýri
- 1884–1888 Eyjólfur Hansson in Valadalur
- 1888–1892 Árni Jónsson in Marbæli
- 1892–1899 Sigurður Jónsson in Brautarholt
- 1899–1901 Jón Ásgrímsson in Húsey
- 1901–1919 Sigurður Jónsson in Brautarholt
- 1919–1935 Björn L. Jónsson in Stóra-Seyla
- 1935–1970 Haraldur Jónasson in Vellir
- 1970–1986 Jónas Haraldsson in Vellir
- 1986–1998 Sigurður Haraldsson in Grófargil
