= Langamýri =

Location of a former women's school in Skagafjörður, Iceland

- Farm
- Löngumýri
- Interactive map of Langamýri
- Country: Iceland
- County: Skagafjörður
- District: Vallhólmur

Langamýri (or Löngumýri) is a farm in Vallhólmur in Skagafjörður, Iceland, in the flatland off the east of Varmahlíð. The grammarian Konráð Gíslason was born there in 1808.

== History ==
In 1944, Ingibjörg Jóhannsdóttir founded a women's school, Húsmæðraskólinn á Löngumýri (The Homemaking School in Löngumýri), in her home of Langamýri on the land she inherited. Over 100 girls studied there over the next decade. Ingibjörg directed the school herself until 1967 when she gave the land to the state church on the condition that it would continue operating the school.

The Homemaking School was in Langamýri into the 1970s. It was then decommissioned because of low attendance, and a non-profit foundation offering various activities was established in its place under the auspices of the church.
