= Skagafjörður Folk Museum =

Museum and reconstructed farm in Iceland

- Byggðasafn Skagfirðinga
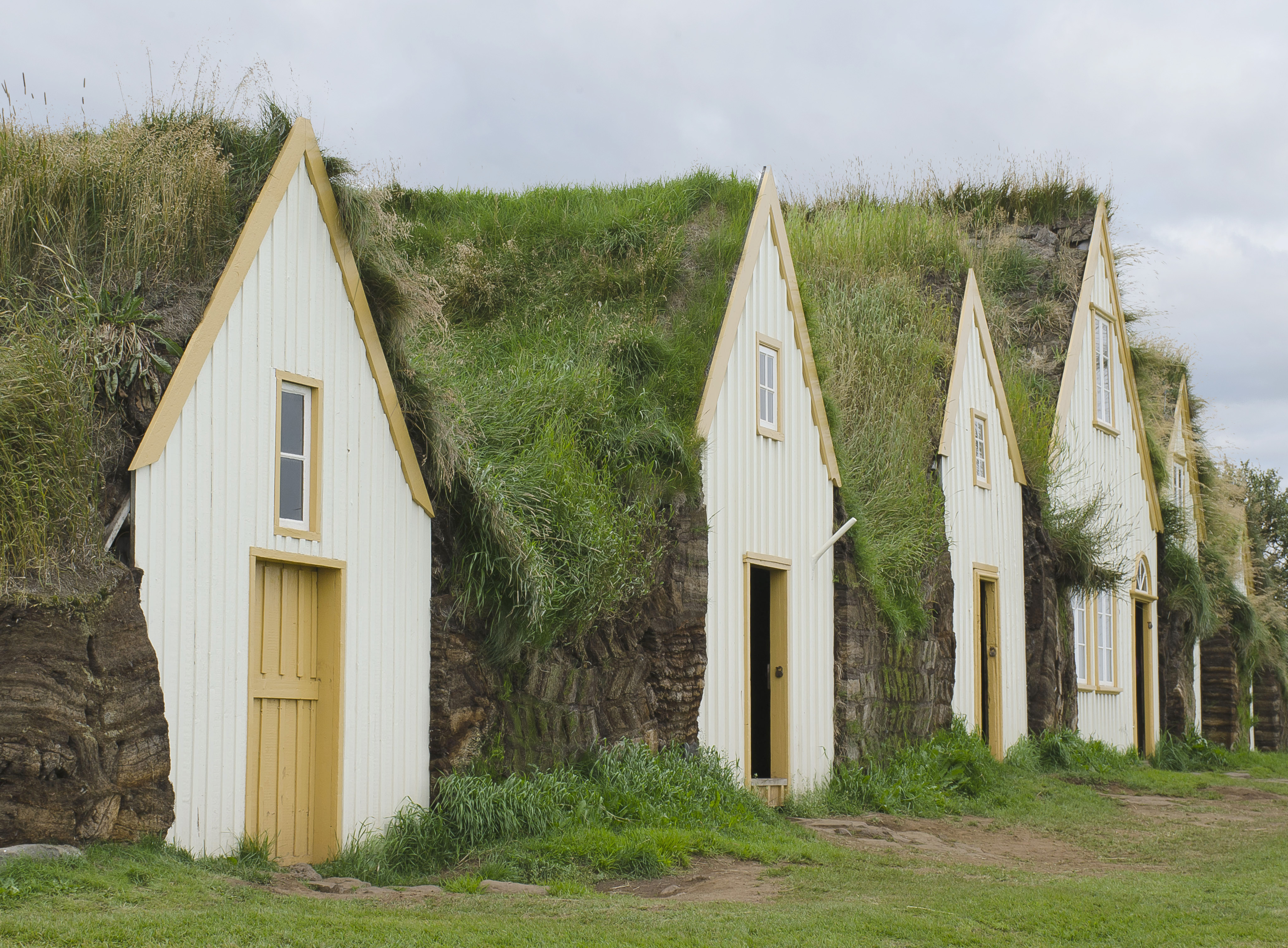
- Glaumbær turf houses
- Location: Glaumbær, Iceland
- Coordinates: 65°36′39″N 19°30′16″W
- Type: Open-air museum
- Website: https://www.glaumbaer.is/is/en

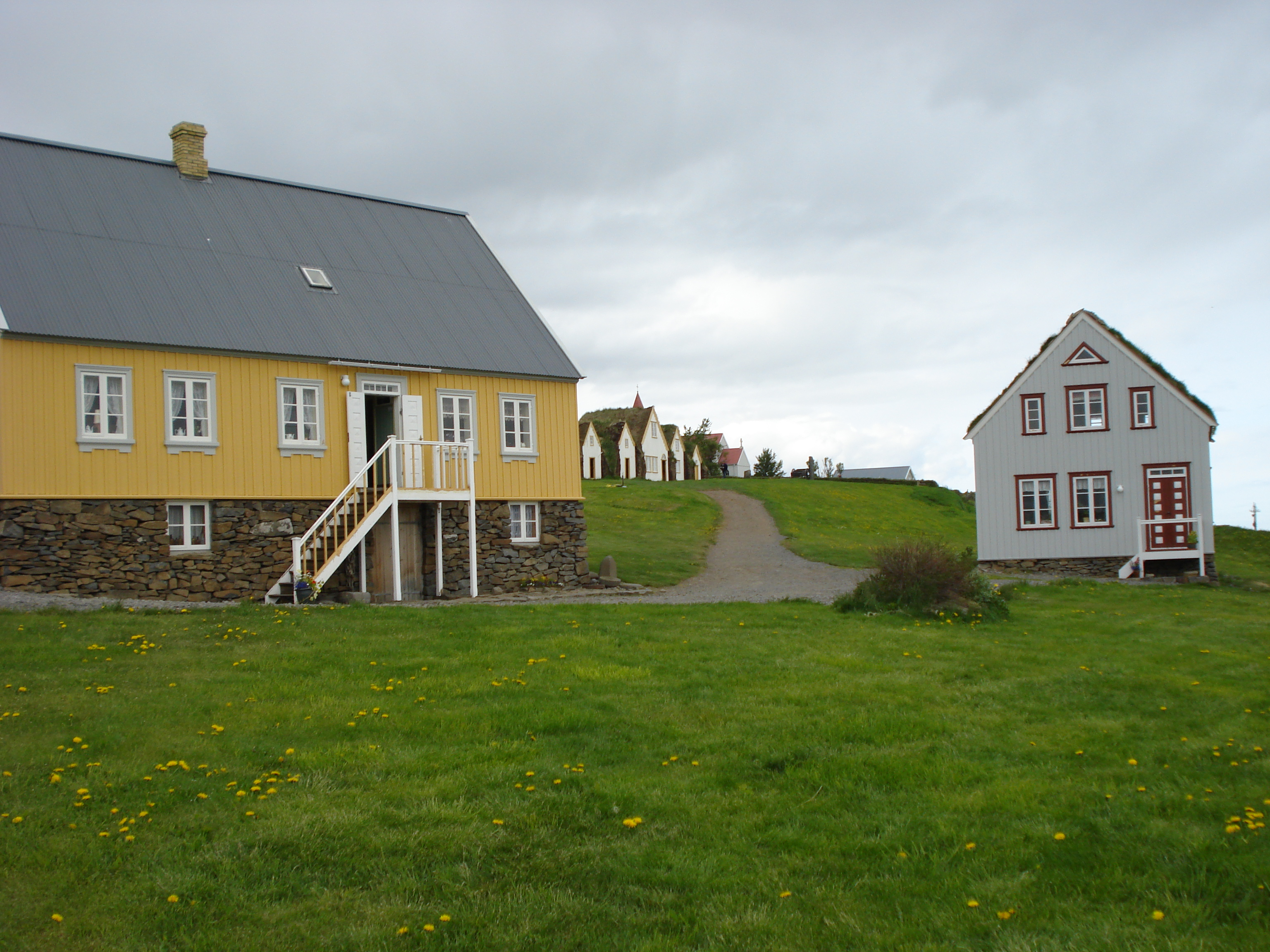
The site of the Skagafjörður Folk Museum, Áshús to the left, turf houses in the middle, and Gilsstofa to the right.

The Skagafjörður Folk Museum is an outdoor settlement museum that was established in 1948 when the National Museum of Iceland acquired the rights to use the old town of Glaumbær at Langholt. It is also a center for housing Skagafjörður artifacts.

The turf houses in Glaumbær were lived in up until the year 1947 when the National Museum of Iceland acquired the site. The Skagafjörður Folk Museum, founded on May 29, 1948, obtained the rights to use the town and opened an exhibition there on June 15, 1952. The museum's turf houses contain many items; most are tools related to domestic life and techniques used in an earlier era. The complex consists of thirteen turf houses, six with front-facing gables. The site is unique among Icelandic turf farms insofar as very small stones are used in the walls in a way that is rarely found in the municipality of Glaumbær.

Two old wooden houses have been moved to the museum site at Glaumbær. Áshús is from Ás in Hegranes. It was built between 1884–1886 to house Skagafjörður's women's school. It never fulfilled its original purpose and was used as a residence until 1977. It was then relocated to Glaumbær in 1991. The house is now a coffee shop, exhibit, and storage area.

Gilsstofa was originally built in Espihóll in Eyjafjörður in 1849. It was taken down in 1861 and moved to Akureyri. From there it was transported by boat to Kolkuós, re-built in Hjaltastaðir in Blönduhlíð, moved to Reynistaður in 1872, to Gil in Borgarsveit in 1884, and finally to Sauðárkrókur in 1891 where it stood until 1985 when it was moved to Kringlumýri in Blönduhlíð. It stayed there until 1996 and was reconstructed there to be as close to the original as possible, but little was left of the original wood after its many relocations. It now contains the museum shop and office, plus an area for the staff.

In 1998 the museum acquired artifacts from Sauðárkrókur to display. The museum there also has a permanent exhibition located in the old workshops from Krókurinn, as well as special exhibitions. This exhibition is now permanently closed. The museum offices are now located in Glaumbær. The museum has set up many displays in Skagafjörður, such as in Hólar and Hofsós, and has published a variety of materials about the culture of Skagafjörður's buildings.
