= Vallalaug =

Warm spring in Skagafjörður, Iceland

- Location: Skagafjörður, Iceland
- Coordinates: 65°32′11.508″N 19°23′5.737″W

Vallalaug is a warm spring located in the Ytri-Vallholt farm in Vallhólmur in Skagafjörður, Iceland. The spring is centrally located and served as a gathering place, which was sometimes used as a regional parliament in centuries past. Sturla Sighvatsson and his men were there for the Battle of Örlygsstaðir in 1238, and some accounts state that his men met at Vallalaug. Later on, three local municipalities (Akrahreppur, Seyluhreppur, and Lýtingsstaðahreppur) used it for assemblies, which were often mentioned in old legal rulings and other sources. It would have served as a parliamentary meeting place into the middle of the 18th century.

The spring has all but disappeared because of its use in generating power. There are faint ruins near the spring, likely from old shops.
