= Hannes Bjarnason =

Icelandic priest and poet

Hannes Bjarnason (14 January 1777 – 9 November 1838) was an Icelandic priest and poet based in Skagafjörður.

He was born in Djúpidalur in Blönduhlíð, the son of Bjarni Eiríksson and his wife Sigríður Jónsdóttir. He graduated from Hólar College in 1801. In the following years, he applied for various priesthoods but was not accepted, and it was believed that this could be traced to some extent to his writing of verses and language. He married Sigríður Jónsdóttir from Litla-Dunhagi, Hörgárdalur and they lived on various farms in the eastern part of Skagafjörður. Bjarnason eventually became a priest at Ríp in Hegranes in 1829 and held that post until his death.

Gissurarson's niece was Efemía Benediktsdóttir, wife of the historian Gísli Konráðsson, and Hannes and Gísli were friends and wrote together, including Andrarímur, which was published in 1834.
