= Langholt =

District in Skagafjörður, Iceland

- Interactive map of Langholt
- Coordinates: 65°35′53″N 19°31′45″W
- Country: Iceland
- County: Skagafjörður (municipality)
- Named after: Langholt means "long hill" in Icelandic

Langholt is a district in Skagafjörður, Iceland that lies to the west of Héraðsvötn and alongside a broad, low hill that runs from Reykjarhóll along Varmahlíð, in the lee of Reynistaður to the north. The southern part of Langholt used to belong to Seyluhreppur and the northern part to Staðarhreppur, but now both of these rural districts belong to the larger municipality of Skagafjörður county. Route 1 from Varmahlíð to Sauðárkrókur runs through Langholt.

Langholt is home to quite a few fertile and densely populated farms, all located to the east of the hill. The southern part of the hill is called Seyla (officially Stóra-Seyla), from which Seyluhreppur derived its name. A short distance from there is the farm Ytra-Skörðugil, where the savant Gísli Konráðsson lived for a long time. The Glaumbær church site, which is now the Skagafjörður Folk Museum, is located halfway up the hill. At the end of the hill is Staðará river (also called Sæmundará), south of Reynistaður.

== Sources ==
- Hjalti Pálsson (ritstj.): Byggðasaga Skagafjarðar II. bindi. Staðarhreppur - Seyluhreppur. Sögufélag Skagfirðinga, 2001. ISBN 978-9979-861-10-2
