= Gottskálksannáll =

Gottskálksannáll (from Old Norse, "Gottskálk's Annal") is a medieval Icelandic manuscript, named for its presumed author, Gottskálk Jónsson, a priest at Glaumbær, Skagafjörður, in the north of Iceland. Unlike other similar annals, it was not written during the period it chronicles, but rather in the second half of the 16th century. Gottskálksannáll. Despite the fact that these annals were written later on, they provide a significant amount of information about events in the 14th century, including details about monastic culture, especially between 1300 and 1394. However, given that these accounts were written after the fact, their contents must be considered cautiously. Some speculate that the entries from between 636 and 1394 come from annals that are now lost.

== Bibliography ==
Eldbjørg Haug, The Icelandic Annals as Historical Sources, 1997
