= Rögnvaldur Ólafsson =

Rögnvaldur Ólafsson (5 December 1874, Ytri Húsum in Dyrafjörður – 14 February 1917) was an Icelandic architect. He is often considered the first Icelandic architect, even though he never completed formal studies in architecture.

He studied at the Copenhagen Technical College from 1901 to 1904 but was unable to complete his studies due to tuberculosis. He struggled from tuberculosis for the remainder of his life, ultimately dying from the disease at the age of 42.

Rögnvaldur's designs were influenced by the Swiss chalet style and neoclassical architecture. Despite his illness and a short life, Rögnvaldur was considered a prolific and influential Icelandic architect. Some of his notable works include the Postal Office in Reykjavík; the agricultural colleges at Hólar and Hvanneyri; the churches in Keflavík, Hafnarfjörður, and Húsavík; and several buildings surrounding Tjörnin, a prominent small lake in central Reykjavík.
