= Eyvindarstaðaheiði =

Plateau in Skagafjörður, Iceland

- Plateau
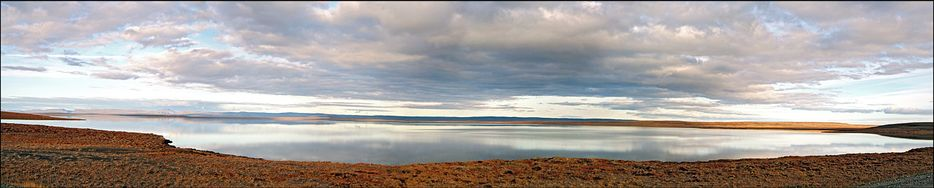
- Blondulón reservoir
- Interactive map of Eyvindarstaðaheiði
- Coordinates: 65°17′33.824″N 19°31′58.786″W
- Location: Skagafjörður and Austur-Húnavatnssýsla, Iceland
- Elevation: 400–500 meters

Eyvindarstaðaheiði is an expansive plateau and rangeland located between the Blanda river in Austur-Húnavatnssýsla and Vestari-Jökulsá in Skagafjörður, Iceland. It is close to the Hofsjökull glacier at a lower elevation than the common grazing pastures in Skagafjörður and Húnavatnssýsla.

== Geography ==
Eyvindarstaðaheiði is the easternmost of the plains that encompass the plateau from the north of Langjökull glacier and Kjölur. Auðkúluheiði plateau is west of Eyvindarstaðaheiði and east of that is Hofsafrétt. The plateau used to belong to Eyvindarstaðir in Blöndudalur valley, from which it derives its name. The area's grazing land is held collectively between Húnavatnssýsla and Skagafjörður counties, which border it.

The landscape on the western side of the plateau is shaped by the glaciers and is widely covered with thick moraine and sedimentary layers. The land there is flat, level, and covered in a decent amount of vegetation. Most of the area is about 400–500 meters above sea level. The western side follows the northern side of Blöndudalur and Svartárdalur valleys in Austur-Húnavatnssýsla and ends in the ridge that separates the valleys. The eastern side of the plateau is largely elevated and stony, with little vegetation, and several valleys intersect it.

Quite a few rivers and lakes run through the plateau. The easternmost is Vestari-Jökulsá, which originates in various branches along Hofsjökull and flows in a deep ravine around Goðadaladalur valley down through Vesturdalur valley. The Svartá river in Skagafjörður originates in Svartá basins and flows down through the floor of the Svartádalur valley. The Svartá river in Húnavatnssýsla originates in so-called Bugar ("the [river] bends") and has various names from there on, including Svartá in Svartádalur. The river flows into the Blanda river where the Svartádalur and Blöndudalur valleys meet. Blanda is on the western border of the plateau. It originates from a number of branches and also flows into several tributaries, including Strangakvísl, Haugakvísl and Galtará.

Part of Eyvindarstaðaheiði and Auðkúluheiði was put to use for the Blöndulón reservoir in summer 1991. The reservoir is 57 kilometers squared and its surface is 500 meters above sea level.

There are heavily trafficked roads around Eyvindarstaðaheiði leading through Skagafjörður, Svartðadalur, and Blöndudalur, both south to Route F35 and west of Stórisandur.
