= Miklabæjar-Solveig =

18th-century Icelandic woman

Miklabæjar-Sólveig (died 11 April, 1778) (Icelandic pronunciation: [ˈmɪhklaˌpaiːjar ˈsoulˌveiːɣ]) was an Icelandic woman who lived in the late 18th century and the subject of local folklore.

== Legend ==
Sólveig is said to have committed suicide after an unrequited love affair with Reverend Oddur, a minister, at his manor in Skagafjörður. After the local church refused her dying request to be buried in the churchyard, her ghost supposedly haunted the manor, the minister, his family, and his staff. According to the tale, Sólveig's ghost was responsible for Reverend Oddur's later disappearance. Sólveig’s remains were moved to a cemetery in Glaumbær in 1937. The tale has been compared to gothic romance.

== Popular culture ==
Poet Einar Benediktsson wrote the poem “Hvarf séra Odds á Miklabæ” (The Disappearance of Reverend Oddur from Mikilbær) based on the legend of Oddur and Miklabæjar-Sólveig.
