= Húsavíkurkirkja =

Church in Húsavík, Iceland

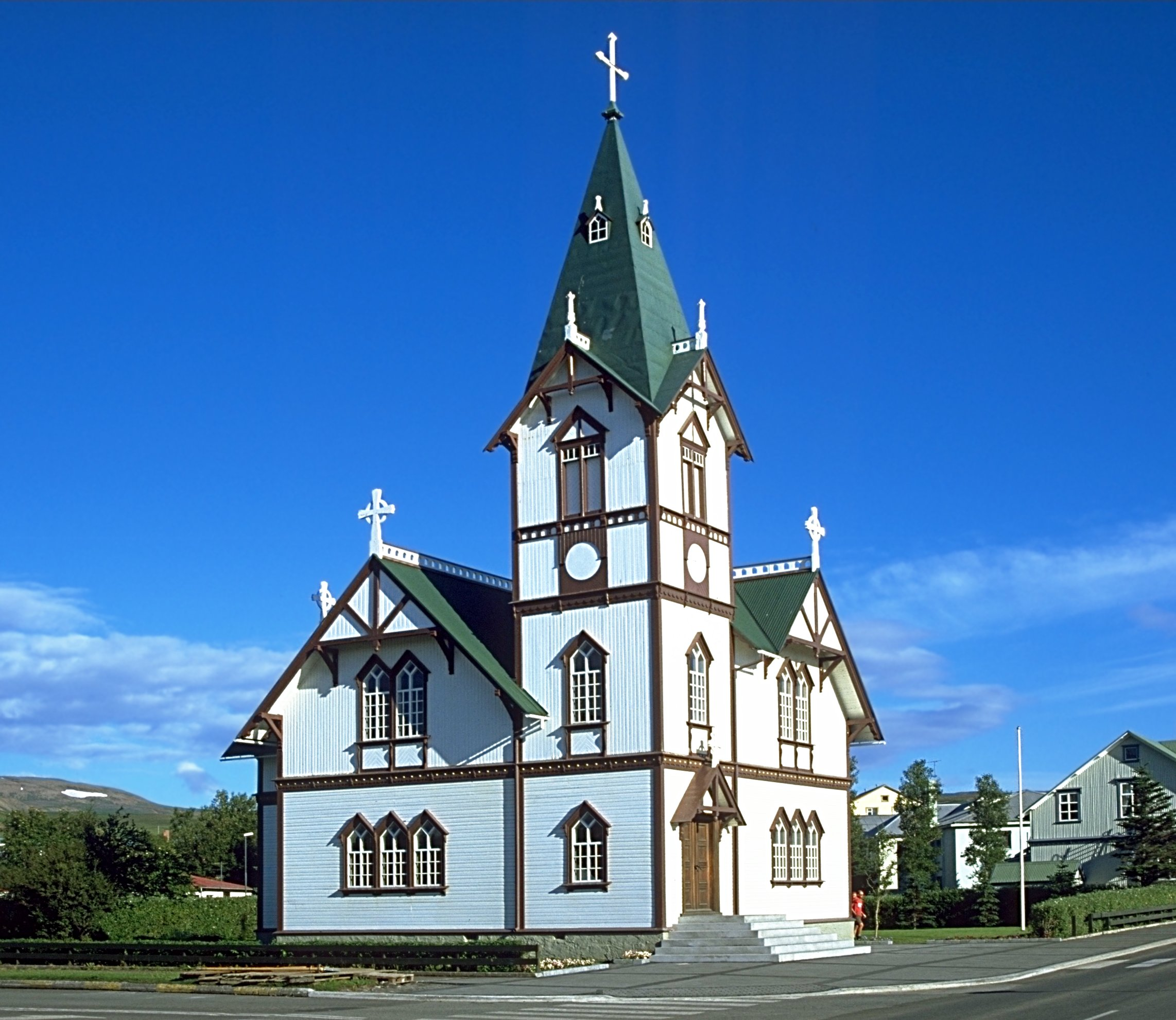

Location
- Location: Húsavík, Iceland
- Interactive map of Húsavíkurkirkja
- Coordinates: 66°02′45″N 17°20′32″W

Architecture
- Type: Steeple church
- Style: Swiss chalet style
- Completed: 1907

The Húsavíkurkirkja ([ˈhuːsaˌviːkʏrˌcʰɪr̥ca]) is an early 20th century church in Húsavík, Iceland. The wooden church was built in 1907 by Icelandic architect Rögnvaldur Ólafsson. The church hosts marriages, baptisms, funerals, and an annual general meeting.

== See also ==
- List of churches in Iceland
