= Gísli Konráðsson =

Icelandic farmer, folklorist and historian (1787–1877)

Gísli Konráðsson (18 June 1787 – 2 February 1877) was an Icelandic farmer, folklorist and historian in the 19th century. He was born at Vellir, a farm in Vallhólmur in Skagafjörður.

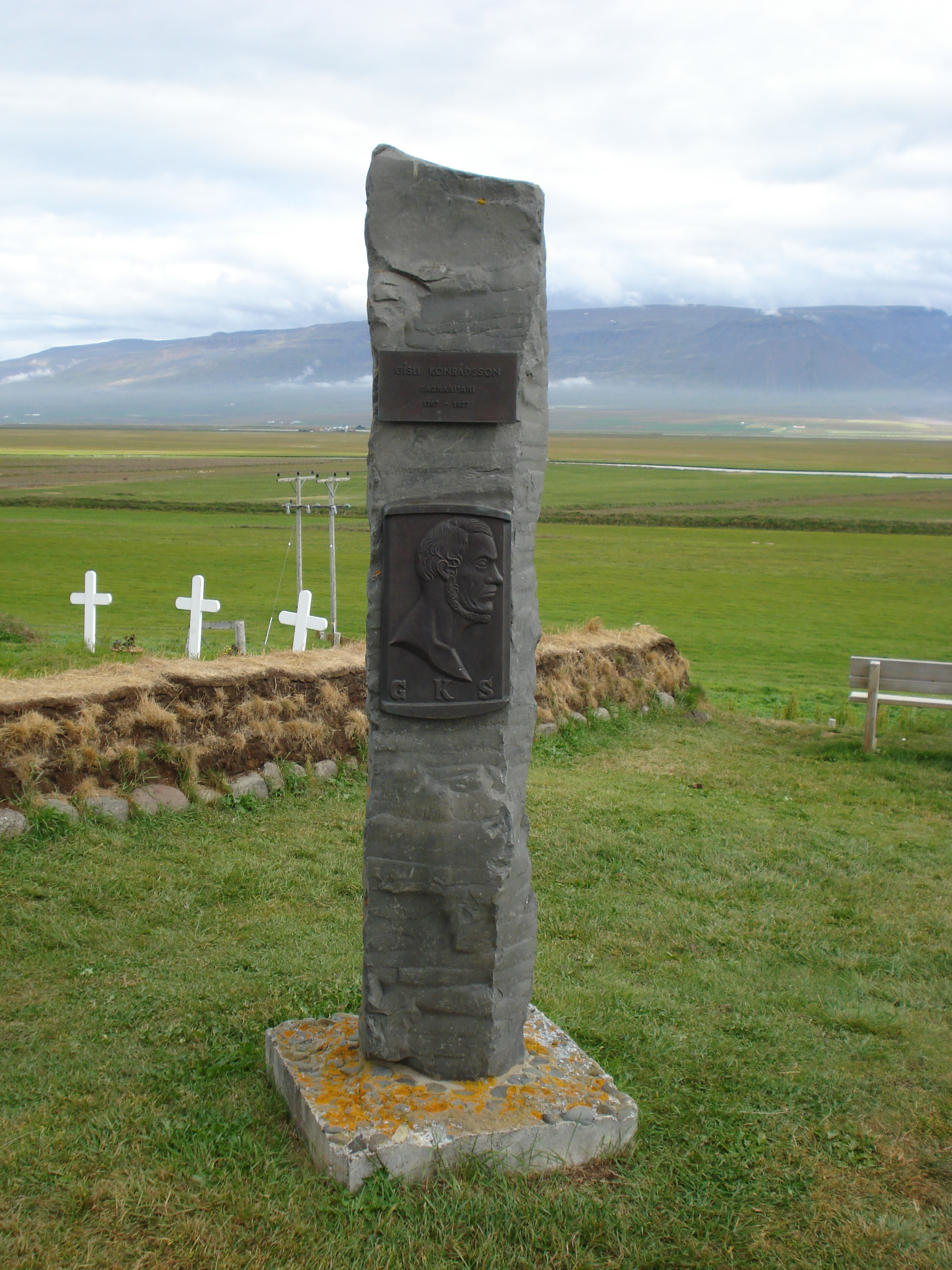
Monument to Gísli Konráðsson at Glaumbær in Skagafjörður.

Konráðsson married Efemía Benediktsdóttir, the niece of poet Hannes Bjarnason. Gísli and Efemía wrote a number of books together, including Andrarímur, which was published in 1834.
