= Smári Varmahlíð =

Icelandic sports club

- Full name: Ungmenna- og íþróttafélagið Smári, Varmahlíð
- Short name: Smári
- Sport: Basketball; Football; Track and field
- Founded: 1995
- Based in: Varmahlíð

Ungmenna- og íþróttafélagið Smári, Varmahlíð (lit. 'Clover Youth and Sports Club'), commonly known as Smári or Smári Varmahlíð, is a multi-sport club in Varmahlíð, Iceland. It fields departments in basketball, football, and track and field.

== Basketball ==
=== Men's basketball ===
==== Notable players ====
Note: Flags indicate national team eligibility at FIBA-sanctioned events. Players may hold other non-FIBA nationalities not displayed.

Criteria

To appear in this section a player must have either:

- Set a club record or won an individual award while at the club
- Played at least one official international match for their national team at any time
- Played at least one official NBA match at any time.

- (Iceland) Kári Marísson
