= Keldudalur =

Town on the Hegranes peninsula in Skagafjörður, Iceland

- Town
- Location within Iceland
- Country: Iceland
- County: Skagafjörður (municipality)

Keldudalur is a town on the southwest end of the Hegranes peninsula in Skagafjörður, Iceland. In recent years, significant archaeological excavations have taken place there.

== History ==
In the middle of the 19th century, Jón Samsonarson, the first member of parliament for Skagafjörður, lived in Keldudalur. He led various progressive issues on behalf of the people in Skagafjörður and he was an accomplished carpenter who constructed the church in Víðimýri.

== Archaeological site ==
In 2002, when ground was broken for Keldudalur’s tourist services building, human bones were found and the antiquities officer was made aware. It was soon discovered that there was a cemetery that no one had known about, since there were no extant sources about the church in Keldudalur. The graveyard proved to be from Iceland’s first centuries of Christianity; the first graves seemed to have been dug in or shortly after the year 1000, but the cemetery fell into disuse by 1300. Fifty-two intact graves were found and the bones were considered to be in excellent shape, especially the infant bones, which were uniquely well-preserved compared to other excavations. The soil composition led to the remains being as well preserved as they were.

Underneath the church yard, clear remains of a hut from the age of settlement were discovered and, nearby, a group of pagan graves were found. This included bones from a greyhound, which had not previously been found in Iceland. The remains of various ancient structures were discovered in additional excavations in Keldudalur and they are considered extremely well preserved.
