= Breiðabólsstaðarkirkja =

Church in Iceland

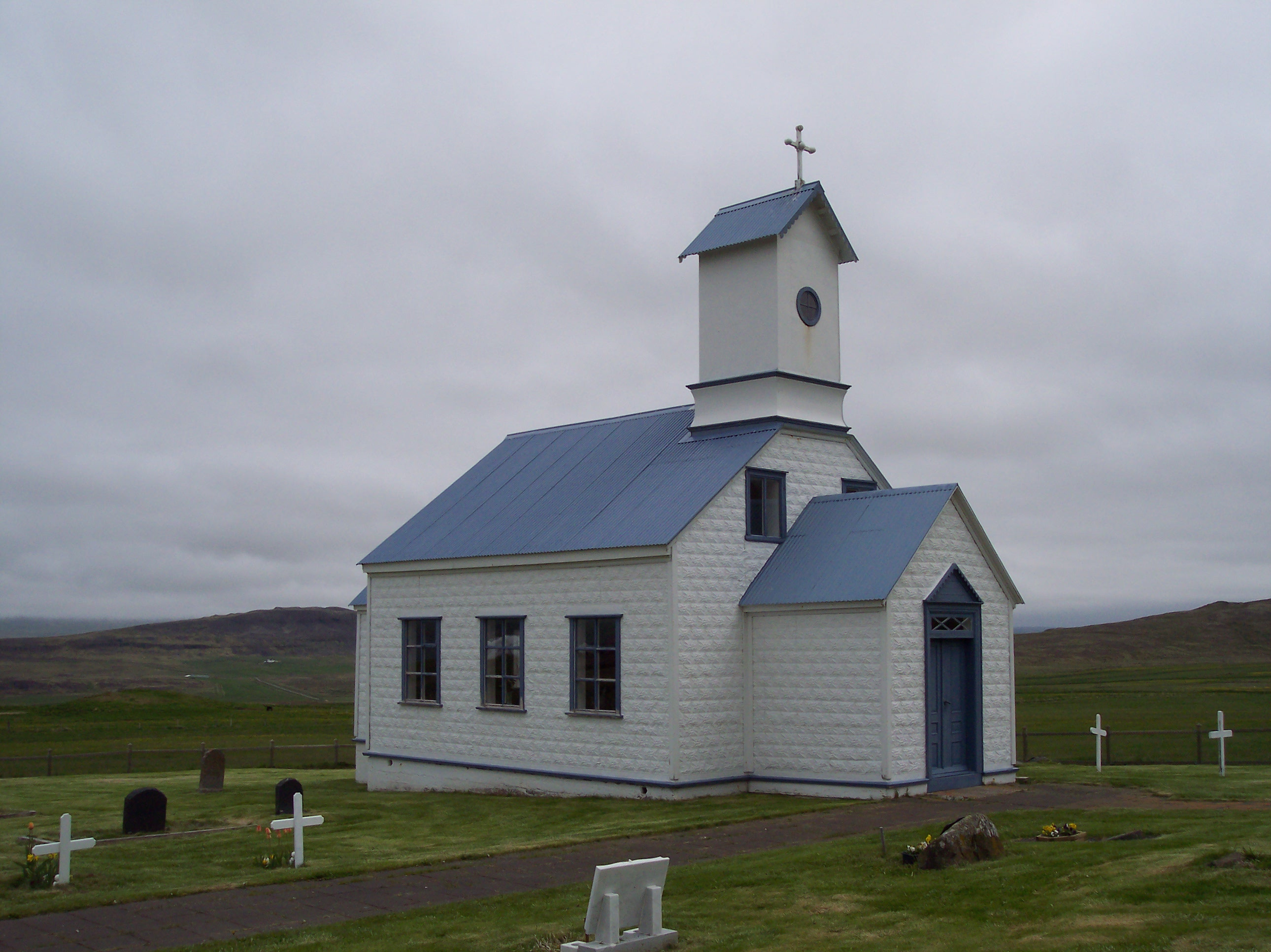
- Breiðabólsstaðarkirkja
- Breiðabólsstaðarkirkja
- 65.4484°N 20.7148°W
- Location: Breiðabólsstaður, Vestur-Húnavatnssýsla, Iceland
- Country: Iceland
- Denomination: Church of Iceland

History
- Founded: c. 1100 (site)

Architecture
- Completed: 1893

Specifications
- Materials: Timber

Breiðabólsstaðarkirkja (Icelandic pronunciation: [ˈpreiːðaˌpo͡ulsˌstaːðarˌcʰɪr̥cja]) is a Lutheran church at Breiðabólsstaður in Vestur-Húnavatnssýsla, Iceland.

The present church was built on timber in 1893, although the site dates back to around c. 1100. Hafliði Másson lived at Breiðabólstaður c. 1100. Jón Arason (1484–1550) was linked to the church in the 16th century.
