= Norðurá (Borgarfjörður) =

River in Iceland

Coordinates: 64°39′N 21°39′W

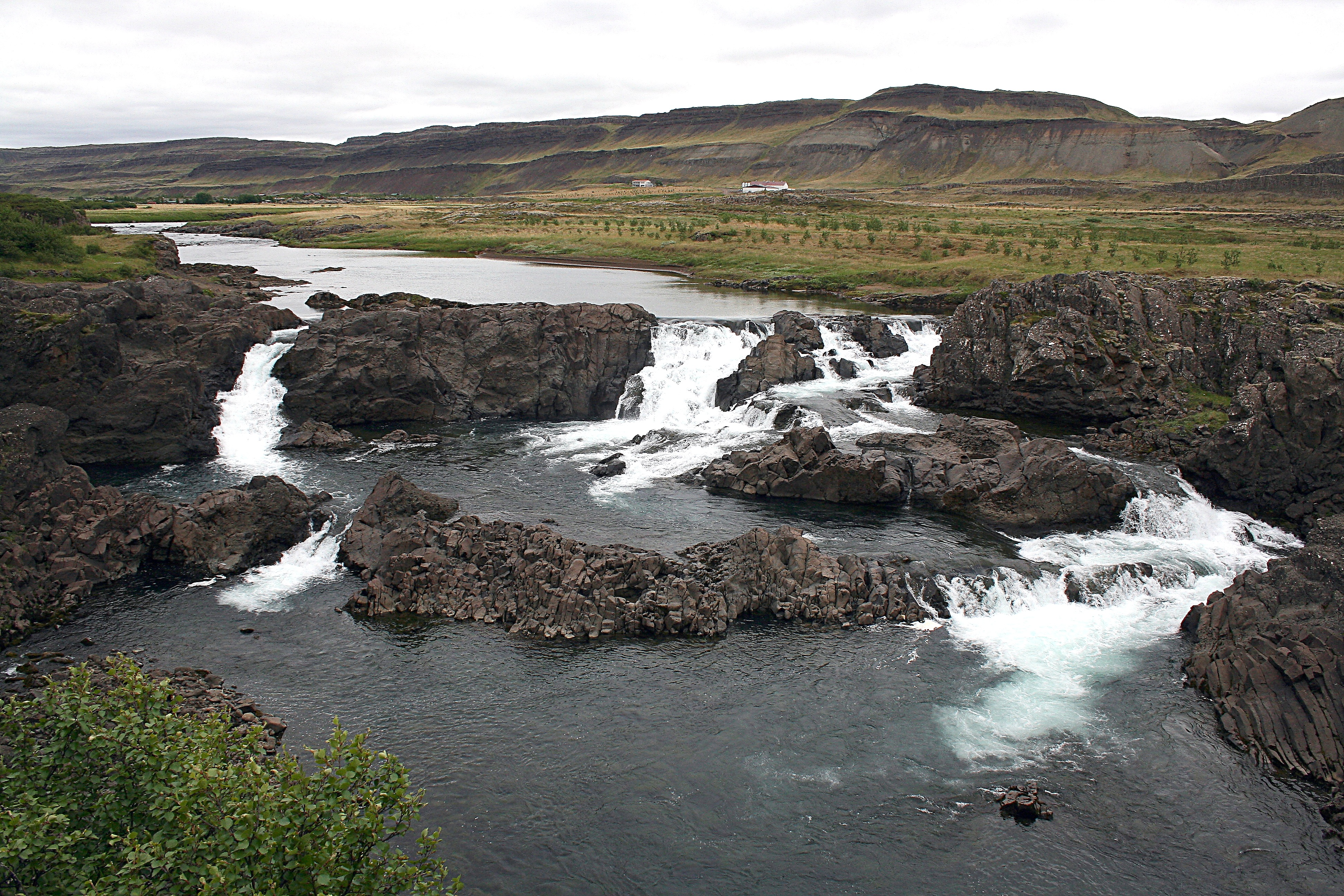
Norðurá river with waterfall Glanni

Norðurá (Icelandic pronunciation: [ˈnɔrðʏrˌauː], "north river") is a river that runs through the Borgarfjörður region in central west Iceland. It is a tributary of the Hvítá. Its origins are in Lake Holtavörðuvatn at 326 m altitude.

The river is known for salmon fishing.
