= Glaumbær =

- Town
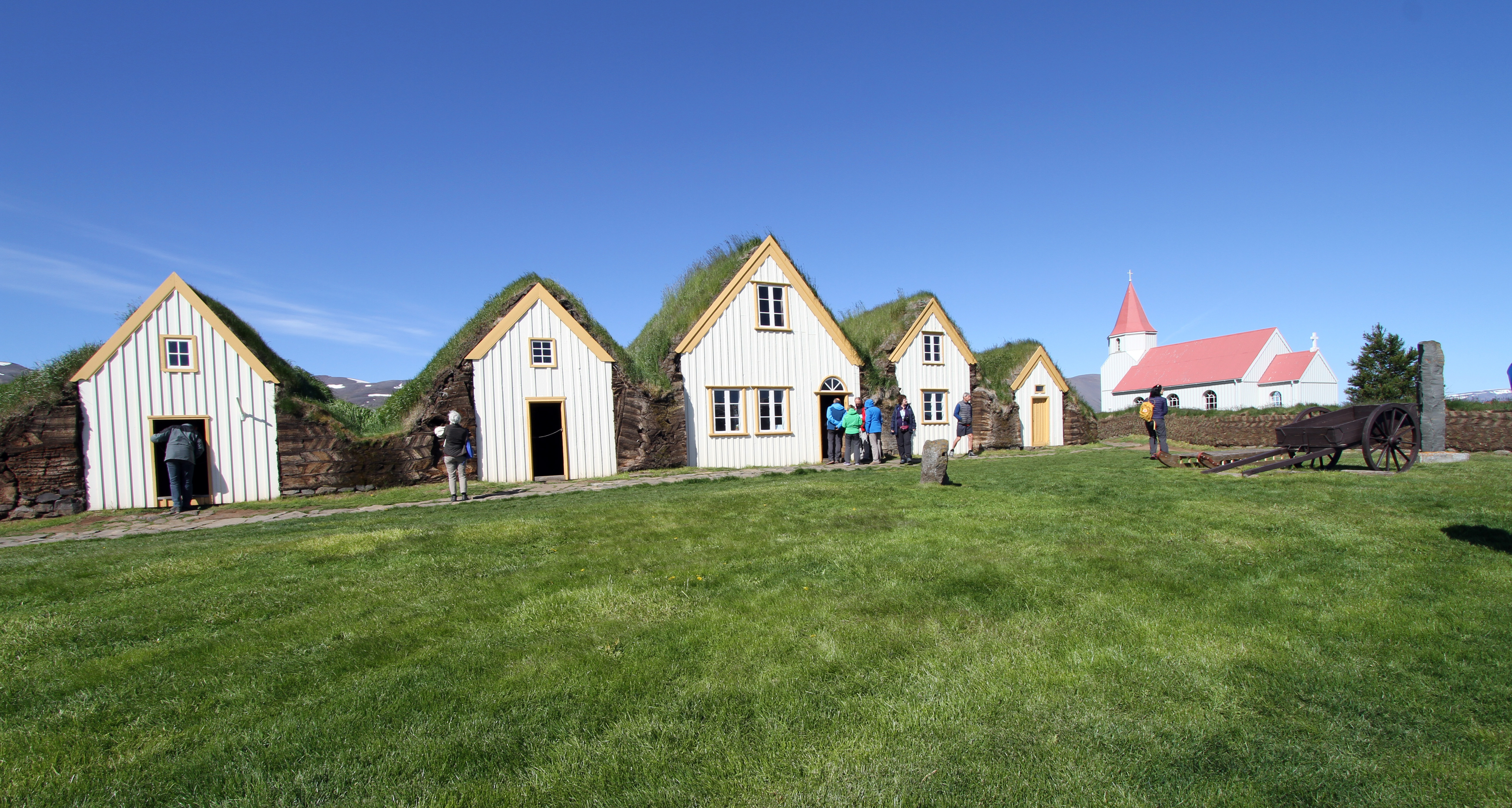
- Turf houses in Glaumbær
- Interactive map of Glaumbær
- Coordinates: 65°36′42.8″N 19°30′26.3″W
- Country: Iceland
- County: Skagafjörður
- Founded by: Þorfinnur "karlsefni" and Guðríður Þorbjarnardóttir

Glaumbær is an Icelandic town and church site in the middle of Langholt, west of Héraðsvötn in Skagafjörður, formerly a part of the rural municipality Seyluhreppur. It is now home to the Skagafjörður Folk Museum.

== History ==
The Glaumbær settlement has been inhabited since the beginning of Iceland's history. The explorer Þorfinnur Karlsefni and his wife, Guðríður Þorbjarnardóttir, lived in Reynistaður before they came from Vinland and bought the land that became Glaumbær. In the 11th century, their son, Snorri Þorfinnsson, who was said to have been born in Vinland, lived there. In the Saga of the Greenlanders, it says that he had the first church built in Glaumbær while his mother Guðríður traveled south. The church at Glaumbær was dedicated to John the Baptist during the Catholic era. The Saga says that Guðríður became the anchoress of Glaumbær after she returned from her trip to the south.

Many well-known leaders lived in Glaumbær during this era. Among them was the local magistrate Hrafn Oddsson, his son Jón "Korpur" (Jón the Raven) and his grandson Hrafn (Rafn) Jónsson, known as Hrafn of Glaumbær (the Raven of Glaumbær). Hrafn invited 360 people to his daughter's wedding reception in Glaumbær in 1360. Soffía, the daughter of Loftur "ríki" Guttormsson (Loftur the Rich), and her son Þorleifur Árnason lived in Glaumbær. His son, Teitur "ríki" Þorleifsson (Teitur the Rich) (died 1537), had many disputes with Gottskálk "grimmi" Nikulásson (Gottskálk the Cruel), the bishop of Hólar, and many chieftains in the earlier part of the 16th century to whom he lost almost all his wealth and power.

Archaeologists in Glaumbær have uncovered remnants of pavilions in the wedding grounds.

== Priests and the Church ==
According to the Catholic church's cartularies, there were two priests in Glaumbær, the household priest and the vicar. A short while before the Reformation, Jón Arason granted the land to Hólastóll and made it into a rectory; priests have been in Glaumbær since. Glaumbær was long considered to be the best paying position in the priesthood in Skagafjörður and many priests served there for a long time. One of the best known is Gottskálk Jónsson (1524–1590), who served as the priest in Glaumbær from 1554 on. He was a scholar and his writings include the Gottskálk Annals and Sópdyngja, which is one of the oldest and most significant pieces of Icelandic writing. Another of Glaumbær's well-known priests was Grímúlfur Illugason (1697–1784), who served there from 1727 until he died. He was known to be skilled in magic and there are various folk tales surrounding him.

Glaumbær's present church was built in 1926 after the wooden church building that was there was destroyed in a ferocious storm. The new church's walls have panels made from the pulpit that was thought to be built in 1685. The pulpit was sold at auction in 1930 and its panels were used as a weight for hay for some years before they were salvaged.

Glaumbær's churchyard houses Miklabæjar-Solveig's grave; her bones were buried there until 1937.

== Skagafjörður Folk Museum ==
The Skagafjörður Folk Museum, which acquired the Glaumbær turf houses, was founded on May 29, 1948 and opened its doors on June 15, 1952. The museum's turf houses contain many items; most are tools related to domestic life and techniques used in an earlier era. The complex consists of thirteen turf houses, six with front-facing gables. The site is unique among Icelandic turf farms insofar as very small stones are used in the walls in a way that is rarely found in the municipality of Glaumbær.

== Gallery ==
Glaumbær

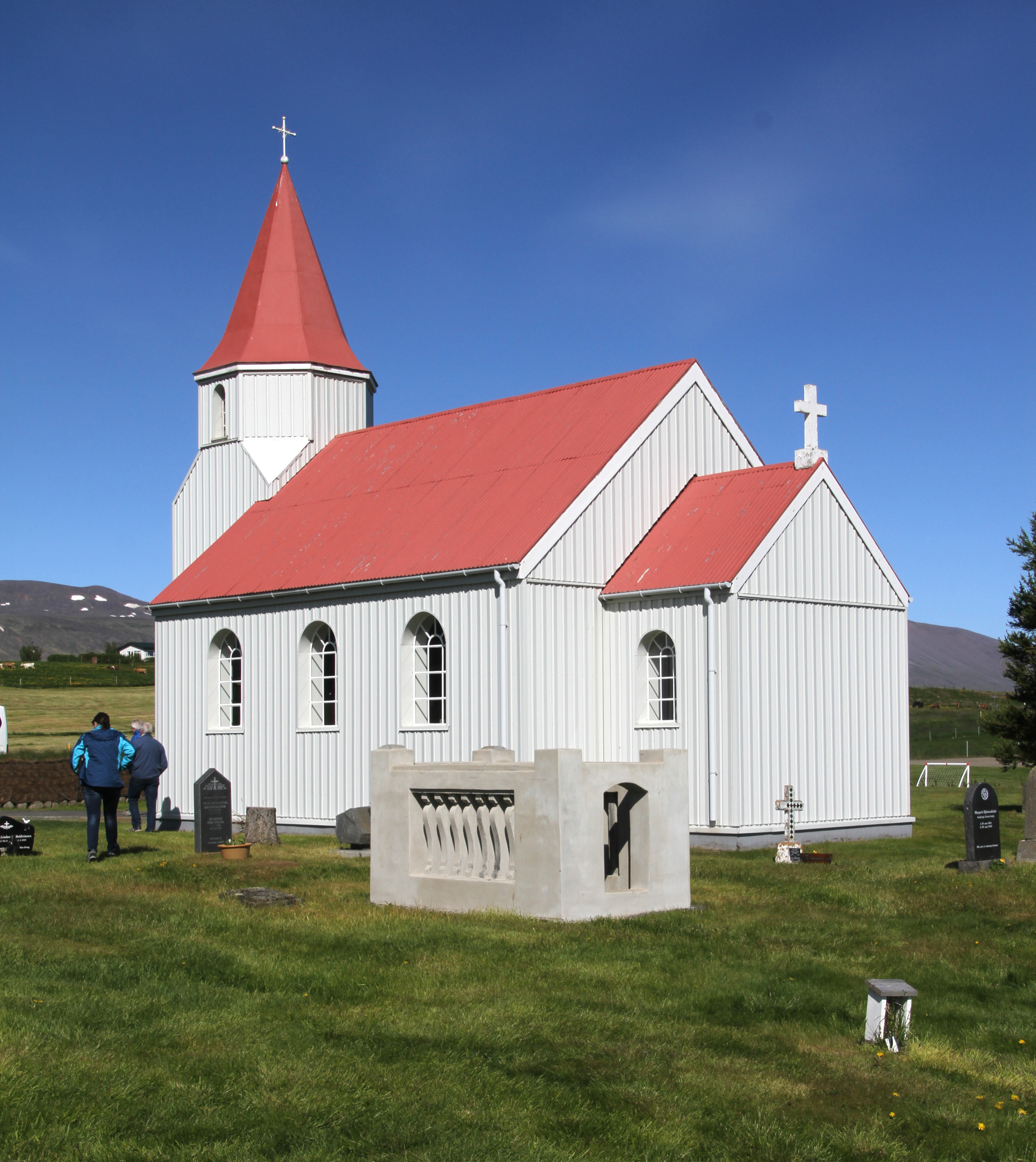

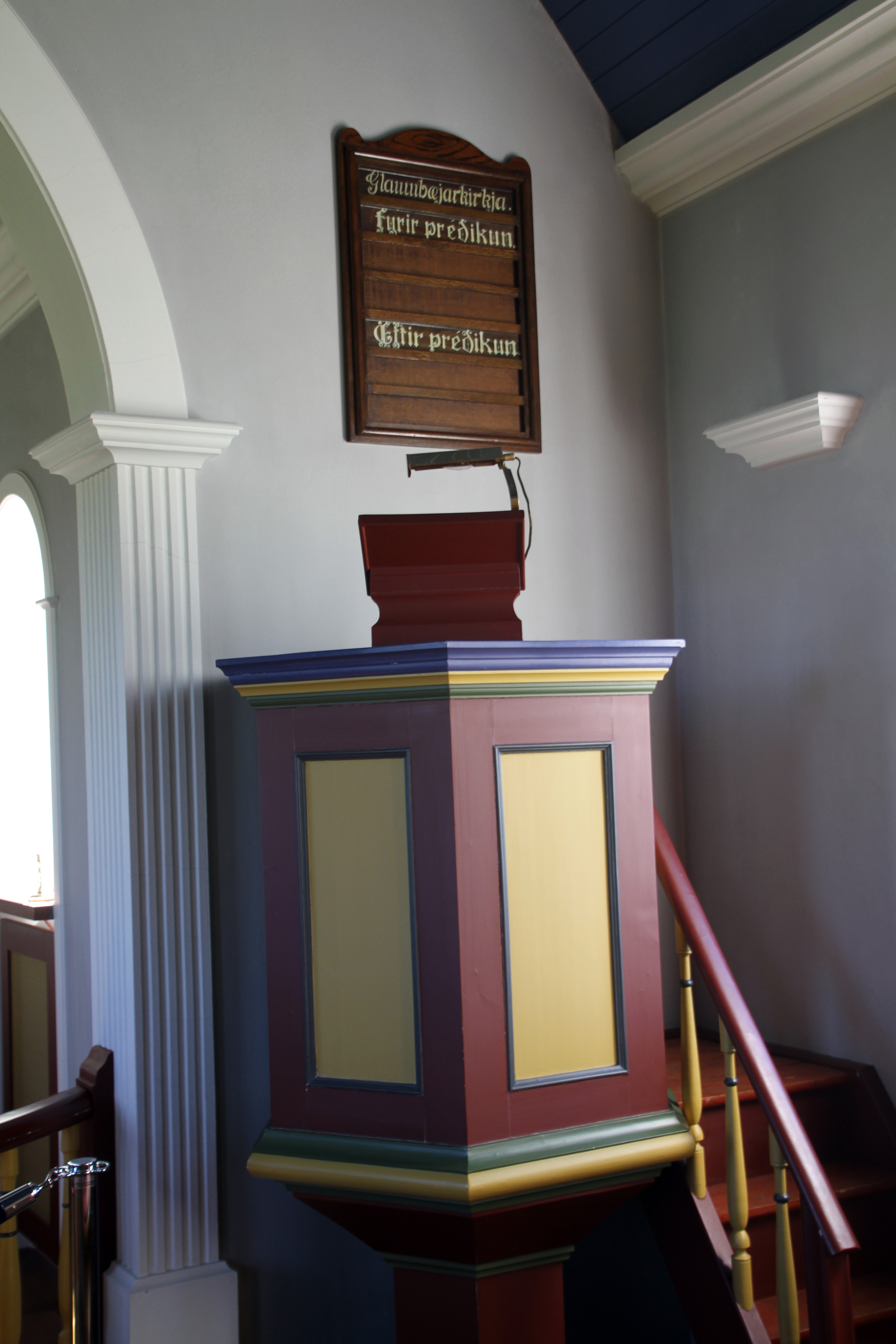

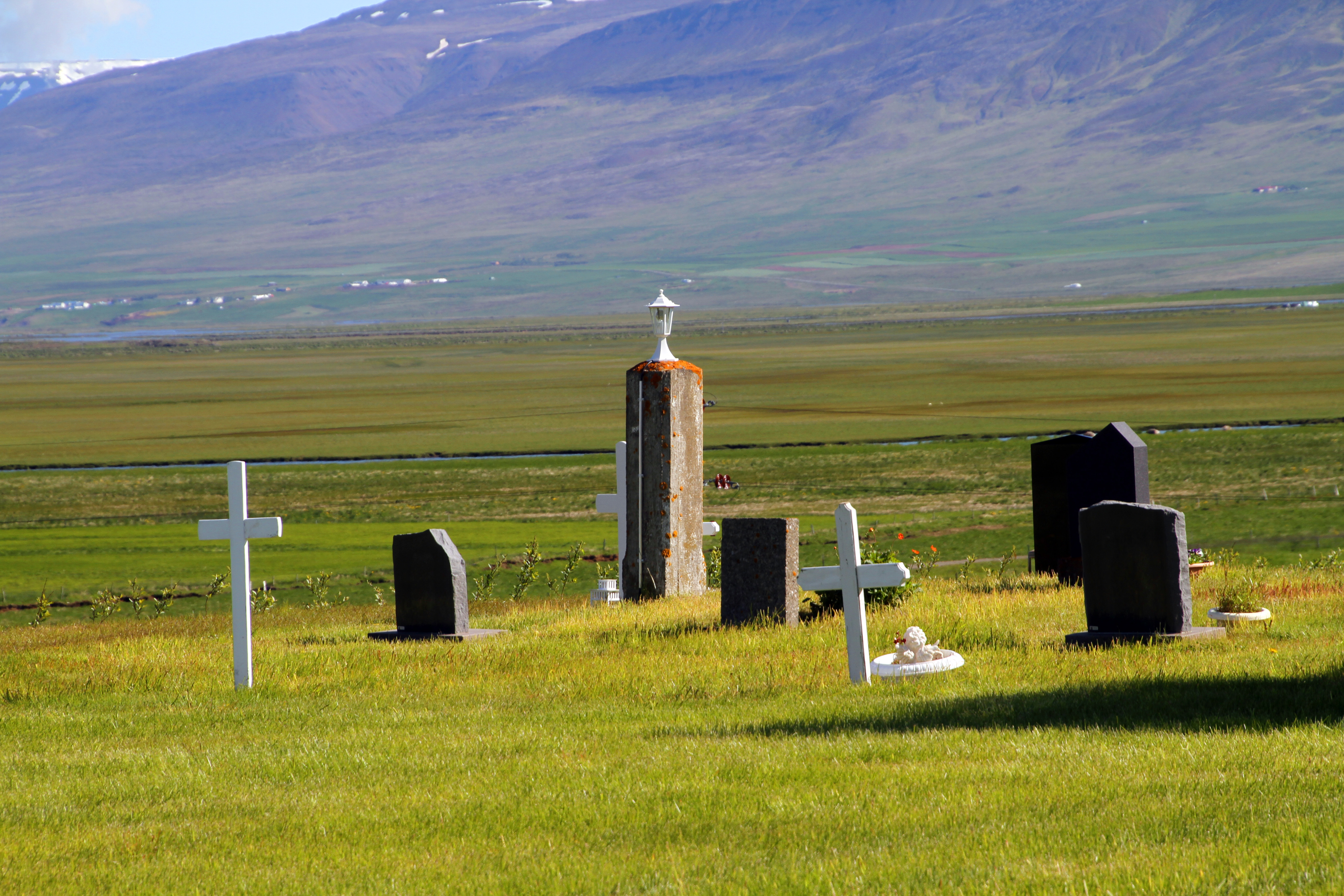

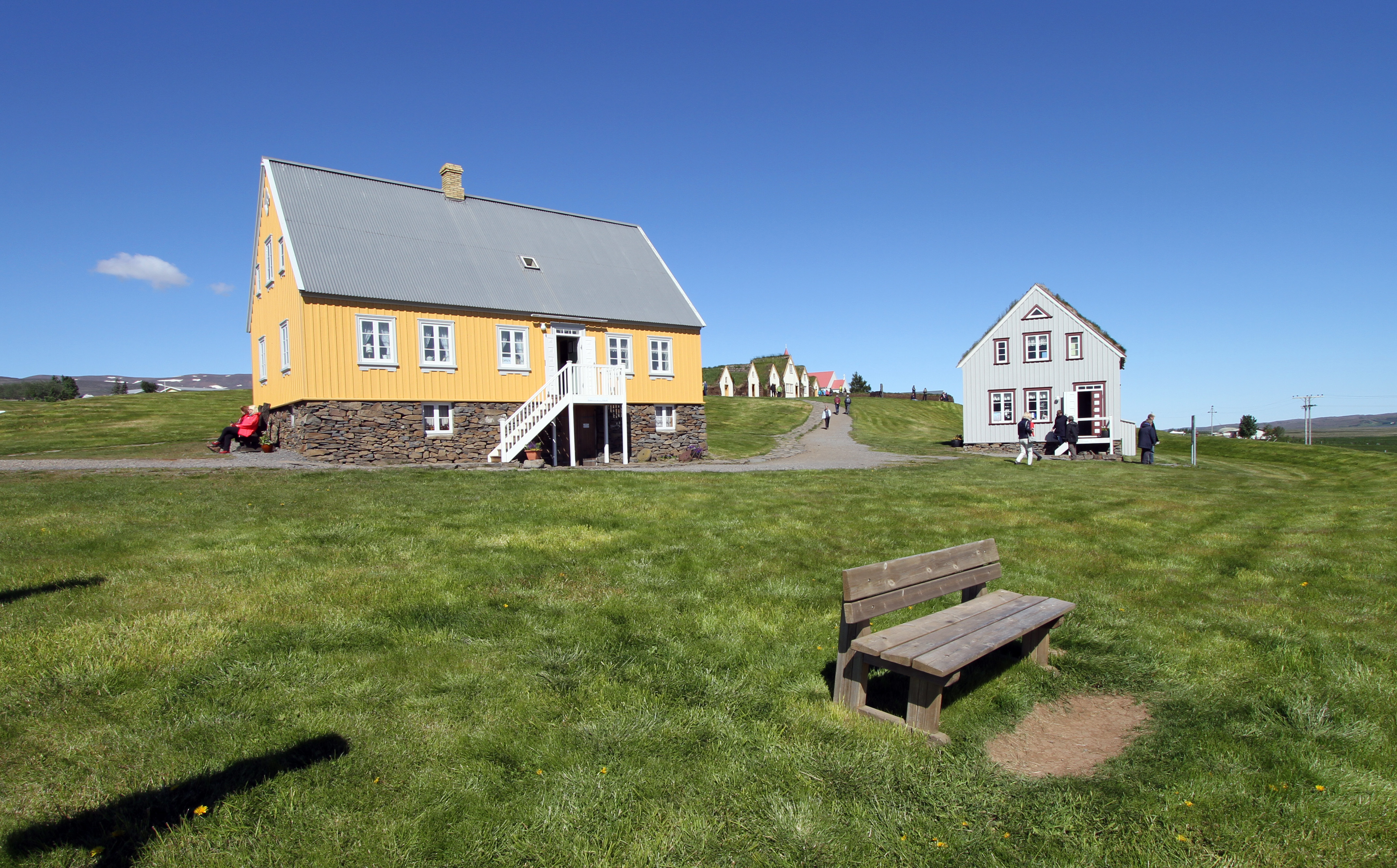

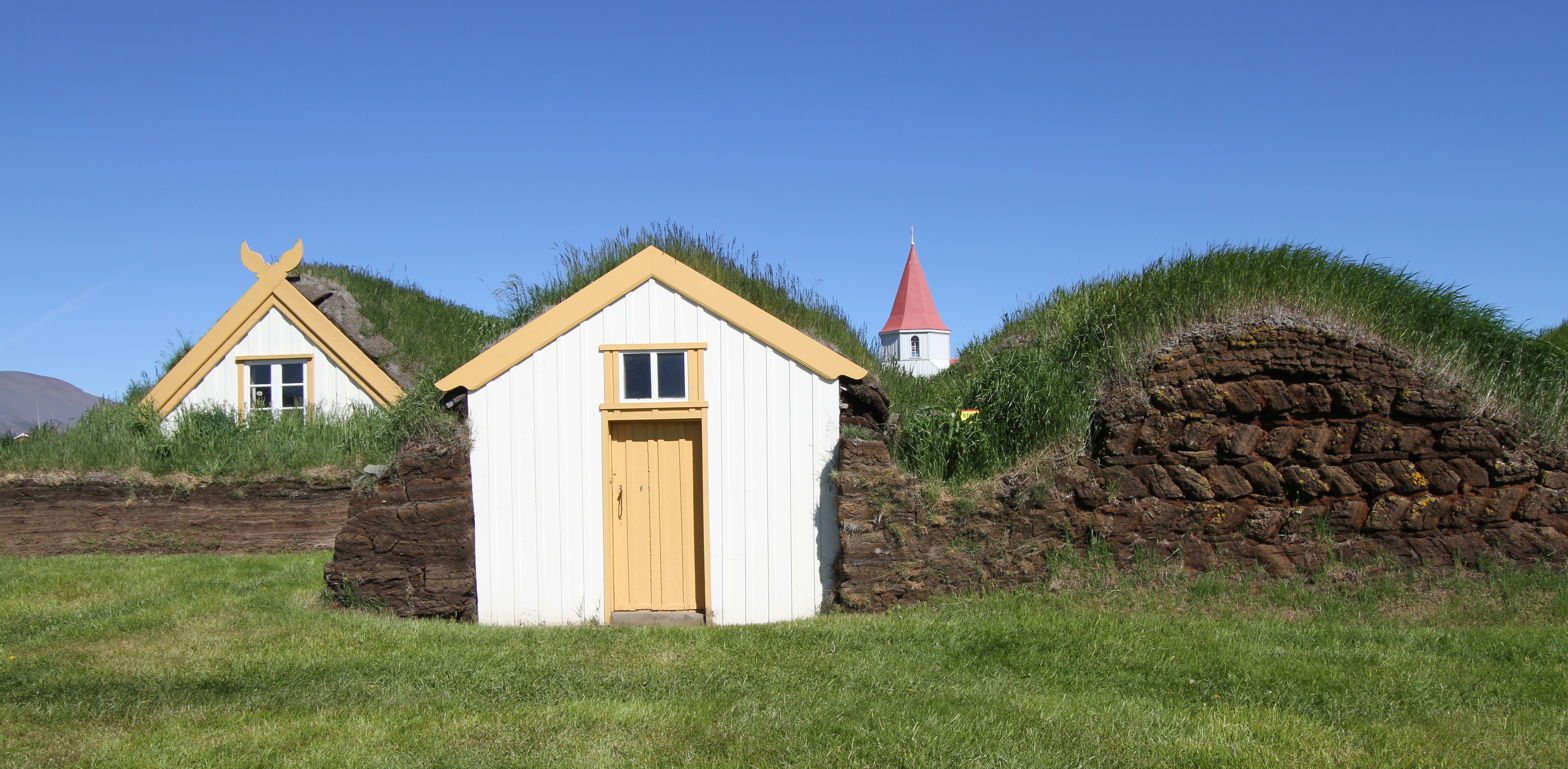

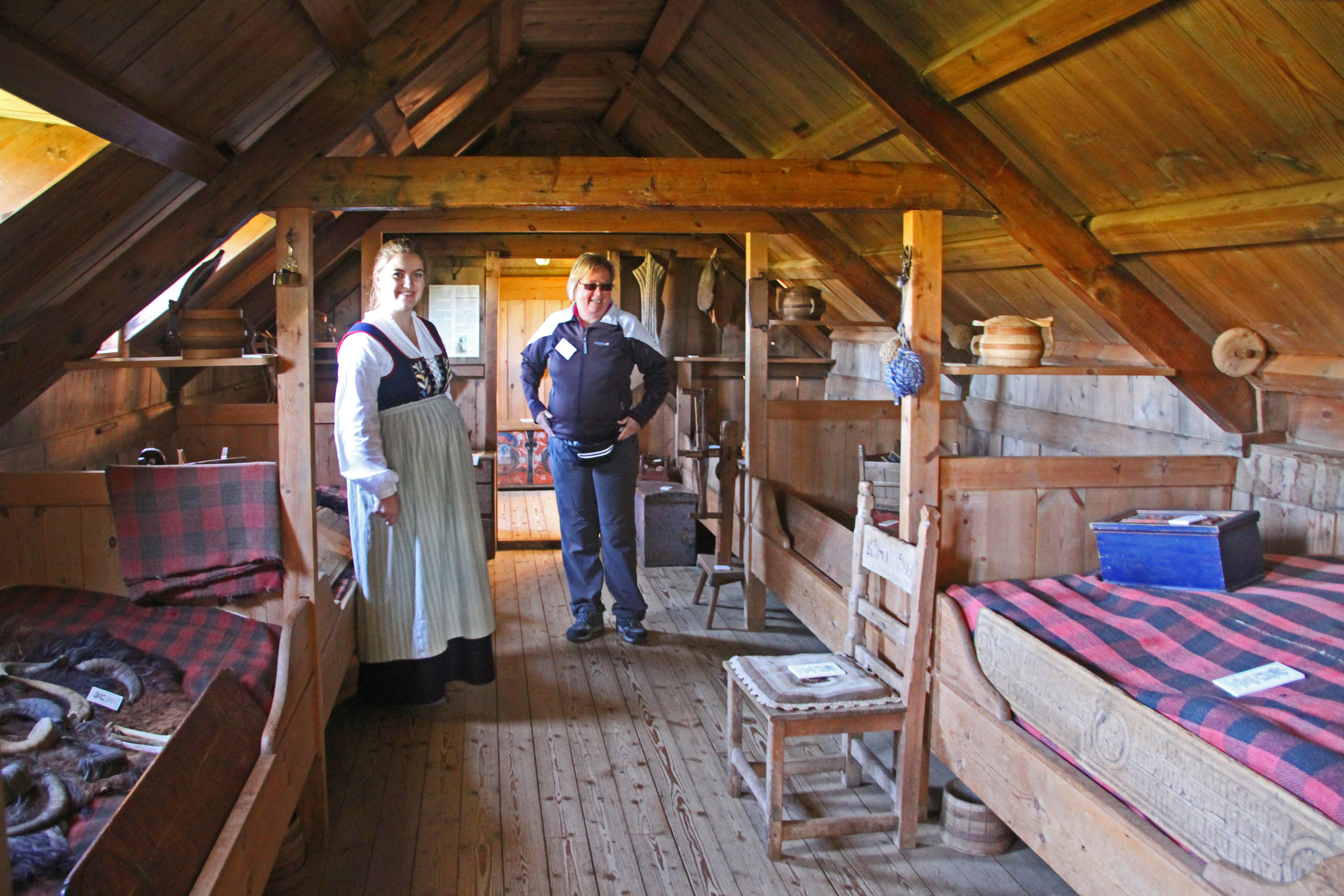

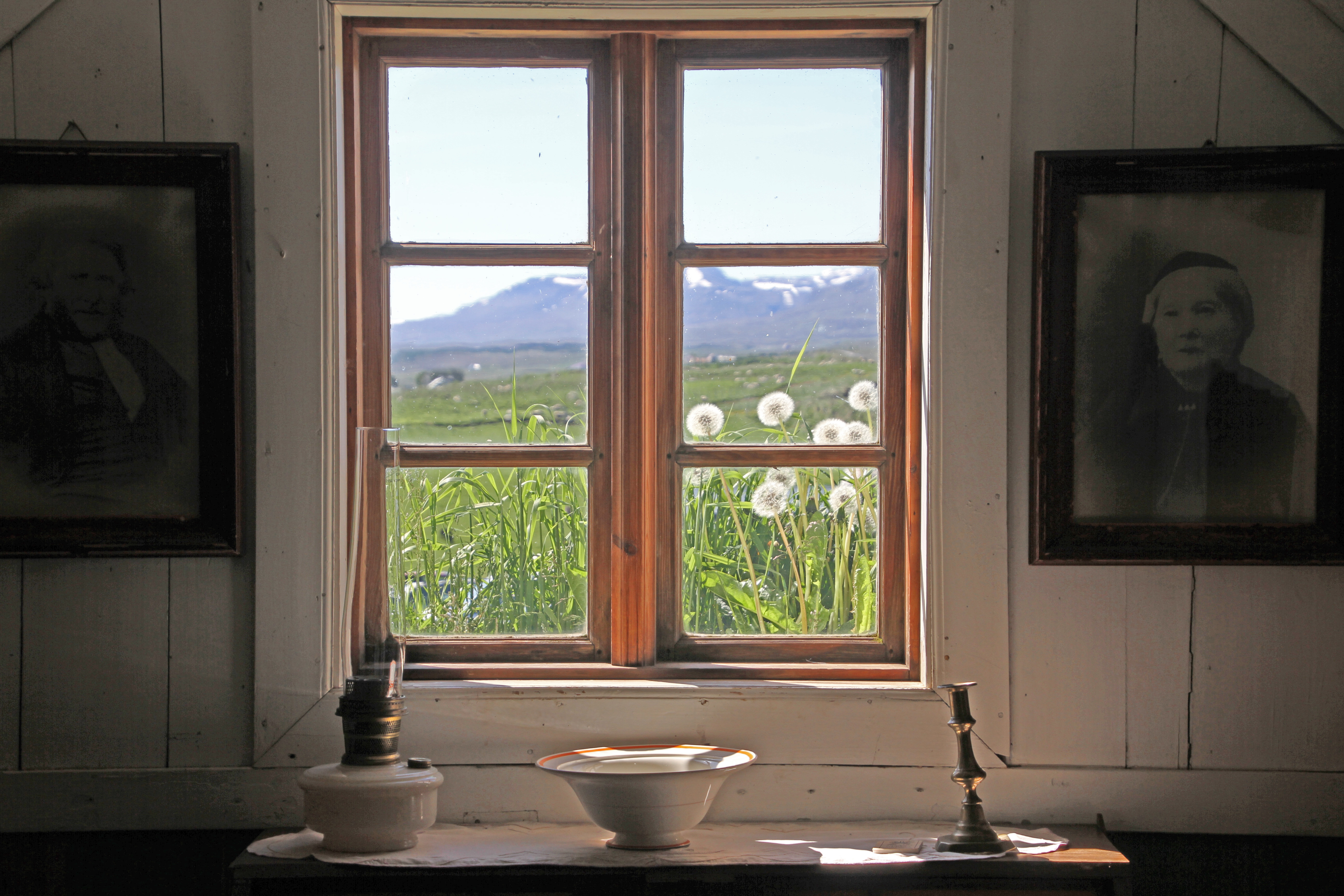
