= Víðimýri =

Farm in Skagafjörður, Iceland

- Estate
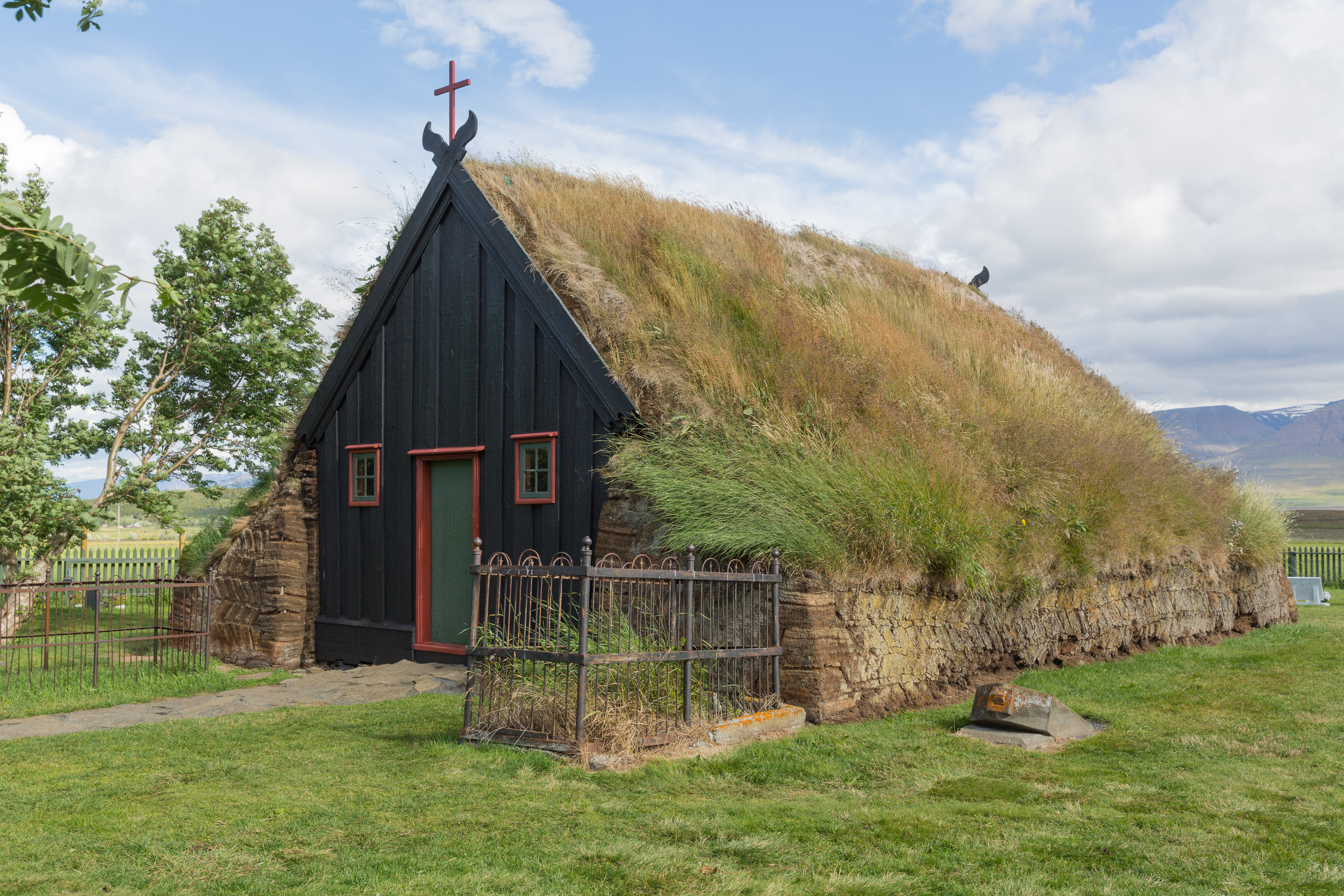
- Víðimýri church
- Interactive map of Víðimýri
- Country: Iceland
- County: Skagafjörður (municipality)

Víðimýri is an estate in Skagafjörður, Iceland south of Varmahlíð, which overlooks it. The area was previously a part of Seyluhreppur. The estate used to be a manor and was, at the end of the 12th century and during the 13th century, the residence of the region's chieftains from the Ásbirningar family clan, from Kolbeinn Tumason to Kálfur, the son of Brandur Kolbeinsson, who was known to live there in 1262. By the 17th and 18th centuries, the estate had long been the residence of the local sheriff. Víðimýri has now been divided into eight or nine independent holdings.

== History ==
According to the Sturlunga saga, Snorri Sturluson had a fort made in Víðimýri around 1220, and it was allegedly possible to see its remnants into the 20th century, when they were leveled. There has probably been a church in Víðimýri since around the time Iceland converted to Christianity. The most well-known priest there in centuries past was Guðmundur Arason, later a bishop. The current church was built in 1834.

In the early 20th century, both parishioners and church authorities attempted to get the farmer at Víðimýri, Steingrím Arason, to tear down the church and build a new one, but he did not want to. In 1934, the National Museum of Iceland bought the church. Since then, it has had major improvements made to it. It is considered an excellent example of old Icelandic construction techniques. The church is made from turf and wood and was designed by member of Parliament Jón Samsonarson who oversaw its construction.
