= Saurbæjarkirkja =

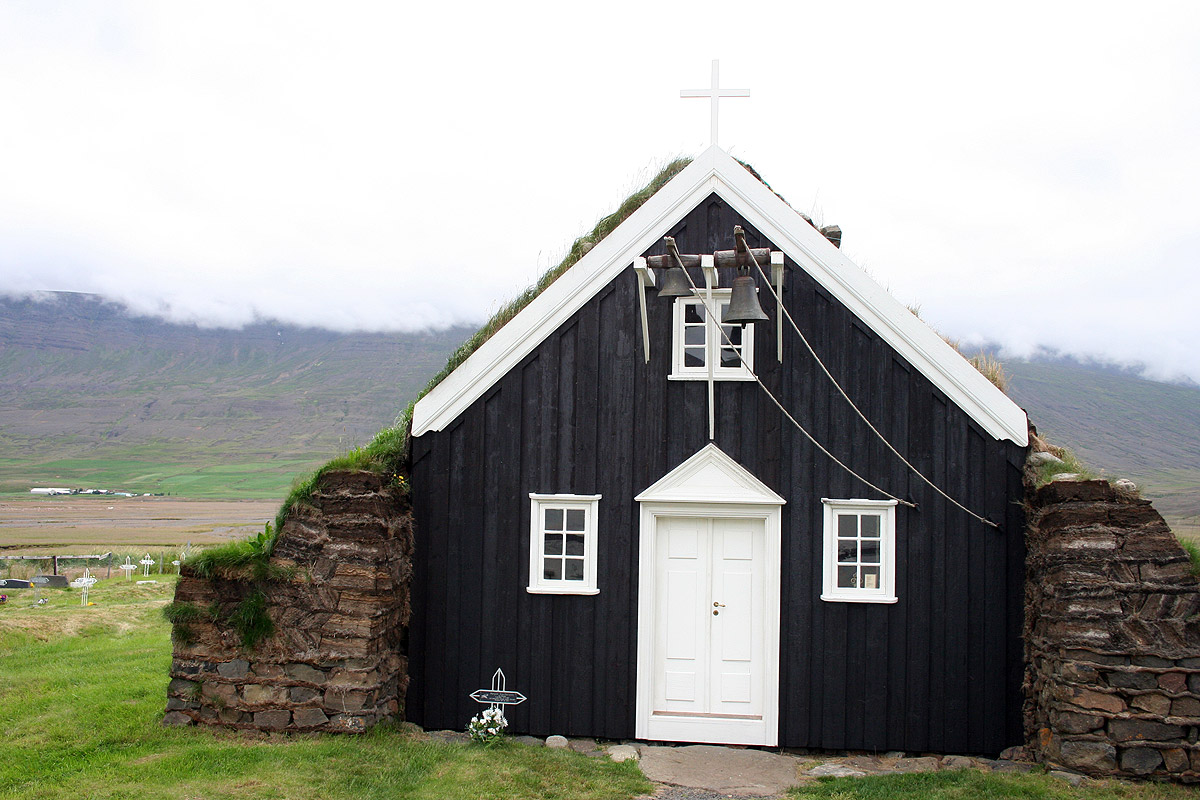
- Saurbæjarkirkja (front view)
- Saurbæjarkirkja
- 65.4471°N 18.2105°W
- Location: Eyjafjörður
- Country: Iceland

Architecture
- Functional status: Museum
- Architect: Olaf Briem
- Architectural type: Church (turf church)
- Style: Vernacular
- Completed: 1858

Specifications
- Materials: Turf, stone, wood

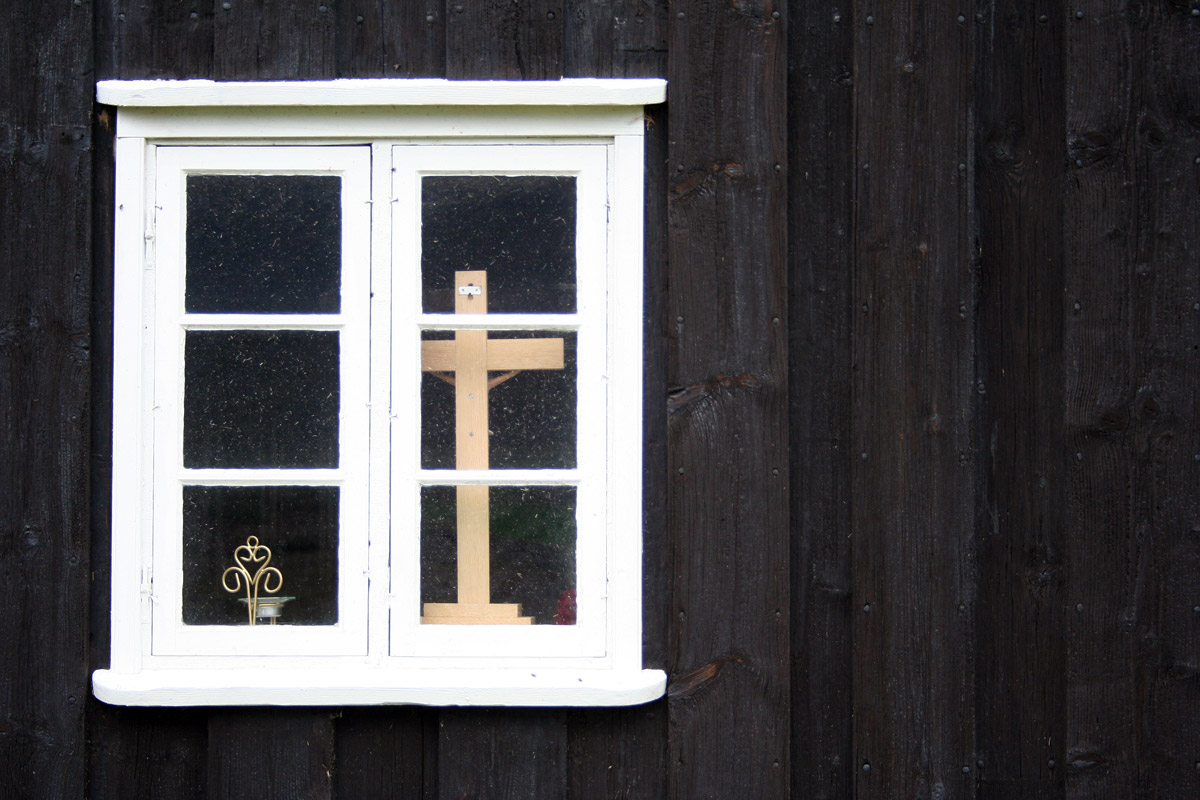
Window of Saurbæjarkirkja

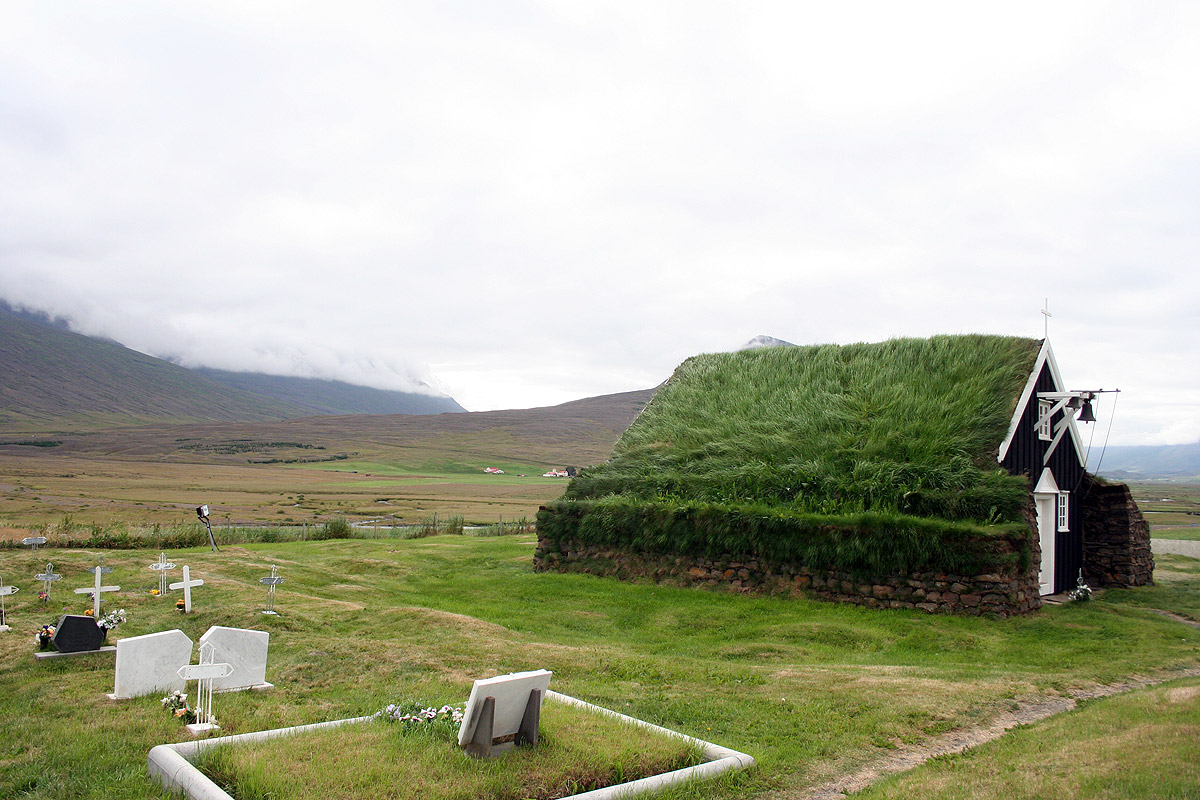
Saurbæjarkirkja church cemetery and building

Saurbæjarkirkja (Icelandic pronunciation: [ˈsœyrˌpaiːjarˌcʰɪr̥ca]) is a church in the Eyjafjörður region of Iceland. It is located about 26 kilometres (16 mi) south of Akureyri.

Saurbæjarkirkja church has thick turf and stone walls on the outside for protection against the weather, and turf on the roof. It was built in 1858 by Olaf Briem (1808-59), who studied carpentry in Copenhagen. It is one of only six turf churches still extant in Iceland. Most churches in Iceland were built of this material until well into the 19th century. Inside, the church has a wooden frame construction. Churches of this type had no tower, and the bells usually hung from the front gable. Saurbæjarkirkja church is now under care of the National Museum of Iceland (Icelandic: Þjóðminjasafn Íslands).
