= Vallhólmur =

Flatland area in the middle of Skagafjörður, Iceland

- District
- Interactive map of Vallhólmur
- Country: Iceland
- County: Skagafjörður (municipality)
- Boroughs: Farms: Syðra-Vallholt, Ytra-Vallholt, Vellir, Langamýri

Vallhólmur, also called Hólmurinn, is a flatland area in the middle of Skagafjörður, Iceland, formed from sediment from the Héraðsvötn river—it is in fact an old seabed. The area's eastern boundary is the Héraðsvötn and Húseyjarkvísl, and its western is Vindheimamelar. Vallhólmur becomes the Eylendið plain to the north, but the name Eylendið sometimes encompasses both areas.

The region is flat and level except for two hills that rise up from the plain, Skiphóll and Vallholt. There are two farms with the same name, Syðra- and Ytra-Vallholt (South and Far Vallholt), up against the back of Vallholt, and a short distance from Vallalaug spring, which is often mentioned in the Sturlunga saga and other sources from that era. Other farms in Vallhólmur are Vellir and Langamýri. A few of the farms in eastern Vallhólmur, which are now abandoned, belonged to Akrahreppur. This suggests that the Héraðsvötn previously ran further west, at least intermittently.

Vallhólmur is grassy and a grass pellet plant operated there for years, but it has since ceased operations. Vallhólmur also has what is considered an excellent race track in Vindheimamelar.

== Vindheimamelar ==
Vindheimamelar is a horse riding area on the north end of Reykjatunga í Tungusveit (Reykjatunga in Tungusveit) located on the property of Vindheimar. Just north of the end of a gravel plain, Skiphóll mound—which has been described as being shaped like a capsized boat—rises from the Vallhólmur flatland. The Svartá river, whose name changes to Húseyjarkvísl past Reykjatunga, runs along the west of the plain.

The Stígandi and Léttfeti Riding Clubs established a race track in the gravel in Vindheimamelar in 1969 and they have held equestrian competitions in Vallabakkar in Vallhólmur. Since then, a facility has been built for holding competitions. Regional and national riding tournaments, as well as district tournaments, are held there.
