= Ríp =

Farm and church site in Iceland

Ríp Rípur
- Farm and Church Site
- Interactive map of Ríp
- Coordinates: 65°40′14.574″N 19°26′41.950″W
- Country: Iceland
- County: Skagafjörður (municipality)
- Time zone: UTC+0

Ríp (which sometimes used to be called Rípur) is a farm and church site in the southeast of Hegranes in Skagafjörður, Iceland. Ríp is an old word that can be translated to "cliff" or "ridge of a hill." Ribe in Jutland, Denmark has an analogous name.

The first mention of a church in Ríp was in 1318 and there was a rectory there from 1575 to 1907. The pay for priests in Ríp was considered meager and the priests there were poorer than their counterparts in other towns. The Icelandic ballad poet Hannes Bjarnason was a priest there from 1829 to 1838. After he died, Reverend Jón Reykjalín succeeded him.

The church is now served by a priest who is based in Hólar. The church was built in 1924.
