= Hegranes =

Island in the Héraðsvötn river, Iceland

- Etymology: Icelandic for "heron peninsula"

Geography
- Location: Héraðsvötn
- Coordinates: 65°42′N 19°28′W
- Length: 15 km (9.3 mi)

Administration
- Iceland
- county: Skagafjörður (municipality)

Additional information
- ISO code: is

Hegranes is the name of the peninsula between the branches of the Héraðsvötn river in Skagafjörður, Iceland. Although Hegranes is called a peninsula (its name is derived from hegri "heron" and nes "peninsula"), it is actually an island about 15 kilometers long with a fairly tall, rocky headland covered in vegetation. Héraðsvötn's western estuary hews closely to the west side of the peninsula, but there is a large, sandy area before the peninsula reaches the eastern estuary. Off the southern end of the peninsula, there is a delta called Austara-Eylendið. It has diverse avian life and vegetation and is home to a natural heritage site.

== History ==
Hegranes was previously its own rural district, or hreppur, called Rípurhreppur, which has since become a part of the larger municipality of Skagafjörður.

The region's church is located in Ríp. One of the first women's schools in the country was founded in Ás in Hegranes in fall 1877, but it only stayed open for one year.

In the town of Keldudalur, in Hegranes, there has been extensive progress in archeological excavations. Ruins dating to the 10th to 12th centuries have been unearthed.

According to local folk beliefs, many elves, or 'hidden folk', have settlements in Hegranes. This belief holds some influence over road construction.

== Hegranesþing ==
Hegranesþing refers to spring sessions of parliament during the Icelandic Commonwealth era that were held on the Garður property in Hegranes. The quarterly assembly (fjórðungsþing, an assembly historically held for a quadrant of the country) was also held there. The county had long shared a name with the assembly and was known as Hegranesþing (Hegranes assembly) or Hegranessýsla (Hegranes County). It is centrally located in the region and was ideally located for both land and sea transport, and it is thought that the sea used to reach the slope at the lower edge of the parliament site.

The parliament was around 500 meters away from the farm Garður and there may be several dozen ruins, most of which are probably the remains of camps set up when parliament was in session. Excavations of the cemetery have also uncovered a circular garden that seems to have been in use around the 11th or 12th centuries and may reveal important information about the farm's fence, which was by the parliament grounds.

Hegranesþing appears in several of the sagas, including Grettis saga, which says that the outlaw Grettir arrived at parliament in disguise and was offered full amnesty during the parliamentary session if he was willing to fight Skagafjörður's greatest warriors. However, the most famous event that took place in Hegranesþing is probably when the people of Skagafjörður mobbed Álfur úr Króki (Álfur of Krókur) who was the envoy of the Norwegian king in 1305. It was a difficult fight, but Álfur managed to escape. He was banished to Eyjafjörður, where he died some time later.

The parliament disbanded around the 14th century. The location of the parliament is a protected site, but little research has yet been done there.
