= Svartárdalur =

Valley in Skagafjörður, Iceland

- Long-axis direction: north-south

Naming
- English translation: Black River Valley

Geography
- Country: Iceland
- State/Province: Skagafjörður
- Coordinates: 65°18′44.734″N 19°9′37.609″W
- River: Svartá
- Interactive map of Svartárdalur

Svartárdalur is a valley deeper into the interior of Skagafjörður, Iceland. It was previously a part of Lýtingsstaðahreppur, but now belongs to Skagafjörður County. It is a rather short valley and the Svartá river runs through it. There are few farms there, and some have been abandoned. The homestead Írafell is in the valley.

There is another Svartárdalur and another Svartá on the Húnavatnssýsla side of the mountain and they are occasionally confused because they are so close to each other.
