= Héraðsvötn =

River in Skagafjörður, Iceland

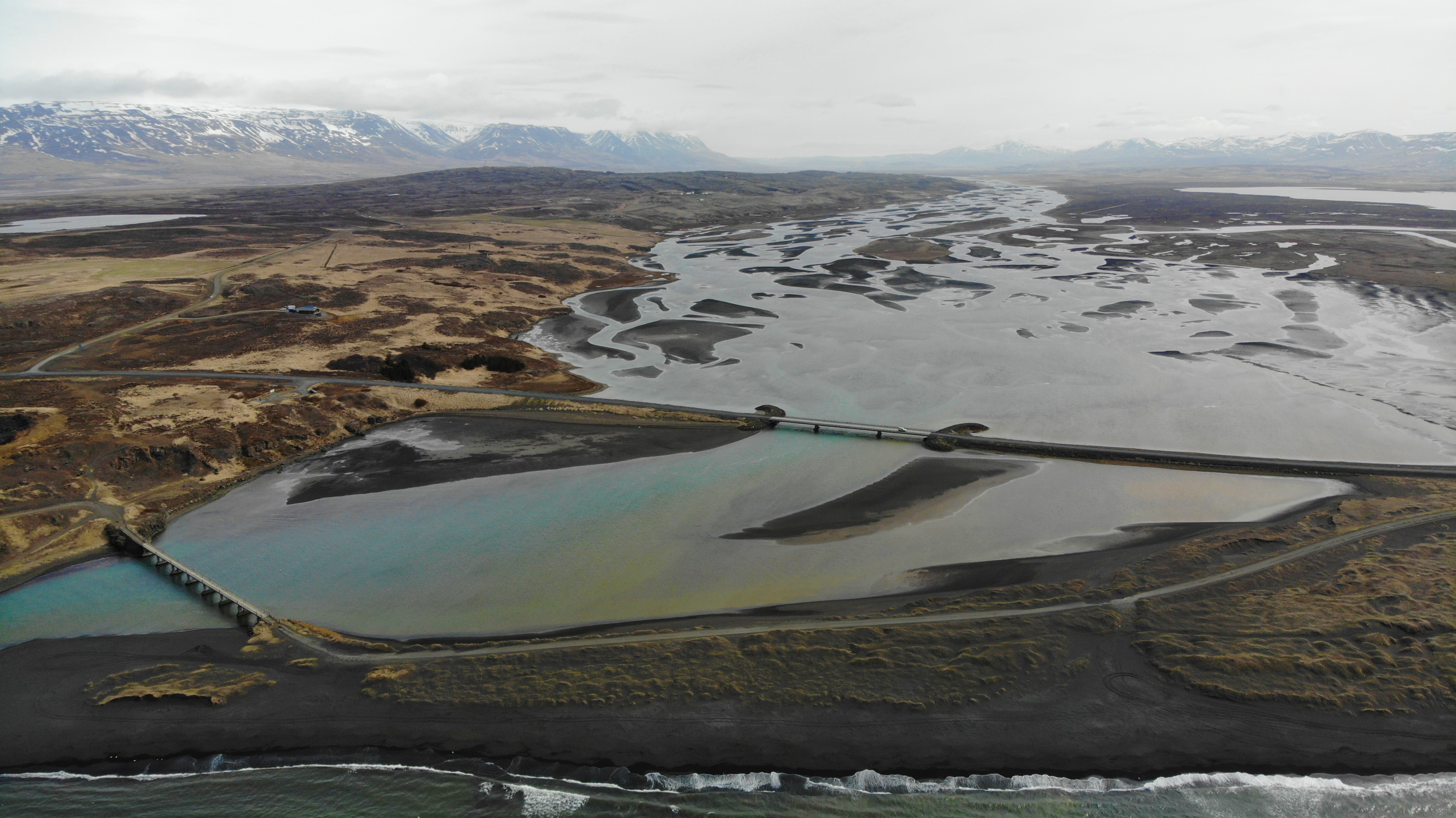
- Mouth of Héraðsvötn

Physical characteristics
- Source
  - coordinates: 65°22′20″N 19°6′30″W
  - elevation: 90 m (300 ft)
- Mouth
  - location: Skagafjörður
  - coordinates: 65°44′55″N 19°33′10″W
- Length: 40 km (25 mi)
- Basin size: 3,650 km^{2} (1,410 sq mi)
- Discharge
  - average: 111 m^{3}/s (3,900 cu ft/s)

Héraðsvötn (Icelandic pronunciation: [ˈçɛːraðsˌvœhtn̥]), whose name is often shortened to Vötn or Vötnin (and was called Jökulsá in previous centuries) is a glacier river in Iceland. It is formed by the confluence of Austari-Jökulsá and Vestari-Jökulsá rivers. The Héraðsvötn is located in Skagafjörður, a municipality in northern Iceland, and it is one of the deadliest watercourses in the country.

The Héraðsvötn is formed by the confluence of multiple rivers that come together at just past the farm Tunguháls, where the eastern and western branches of the Jökulsá meet. The Norður river, Húseyjarkvísl, and many smaller rivers also flow into it. In the middle of Blönduhlíð, Héraðsvötn splits into two forks that flow to the sea on either side of Hegranes. These forks are referred to as the Western-Héraðsvötn and Eastern-Héraðsvötn (Vestari-Héraðsvötn and Austari-Héraðsvötn, respectively).

In a 1966 article by Hallgrímur Jónasson, the Héraðsvötn was described as follows:

To the south, they it [the Héraðsvötn] is formed from two major rivers: the western Jökulsá and the eastern Jökulsá. They converge a little farther down where settlements begin in the two valleys into which they flow, and it was named Héraðsvötn on account of this. Twelve to fifteen kilometers from the sea, it splits into two branches. They flow into the sea on either side of Hegranes, both branches moving similar amounts of water. Where the lake flows into the fjord, they are called the western and eastern estuary.
