= Varmahlíð =

Village in Skagafjörður, Iceland

- Village
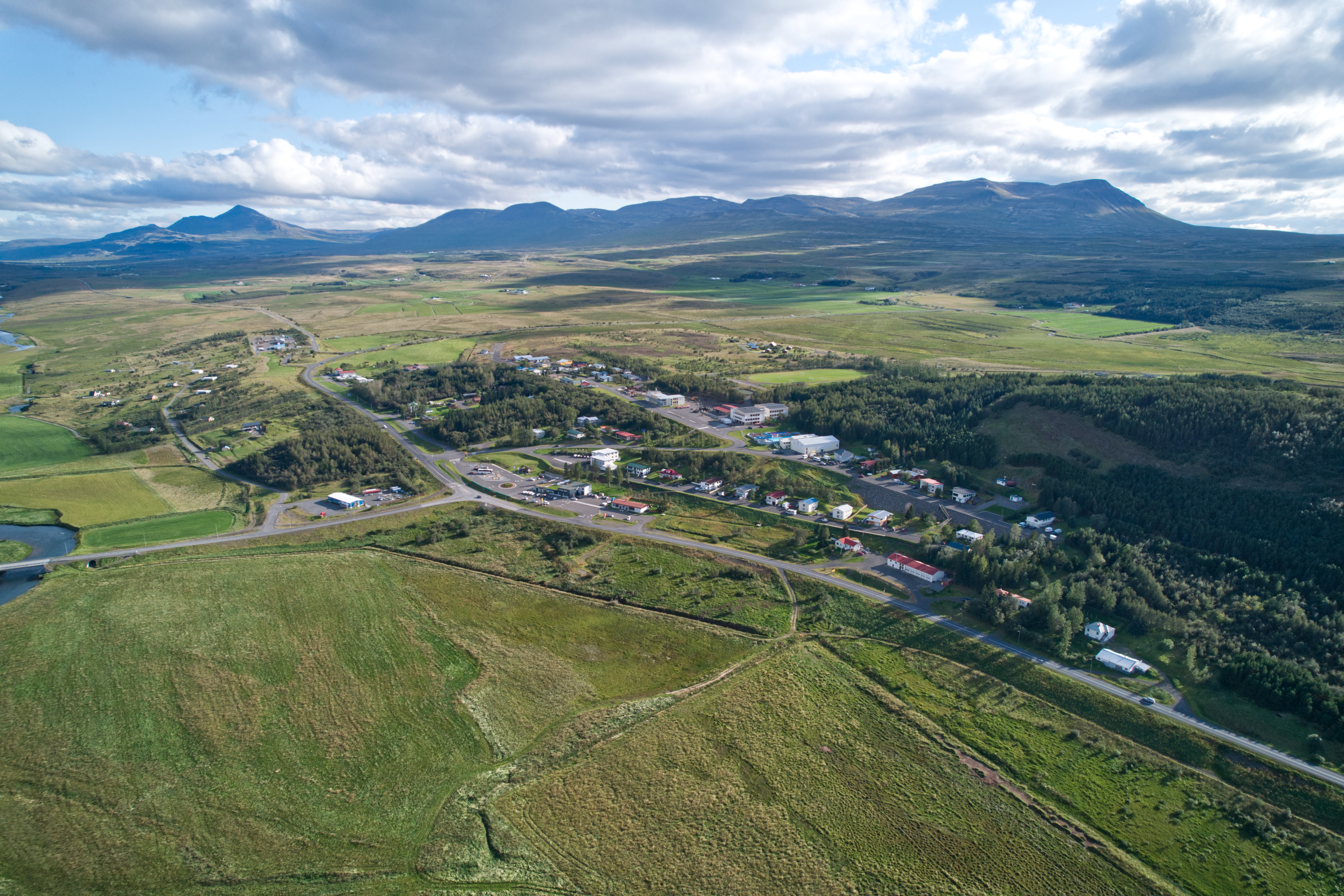

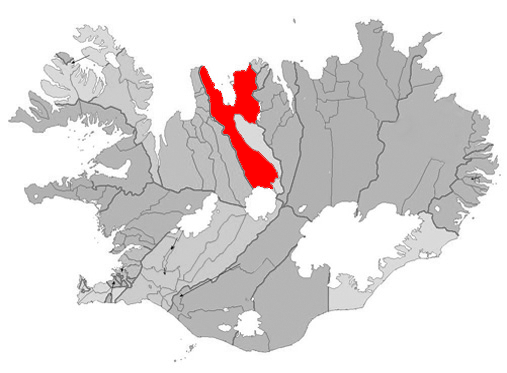
- Location of the Municipality of Skagafjörður

- Location within Iceland
- Coordinates: 65.5525°N 19.4449°W
- Country: Iceland
- Constituency: Northwest Constituency
- Region: Northwestern Region
- Municipality: Skagafjörður

Population (January 2011)
  - Total: 137
- Póstnúmer: 560
- Website: Official website

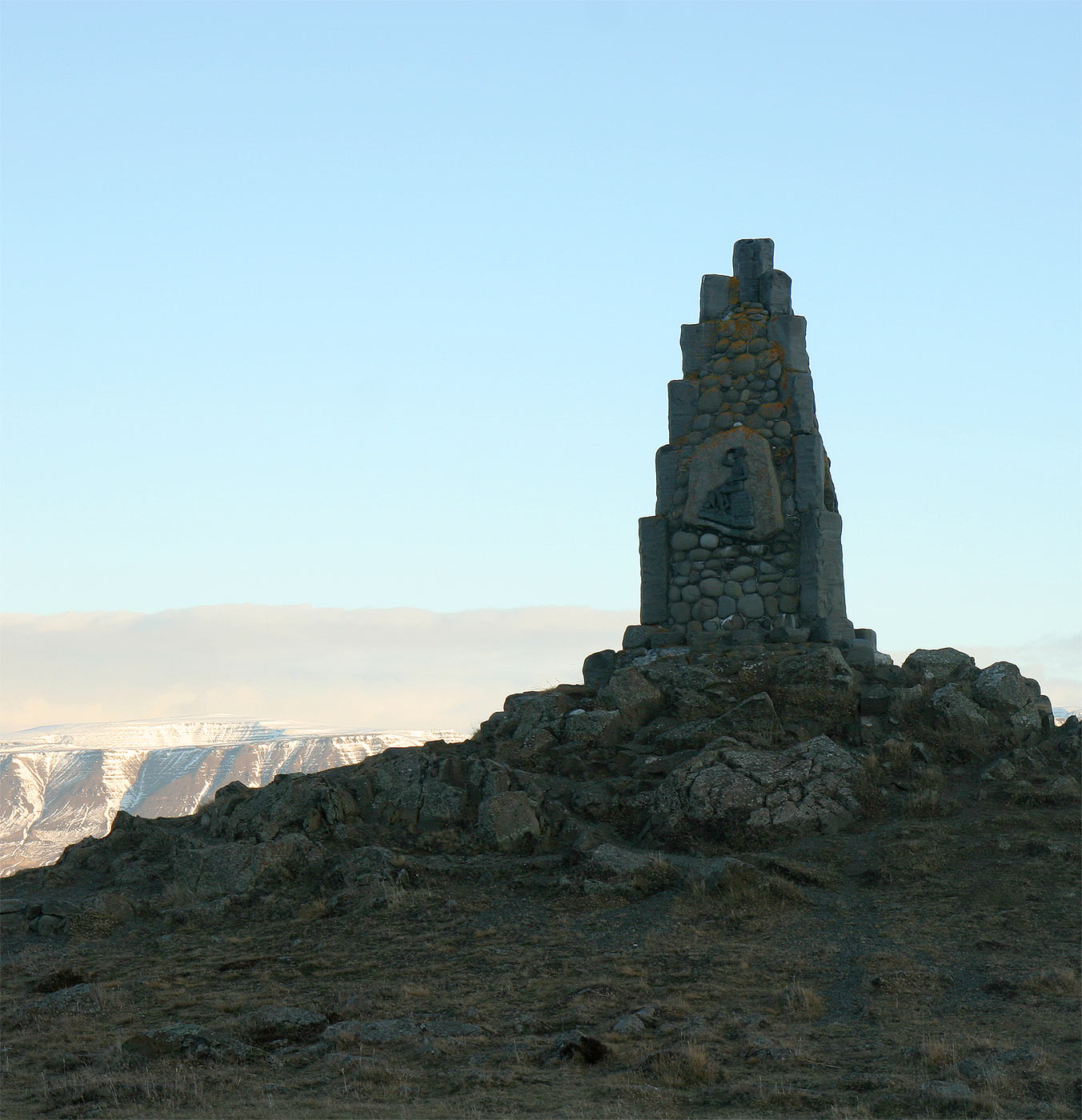
Stephan Stephansson monument at Vatnsskarð pass

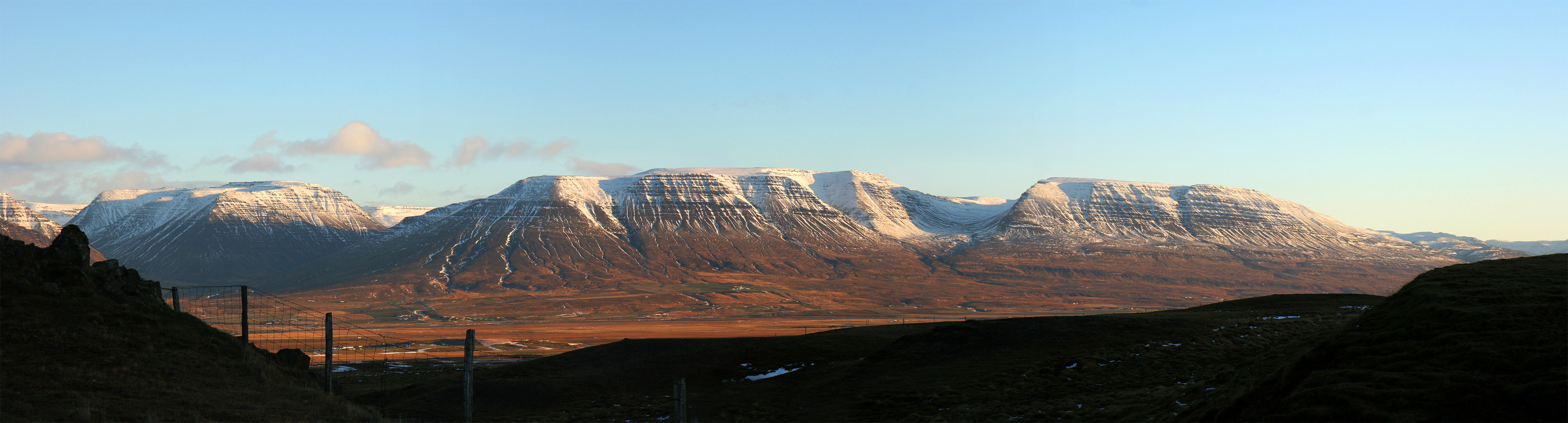
View east across Skagafjörður, from Vatnsskarð pass, just south of Varmahlíð

Varmahlíð (Icelandic pronunciation: [ˈvarmaˌl̥iːθ]) is a small village in Skagafjörður, northern Iceland.

In 2011 around 140 people lived on the eastern slope of the hill for which the town is named (varmur means "warm" and hlíð means "slope"). Miðgarður, a concert hall, can be found at Varmahlíð. One of Iceland's most famous men's choirs, Karlakórinn Heimir, is based there.

== Sport ==
- Smári Varmahlíð
