= Knappsstaðir =

Farm and church in Skagafjörður, Iceland

Coordinates: 65.9756°N 18.9754°W

- Farm
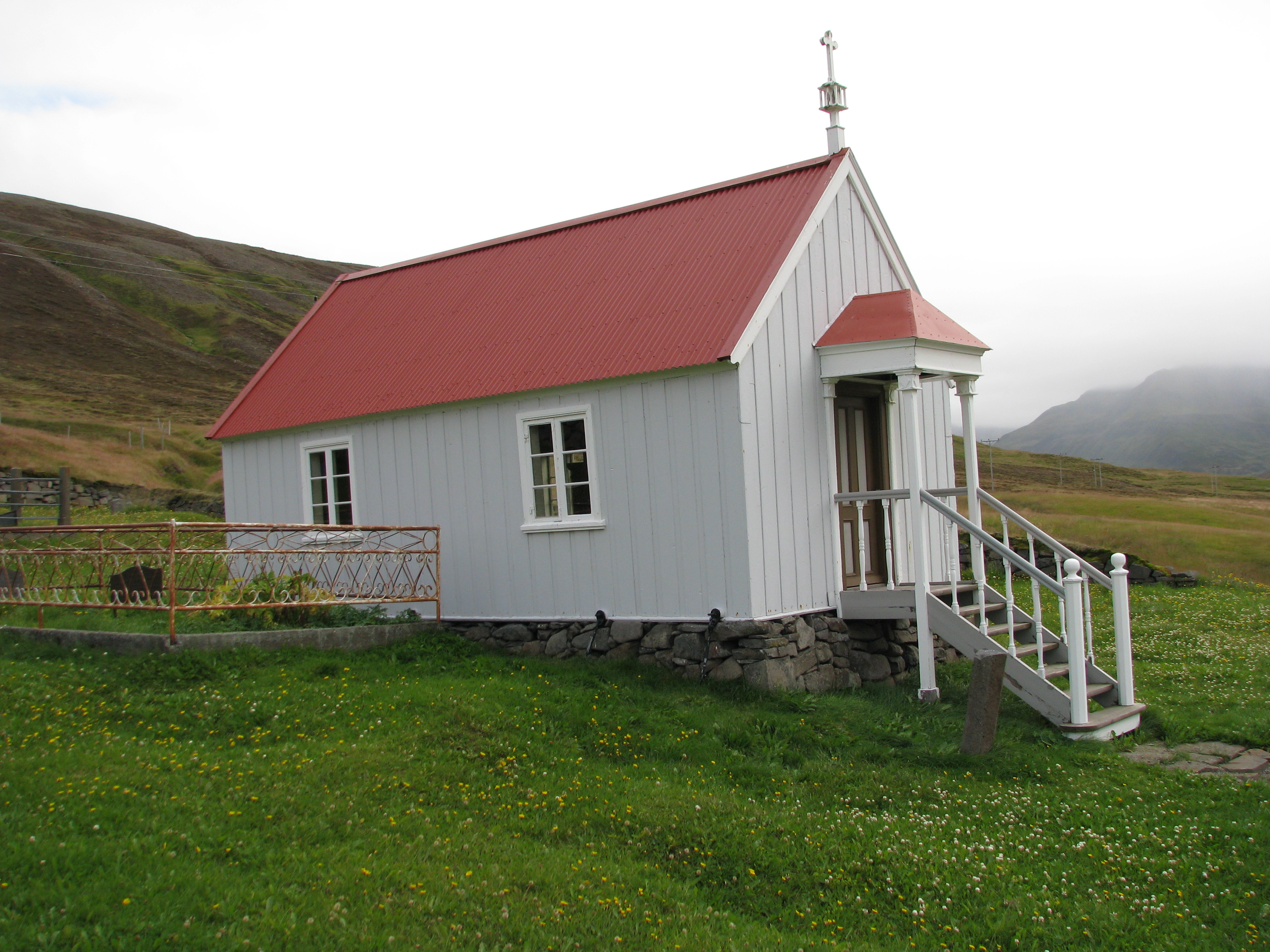
- Knappsstaðir church
- Interactive map of Knappsstaðir
- Country: Iceland
- County: Skagafjörður (municipality)
- District: Fljót
- Named for: Þórður knappur Bjarnarson

Knappsstaðir is an abandoned farm, church site, and former parsonage in Stífla, in the Fljót district of Skagafjörður, Iceland. It was the homestead of Þórður knappur Bjarnarson and Æsa Ljótólfsdóttir from Hóf in Svarfaðardalur. The farm became abandoned in 1974. A 932-meter-tall mountain called Breiðarkollur overlooks the farm.

== Knappsstaðir church ==
There has been a church at Knappsstaðir since early in Iceland's history where parish priests served. The salary for priests at Knappsstaðir was always considered to be on the lower side, moreover Stífla is a very snowy and inclement area, although the summers there were beautiful before the Skeiðsfoss power station was built and submerged part of the area under water.

On June 12, 1838, the Knappsstaðir church was severely damaged in an earthquake. It was decided that a new church would be built, and it was consecrated in 1840. It is the oldest wooden church in the country and one of the smallest. The church building was, among other things, financed by the sale of the Guðbrand's Bible. The church has belonged to Iceland's National Library since 1933.

The parsonage in Knappsstaðir was decommissioned in 1881 and the church fell under the authority of Barð. After the majority of Stífla was abandoned, the parishes merged and two churches remained in the Barð parish. Mass takes place in the church once a year and the service is always well-attended.
