= Holtshreppur =

Former municipality in Skagafjörður, Iceland

- Hreppur
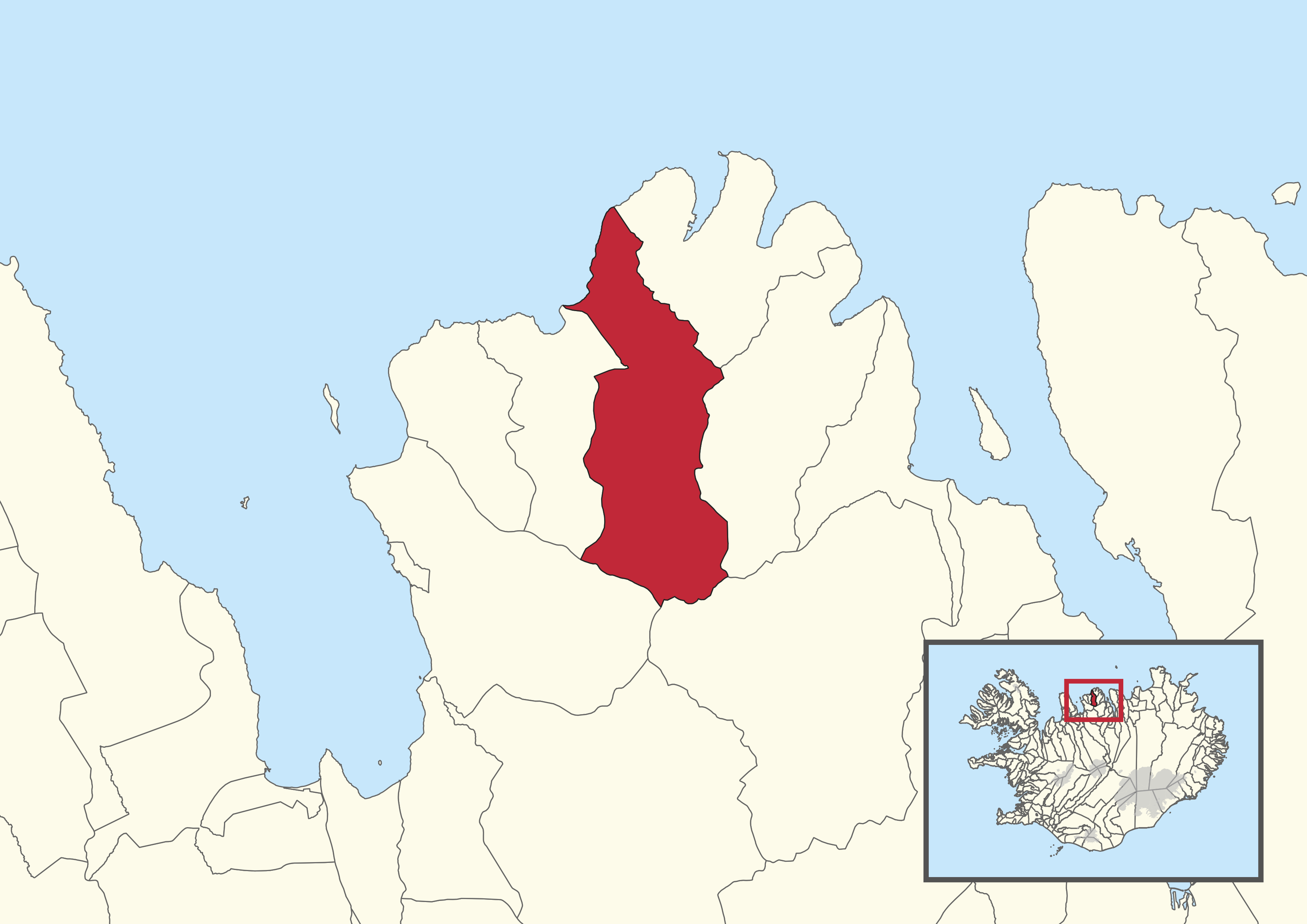
- Holtshreppur
- Country: Iceland
- County: Skagafjörður
- Division of Fljótahreppur into two hreppurs: Holtshreppur and Haganeshreppur: 1898 or 1899
- Unification with Skagafjörður (municipality): June 6, 1998
- Named for: Stóra-Holt
- Time zone: UTC+0

Holtshreppur was a hreppur, an old Icelandic municipality, in Fljót in the northernmost part of Skagafjörður County, Iceland. It was named after Stóra-Holt in Fljót, which was the location of the local parliament from early centuries until the 19th century.

The hreppur was created alongside Haganeshreppur in 1898 (or 1899) when Fljótahreppur was divided in two. The two hreppurs reunited under the old name on April 1, 1988.

On June 6, 1998, Fljótahreppur joined with 10 other local governments to form Skagafjörður County.

== Hreppur Council ==
The last hreppur council was elected in the Holtshreppur committee election on May 28, 1986, in which Guðrún Helgadóttir, Heiðar Albertsson, Kristinn Hermannsson, Reynir Pálsson, and Ríkharður Jónsson were voted into office.
