= Rannveig =

Rannveig is a feminine given name of Old Norse. Notable people with the name are as follows:

== First name ==
- Rannveig Aamodt (born 1984), Norwegian rock climber
- Rannveig Andresen (born 1967), Norwegian politician
- Rannveig Djønne (born 1974), Norwegian folk musician
- Rannveig Guðmundsdóttir (born 1940), Icelandic politician
- Rannveig Þorsteinsdóttir (1904–1987), Icelandic lawyer and politician

== Middle name ==
- Elín Rannveig Briem (1856–1937), Icelandic teacher and writer
- Sunna Rannveig Davíðsdóttir, known as Sunna Davíðsdóttir (born 1985), Icelandic mixed martial artist
- Svanborg Rannveig Jónsdóttir (born 1953), Icelandic academic
- Margrét Rannveig Ólafsdóttir (born 1976), Icelandic football player
- Ida Rannveig Roggen, known as Ida Roggen (born 1978), Norwegian jazz singer

== See also ==
- Ranveig, list of people with a similar name
