= Stóra-Holt =

Farm and former church site in Skagafjörður, Iceland

Holt
- Farm
- Stóra-Holt
- Interactive map of Holt
- Coordinates: 66°2′34.836″N 19°0′25.355″W
- Country: Iceland
- County: Skagafjörður (municipality)
- District: Fljót
- Time zone: UTC+0

Stóra-Holt is a farm and former church site in Fljót in Skagafjörður, Iceland. There was a ranch there for a long time, and Stóra-Holt was one of the largest properties in Fljót. The property consisted of all the land from the Fljótaá river to the mountains between Brúnastaða and Saurbæjar farm, including all of Holtsdalur valley. The mountain overlooking the town is called Holtshyrna.

There was a church in Holt until 1906 when it was blown away in a storm. It was ultimately not rebuilt after. Stóra-Holt was never a parsonage after the Reformation, rather it was served by the priest in Barð at the Stóra-Holt church.
