= Hraun (Fljót) =

Farm in Skagafjörður, Iceland

Coordinates: 66.0972°N 19.0767°W

Hraun Hraun í Fljótum
- Farm
- Hraun in Fljót
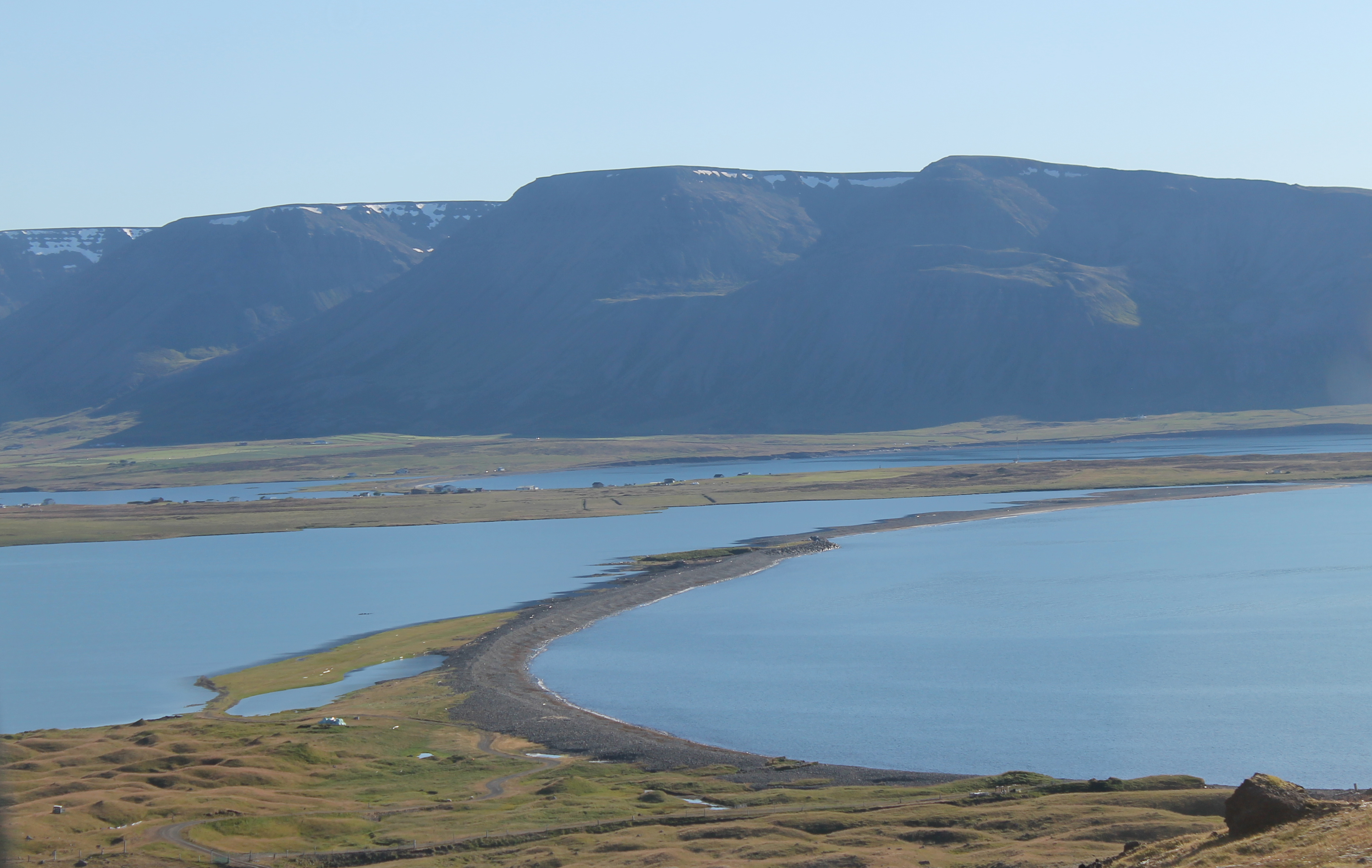
- Interactive map of Hraun
- Country: Iceland
- County: Skagafjörður (municipality)
- District: Fljót

Hraun is the outermost farm in the Fljót district of eastern Skagafjörður, Iceland. The outermost farm in western Skagafjörður county, on the tip of the Skagi peninsula is also called Hraun, which is Icelandic for "lava," but its name is in the singular, while the Hraun in Fljót is plural (note: hraun is the same in both the singular and plural in two of Icelandic's four grammatical cases). The farm is at a similar northern latitude, but the Hraun on the Skagi peninsula is a little more north.

== Geography ==
From Hraun, there are good views of Fljót and Skagafjörður. The farm is on a slope overlooking Miklavatn lake and a long isthmus called Hraunamöl between the lake and the sea from which people used to fish. There is an inlet called Hraunakrókur north of Hraunamöl where a polar bear turned up on and was killed in 1870. The major road to Siglufjörður went, and still goes, by Hraun—previously up Hraunadalur valley through Siglufjarðarskarð—but now through Alemenningar road and Strákagöng tunnel; it used to be heavily trafficked. In the late 19th century, a clothing store was established there, which later relocated to Haganesvík.

Since the land offered good access to fishing in Miklavatn and a nearby eider duck nesting site, there was a large farm in Hraun for a long time. One of the most well-known of Hraun's farmers in the last century was Einar Baldvin Guðmundsson (1841–1910), member of parliament and merchant. He was married three times and had many children. He referred to his descendants as the "Hraun Clan".
