= Haganeshreppur =

Former municipality in Skagafjörður, Iceland

- Hreppur
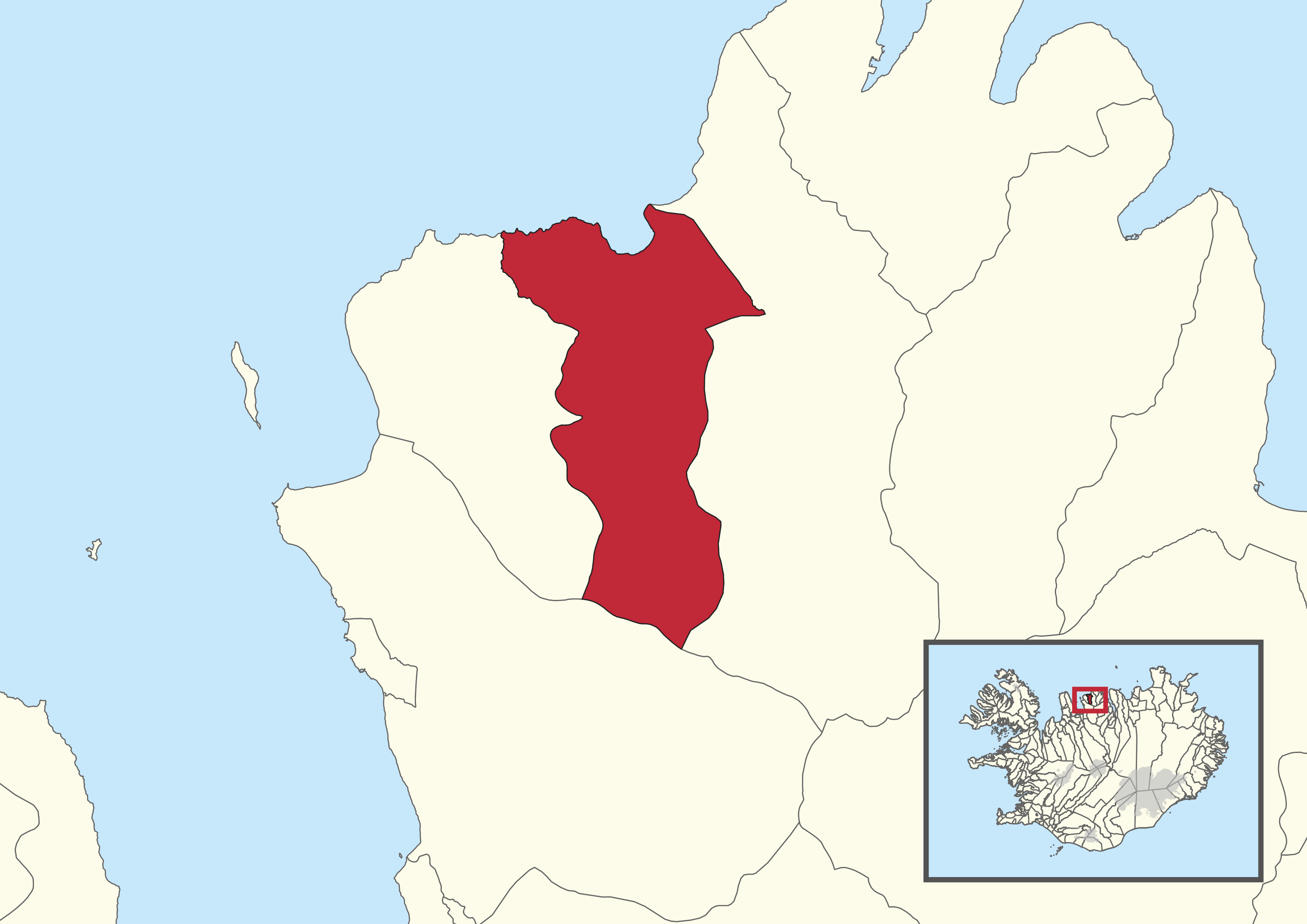
- Haganeshreppur
- Country: Iceland
- Country: Skagafjörður
- Division of Fljótahreppur into two hreppurs: Holtshreppur and Haganeshreppur: 1898 or 1899
- Reunification with Holtshreppur to form Fljótahreppur: April 1, 1988
- Time zone: UTC+0
- Became a part of Skagafjörður (municipality) in 1998

Haganeshreppur was a hreppur, an old Icelandic municipality, in Fljót, in the northernmost part of Skagafjörður County, Iceland.

The hreppur united with Holtshreppur in 1898 (or 1899) when Fljótahreppur was divided in two. The two hreppurs reunited under the old name on April 1, 1988.

On June 6, 1998, Fljótahreppur joined with 10 other local governments to form Skagafjörður County.

== Hreppur Council ==
The last Haganeshreppur council election was held in 1986.
