= Stífla =

District in Skagafjörður, Iceland

Coordinates: 66°N 19°W

- District
- Interactive map of Stífla
- Country: Iceland
- County: Skagafjörður (municipality)
- District: Fljót
- Named for: Stífla means "dam" in Icelandic. By coincidence, the area was named this long before the power station damned the river.

Stífla is an area of the Fljót district in Skagafjörður, Iceland, in the interior of Fljótadalur valley. The name originally referred to the group of hills that cuts directly across the valley and was called either Stífla or Stífluhólar, but the name later came to refer to the area between the hills. It was previously a flat, grassy area and beautiful valley, and there were a good many farms. The Stífluá river ran through the area, but past Stífluhólar its name changes to Fljótaá.

Around 1940, it was decided to create a hydroelectric power station in Siglufjörður that harnessed the Stífluhólar river, and production began in 1942. A dam was built in the ravine in Stífluhólar and the Skeiðsfoss power station officially started running in 1945. There was a lake among the hills, called Stífluvatn, that became significantly larger once the power plant started running, and as a result, a lot of land was largely submerged, and some land was abandoned. The lake is now 3.9 km^{2}.
