= Haganesvík =

Villages and former market town in Skagafjörður, Iceland

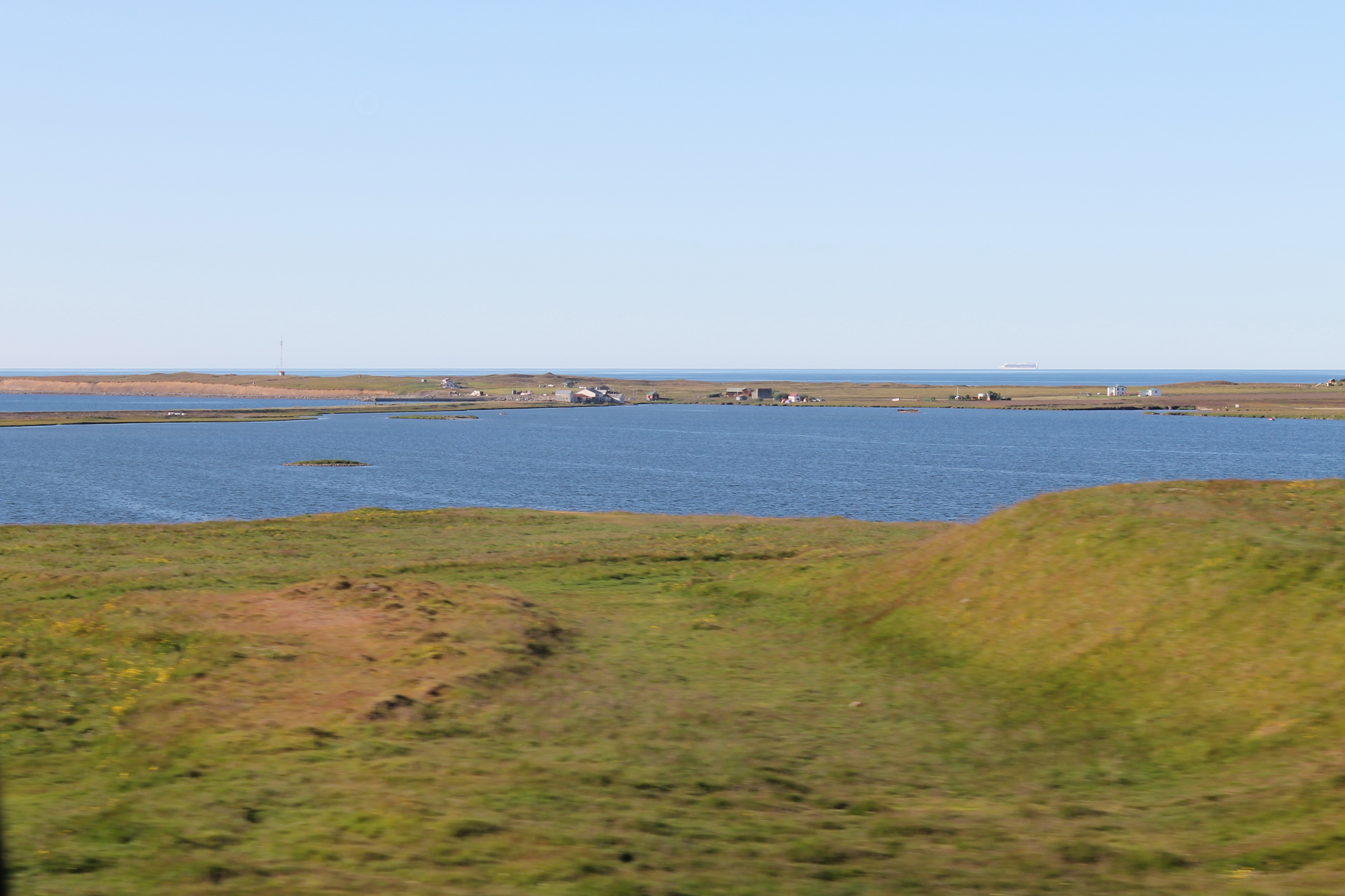
- Haganesvík
- Interactive map of Haganesvík
- Coordinates: 66°04′39″N 19°07′47″W
- Country: Iceland
- County: Skagafjörður (municipality)
- District: Fljót
- Boroughs: Villages

Haganesvík is a group of villages, and formerly a small market town, in the Fljót district of Skagafjörður, Iceland.

== History ==
In centuries past, Haganesvík was a popular fishing area, not the least for shark, and there were also workman's cottages there for a long time. In 1897, Haganesvík became a licensed trading post and, in 1901, Einar Baldvin Guðmundsson, a farmer from Hraun, relocated his shop there after working out of Hraun since 1879. He later became the manager of the Gránufélagið trading company. The owners of multiple shops merged their businesses and ran the market collectively until 1922. From 1919 onward, a cooperative, Samvinnufélag Fljótamanna (the Fljót Co-op), which operated in Haganesvík, ran the market until the 1970s. The Fljót co-op later merged with Kaupfélag Skagfirðinga, the Skagafjörður Co-op, which ran the market from then on.

Haganesvík also had a slaughterhouse and a freezing facility. The harbor used to be precarious because it was open to the ocean, but a concrete dock was built in 1951. The dock was subsequently destroyed in a terrible storm. For a long time, small fishing vessels operated out of Haganesvík, but more recently, boats have been set up and stored there and, in the spring and summer, boats are launched to fish for lumpfish, and for coastal fishing from Siglufjörður. Haganesvík had a mail service and telephone exchange, as well as a community center. Haganesvík's decline began when the road was built to its current location, which turned Haganesvík into an out-of-the-way place. The market was moved to Ketilás not long after. Now there are only a few residences remaining in Haganesvík, most of them summer homes.
