= Miklavatn (Fljót) =

Lake in Skagafjörður, Iceland

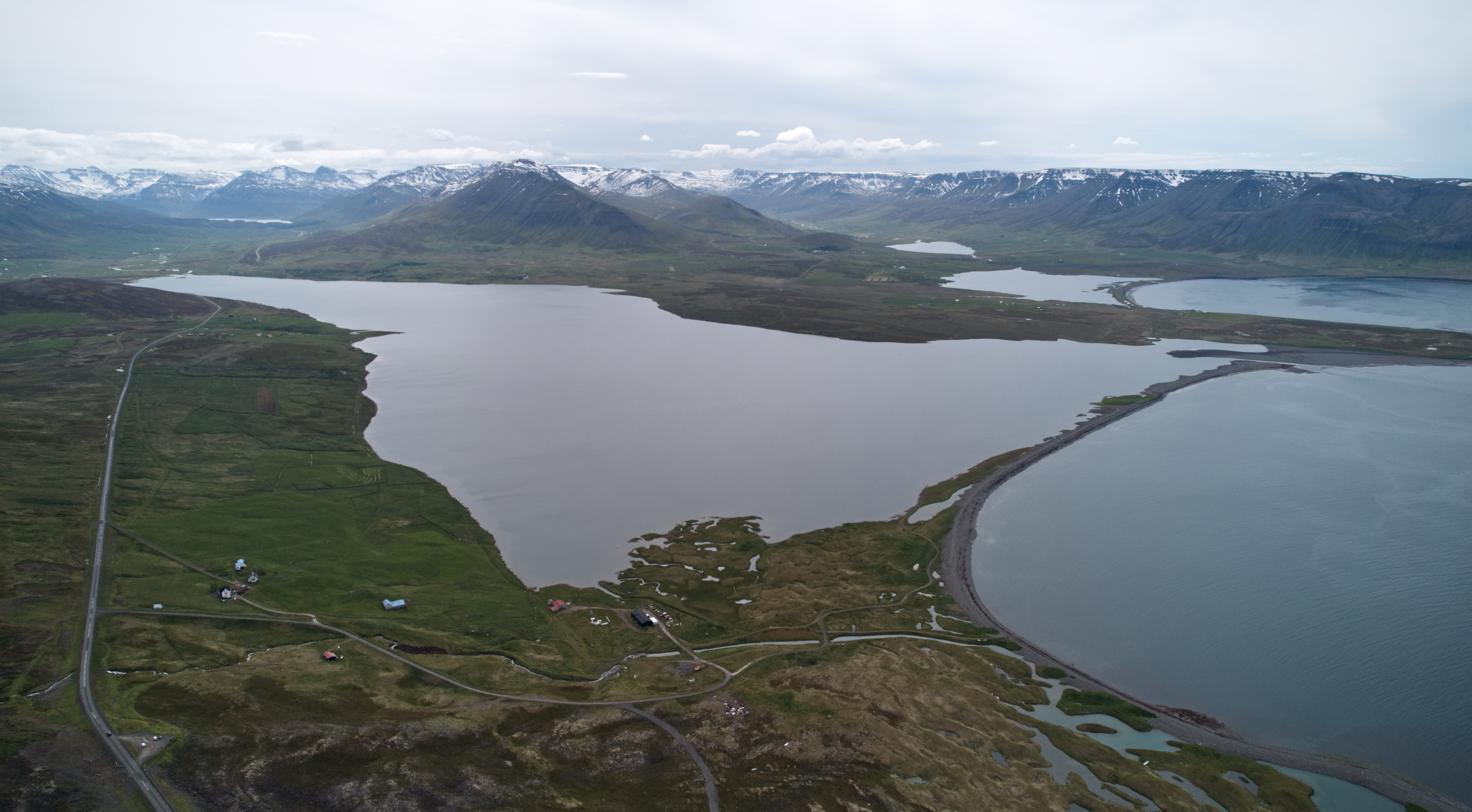
- Interactive map of Miklavatn
- Location: Fljót, Skagafjörður, Iceland
- Coordinates: 66°4′25″N 19°4′29″W
- Type: Lake
- Etymology: Icelandic for "big lake"
- Surface area: 7.4 km^{2} (2.9 sq mi)
- Max. depth: 22 m (72 ft)

Miklavatn is a lake in Fljót in Skagafjörður, Iceland. It is the second biggest lake in the region at 7.4 square kilometers. The Hraunamöl isthmus separates it from the sea, but the runoff from the lake flows through the Hraunaós estuary. The lake was originally a fjord but as the isthmus formed, it closed the fjord off, turning it into a lake.

The lake offers a lot of trout fishing. Because water from the ocean often flows into the lake, it is saltier at the bottom, so various salt-water fish are also caught there. The Fljótaá river flows into Miklavatn from Stífluvatn lake, and some smaller rivers flow into the lake as well.

In the early 20th century, there was some discussion around building a navigable canal through Hraunamöl and establishing an ocean liner harbor in Miklavatn, but these plans fell through. In the 1940s, sea planes that went searching for herring had a summer base in Miklavatn.
