= Ranveig =

Ranveig(also: "Ranvei," "Randvig," "Ranvreig," "Randag," "Randig," "Rannveig") is a nordic given name.

Notable people with the name include:

- Ranveig Frøiland (1945–2020), Norwegian politician
- Ranveig Narbuvold, Norwegian ski-orienteering competitor
