= Svanborg Rannveig Jónsdóttir =

Icelandic academic

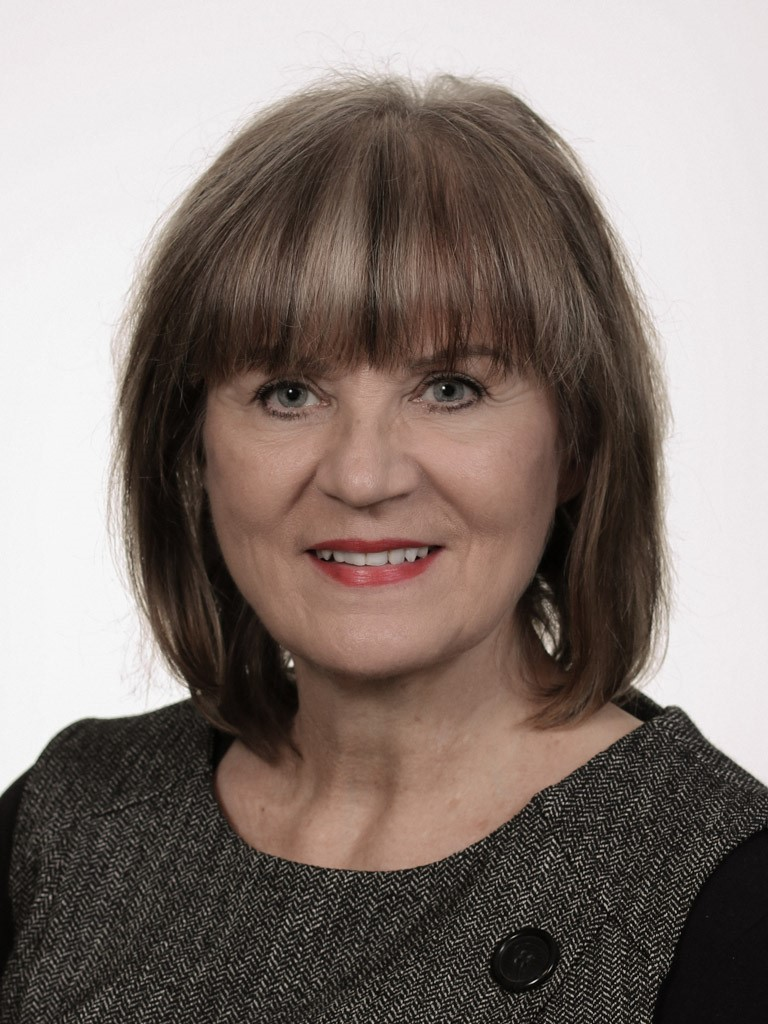
- Born: 7 February 1953 (age 73)
- Occupations: professor in arts and creative work in the School of Education at the University of Iceland

Svanborg Rannveig Jónsdóttir (born 7 February 1953) professor in arts and creative work in the School of Education at the University of Iceland.

== Professional career ==
Svanborg finished the national standard lower secondary school examination from Flensborg Upper Secondary School in Hafnarfjörður, her matriculation examination from Menntaskólinn við Tjörnina in 1973, and her Diploma in Education from Iceland University of Education in 1978. She completed a diploma in design and woodwork teaching from Iceland University of Education in 2001 and an MA in pedagogy from the University of Iceland's School of Social Sciences in 2005. Svanborg completed a PhD in Pedagogy and Educational Theory from the University of Iceland's School of Education in 2011. Her research focused on Innovation Education in Icelandic compulsory schools. The title of her dissertation is “The location of innovation education in Icelandic compulsory schools”.

== Teaching ==
Svanborg worked as a primary school teacher from fall 1978 to 2006. Svanborg introduced Innovation Education in Gnúpverjaskóli Elementary School (later Brautarholt and Gnúpverjaskóli and, since 2004, Þjórsárskóli). She has actively participated in development of this area of study in Iceland. Svanborg was a part-time teacher at the Iceland University of Education and at the School of Education at the University of Iceland from 2006 to 2011. As of 2012, she was an associate professor at the same school and from July 2019 a professor there. She has taught various courses in pedagogy and educational science.) She has focused on innovation education, creativity and artistic approaches in studies and teaching. For example, she has taught in continuing education courses for working teachers from 2003 and has given presentations, instructed and taught innovation education in many parts of Iceland as well as abroad to teachers, principals, teacher students, political associations, the general public, and organisations.

== Research ==
Svanborg's research has focused on innovation and entrepreneurial education, creativity in education, organisational change, teachers’ collective efficacy and self-study in teacher education (self-study of teaching and teacher education practice S-STTEP) and collaborative supervision of master's students.

She has directed two research groups, RASKA 1 from 2013 to 2015 and RASKA 2 from 2016 to 2018. The groups consisted of practicing teachers who conducted action research on their own work and focused on creativity in studies and teaching. RASKA 1 (REsearch on CR(SK)eative schooling) ran from 2013 to 2015. It included three teachers in the School of Education and five teachers of Icelandic and mathematics in preschools, elementary schools, and upper secondary schools. The teachers examined their teaching in order to identify how they could strengthen the creative element in their work.

The RASKA 2 group consisted of eight art and vocational teachers on three school levels – elementary and upper secondary schools and university level. The research went on from 2016 to 2018.

=== Collaboration on research ===
- Collaborative supervision of master students. Research on development of group guidance of master's students, along with Karen Rut Gísladóttir and Hafdís Guðjónsdóttir The research is part of continuous development in teachers’ work on their education, where they apply self-study to understand the development of their teaching and to improve their supervision. Several peer-reviewed book chapters and articles have been published on the findings of the research, including the article Using Self-study to develop a third space for collaborative supervision of master´s projects in teacher education in the journal Studying Teacher Education: a Journal on Self-study of Teacher Education Practices, and the article On doing a master's project in a community of students and instructors (in Icelandic, long abstract in English) in the journal Tímarit um uppeldi og menntun.
- SAM-GETA (CTE Collective teacher efficiency in a changing world). Research in Icelandic schools from 2010 to 2016. The SAM-GETA research entailed examining teachers’ roles and capabilities in addressing new and developing curriculum areas, such as science and technology in the community, education on sustainability, innovation education, and the use of information technology for studies and work.
- Research on developing a course for teachers on teaching in schools with inclusion, along with Karen Rut Gísladóttir and Hafdís Guðjónsdóttir. The findings have appeared in several book chapters and peer-reviewed articles.
- RASKA 1 and RASKA 2 collaborative research on teachers of traditional subjects on four schooling levels and creativity in schooling from 2013 to 2015 and on arts and handicrafts teachers from 2016 to 2018.
- Research on the development of NFM in Fljótsdalshérað District with Rósa Gunnarsdóttir. Findings published, for example, in the book The road to independence: Emancipatory pedagogy.
- Leikum, lærum, lifum (Let's play, learn, live), under the auspices of RannUng, an action research of a group of researchers from the School of Education with practicing teachers and school staff, focusing on the implementation of the six fundamental issues of Icelandic education. Findings published in the book Leikum, lærum, lifum by University of Iceland Press.
- Research on innovation and entrepreneurial education at the secondary education level, in collaboration with Innovation Center Iceland, the Ministry of Education, Science and Culture, and the Ministry of Industries and Innovation – report 2013. Two articles, 2013 and 2014, were written in collaboration with Meyvant Þórólfsson, Gunnar E. Finnbogason, and Jóhanna Karlsdóttir on the foundation of innovation and entrepreneurial education and the findings of the research
- Participation in the research Vilji og veruleik (Intentions and reality). From 2005 to 2007, a research group at Iceland University of Education, researched studies and teaching in the natural sciences and technology in Icelandic schools.

== Social activities and leadership ==
Svanborg chaired the Gnúpverjar's Youth Association 1987 to 1989 and participated in the work of Jóra Training Association (International Training in Communication) for five years. She was a member of its board of directors for two years. She was the principal of Gnúpverjaskóli 1991–1992, a member of the board of directors of the Teachers´ Association of South Iceland from 1995 to 1997, and was a member of the board of directors of the Association of Icelandic Handicrafts Teachers for two years.

In 2005, she organised the founding of the Association of Teachers of and People Interested in Innovation Education (now the Association of Teachers of Innovation and Entrepreneurial Education). She was chair of the association until 2010. Svanborg organised the founding of the Association of Doctoral Students at the School of Education and was chairman of the board from its founding to 2010.

She was the editor of Netla (a peer-reviewed web journal on pedagogy and education), along with Torfi Hjartarson and Robert Berman from 2012 to 2014. She organised the funding of the Laboratory for Creative Schooling (RASK) at the School of Education in 2012 and has directed it since then. Svanborg has developed and supervised the Electives Specialiasation of Innovation Education in the Faculty of Education and Diversity in the School of Education and supervises the courses falling under innovation education in that division.

Svanborg directed the European project Practical Entrepreneurial Assessment Tool for Europe (PEAT-EU) from 2016 to 2018.

== Collaboration and participation in international projects ==
Svanborg has collaborated with various parties in education, including through European Projects. Svanborg participated in the European project MakEY. The project involved children and the use of digital media – at home and in innovation workshops or makerspaces. The University of Iceland's School of Education participated in MakEY (Makerspaces in the early years: Enhancing digital literacy and creativity). The project was a collaborative project of many universities and institutions in Europe and outside Europe. Sheffield University in Britain provided leadership. Several Icelandic institutions took part in the project, along with UI's School of Education (University of Akureyri, Innovation Center Iceland and RG Menntaráðgjöf/INNOENT).

Svanborg directed the European Project PEAT-EU (Practical Entrepreneurial Assessment Tool for Europe). It entails developing a course assessment of innovation and entrepreneurship education. The collaborating parties were from Spain, Wales, Sweden and Iceland. The project began in October 2016 and finished in October 2018. The outcomes of the project are published on the page Entre Assess. She was also a representative of the University of Iceland's School of Education in the project Find your inner inventor (2016-2019), a collaboration with Polish and Czech universities.

She was the School of Education's representative on the European collaborative project ADEPTT. It entails developing an instruction model/courses for teachers in innovation and entrepreneurship education. The countries with representatives on the project are: Spain, Portugal, Belgium, Germany, Wales, Norway and Iceland. The project finished in November 2013.

== Course materials ==
Svanborg, along with Rósa Gunnarsdóttir and Örn Daníel Jónsson, has been involved in and written course materials in innovation and entrepreneurship education: 2007 Tíra – skapandi hugsun, hagnýt nálgun, published by Iðnú. She was also a consultant for translations of a course that the National Centre for Educational Materials published: Invention trip – com'on! Innovation Education – exercises 2010 and a publication of The Directorate of Education 2018: Next level, Innovation and Entrepreneurship for grades 7-10 and Be your own boss, Innovation and Entrepreneurship for grades 5-7. The book, The road to independence: Emancipatory pedagogy, that Svanborg wrote, along with Rósa Gunnarsdóttir, is intended as a textbook for strengthening the educational theory of Innovation Education for teachers and other people interested in this area of study.

== Main written works ==
=== Articles ===
- Jónsdóttir, S. R., & Macdonald, A. (2019). The feasibility of innovation and entrepreneurial education in middle schools. Journal of Small Business and Enterprise Development, 26(2), 255–272.
- Svanborg R Jónsdóttir, Hafdís Guðjónsdóttir og Karen Rut Gísladóttir. (2018). Að vinna meistaraprófsverkefni í námssamfélagi nemenda og leiðbeinenda]. Tímarit um uppeldi og menntun. 27(2), 2018, 201−223.
- Svanborg R Jónsdóttir. (2017). Narratives of creativity: How eight teachers on four school levels integrate creativity into teaching and learning. Thinking Skills and Creativity, 24, bls 127–139.
- Jónsdóttir, S. R, Guðjónsdóttir, H. & Gísladóttir, K. R. (2015). Using Self-study to develop a third space for collaborative supervision of master´s projects in teacher education. Studying Teacher Education: A Journal of Self-Study of Teacher Education Practices, 11(1), 32–48.
- Hafdís Guðjónsdóttir og Svanborg R. Jónsdóttir. (2012). Háskólakennarar rýna í starf sitt: Þróun framhaldsnámskeiðs í kennaramenntun. Ráðstefnurit Netlu – Menntakvika 2012.
- Jónsdóttir, S. R., Thorsteinsson, G., & Page, T. (2008). The ideology of innovation education and its emergence as a new subject in compulsory schools. Journal on School Educational Technology, 3(4), 75–84.
- Jónsdóttir, S., Page, T., Thorsteinsson, G., & Nicolescu, A. (2008). An investigation into the development of innovation education as a new subject in secondary school education Cognition, Brain, Behavior. An Interdisciplinary Journal, 12(4).

=== Books ===
Svanborg R Jónsdóttir og Rósa Gunnarsdóttir. (2017). road to independence: Emancipatory pedagogy. Ritstjóri bókaflokks Bharath Sriraman. Rotterdam: Sense.

=== Book chapters ===
- Svanborg R. Jónsdóttir. (2016). Sköpun í skólastarfi. 4. Kafli. Kristín Karlsdóttir og Anna Magnea Hreinsdóttir (ritstjórar). (2016). Leikum, lærum, lifum: Námssvið leikskóla og grunnþættir menntunar (bls. 77–94). Reykjavík: RannUng og Háskólaútgáfan.
- Svanborg R. Jónsdóttir og Allyson Macdonald. (2013). Pedagogy and settings in innovation education. In L. V. Shavinina (Ed.), The Routledge international handbook of innovation education (pp. 273–287). London: Routledge.

== Personal life ==
Svanborg was born in Fljót in Skagafjörður. She is the next-youngest child of marine engineer Jón Einarsson (1917-2010) and Anna Halldórsdóttir (1913-1978), seamstress and housewife. Svanborg is married to Valdimar Jóhannsson (1951) farmer, and they have five children.
