= Barð =

Farm and church site in Skagafjörður, Iceland

- Farm
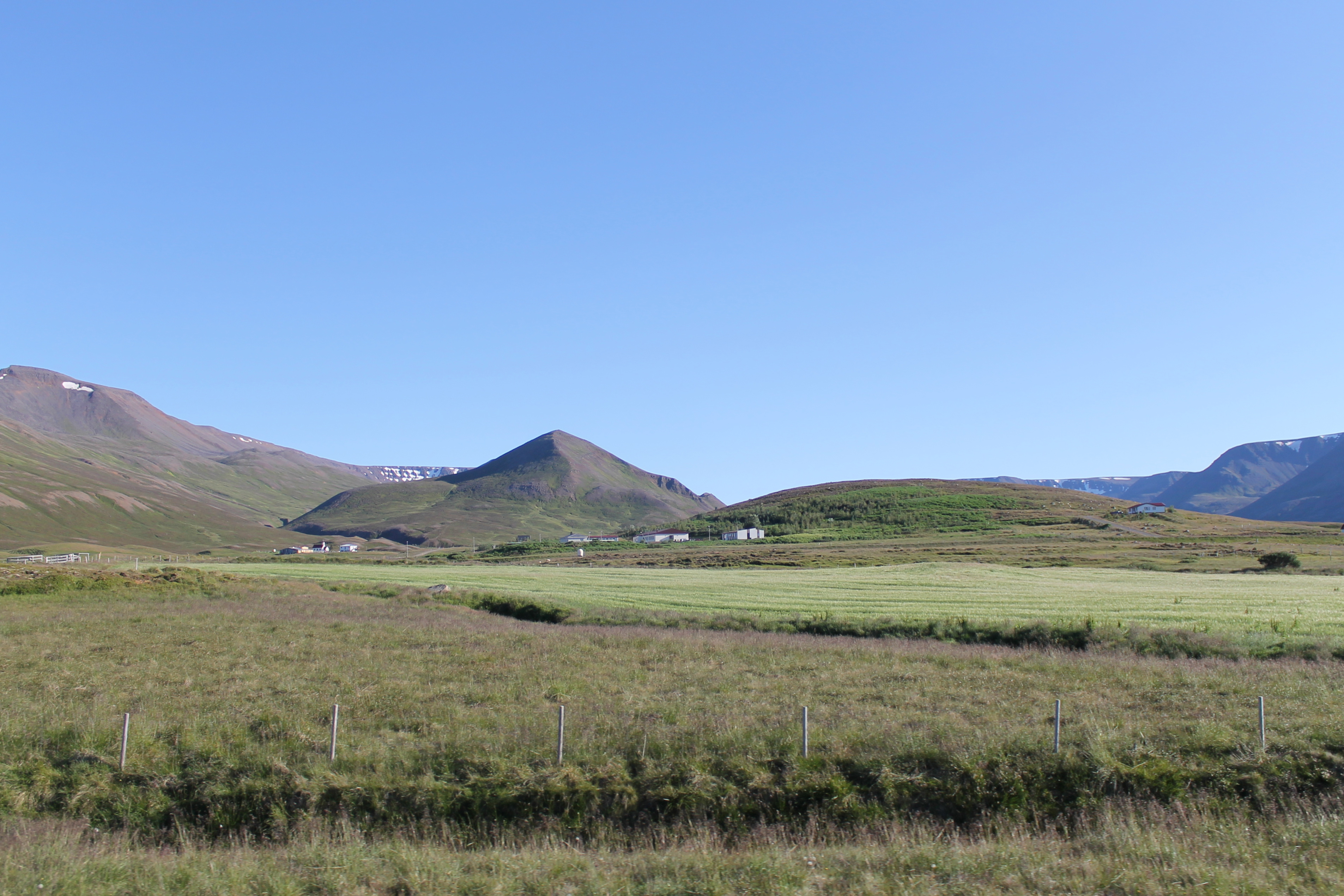
- Barð in Fljót
- Interactive map of Barð
- Country: Iceland
- County: Skagafjörður (municipality)
- District: Fljót
- Named after: Barðverjar clan

Barð is a farm and church site in Fljót in Skagafjörður, Iceland. Overlooking the farm is a striking mountain named Barð (sometimes called Barðið) with a steep ridge that faces the ocean. Barð was a large farm with many smallholdings where a noble family, the Barðverjar clan, lived in centuries past. The church there served as a rectory, but it was decommissioned in 1970 and was then served by a priest from Hofsós. The current church at Barð was built in 1889 and it is a protected site.

There is geothermal heat at Barð and old texts mention a Barðslaug or Barð warm spring where, for example, a priest was killed in 1252. Later on, a swimming pool was built there and later still, a boarding school called Sólgarðar by the pool. There is now a branch of the Grunnskólanum austan Vatna primary school there.

One of Barð's notable inhabitants was Jón Norðmann (1820–1877) who wrote the manuscript Allrahanda, which is preserved in the National and University Library of Iceland.
