= Skeiðsfoss power station =

Hydroelectric power facility in Skagafjörður, Iceland

Skeiðsfossvirkjun
- Country: Iceland
- Location: Fljót, Skagafjörður
- Coordinates: 65°59′55″N 19°0′50″W
- Status: Commissioned
- Construction began: 1942
- Commission date: March 29, 1945
- Owners: Orkusalan, ehf

External links
- Website: https://www.orkusalan.is/virkjun/skeidafossvirkjun

The Skeiðsfoss power station (Icelandic: Skeiðsfossvirkjun) is actually two hydroelectric power facilities in the Fljót district in Skagafjörður, Iceland.

The first Skeiðsfoss power station was constructed 600 meters downstream of Lake Stifluvatn, along the Fljótaá river. It was activated on March 29, 1945 with a maximum energy generation potential of 1,800 kW. The plant expanded in 1954, raising its energy output to 3,200 kW.

The second Skeiðsfoss power station, situated next to the farm Stóra-Þverá, about 2 kilometers downstream from Skeiðsfossvirkjun I, was activated in 1976 with an energy output of 1,700 kW. In total, the two stations provide 4,900 kW.

The stations were built by the Siglufjörður power company (Rafveita Siglufjarðar). The energy company Rafmagnsveitur ríkisins (RARIK) bought the power stations in 1991 and they are now owned by Orkusalan ehf (Orkusalan, ltd.).
