= Fljót =

District in Skagafjörður, Iceland

- District
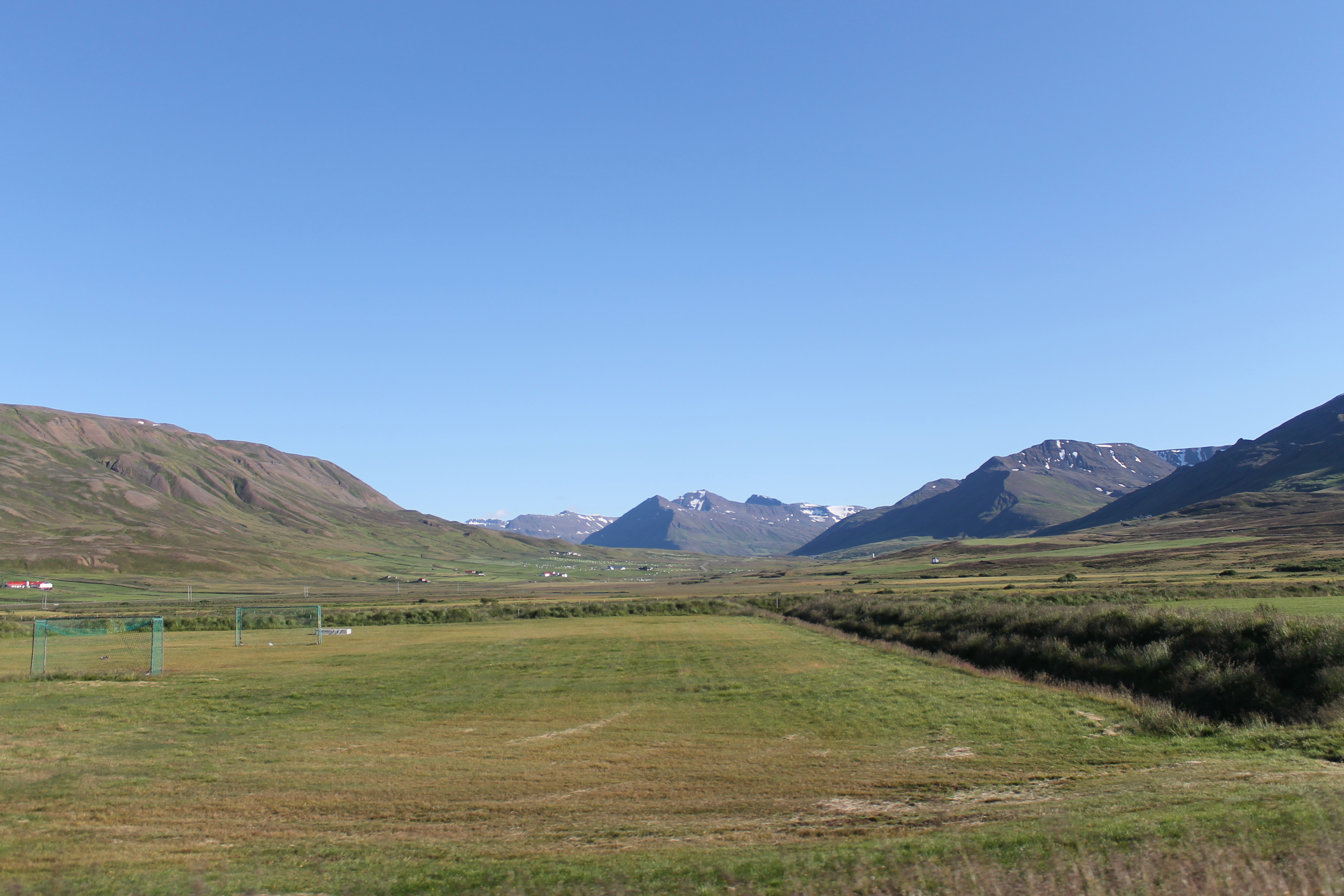
- Fljót
- Country: Iceland
- County: Skagafjörður (municipality)
- Founder: Hrafna-Flóki Vilgerðarson
- Boroughs: Farms

Fljót is the northernmost district on the east side of Skagafjörður, Iceland. It is divided into Eastern and Western Fljót and extends from Stafá river in the west to the county's border with Eyjafjörður county in the east. In the north of Fljót, the boundary between the counties lies on Almenningsnöf.

== Geography ==
Flókadalur valley and Bakkar are sometimes considered part of Fljót because they were a part of the former municipality Fljótahreppur. However, "Fljót" most often only refers to the wide valley leading off of Haganesvík and the area heading north along Miklavatn lake, up to Hraun, which is the northernmost farm in Fljót and, therefore, in all of Skagafjörður county. The area east of Hópsvatn lake to Haganes peninsula, and then along Miklavatn's southern shore is often called a single name: Western Fljót. Eastern Fljót is from there to the northeast, and includes the inner parts of Fljótadalur valley, within Stífluhóla, called Stífla.

Fljót is grassy and snowy and it has a rather large reservoir, Miklavatn. There are a number of other large lakes including Hópsvatn, Flókadalsvatn, and Stífluvatn, which is a reservoir that formed after the Skeiðsfoss power station was built. The Stífluá river used to run through Stífla; it is called Fljótaá river past Stífluhóla and Skeiðsfoss power station, where it then flows into Miklavatn. The isthmus dividing the lake from the ocean is called Hraunamöl. From there and from Haganesvík, there used to be a lot of fishing, including shark hunting.

== History ==
Haganesvík used to be a trading center, but now the Skagafjörður branch of the Cooperative Society is in Ketilás, near the interior end of Miklavatn. The Kelitás community center is also located there.

There are two church sites in Fljót, Barð in Western Fljót and Knappsstaðir in Stífla. Geothermal energy is widely available in Fljót and there is a swimming pool in Sólgarðar. There used to be an independent school but now it is a branch of the Grunnskólanum austan Vatna primary school.

== Notable people ==
- Svanborg Rannveig Jónsdóttir, professor in arts and creative work in the School of Education at the University of Iceland, was born in Fljót.
